= Glatt =

Glatt may refer to:

- Glatt group, a German manufacturer
- Glatt kosher, a term used in Jewish dietary law
- Glatt (Neckar), a river in Baden-Württemberg, Germany
- Glatt (Rhine), a river in the Glatt Valley of the canton of Zürich, Switzerland
- Max Meier Glatt (1912-2002), German-British addiction treatment expert

== See also ==
- Glattpark
- Glattalbahn
- Glattzentrum
