= Verkehrsbetriebe Glattal =

Swiss transport company

VBG Verkehrsbetriebe Glattal AG

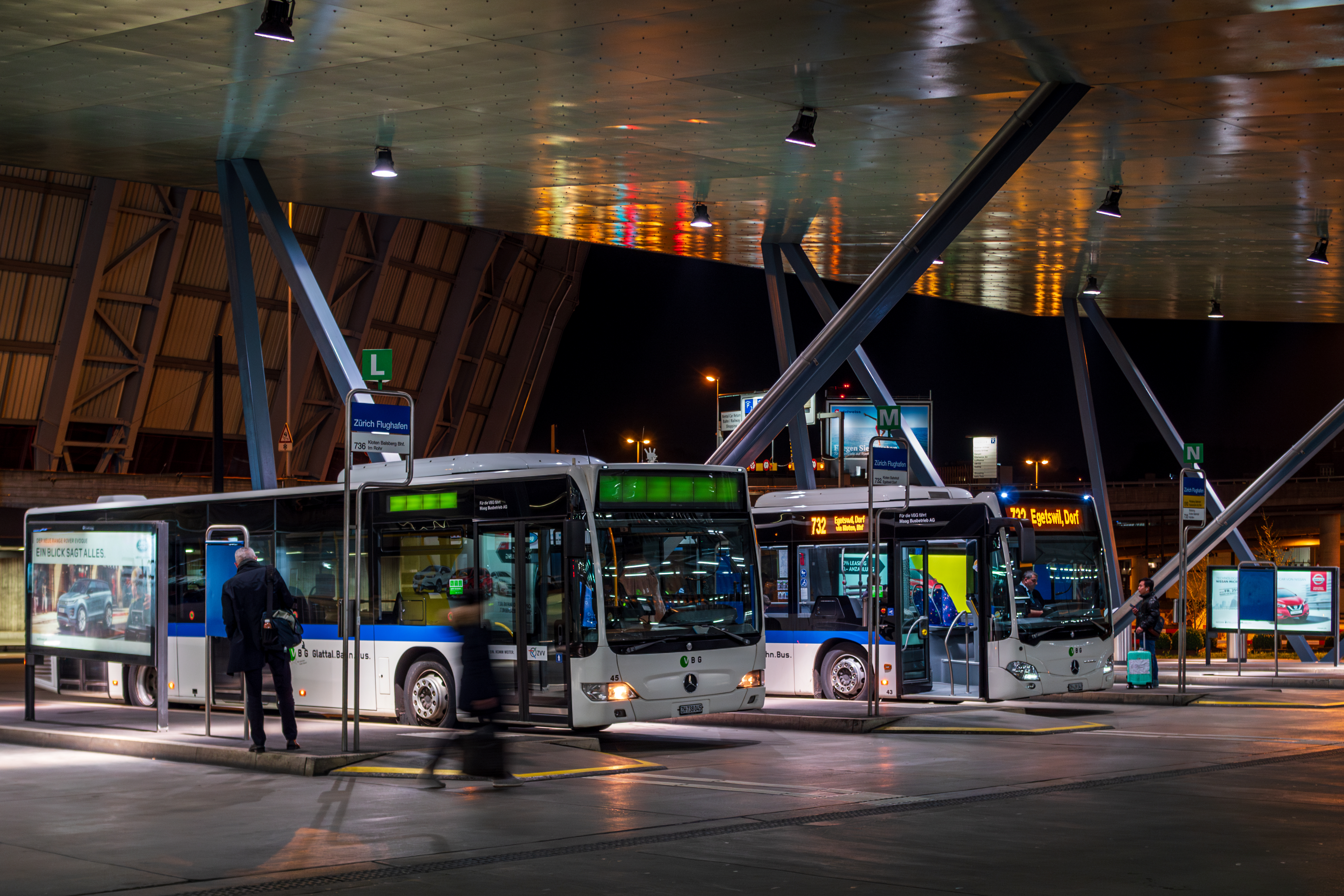

Overview
- Transit type: Light rail; Bus
- Annual ridership: 39,000,000 (2019)
- Website: www.vbg.ch

Operation
- Began operation: 1993 (32 years ago)

VBG Verkehrsbetriebe Glattal AG operates local public transport (bus, tram) in the Glattal and Furttal regions and in the Effretikon/Volketswil area, northwest and north-east of the city of Zurich, canton of Zurich, Switzerland, on behalf of the Zürcher Verkehrsverbund (ZVV). VBG trams and buses connect villages with regional railway stations served by Zurich S-Bahn trains and Zurich Airport.

As a purely market-responsible company, VBG has been responsible exclusively for the planning and implementation of transport services since 1993. All transport services are provided by contractors who organise driving personnel and vehicles.

As of 2019, the VBG transport network consisted of 54 lines (52 bus, 2 tram) with a route length of 285 km (177 mi), of which 272.3 km (169.2 mi) are bus routes and 12.7 km (7.9 mi) are tram lines. In the same year, 39 million passengers were transported.

VBG is the owner of the infrastructure of the Glattal light rail (Glattalbahn), which partly operates over the Zurich tram network of VBZ, and uses also the Glattalbus name.

== Services ==
VBG network in 2026

As of the December 2024 timetable change, VBG operates the following tram and bus routes.

=== Tram ===
- 10: Zürich HB – Zürich Oerlikon – Glattpark – Zurich Airport
- 12: Stettbach – Glatt – Wallisellen – Glattpark – Zurich Airport

=== Bus ===
- 449: Buchs-Dällikon – Dällikon, Dorf
- 450: Otelfingen – Boppelsen, Hand
- 451: Regensdorf, Zentrum – Regensdorf-Watt – Regensdorf, Leematten
- 452: Regensdorf, Moosacher – Regensdorf-Watt – Regensdorf, Zentrum
- 453: Regensdorf Althard, Bahnhof – Regensdorf, Sonnhalde West
- 454: Regensdorf-Watt – Regensdorf, Allmend
- 455: Buchs-Dällikon – Buchs
- 456: Regensdorf-Watt – Dielsdorf
- 485: Buchs, Linde – Regensdorf-Watt – Zürich Altstetten
- 491: Regensdorf-Watt – Dällikon – Dänikon – Hüttikon
- 492: Zürich Affoltern – Regensdorf-Watt
- 593: Regensberg, Dorf – Dielsdorf
- 640: Illnau – Neschwil, Post
- 650: Effretikon – Lindau, Wältiwis
- 652: Effretikon – Illnau
- 655: Effretikon – Kyburg, Dorf
- 657: Effretikon – Lindau, Wältiwis
- 658: Effretikon – Nürensdorf, Sternen
- 659: Effretikon – Nürensdorf, Winterthurerstrasse
- 660: Bassersdorf – Winterthur
- 662: Effretikon – Brütten, Harossen
- 704: Schwerzenbach, Hofwiesen – Schwerzenbach – Zurich, Klusplatz
- 705: Schwerzenbach – Benglen, Bodenacher
- 720: Schwerzenbach – Effretikon
- 721: Schwerzenbach – Volketswil, Eichstrasse
- 725: Schwerzenbach – Uster
- 726: Schwerzenbach – Gutenswil, Dorf
- 727: Schwerzenbach – Greifensee, Pfisterhölzli
- 731: Zurich Airport – Kloten – Kloten, Buchhalden
- 732: Zurich Airport – Kloten – Egetswil, Dorf
- 733: Zurich Airport – Kloten – Kloten, Graswinkel
- 734: Zurich Airport – Egetswil, Dorf
- 735: Zurich Airport – Kloten – Kloten, Härdlen
- 736: Zurich Airport – Kloten – Kloten, Buchhalden
- 739: Zurich Airport – Kloten, Rega
- 742: Rümlang – Seebach
- 743: Stettbach – Maur, See
- 744: Stettbach – Scheuren
- 745: Stettbach – Fällanden, Wigarten
- 748: Dübendorf – Dietlikon – Dietlikon, Hofwiesen
- 749: Dietlikon, Hinentalstrasse – Dietlikon – Dietlikon, Rebackerweg
- 751: Stettbach – Zurich, Kirche Fluntern
- 752: Stettbach – Dübendorf, Kunsteisbahn
- 754: Stettbach – Dübendorf
- 756: Dübendorf – Dübendorf, Gfenn
- 759: Wangen, Dorfplatz – Dübendorf – Wallisellen – Zurich Airport
- 760: Stettbach – EMPA – Dübendorf
- 761: Glattbrugg – Opfikon – Wallisellen
- 762: Glattbrugg – Opfikon, Grätzli
- 765: Dietlikon – Bassersdorf – Zurich Airport
- 766: Kloten – Bassersdorf
- 768: Zurich Airport – Seebach – Zürich Oerlikon
- 769: Bassersdorf – Nürensdorf, Sternen
- 771: Wallisellen – Wallisellen, Schäfligraben
- 772: Wallisellen – Wallisellen, Sportzentrum
- 773: Wallisellen – Wallisellen, Frohheimstrasse
- 774: Wallisellen – Wallisellen, Haldenstrasse
- 781: Zürich Oerlikon – Opfikon, Giebeleichstrasse
- 787: Zürich Oerlikon – Glatt – Dietlikon – Brüttisellen, Obere Wangenstrasse
- 795: Rümlang – Rümlang, Chilestieg
- 796: Wangen, Dorfplatz – Dietlikon
- 797: Rümlang – Oberhasli, Dorf
- 826: Pfäffikon ZH – Theilingen, Post
- 832: Fehraltorf – Kollbrunn

== See also ==
- Public transport in Zurich
- Transport in Switzerland
- List of bus operating companies in Switzerland
