= Glattpark =

Construction project on Opfikon, Switzerland

Coordinates: 47.4222°N 8.5616°E

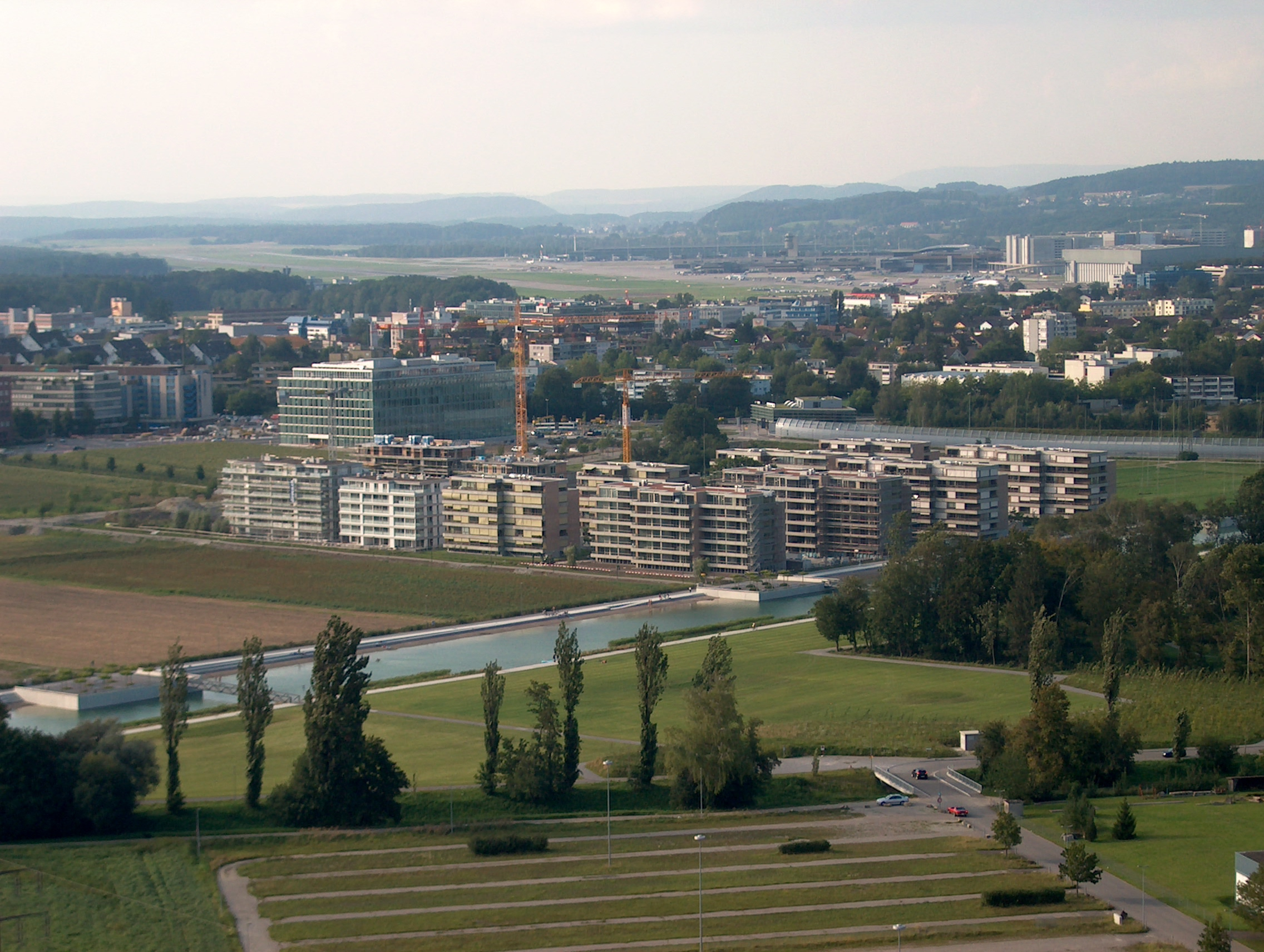
- Glattpark August 2007

- Location within Switzerland Glattpark (Canton of Zürich)
- Interactive map of the Glattpark area

General information
- Status: Completed
- Type: Residential and commercial area
- Location: Opfikon, Switzerland
- Completed: 2020

Website
- glattpark.ch

Glattpark is a large construction project in Switzerland that took shape in Opfikon, close to the border to the city of Zurich. As part of the construction project, a new neighbourhood was built by 2020; it is designed to provide room for 7,000 residents and about the same number of jobs.

Some of the favourable locational factors used to market the area are the direct proximity to the city of Zurich, where similar construction projects are being realized in the Oerlikon and Seebach quarters. The large service companies based in the north of the city and other companies in nearby Glattbrugg, Rümlang and at the airport promise a large number of potential jobs. One of the negative points is that the area is about two miles from the threshold of runway 34/16 of Zurich Airport and thus practically in the axis line of the runway. However, construction in the area placed a strong emphasis on noise isolation of the buildings, with inhabitants reporting that the noise levels are not significant.

== Headquarters ==
The headquarters of Kraft Foods Europe GmbH are located in Glattpark.

== Park ==
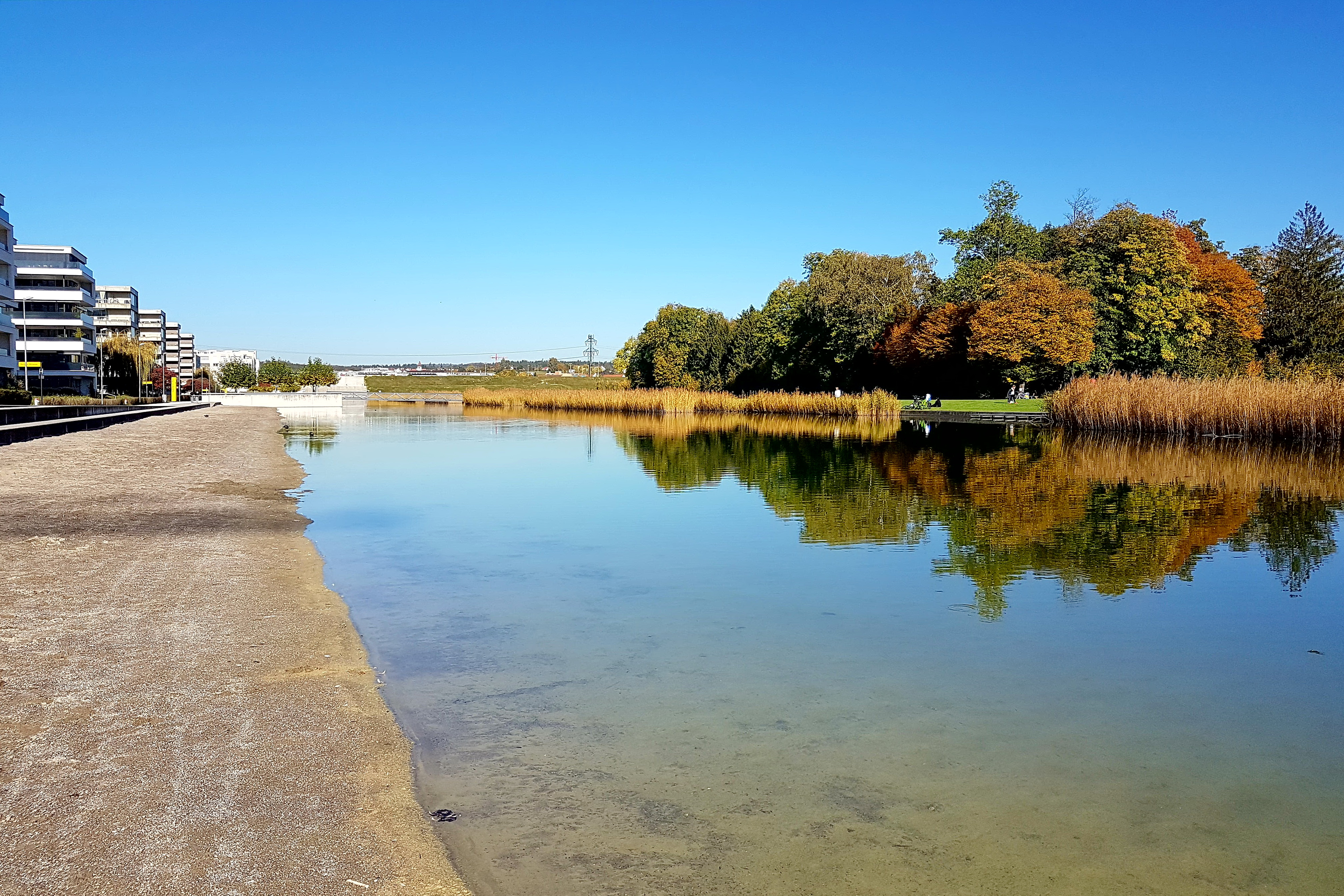
Opfikerpark and lake in 2017

On the eastern side of the area an artificial lake has been created as well as a park area, called Opfikerpark. The artificial lake is 41 metres (135 ft) wide and 550 metres (1,800 ft) long and is safe to swim in, with sandy beaches having been included in the design. Bridges cross the lake at regular intervals to link the inhabited zone with the park.

== Transport ==
The neighbourhood is intended to have as little traffic as possible, most of the roads are therefore planned as pedestrian zones.

=== Public ===
Most tram and bus stops at Glattpark are located within fare zone 121 of the Zürcher Verkehrsverbund (ZVV), except those along the Glattparkstrasse (south of the neighbourhood), which are also in fare zone 110.

In addition to the Glattalbahn (tram lines 10, 12, 50), which runs the length and breadth of the southern and western side of the neighbourhood, there are several bus lines linking it to public transport. Verkehrsbetriebe Glattal (VBG) bus line 781 is running through the neighbourhood on Boulevard Lilienthal. The nearby railway stations Opfikon and Glattbrugg provide access to the Zurich S-Bahn network. The Glattalbahn and VBG bus route form direct links to Zürich Oerlikon, Glattbrugg and Stettbach railway stations.

Line 10: Bahnhofstrasse/HB (Note: Only boarding as this stop lies on the turning loop of the line. Bahnhofplatz/HB is the terminus in the opposite direction) – (Bahnhofplatz/HB –) (Note: Only deboarding) Central – ETH/Universitätsspital – Seilbahn Rigiblick – Milchbuck – Sternen Oerlikon – Bhf. Oerlikon Ost – Glattpark – Lindberghplatz – Bhf. Glattbrugg – Bhf. Balsberg – Zurich Airport (Zurich)

Line 12: Stettbach – Glatt – Bhf. Wallisellen – Glattpark – Lindberghplatz – Bhf. Glattbrugg – Bhf. Balsberg – Zurich Airport (Zurich)

Line 50: Frankental – Escher-Wyss-Platz – Sihlquai/HB – Schaffhauserplatz – Bucheggplatz – Bhf. Oerlikon – Glattpark – Auzelg

Line 781: Bhf. Oerlikon – Glattpark, Wright-Strasse – Glattpark, Chavez-Allee – Glattpark, Lindbergh-Allee – Lindberghplatz – Opfikon, Giebeleichstrasse

=== Private ===
On the western side, the four-lane Thurgauerstrasse leads to the intersection of Opfikon with the Highway A51 (airport motorway).

== See also ==
- Glatt
- Glatt Valley
- Leutschenpark
