= Glattzentrum =

Shopping mall in Wallisellen, Switzerland

Coordinates: 47.408901°N 8.59509°E

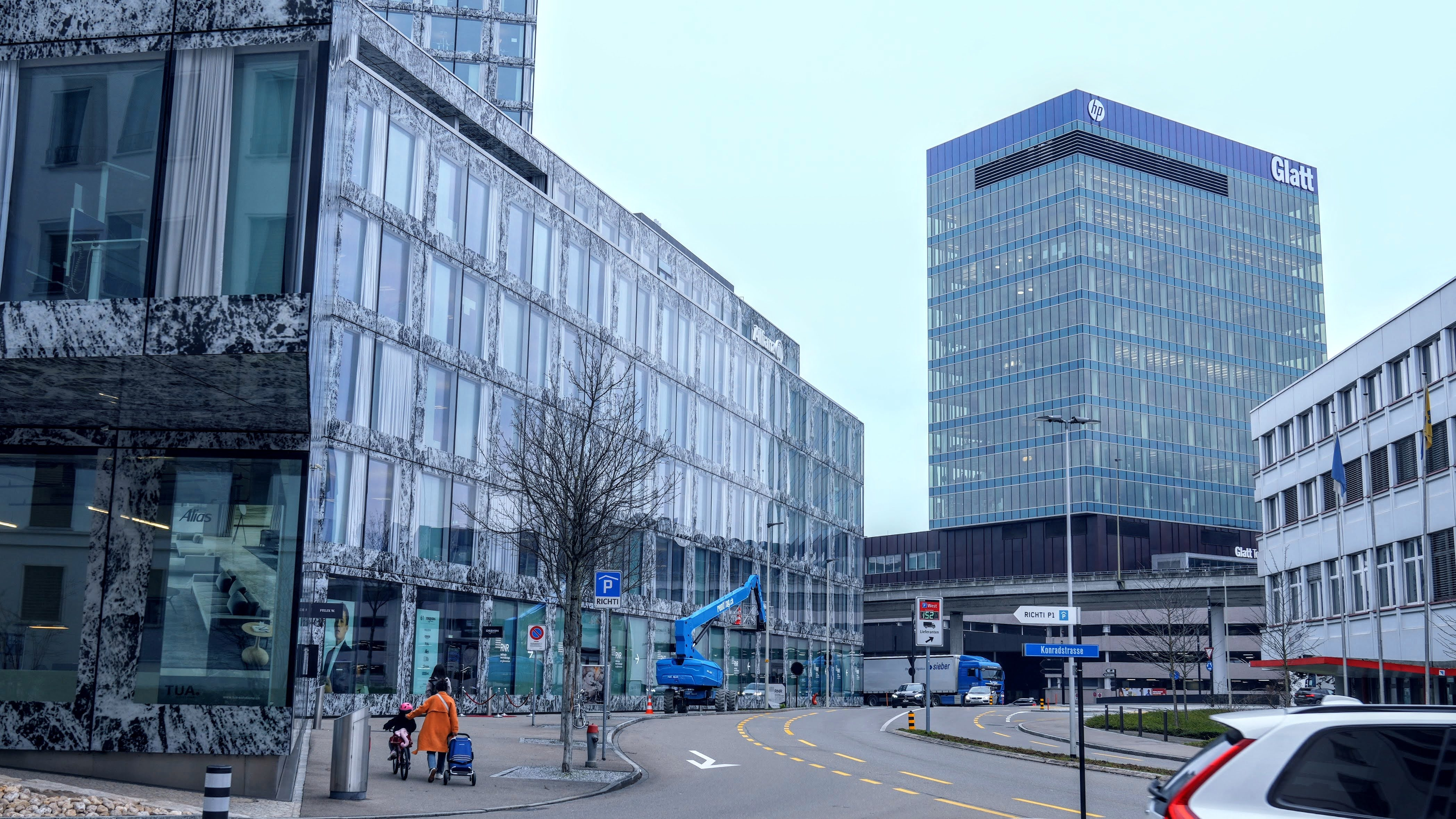
- View of the Glattzentrum with Business Center Glatt Tower in 2024 (Photo: Peter Arnold)
- Location: Wallisellen, Canton of Zurich, Switzerland
- Opened: 1975 (51 years ago)
- Owner: Swiss Life
- Website: www.glatt.ch/en/

The Glattzentrum, more formally known as the Einkaufszentrum Glatt or Glatt shopping centre, is a shopping mall located in the Glatt Valley close to the Swiss city of Zurich. Politically, the mall is situated in the municipality of Wallisellen. As of 2025, the mall hosts over 100 shops, 16 restaurants, and other facilities.

In front of Glattzentrum is the newly built open-air Richti shopping center.

== History ==
The mall (size in square meters is unknown) was opened in 1975, being modeled on similar malls in the United States. When built, the mall was jointly owned by the Migros, Globus and Jelmoli groups, each of which operated an anchor store within the centre. Today the mall is owned by Swiss Life. The Migros store still exists, as does the (now Migros owned) Globus store, but Jelmoli no longer has any involvement. In addition to the two remaining anchor stores, there are four specialty markets, five restaurants, four bars and 90 specialty shops.

The last renovation of the Glatt shopping center took place between mid-2015 and the end of 2019. The total cost of the renovation was around 100 million Swiss francs. The Glatt Tower, which houses office space and services, rises above the shopping center. HP and Hewlett Packard Enterprise have been prominent tenants in the Glatt Tower since 2020.

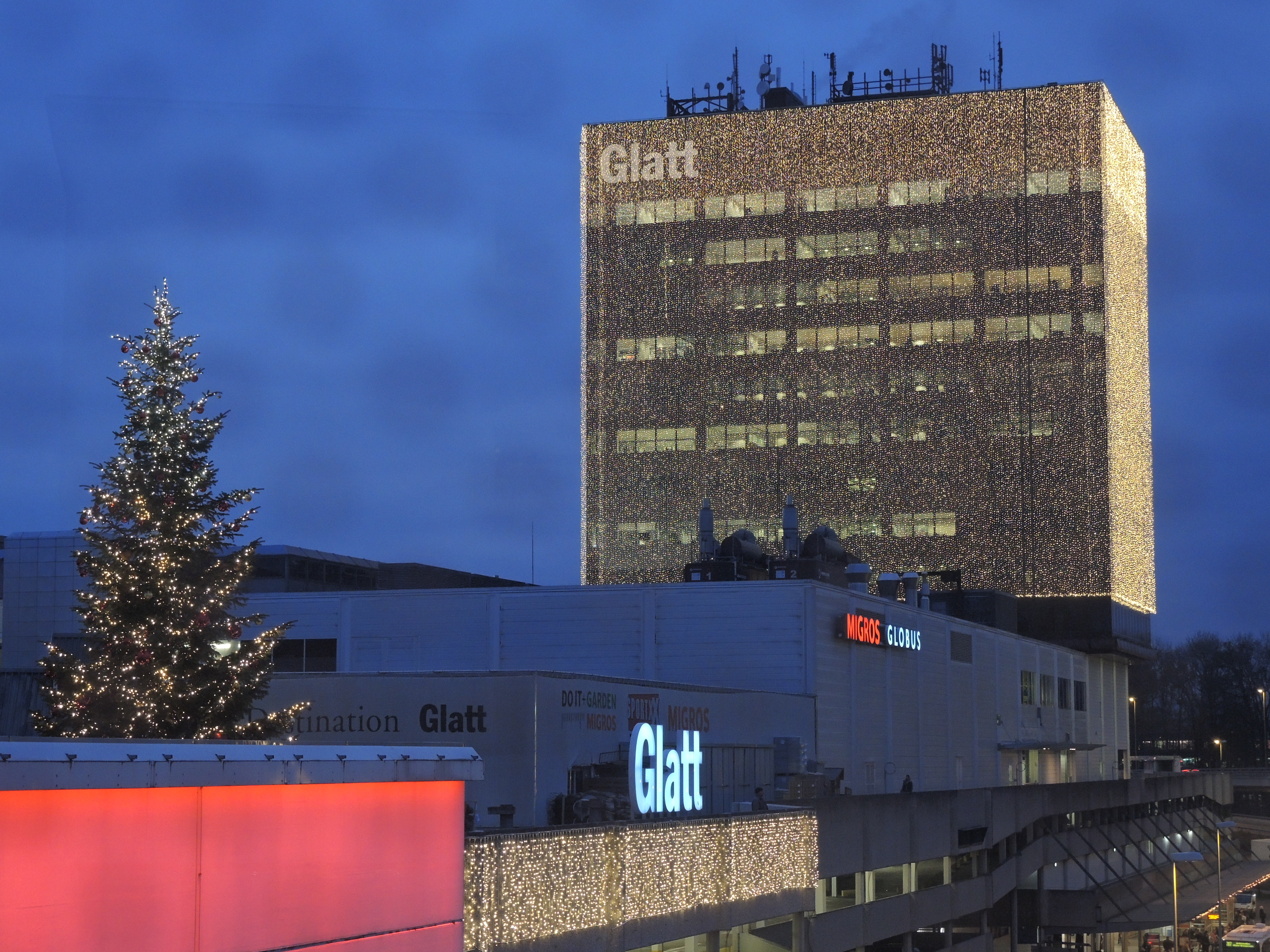
Glattzentrum in 2013

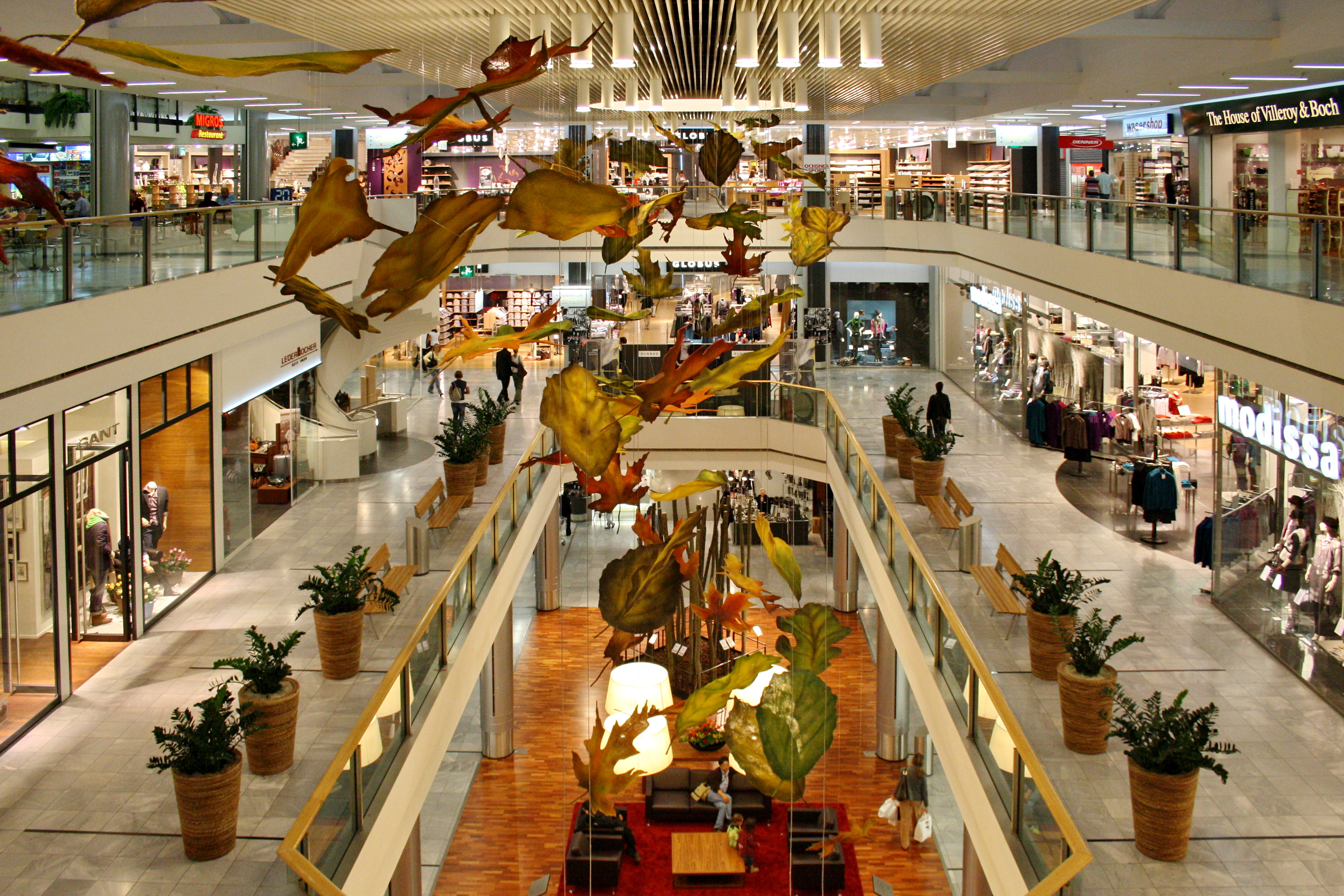
The interior of the mall

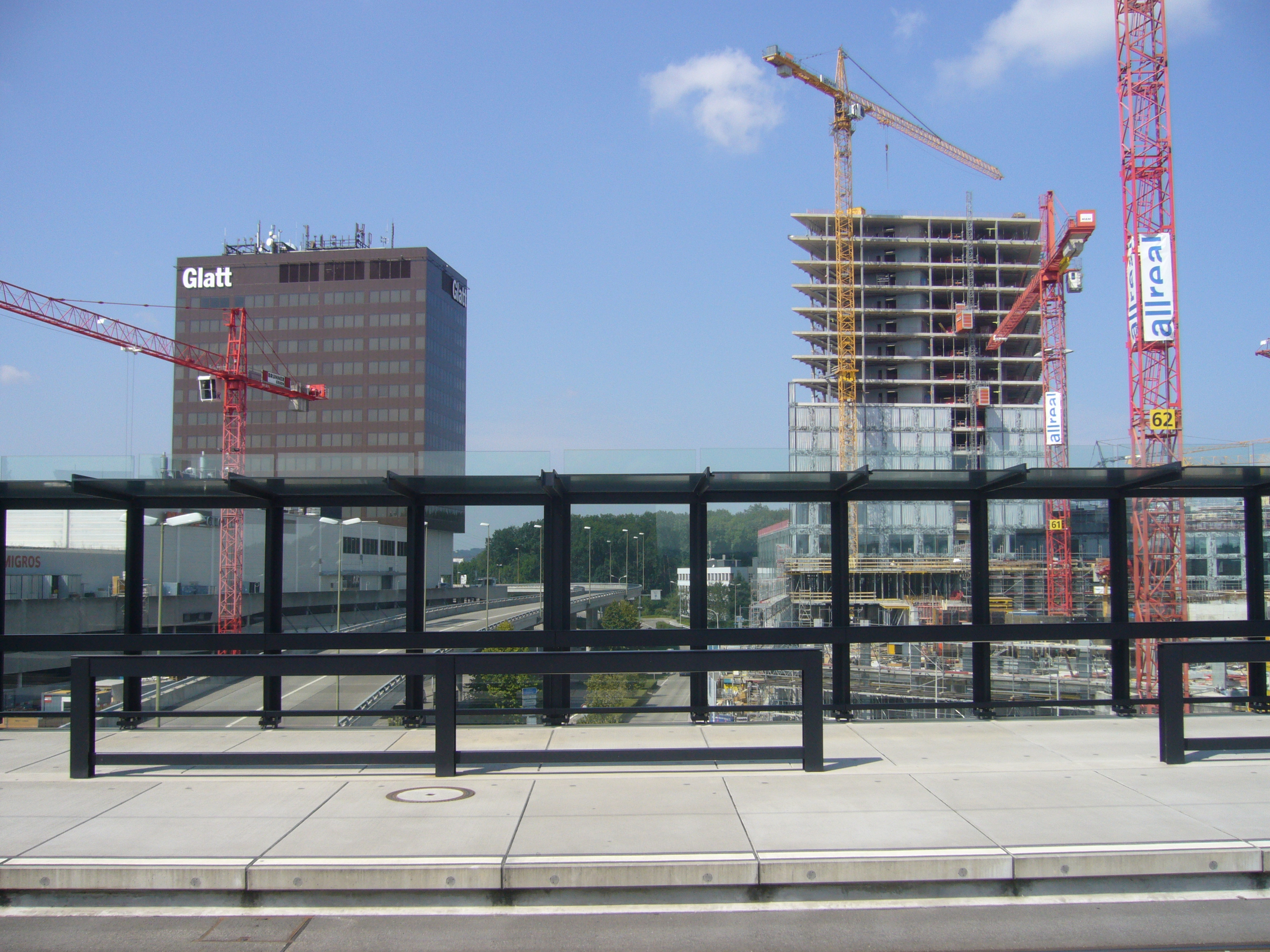
GlattTower & Allianz tower

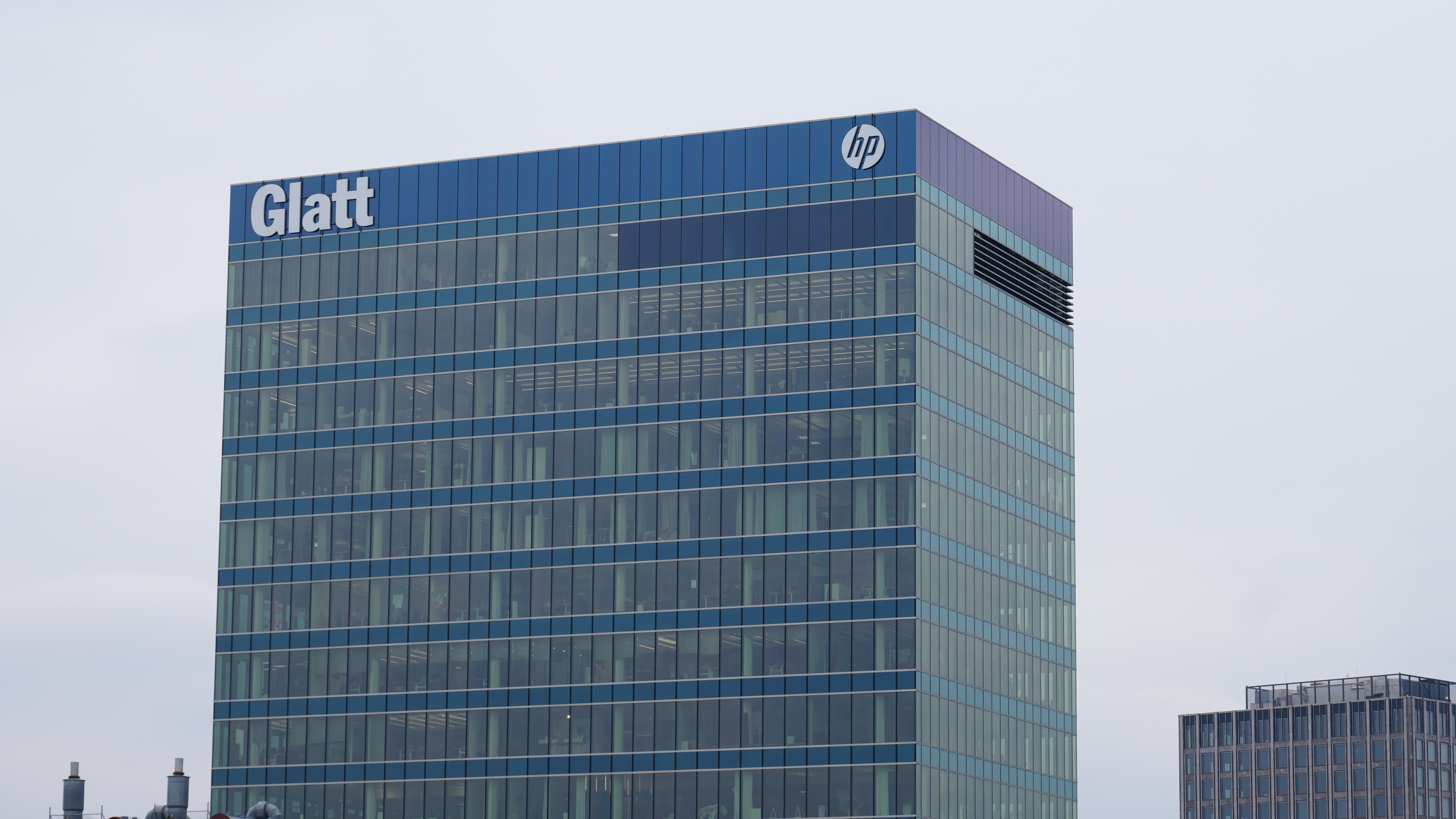
Glattzentrum with Business Center Glatt Tower after the renovation (Photo: Peter Arnold)

== Transport ==
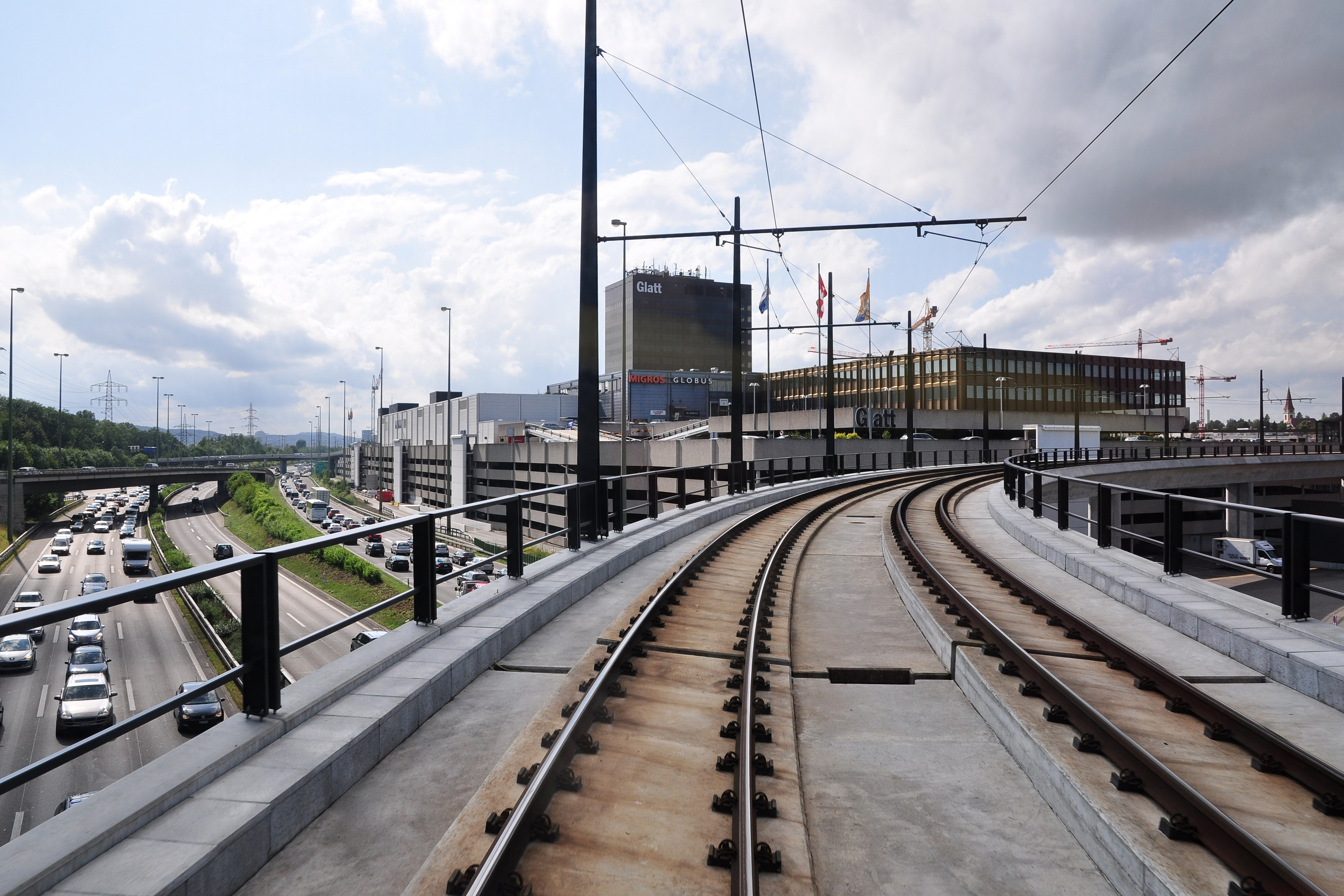
Exterior of the mall, showing access by motorway and tramway

Like its progenitors in the United States, the mall was intended to be accessible by car, and it is therefore located close to the A1 motorway and provides spacious car parking.

In 2010, phase 2 of the Stadtbahn Glattal opened, including an elevated tram stop linked to the mall by a footbridge. Before that, the public transportation connections were limited to three bus lines (lines 94, 759 and 787) connecting the center to the railway stations of Zürich Airport, Zürich Oerlikon, Dübendorf, Wallisellen and Dietlikon. Glattzentrum is located within fare zone 121 of the Zürcher Verkehrsverbund (ZVV).

As of 2025, Glattzentrum (the stop is called "Glatt") is called by the following public transportation services:

- Tram line 12 (Glatttalbahn) links the shopping mall with Wallisellen/Stettbach railway stations and Zurich Airport, via Glattpark. The line is connected with the tram network of Zurich.
- Verkehrsbetriebe Zürich (VBZ) bus line 61 runs between Glattzentrum and Zürich Oerlikon railway station and Zurich Affoltern quarter.
- Verkehrsbetriebe Glattal (VBG) bus lines 759 and 787 to Wangen, Dübendorf, Wallisellen, Zurich Oerlikon and Zurich Airport.

== See also ==
- Europaallee
- ShopVille
- Sihlcity
