= Wallisellen railway station =

Swiss railway station

Wallisellen
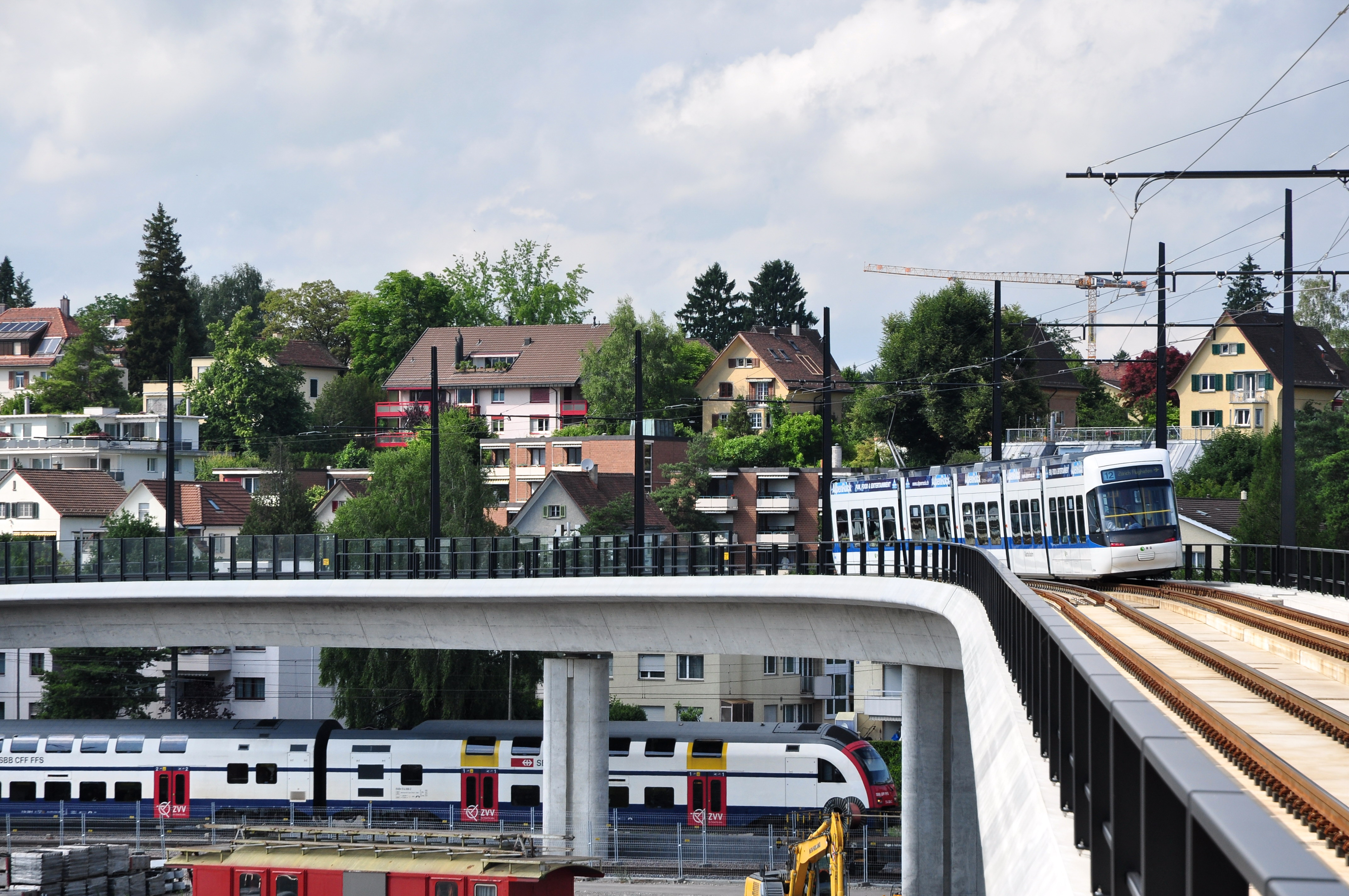
- A tram descends into Wallisellen station from the Stadtbahn viaduct, whilst an S-Bahn train departs

General information
- Location: Bahnhofplatz, Wallisellen, Canton of Zurich, Switzerland
- Coordinates: 47.412153°N 8.592296°E
- Elevation: 431 m (1,414 ft)
- Owner: Swiss Federal Railways
- Operator: Swiss Federal Railways
- Line: Zürich–Winterthur; Wallisellen–Uster–Rapperswil
- Platforms: 2 island platforms
- Connections
- Tram: VBZ / VBG tram line 12
- Bus: VBG bus routes 759 752 771 772 773
- Airport: VBG bus 759 in 0:22h, light rail 12 in 0:24h to/from Zurich Airport

Other information
- Fare zone: 121 (ZVV)

Passengers
- 2025: 13,300 per day (SBB)
- Rank: 62 out of 1,095

Services
Preceding station	Zurich S-Bahn	Following station
Zürich Oerlikon towards Pfäffikon SZ	S8	Dietlikon towards Winterthur
Zürich Oerlikon towards Affoltern am Albis	S14	Dübendorf towards Hinwil
Zürich Oerlikon towards Koblenz	S19	Dietlikon towards Pfäffikon ZH
Zürich Oerlikon towards Lachen	SN8 Limited service	Dietikon towards Pfäffikon ZH
Location
- Location within Switzerland Location within Canton of Zürich

Wallisellen is a railway station in the municipality of Wallisellen in the canton of Zurich, Switzerland. It lies within fare zone 121 of the Zürcher Verkehrsverbund (ZVV). It is located on the Zurich to Winterthur railway line, and is to the Zurich side of the junction with the Wallisellen to Rapperswil via Uster line.

The Glattalbahn light rail has a stop next to the station building. The railway station is adjacent to the newly built Richti Shopping development and near the Glattzentrum shopping mall.

== Layout ==
Wallisellen is served by four mainline tracks (Gleis), numbered 3 to 6 (tracks 1 and 2 correspond to the Glattalbahn), accessed by two island platforms. Track 3 is used by eastbound trains to Effretikon and Hinwil, and track 4 by westbound trains to Zurich and beyond. Tracks 5 and 6 are not currently used in scheduled service.

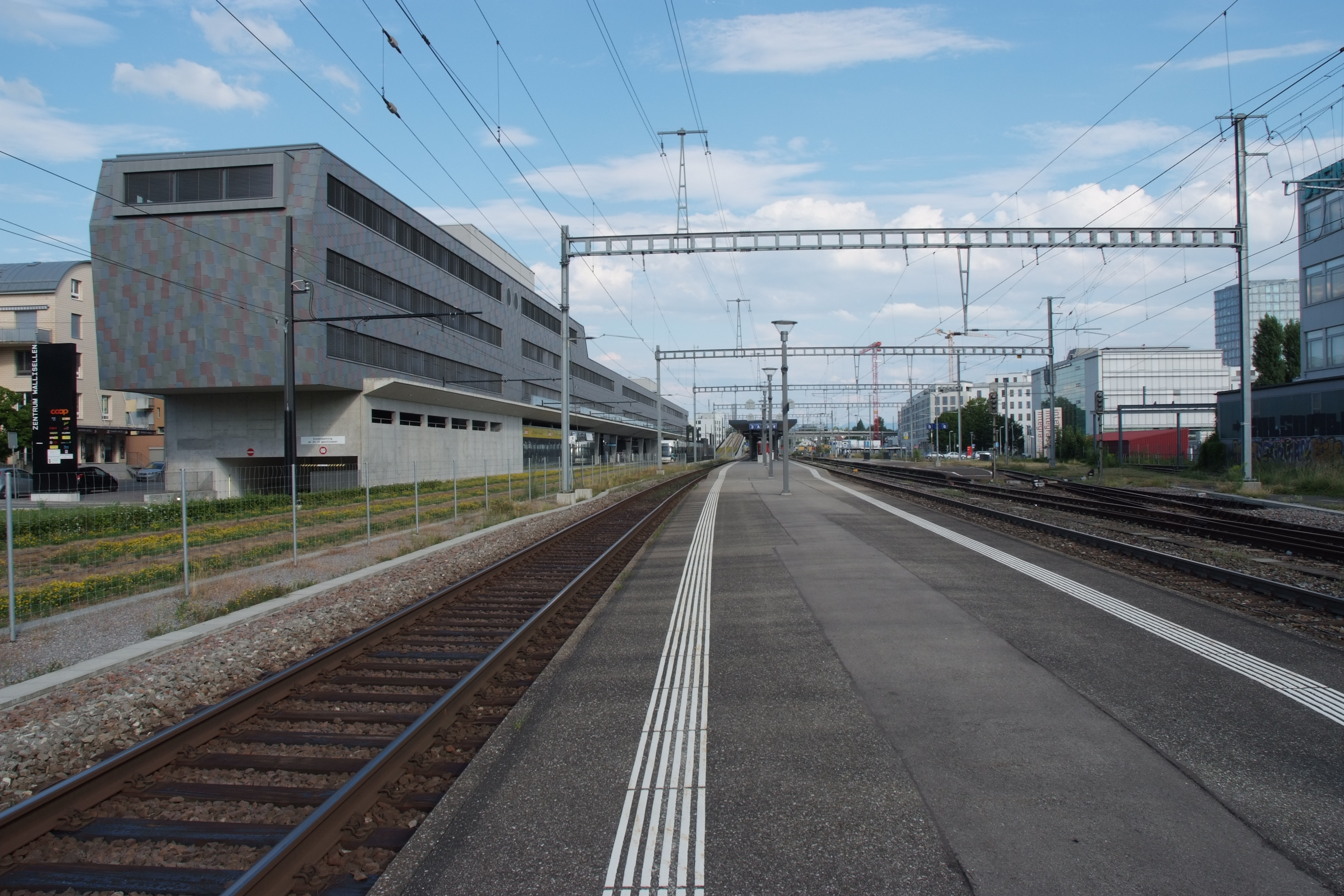
The station looking east, with Glattalbahn tracks on grassed reservation to left

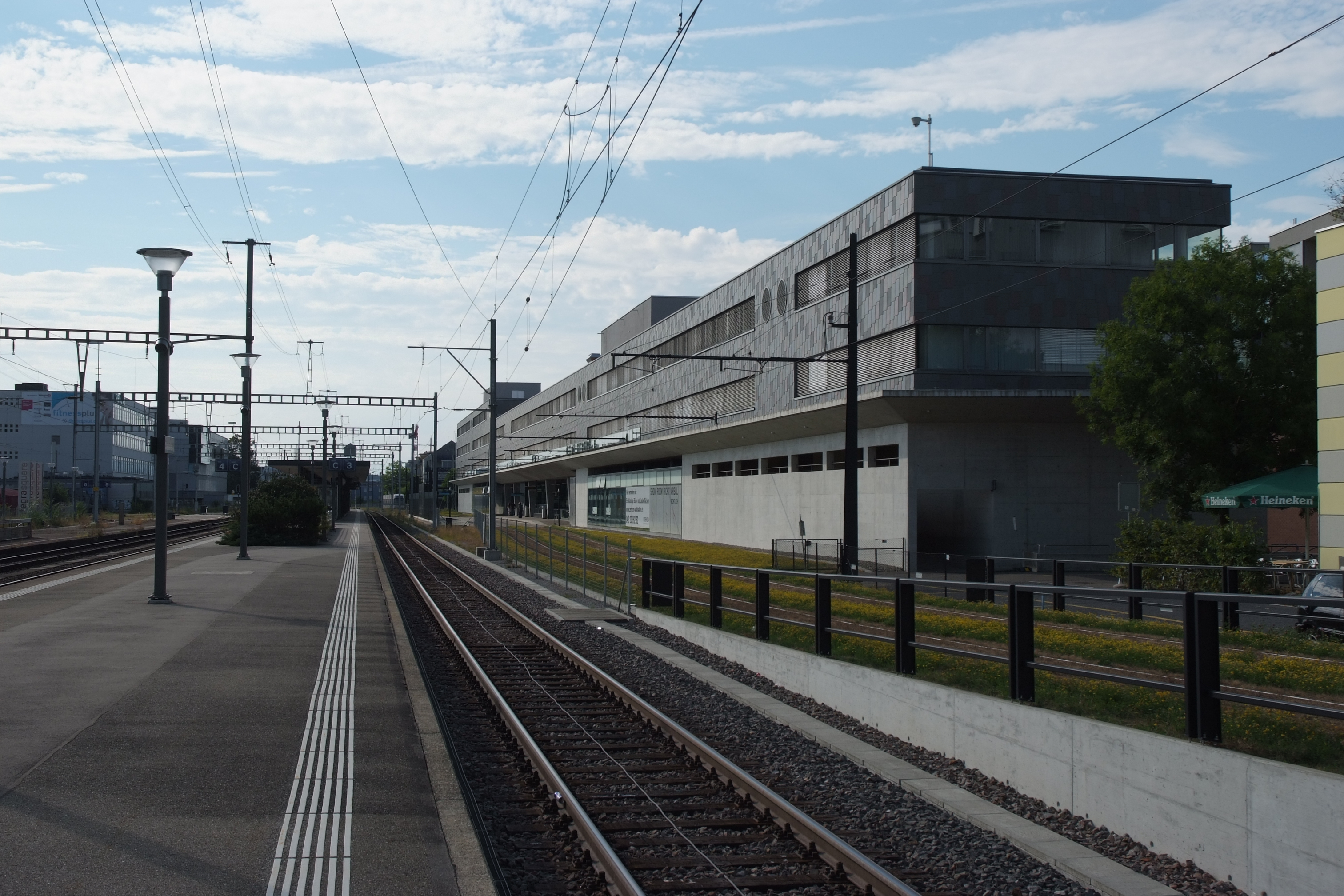
The station looking west, with Glattalbahn platforms visible to right

== Service ==
The station is an interchange point between the Zurich S-Bahn (lines S8, S14 and S19) and the Glattalbahn light rail line 12. On weekends, there is also a nighttime S-Bahn services (SN8) offered by ZVV.

=== S-Bahn ===
Summary of S-Bahn services:

- Zurich S-Bahn:
  - S8: half-hourly service to Pfäffikon SZ via Zürich HB, and to Winterthur.
  - S14: half-hourly service to Affoltern am Albis via Zürich HB, and to Hinwil.
  - S19: half-hourly service to Dietikon (during peak hours to Koblenz) via Zürich HB, and to Effretikon (during peak hours to Pfäffikon ZH).
- Nighttime S-Bahn:
  - SN8: hourly service between Lachen via Zürich Oerlikon, and to Pfäffikon ZH

=== Tram / Bus ===
Tracks 1 and 2 of the station are served by the Glattalbahn:

Line 12: Stettbach – Glatt – Bhf. Wallisellen – Glattpark – Bhf. Glattbrugg – Bhf. Balsberg – Zurich Airport (Zurich)

The station forecourt has bus stops served by several lines of Verkehrsbetriebe Glattal (VBG).

== See also ==
- Glatt Valley
- Rail transport in Switzerland
