= Illnau railway station =

Railway station in Illnau-Effretikon, Switzerland

Illnau
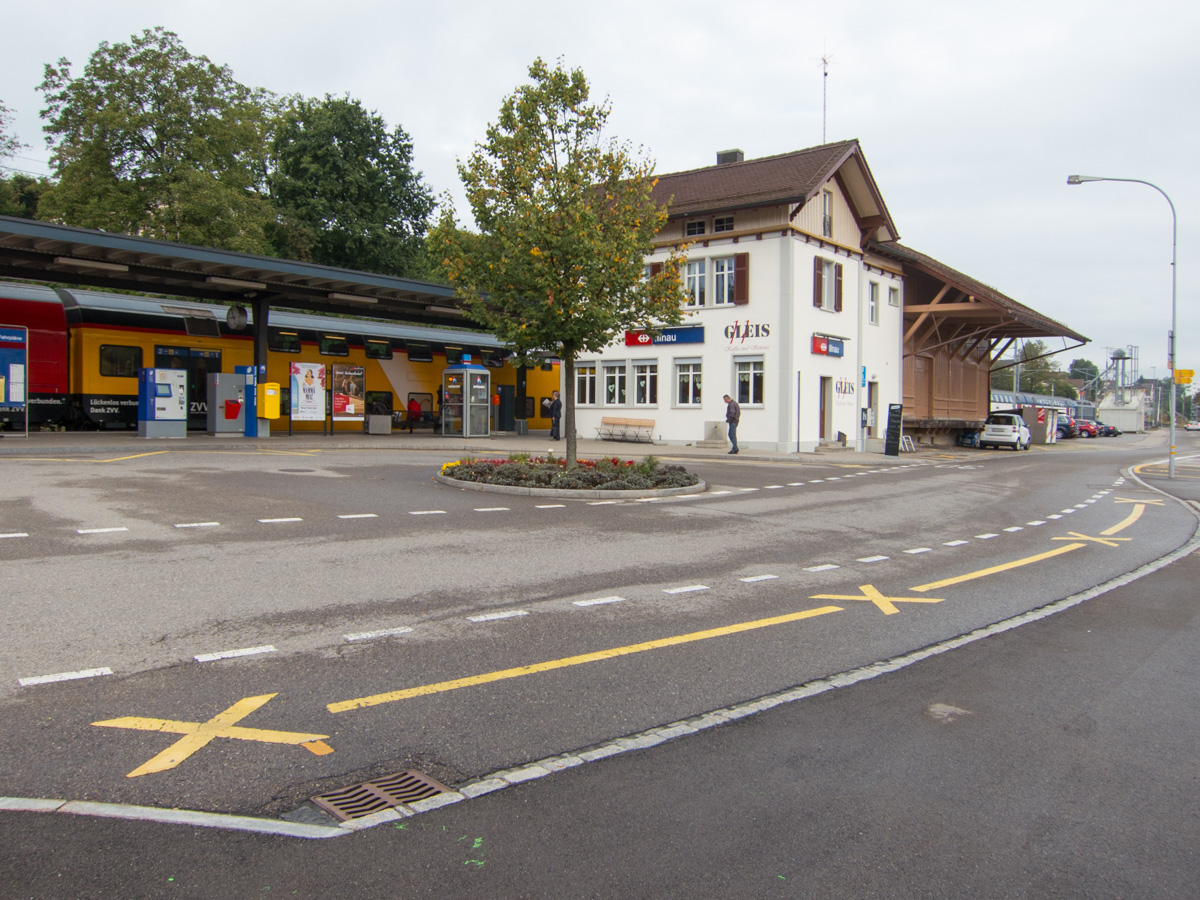
- The station in 2013

General information
- Location: Illnau, Illnau-Effretikon, Canton of Zurich, Switzerland
- Coordinates: 47.408875°N 8.722849°E
- Elevation: 517 m (1,696 ft)
- Owner: Swiss Federal Railways
- Operator: Swiss Federal Railways
- Line: Effretikon–Hinwil line
- Platforms: 2 side platforms
- Tracks: 2
- Connections
- Bus: VBG buses 640 652

Other information
- Fare zone: 122 (ZVV)

Passengers
- 2018: 2,400 per weekday

Services
Preceding station	Zurich S-Bahn	Following station
Effretikon towards Bülach	S3	Fehraltorf towards Wetzikon
Effretikon towards Koblenz	S19	Fehraltorf towards Pfäffikon ZH
Effretikon towards Lachen	SN8 Limited service	Fehraltorf towards Pfäffikon ZH
Location
- Location within Switzerland Location within Canton of Zurich

Illnau is a railway station in the municipality of Illnau-Effretikon in the canton of Zurich, Switzerland. The station, which takes its name from the village of Illnau, is located on the Effretikon to Hinwil railway line, within fare zone 122 of the Zürcher Verkehrsverbund (ZVV).

== Service ==
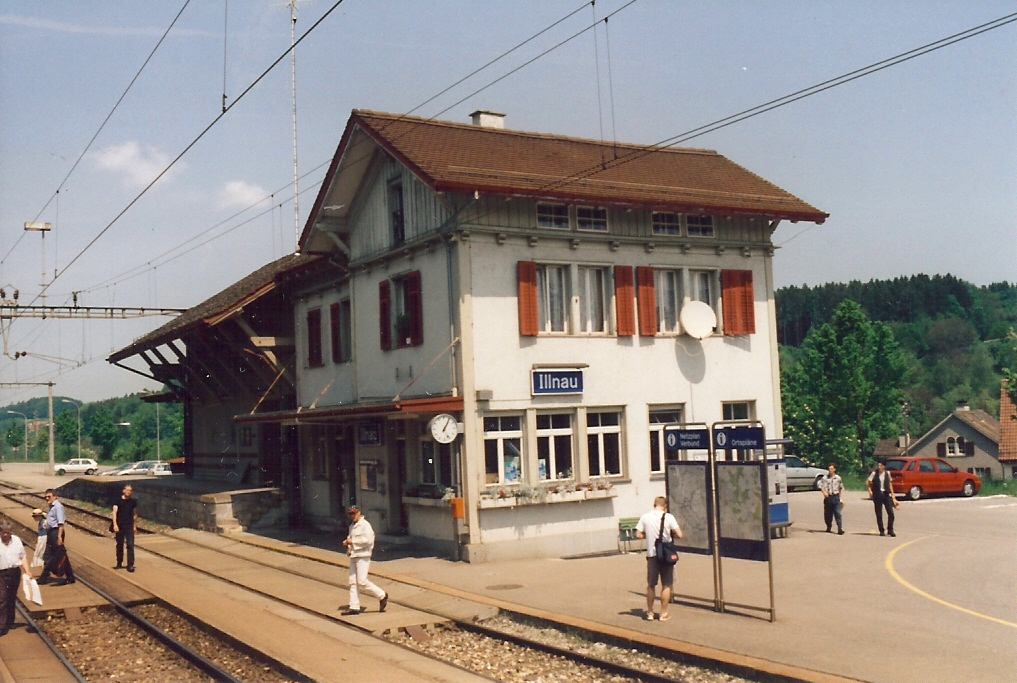
Illnau railway station in 1997

The station is served by S-Bahn trains only. It is an intermediate stop on Zurich S-Bahn service S3, which links Zürich Hardbrücke and Wetzikon via Zürich Stadelhofen and Effretikon. During peak periods, it is also served by S-Bahn service S19, which operates between Koblenz and Pfäffikon. On weekends (Friday and Saturday nights), there is a nighttime S-Bahn service (SN8) offered by ZVV. Summary of all S-Bahn services:

- Zurich S-Bahn:
  - S3: half-hourly service to Hardbrücke (or Bülach during peak hour) via Zürich HB, and to Wetzikon.
  - S19: half-hourly service during peak hours to Koblenz via Zürich HB, and to Pfäffikon ZH.
  - Nighttime S-Bahn (only during weekends):
    - SN8: hourly service to Lachen via Zürich HB, and to Pfäffikon ZH.

In addition, buses of Verkehrsbetriebe Glattal (VBG) depart from the bus station adjacent to the railway station.

== See also ==
- Rail transport in Switzerland
