= Opfikon =

- Municipality
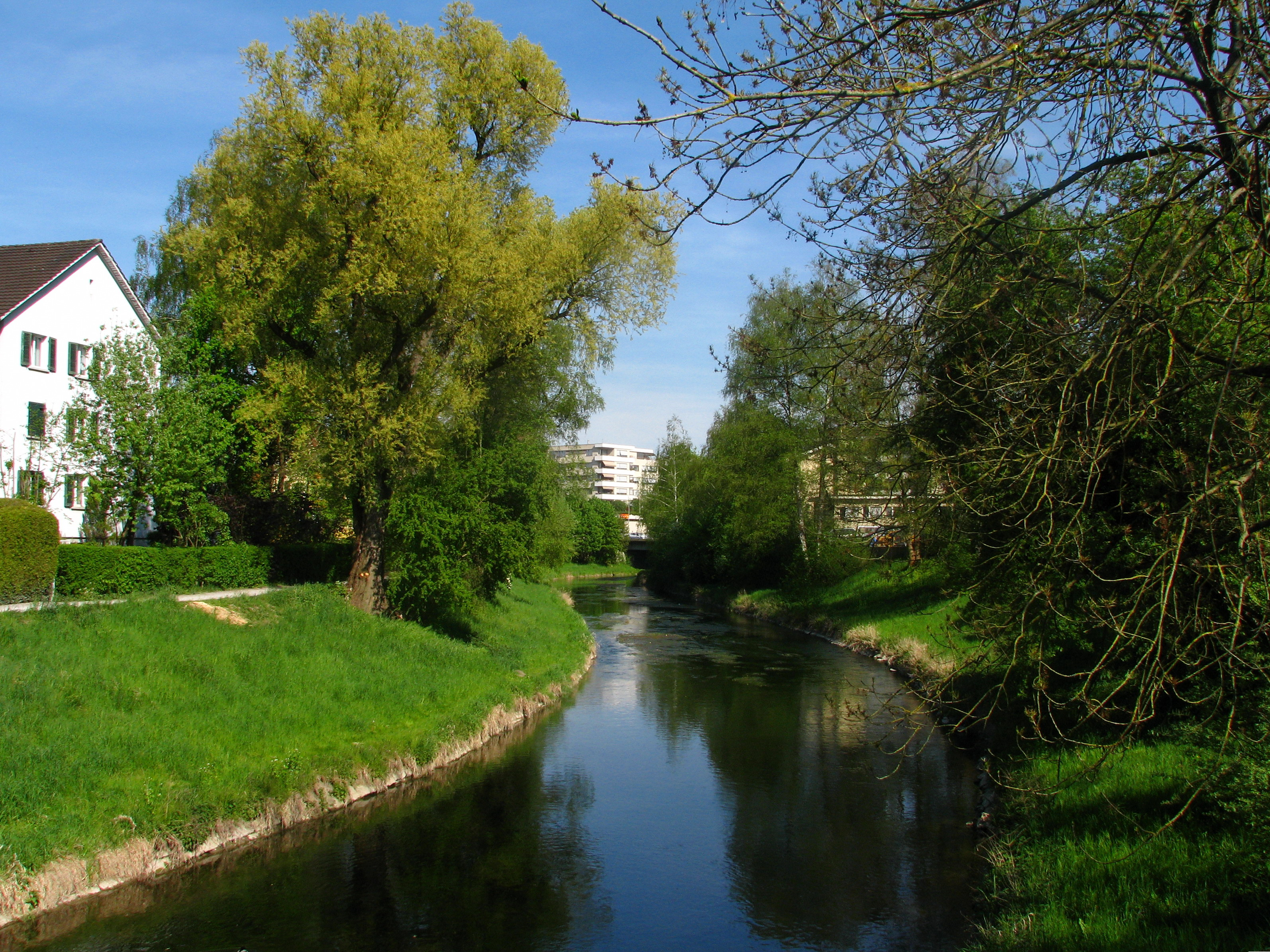

- Flag Coat of arms
- Location of Opfikon
- Location within Switzerland Location within Canton of Zürich
- Coordinates: 47°26′N 8°34′E
- Country: Switzerland
- Canton: Zürich
- District: Bülach

Government
  - Executive: Stadtrat with 7 members
  - Mayor: Stadtpräsident; Paul Remund (as of March 2014)
  - Parliament: Gemeinderat with 36 members

Area
  - Total: 5.59 km^{2} (2.16 sq mi)
- Elevation: 459 m (1,506 ft)

Population (2025-12-31)
  - Total: 21,462
  - Density: 3,840/km^{2} (9,940/sq mi)
- Time zone: UTC+01:00 (CET)
  - Summer (DST): UTC+02:00 (CEST)
- Postal code: 8152
- SFOS number: 66
- ISO 3166 code: CH-ZH
- Localities: Opfikon, Glattbrugg, Oberhausen
- Surrounded by: Kloten, Wallisellen, Zürich, Rümlang
- Website: www.opfikon.ch

Opfikon (German pronunciation: [ˈɔpfikoːn]; in the local Swiss German dialect: [ˈopfikxə]) is the name of a municipality in the Swiss canton of Zürich, located in the district of Bülach. It has 21,462 inhabitants.

== Etymology ==
Opfikon is formed with the place name suffix -(i)kon/-(i)ken, that is widely spread in the area of the cantons of Zürich, Argovia and Lucerne and that has been merged from the suffix -ing- ("followers of the mentioned one") and the word hof ("landed estate") in the dative plural form, used as a locative. This origin is yet more obvious at the congenerous place names ending in -(i)kofen, frequent in the cantons of Bern, Solothurn, and also in Thurgovia; place names of this formation are dated to the 7th/8th century. The first part of the name traces back to an anthroponym *Opfo, that, however, as such is not on record and is regarded either as a short form of a name like Otfried or something similar or as a formation from a supposed stem *upp-, forming names in west Germanic, which would have developed to OHG *opf-/upf-.

The oldest ensured evidence of the name (Obtinchofa/Obfinchoven) dates back to 1153; the attribution of an earlier record Ubinchova in a document from the year 744 is doubtful.

== History ==
The present municipality traces back to two settlements, one of which is Opfikon itself, situated right from the river Glatt, whereas on the other side of it lies Oberhusen. Glattbrugg, as its name ("bridge over the Glatt") suggests, originally was not a settlement, but a passage of some importance. However, the name was later also used for a smithy and a mill that were built near the bridge at the left-hand riverbank, and round which eventually developed another settlement.

When the whole political order was changed during the Helvetic Republic (1798–1803), Opfikon became part of the municipality of Kloten, that pertained to the district of Bassersdorf. Oberhusen, lying on the other side of the Glatt, fell to the commune of Seebach belonging to the district of Regensdorf.

After Napoleon's Act of Mediation (19 February 1803) the administration of the canton of Zürich was rearranged again, and Opfikon and Oberhusen were united into a commune named Opfikon, which appertained now to the likewise new-formed district of Bülach. In the course of the Restoration after the end of the Napoleonic era, the commune of Opfikon, consisting of the two civil communities Opfikon and Oberhusen (with Glattbrugg) established in 1815, became part of the chief district (Oberamt) of Embrach, that in 1831, as a result of the new-established cantonal constitution, changed its capital to Bülach. In 1918 the two civil communities were merged in the already existing political commune of Opfikon.

Due to the growing importance of the former hamlet Glattbrugg, the name Oberhusen is the longer the less used, and the municipality as a whole is now often called Opfikon-Glattbrugg to draw a distinction to Opfikon proper as a part of it.

Since the 1950s, Opfikon and Glattbrugg have seen a large growth. In particular since the 1980s, an important source of the growth of Opfikon and Glattbrugg is caused by immigration from Portugal, Kosovo, the Albanian part of Macedonia and Serbia. Recently, there has also been significant non-european immigration, among others from Turkey, India, Syria and Iraq.

Aerial view (1968)

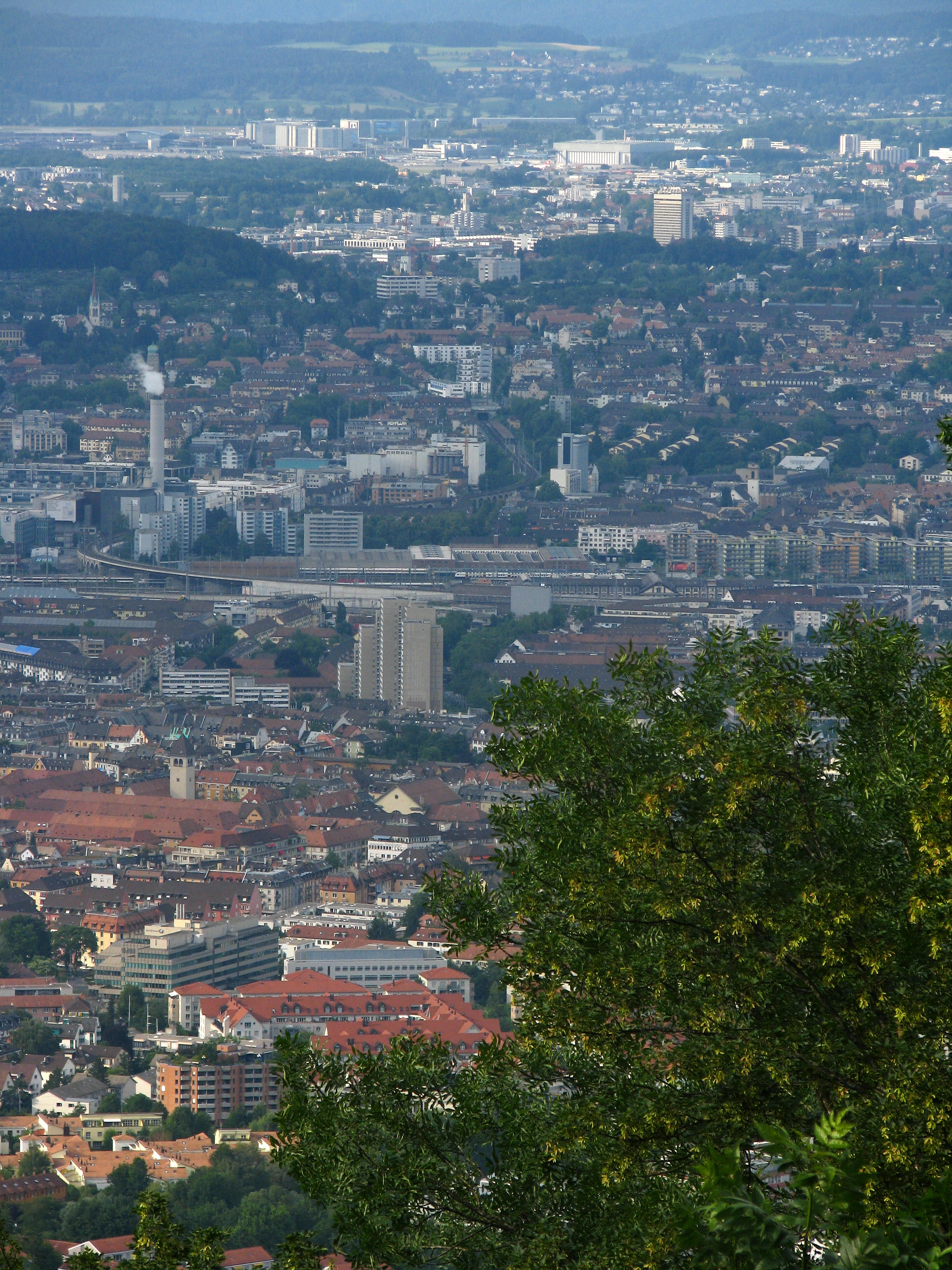
Zürich, Opfikon and Kloten as seen from the Albis

== Geography ==
Opfikon is situated right to the northeast of the city of Zürich in the Glatt Valley, near Zurich Airport, and thus lies within the greater Zürich area. As it belongs to the region known as the Zurichois Lowlands (Zürcher Unterland), the landscape is rather flat. The lowest point lies 420.4 m above sea level at the border to the neighboring commune of Rümlang, the highest one in the Hard forest, 481 m above sea level. 37% of the municipal territory is covered by settlement area, 17% by wood, 27% by farming ground, 17.6% by transport infrastructures and 1.2% by waters.

== Demographics ==
As of 31 December 2024, the population is 436,551, of whom 52.1% are males and 47.9% are females. Minors make up 18.6% of the population, and seniors make up 12.0%.

Most of the population (as of 2000) speaks German (72.5%), with Italian being second most common (5.5%) and Serbo-Croatian being third (3.1%).

In Opfikon about 64.4% of the population (between age 25–64) have completed either non-mandatory upper secondary education or additional higher education (either university or a Fachhochschule).

Historical population

Year	Pop.	±%
1850	611	—
1860	577	−5.6%
1870	572	−0.9%
1880	588	+2.8%
1888	573	−2.6%
1900	706	+23.2%
1910	910	+28.9%
1920	1,082	+18.9%
1930	1,268	+17.2%

Year	Pop.	±%
1941	1,549	+22.2%
1950	2,613	+68.7%
1960	7,749	+196.6%
1970	11,115	+43.4%
1980	11,444	+3.0%
1990	11,872	+3.7%
2000	12,062	+1.6%
2010	15,573	+29.1%
2020	20,954	+34.6%

Source: FSO

In 1467, Opfikon had 7 households, and in 1634 it had 26 inhabitants (Oberhausen had 9 households).

Among Christian churches, there is the Arulmihu Sivan Temple located in Glattbrugg.

=== Foreign population ===
As of 31 December 2024, immigrants make up 54.3% of the population, and foreign citizens make up 46.3% of the total population. The 5 largest foreign countries of citizenship are Italy, Germany, Portugal, Spain, and India.

== Coat of arms ==
Blazon: Party per fess gules and argent, in chief a half length portrait of a man wearing a coat sable with a white collar, in base cross pattee sable.

== Politics ==
The results of the 2 April 2006 elections for the municipal parliament were as follows:

Party	SVP (Swiss People's Party)	FDP (Free Democratic Party)	GV (Municipal Association)	CVP (Christian Democratic People's Party)	EVP (Evangelical People's Party)	SP (Socialist Party)	SD (Swiss Democrats)	GLP (Green Liberal Party)	SVP Young Civil List
Seats	10	4	5	4	3	5	1	2	2

The President of the municipality is Walter Fehr (Gemeindeverein ‚Municipal Association’)

In the 2007 National Council elections the most popular party was the SVP which received 48.3% of the vote. The next three most popular parties were the SPS (15.5%), the FDP (9.9%) and the CVP (9.4%).

== Economy ==
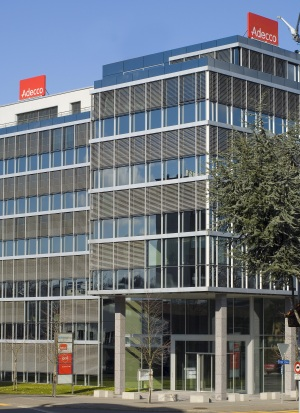
Adecco headquarters in Opfikon

Thanks in part to its favourable location between the city centre and Zurich airport, several large companies have their headquarters in Opfikon. Adecco is one of the world's largest providers of personnel services and at the same time one of the largest employers on the planet. Swissport is the world's largest service company for airlines and airports. Hotelplan is the second-largest Swiss tour operator, and its subsidiary Interhome provides around 50,000 holiday homes and apartments in 31 countries. The Nuance Group operates 400 shops at 60 airports in 20 countries. Trivadis is an independent IT services company with 700 employees at 14 locations in Switzerland, Germany, Austria and Denmark. VBG Verkehrsbetriebe Glattal AG operates public transport in the Glattal and Furttal regions and in the Effretikon/Volketswil area on behalf of the Zurich Transport Association (ZVV) as the company with market responsibility (MVU). These are joined by Mondelez Europe and Cadillac Europe as well as the Swiss airline Zimex.

Belair Airlines, a subsidiary of Air Berlin, was headquartered in Glattbrugg. In addition Swissport, Germania Flug, and Zimex Aviation have their head offices in Glattbrugg.

Kraft Foods Europe has its head office in Glattpark, Opfikon. China Airlines, at one point, operated the Switzerland Branch office in Glattbrugg.

Opfikon has an unemployment rate of 4.63%. As of 2005, there were 80 people employed in the primary economic sector and about 13 businesses involved in this sector. 1510 people are employed in the secondary sector and there are 121 businesses in this sector. 14456 people are employed in the tertiary sector, with 752 businesses in this sector.

== Education ==
The Schule Opfikon, the communal school, has classes in the Lättenwiesen, Oberhausen, Mettlen, Bubenholz and Halden campuses in Glattbrugg. The Musikschule is in Glattbrugg.

== Transport ==
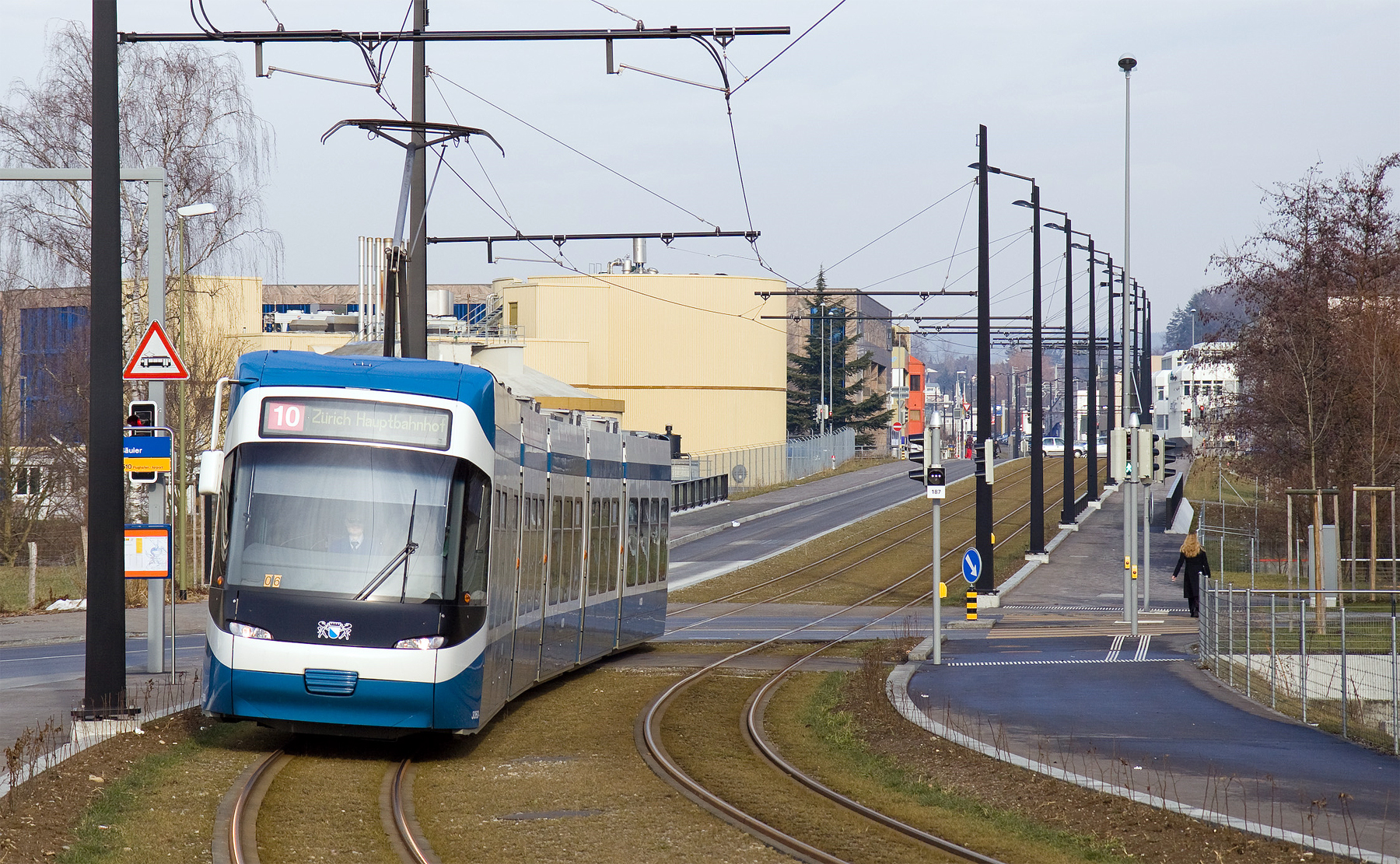
The Stadtbahn Glattal in Opfikon

Opfikon is served by two railway stations, Glattbrugg and Opfikon, which are on different lines but only some 250 metres (820 ft) apart. Opfikon is served by Zürich S-Bahn line S7, whilst Glattbrugg is served by S-Bahn lines S9 and S15. Opfikon is an 11-minute ride from Zürich Hauptbahnhof by S-Bahn.

Opfikon is also served by the Stadtbahn Glattal, a light rail system that interworks with the Zürich tram system, with several stops in the municipality. Routes 10 and 12 cross the municipality via Glattbrugg railway station on their journeys from Zurich Airport to, respectively, central Zürich and Stettbach railway station. Route 11 runs along the southern boundary of the municipality on its journey from central Zürich to Auzelg in the neighbouring municipality of Wallisellen.
