= Glattalbahn =

Tram system in Glattal, Zürich, Switzerland

Stadtbahn Glattal
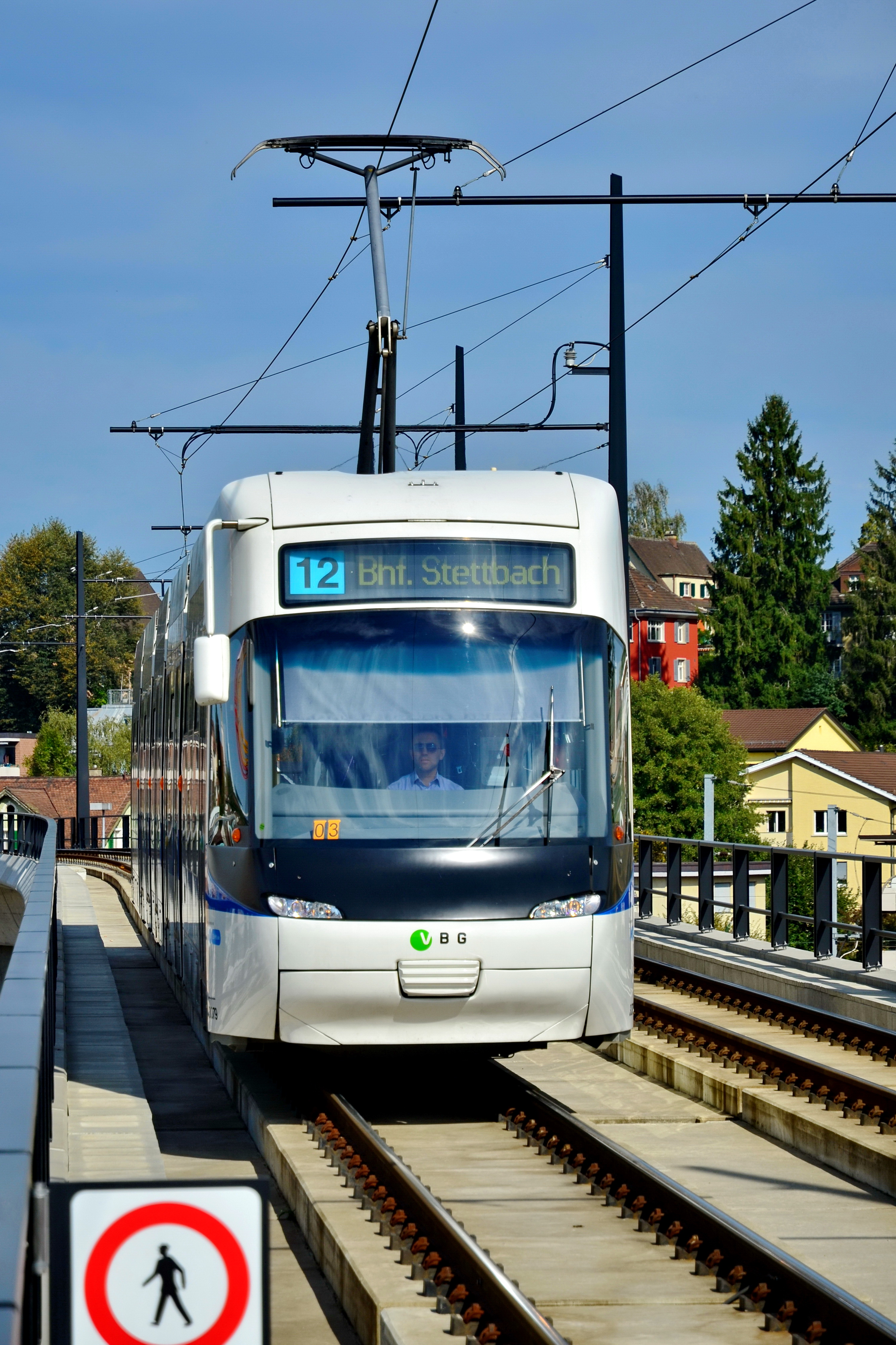
- Stadtbahn Glattal at Glattzentrum in Wallisellen

Overview
- Owner: Verkehrsbetriebe Glattal (VBG)
- Locale: Glattal; Canton of Zürich; Switzerland

Service
- Type: Light rail
- Services: 3
- Operator(s): Verkehrsbetriebe Zürich (VBZ)

History
- Opened: In phases from 2006 to 2010

Technical
- Line length: 12.7 km (7.9 mi)
- Track gauge: 1,000 mm (3 ft 3 3/8 in) metre gauge
- Electrification: 600 V DC Overhead catenary

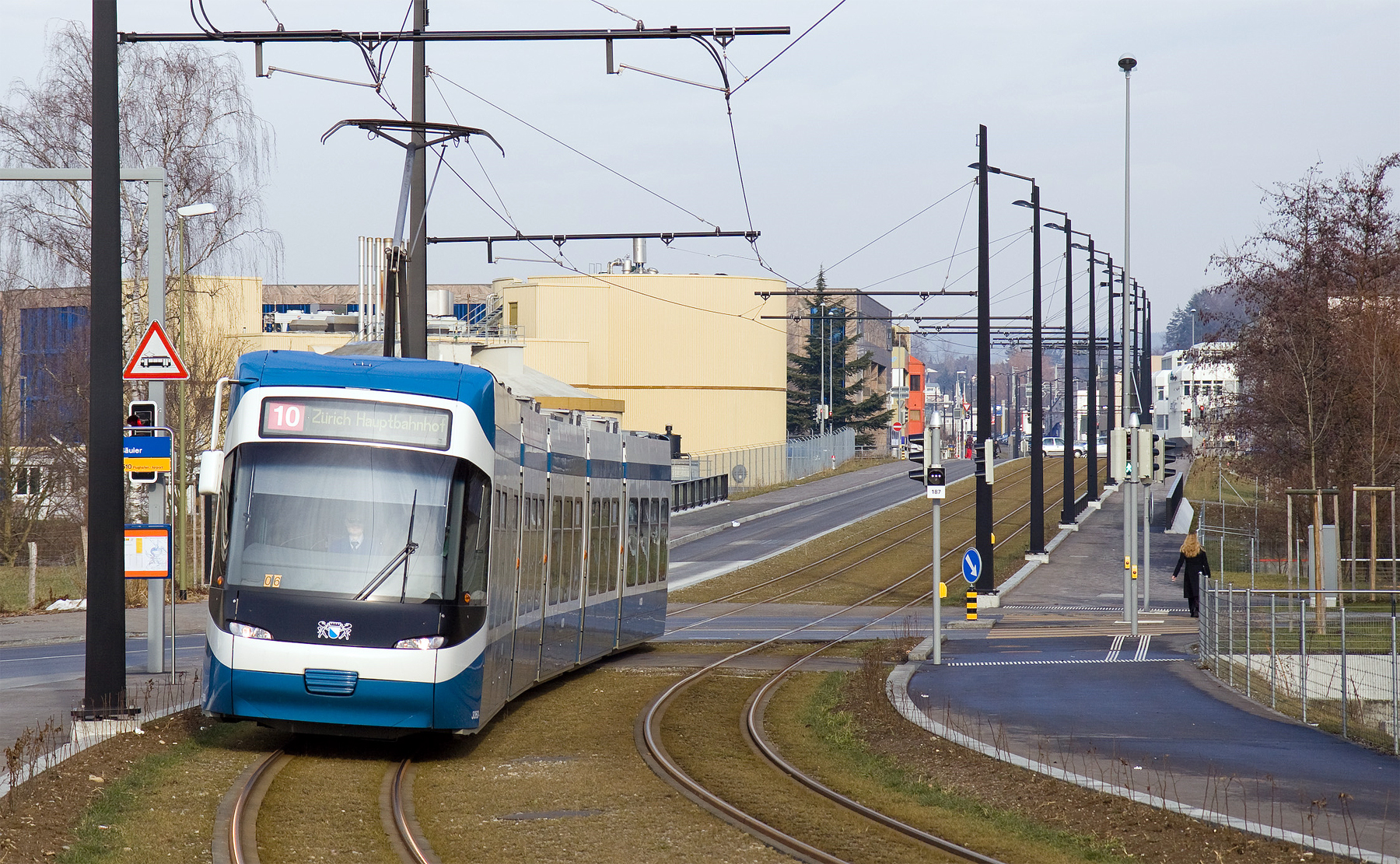
Glattalbahn (Phase 2) near Glattbrugg, with Cobra tram in VBZ colours

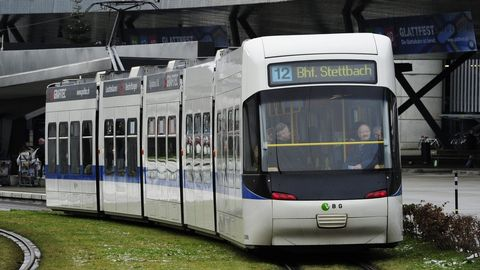
Bombardier Cobra tram in VBG colours

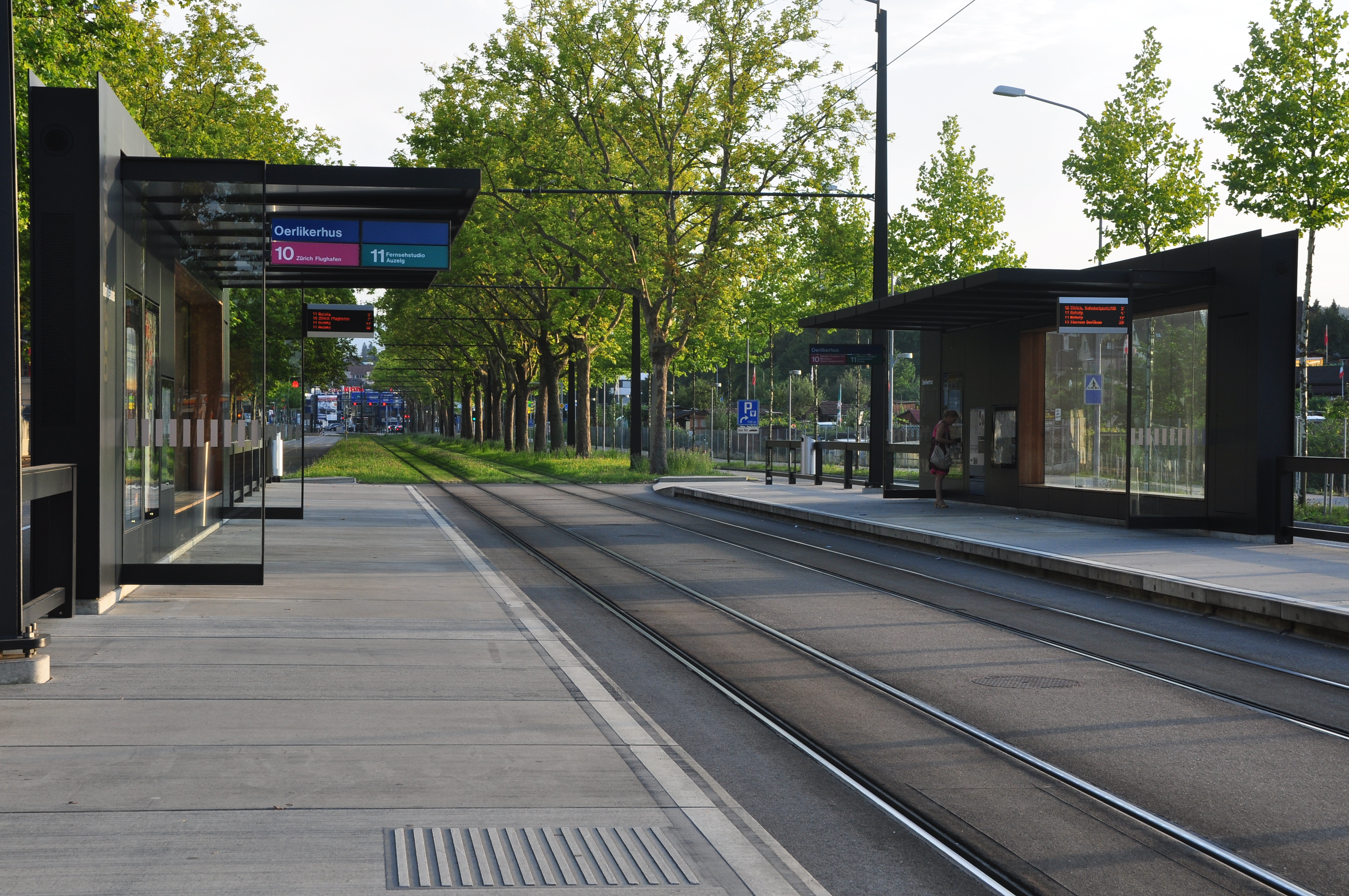
A typical Stadtbahn stop at Örlikerhaus

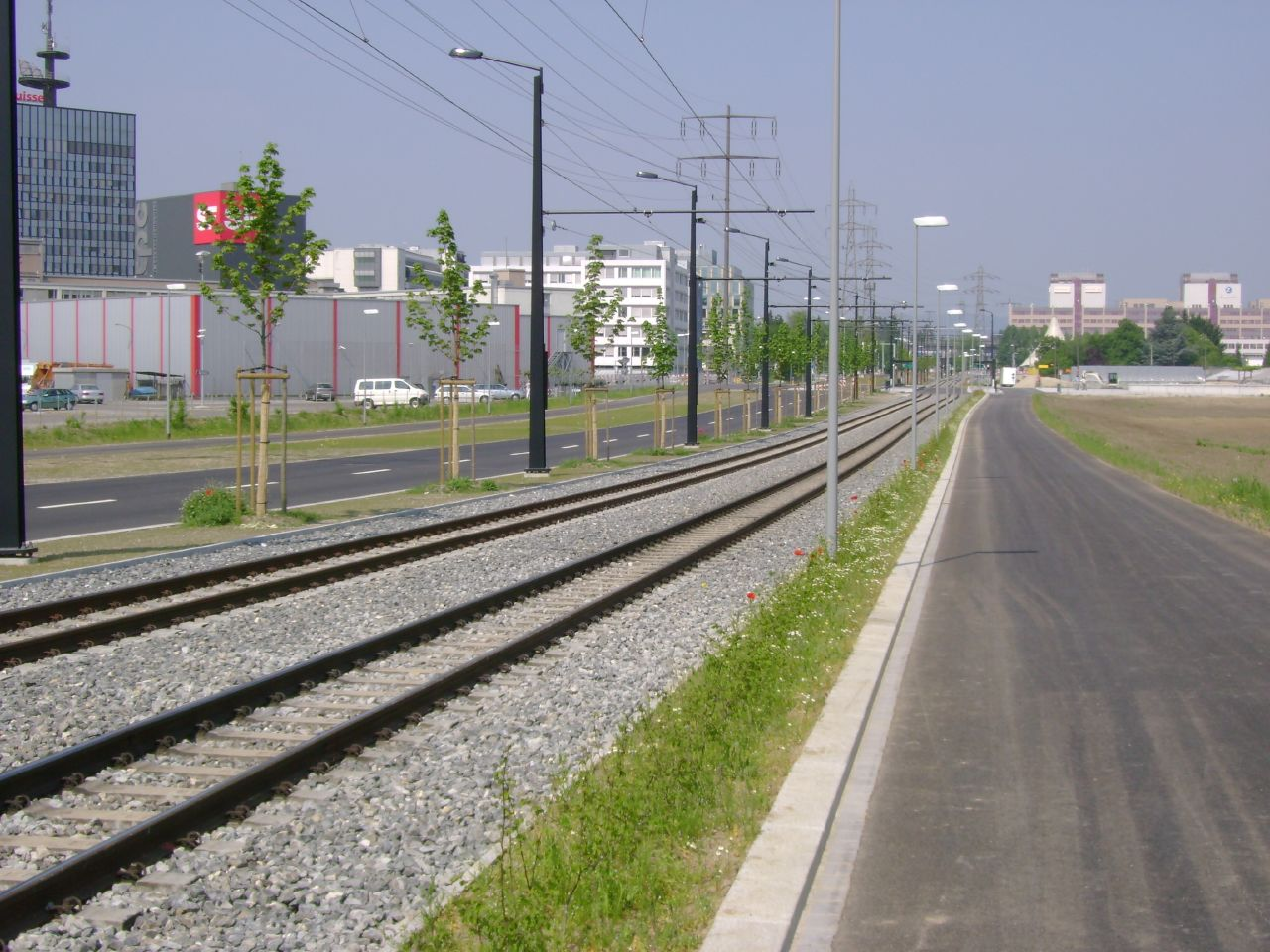
A stretch of ballasted Stadtbahn track

The Glattalbahn, originally known as the Stadtbahn Glattal, was a project that was ultimately successful in introducing a modern rapid-transit system to the Glattal area of Switzerland, to the north of the city of Zürich. Stadtbahn Glattal was developed as a metre gauge tram system with through-running to Zurich. It was built and is owned by the Verkehrsbetriebe Glattal (VBG), but is operated under contract to them by the Verkehrsbetriebe Zürich (VBZ).

Stadtbahn Glattal is the official denomination of this system. This name is used in all official and legal processes. Elsewhere, the alternative term, Glattalbahn, is frequently substituted. The latter term correctly refers to the railway line from Wallisellen to Uster. It is, however, widely used for the Stadtbahn Glattal system and is prominent on the official website and advertising material.

Stadtbahn Glattal is sometimes described in German as a Mittelverteiler, i.e., intermediate distributor (intermediate between S-Bahn and bus).

== History ==
=== Pre-existing situation ===
A private tramway company, the Strassenbahn Zürich-Oerlikon-Seebach (ZOS), opened a line from Zürich Seebach to Glattbrugg in 1908. At the time, this area was sparsely inhabited and the line was not a commercial success. The link was replaced by a bus service in 1931.

In the period following World War II, the Glattal area experienced a rapid boom as population and industry spilled over from nearby Zürich. The development was accelerated by the inauguration of Zurich Airport near Kloten in 1953. The economic growth of the Glattal region is continuing to this day. One of the consequences of the rapid transformation is rising traffic congestion.

The area was, and still is, served by the Zürich S-Bahn, which provides frequent and fast connections between its stations. There are also fast train connections from Zurich Airport to central Zürich, some calling in Oerlikon. However the stations of the S-Bahn are widely spaced and, prior to the development of the Stadtbahn Glattal, onward distribution from the railway stations depended on bus services.

=== Investigation ===
By the 1990s, it was recognised that the bus services in the Glattal region were suffering from both road congestion and vehicle overloading. It was decided to investigate the construction of a rapid transit system.

Following the evaluation of alternatives, including a monorail system, a metre gauge tram was selected on account of its compatibility with that of neighbouring Zürich and the ability to provide through services.

=== Development ===
The regional bus operating authority for the Glattal area, the VBG, was charged with managing the implementation of the project, and it in turn subcontracted the operation of the rail services to the VBZ.

The system was developed in three phases:

- Phase 1 saw Zürich city trams extended from Messe to Auzelg. Construction began in 2004 and this line was inaugurated in late 2006. It is operated as an extension of city route 11.
- Phase 2 branched off from phase 1 and ran to Zurich Flughafen, Bahnhof via Opfikon and Glattbrugg. Construction began in 2006 and the line was opened in December 2008. The route is operated as an extension of city route 10.
- Phase 3 saw the phase 1 line extended from Auzelg via Wallisellen to Bahnhof Stettbach in Dübendorf. Construction began in 2008 for a 2010 opening. Trams now run from Zurich Airport to Bahnhof Stettbach as the new route 12.

The Federal Council approved an extension on April 6, 2022.

== Operation ==
The Stadtbahn Glattal is operated by Verkehrsbetriebe Zürich (VBZ) as an extension to its Zürich tram network. The following routes are operated:

Route	Description (Portion of route in italics is on VBZ owned track)
10	Hauptbahnhof - Sternen Oerlikon - Bhf.Oerlikon Ost - Leutschenbach - Glattpark - Bhf.Glattbrugg - Bhf.Kloten Balsberg - Zurich Flughafen, Bahnhof
11	Bhf. Tiefenbrunnen - Hauptbahnhof - Bhf.Oerlikon - Sternen Oerlikon - Hallenstadion - Leutschenbach - Glattpark - Auzelg
12	Zurich Flughafen, Bahnhof - Bhf.Kloten Balsberg - Bhf.Glattbrugg - Glattpark - Auzelg - Bhf.Wallisellen - Glattzentrum - Dübendorf - Ringwiesen - Bhf.Stettbach

Routes 10 and 12 are operated by the VBZ on behalf of the VBG, normally using low floor Bombardier Cobra tramcars in the VBG's own predominantly white colour scheme. Route 11 is operated by the VBZ on its own behalf, normally using vehicles in its own livery with journeys alternating between low floor and older high floor vehicles.

From December 2025 until December 2026, line 11 only operates between Tiefenbrunnen and Hauptbahnhof due to construction at the tram stop Bahnhofquai/HB. The section Hauptbahnhof–Auzelg is served by the temporary construction line 50 coming from Frankental.

== Future plans ==
There are several future plans for extension of the system. As a first stage, the route from the airport to the centre and industrial and commercial area of Kloten is to be extended from 2025 onwards, with the terminus in Bassersdorf Grindel. The project includes a bridge over the airport motorway, a main cycle link and the upgrading of the old stream in the centre of Kloten. The further extension plans are as yet uncommitted, although in some cases the proposed alignment has been protected. They include:

- The Ringbahn Hardwald extends the system from the end of the current phase 2 line at Zurich Flughafen, Bahnhof, via Kloten, Bassersdorf, Dietlikon and Dübendorf, to a common terminus with the already built phase 3 line at Stettbach railway station.
- An extension from Dübendorf to Uster.
- An extension to Bülach.
