= Effretikon railway station =

Railway station in Illnau-Effretikon, Switzerland

Effretikon
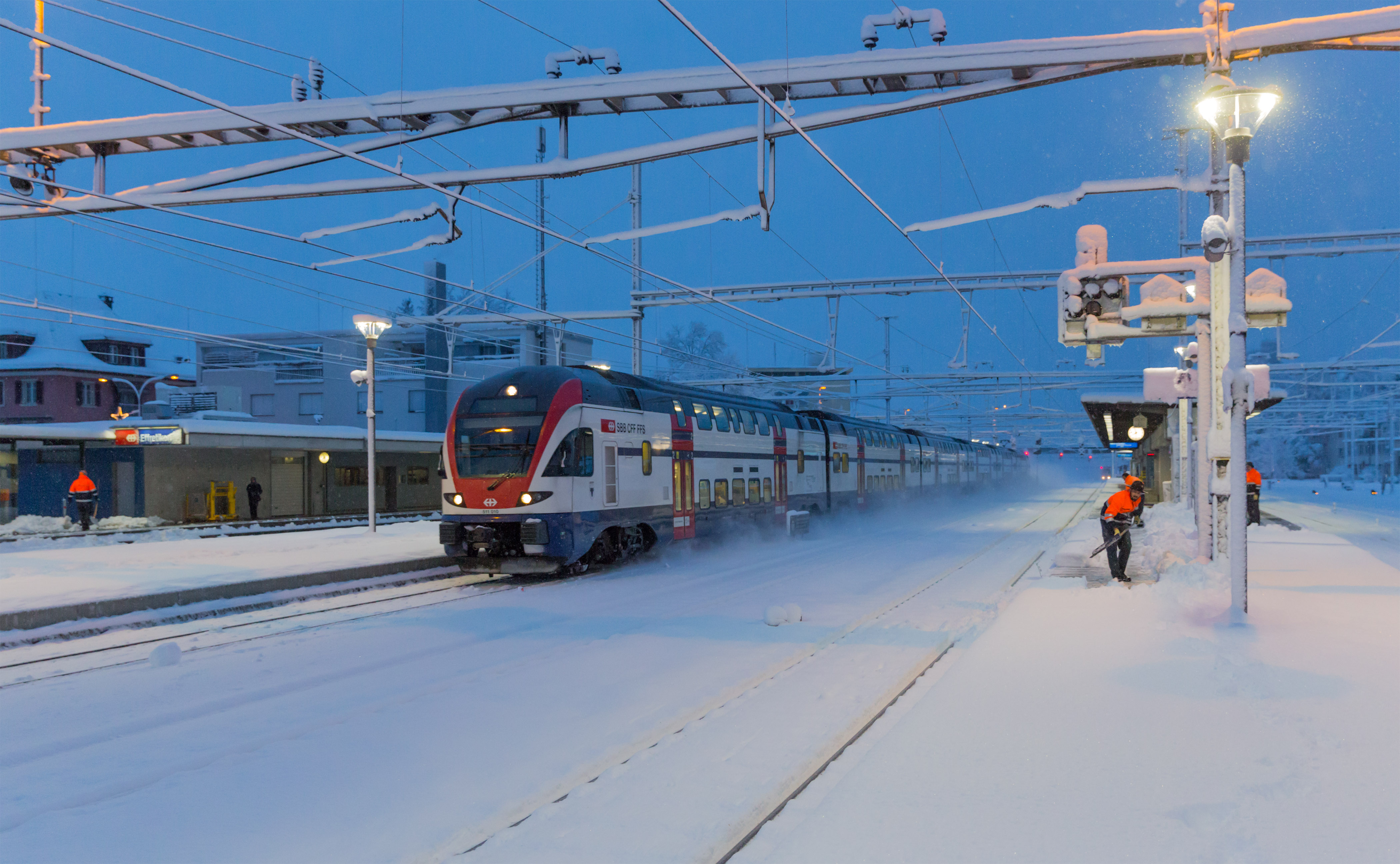
- Effretikon railway station at wintertime

General information
- Location: Bahnhofstrasse; Effretikon, Canton of Zurich; Switzerland
- Coordinates: 47°25′34″N 8°41′13″E
- Elevation: 511 m (1,677 ft)
- Owner: Swiss Federal Railways
- Lines: Zürich–Winterthur railway line; Effretikon–Hinwil railway line
- Platforms: 2 island platforms; 1 side platform
- Tracks: 11
- Train operators: Swiss Federal Railways
- Connections
- Bus: VBG buses 650 652 655 656 657 658 659 662 720

Construction
- Architect: Max Vogt

Other information
- Fare zone: 122 (ZVV)

Passengers
- 2025: 17,400 per day (SBB)
- Rank: 48 out of 1,095

Services
Preceding station	Zurich S-Bahn	Following station
Dietlikon towards Bülach	S3	Illnau towards Wetzikon
Bassersdorf towards Rapperswil	S7	Kemptthal towards Winterthur
Dietlikon towards Pfäffikon SZ	S8	Winterthur Terminus
Dietlikon towards Koblenz	S19	Illnau Peak period only towards Pfäffikon ZH
Bassersdorf towards Zug	S24	Kemptthal towards Thayngen or Weinfelden
Dietlikon towards Aarau	SN1 Limited service	Winterthur Terminus
Dietlikon towards Würenlos	SN6 Limited service	Winterthur Terminus
Dietlikon towards Lachen	SN8 Limited service	Illnau towards Pfäffikon ZH
Dietlikon towards Olten	SN11 Limited service	Winterthur One-way operation
Location
- Location within Switzerland Location within Canton of Zurich

Effretikon is a railway station in the Swiss canton of Zürich and municipality of Illnau-Effretikon. The station, which takes its name from the village of Effretikon, is located on the Zürich to Winterthur main line at the junction with the Effretikon to Hinwil line. It lies within fare zone 122 of the Zürcher Verkehrsverbund (ZVV).

== Service ==
Effretikon is an important junction in the Zurich S-Bahn network. It is an intermediate stop on services S3, S7, S8 and S24. For most of the day it is also the outer terminus of S-Bahn service S19, although in peak periods some trains continue to Pfäffikon ZH. On weekends (Friday and Saturday nights), there are four nighttime S-Bahn services (SN1, SN6, SN8, SN11) offered by ZVV.

Summary of all S-Bahn services:

- Zurich S-Bahn:
  - S3: half-hourly service to Hardbrücke (or Bülach during peak hour) via Zürich Stadelhofen, and to Wetzikon.
  - S7: half-hourly service to Rapperswil via Kloten and Zürich HB, and to Winterthur.
  - S8: half-hourly service to Pfäffikon SZ via Zürich Oerlikon and Thalwil, and to Winterthur.
  - S19: half-hourly service to Dietikon (during peak hours to Koblenz) via Wallisellen and Zürich HB, and during peak hours to Pfäffikon ZH.
  - S24: half-hourly service to Zug via Zürich Flughafen and Zürich HB, and hourly service to Thayngen or Weinfelden (both via Winterthur).
  - Nighttime S-Bahn (only during weekends):
    - SN1: hourly service to Aarau via Zürich HB, and to Winterthur.
    - SN6: hourly service to Würenlos via Zürich HB, and to Winterthur.
    - SN8: hourly service to Lachen via Zürich HB, and to Pfäffikon ZH.
    - SN11: hourly service to Olten via Zürich HB.

Verkehrsbetriebe Glattal (VBG) buses serve Effretikon railway station at a dedicated bus station, located immediately south of the station building.

Summary of bus services:

- 650: Effretikon – Tagelswangen – Lindau – Winterberg ZH
- 652: Effretikon – Illnau (station) – Weisslingen – Neschwil
- 655: Effretikon – Grafstal – Kyburg
- 656: Effretikon – Kleinikon – Breite bei Nürensdorf
- 657: Effretikon – Grafstal – Winterberg ZH
- 658/659: Effretikon – Tagelswangen – Nürensdorf – Bretie bei Nürensdorf
- 662: Effretikon – Kleinikon – Brütten (stops only in peak direction)
- 720: Effretikon – Volketswil – Schwerzenbach (station)

== See also ==
- Rail transport in Switzerland
