= Stettbach railway station =

Railway station on the north-eastern boundary of the Swiss city of Zürich

Stettbach
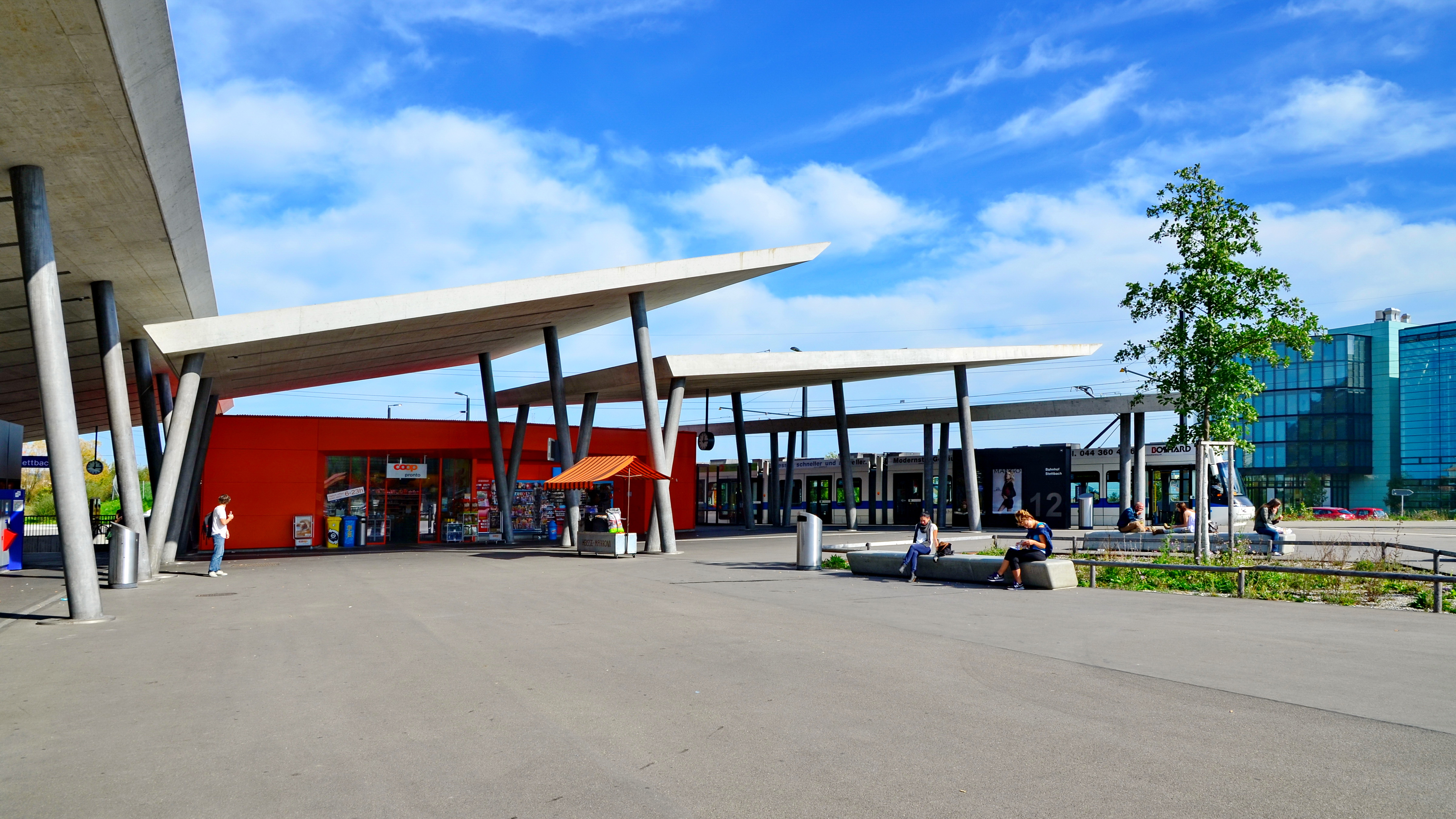
- The above ground access to Stettbach station, with tram terminus in background

General information
- Location: Dübendorfstrasse; Zurich; Switzerland
- Coordinates: 47°23′50″N 8°35′46″E
- Elevation: 440 m (1,440 ft)
- Owner: Swiss Federal Railways
- Line: Zürichberg railway line
- Platforms: 1
- Tracks: 2
- Train operators: Swiss Federal Railways
- Connections: ZVV
- Tram: VBZ/Glattalbahn 7 12
- Bus: Glattalbus (VBG) buses 743 744 745 751 752 754 760
- Airport: VBZ/Glattalbahn tram 12 to/from Zurich Airport in 0:27h

Other information
- Fare zone: 110 and 121 (ZVV)

Passengers
- 2025: 25,200 per day (SBB)
- Rank: 31 out of 1,095

Services
Preceding station	Zurich S-Bahn	Following station
Zürich Stadelhofen towards Bülach	S3	Dietlikon towards Wetzikon
Zürich Stadelhofen towards Schaffhausen	S9	Dübendorf towards Uster
Zürich Stadelhofen towards Aarau	S11	Winterthur towards Seuzach or Wila
Zürich Stadelhofen towards Brugg AG	S12	Winterthur towards Schaffhausen or Wil
Zürich Stadelhofen towards Aarau	SN1 Limited service	Dietlikon towards Winterthur
Zürich Stadelhofen towards Würenlos	SN6 Limited service	Dietlikon towards Winterthur
Zürich Stadelhofen towards Bülach	SN9 Limited service	Dübendorf towards Uster
Zürich Stadelhofen towards Olten	SN11 Limited service	Dietlikon One-way operation
Location

Stettbach railway station (German: Bahnhof Stettbach) is a railway station on the north-eastern boundary of the Swiss city of Zurich. Although the station is located just within the city boundary, in the city's Schwamendingen district, it takes its name from the nearby village of Stettbach, which is in the adjacent municipality of Dübendorf. It is located on the border between fare zones 110 and 121 of the ZVV.

== History ==
Stettbach station, along with the Zürichberg Tunnel and the connecting railway on which the station is situated, were opened in 1990. At the same time Zürich Stadelhofen station was connected by the Hirschengraben Tunnel to new through low level platforms at Zürich Hauptbahnhof, thus creating the through west-east backbone of the Zürich S-Bahn. In conjunction with the opening of the Glattalbahn in 2010, the tram and bus station on the surface were rebuilt.

== Operation ==
The station is on the Zürichberg line, which links Zürich Stadelhofen station, in central Zurich, with Dietlikon and Dübendorf stations. The station has a single platform below ground level, served by two tracks, and at the southern end of the station the railway tracks enter the 5 kilometres (3.1 mi) Zürichberg Tunnel to Zürich Stadelhofen.

The station is served by the following lines of the Zurich S-Bahn:

- S3 (Bülach–) Hardbrücke–Zürich HB–Effretikon–Wetzikon
- S9 (Schaffhausen–) Rafz–Hardbrücke–Zürich HB–Uster
- S11 Aarau–Lenzburg–Dietikon–Zürich HB–Zürich Stettbach–Winterthur–Seuzach/Sennhof-Kyburg (–Wila)
- S12 Brugg AG–Zürich HB–Zürich Stettbach– Winterthur–Schaffhausen/Wil SG

All lines are operated by the Swiss Federal Railways (SBB). During weekends, there are also five nighttime S-Bahn service (SN1, SN5, SN6, SN9, SN11) offered by ZVV.

- Nighttime S-Bahn (only during weekends):
  - SN1: hourly service between Winterthur and Aarau (via Zürich HB).
  - SN6: hourly service between Winterthur and Würenlos (via Zürich HB).
  - SN9: hourly service between Bülach and Uster (via Zürich HB).
  - SN11: hourly service to Olten (via Zürich HB).

Adjacent to the station at ground-level are the termini of two of Zurich's tram routes. Route 7 is owned and operated by the Verkehrsbetriebe Zürich (VBZ) and links Stettbach to central Zürich via the Schwamendingen district. Route 12 is operated by VBZ on behalf of the Glattalbahn (VBG), and links Stettbach to Zurich Airport, via Wallisellen and Glattbrugg in the increasingly urbanised Glattal region. Several bus routes also depart from the ground-level station.

== Future plans ==
Zürich Zoo, situated on the Zürichberg mountain above the tunnel, has plans to construct a cable car to link the zoo and station, a distance of about 2 km (1.2 mi). As of 2023, the cable car is expected to open in 2028.

== Gallery ==
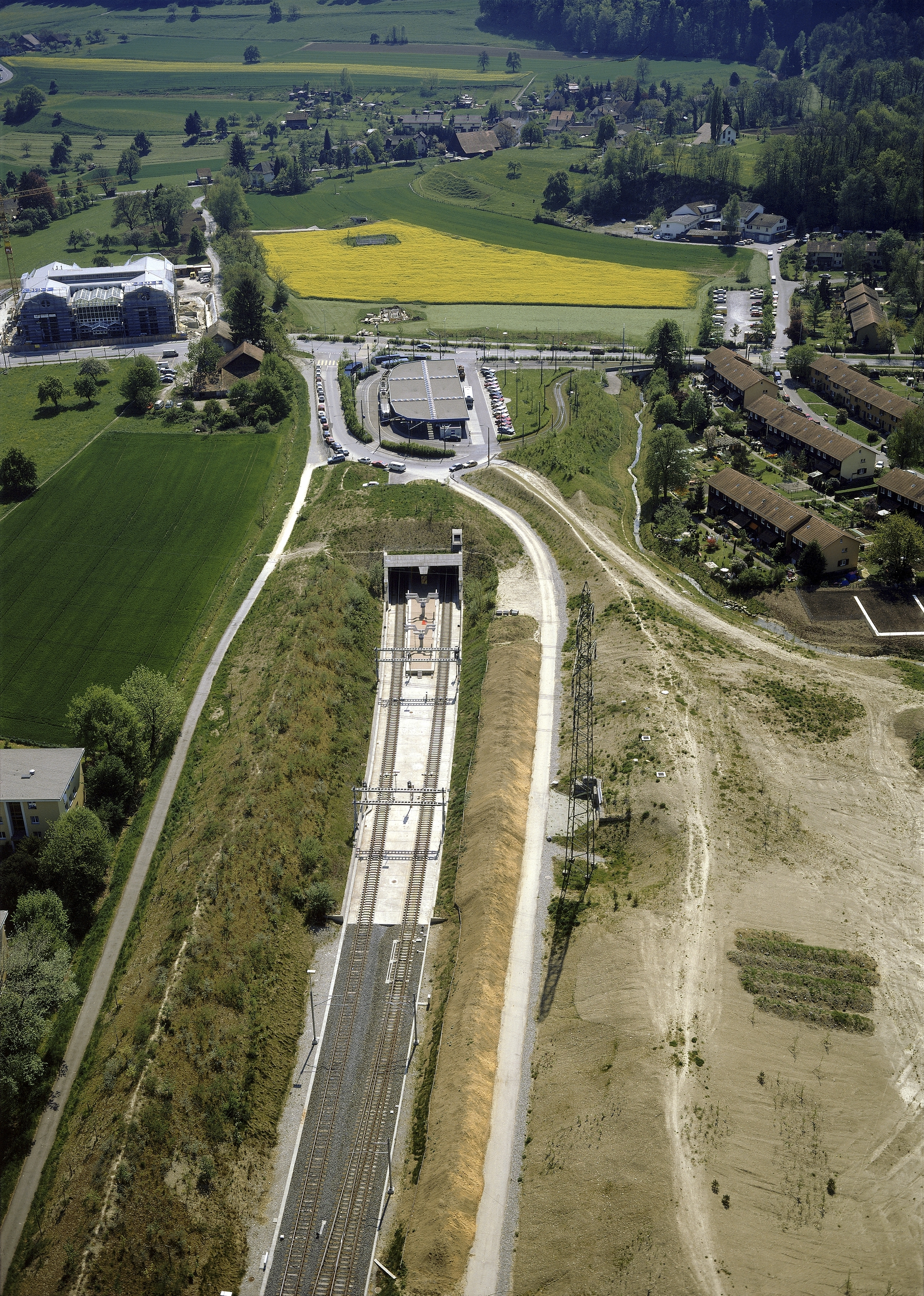
Aerial view of the station in 1990, looking towards South.

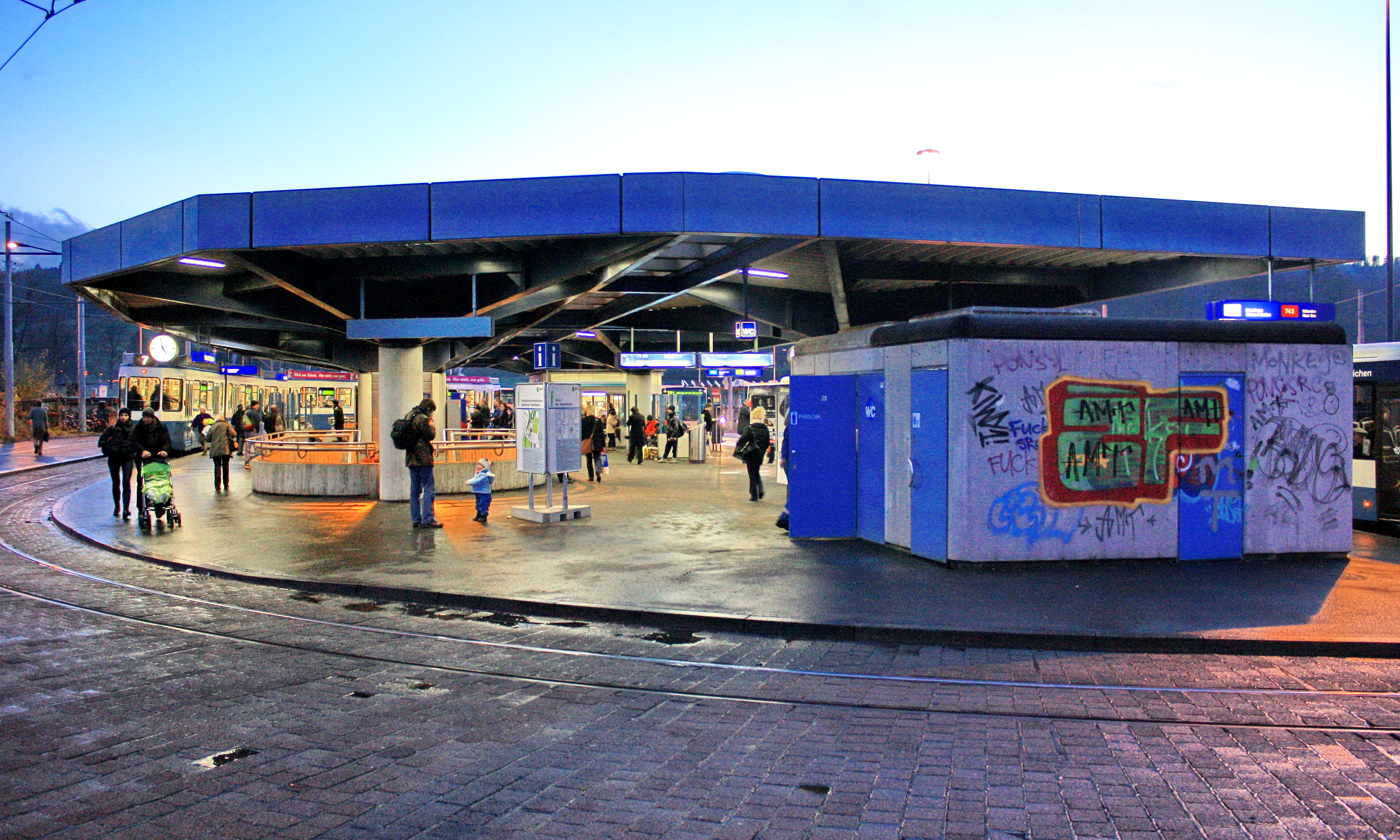
Surface tram and bus station (2009) before it was rebuilt in 2010.

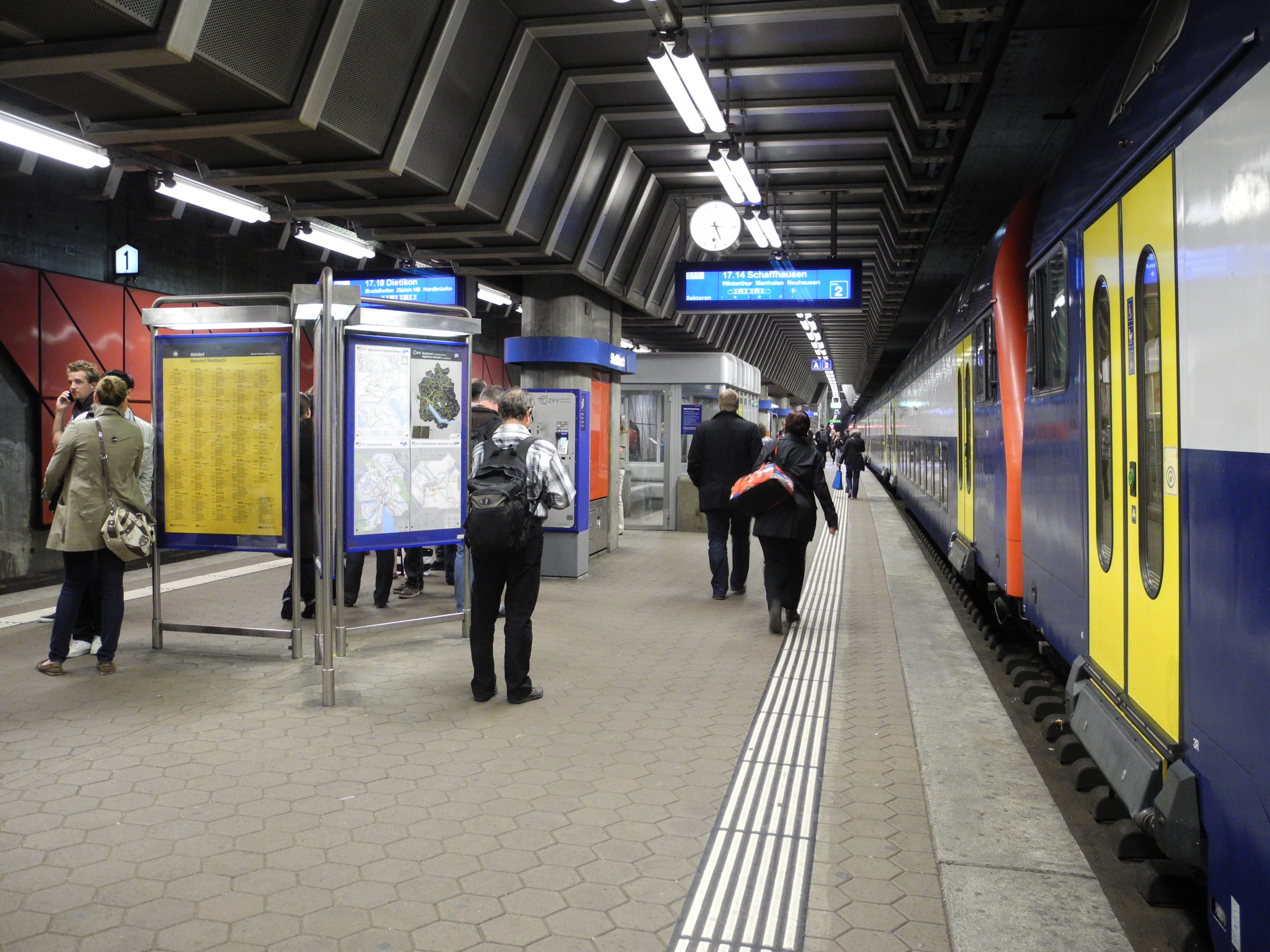
The underground platforms.

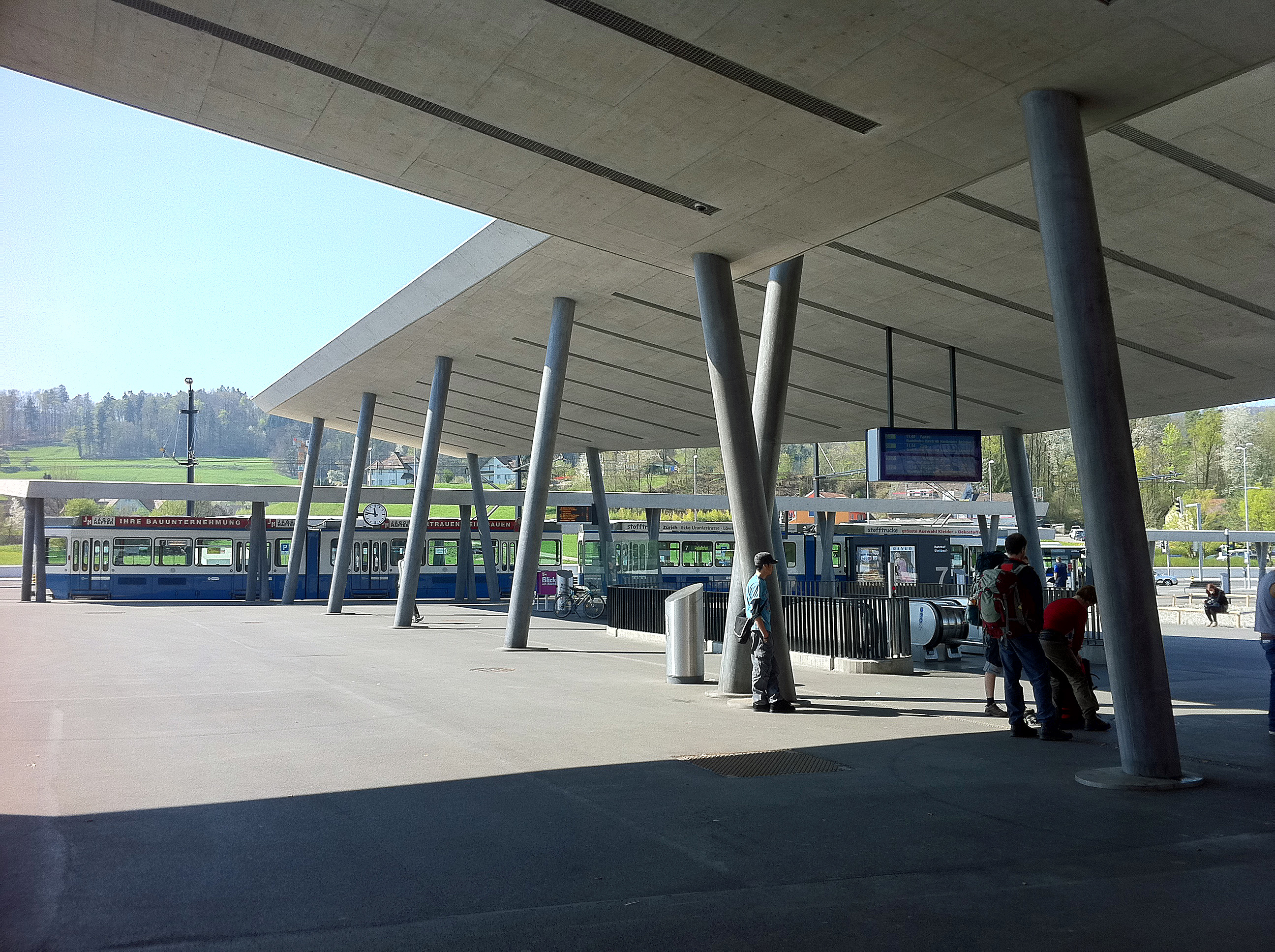
The station at the surface (connection to trams and buses).

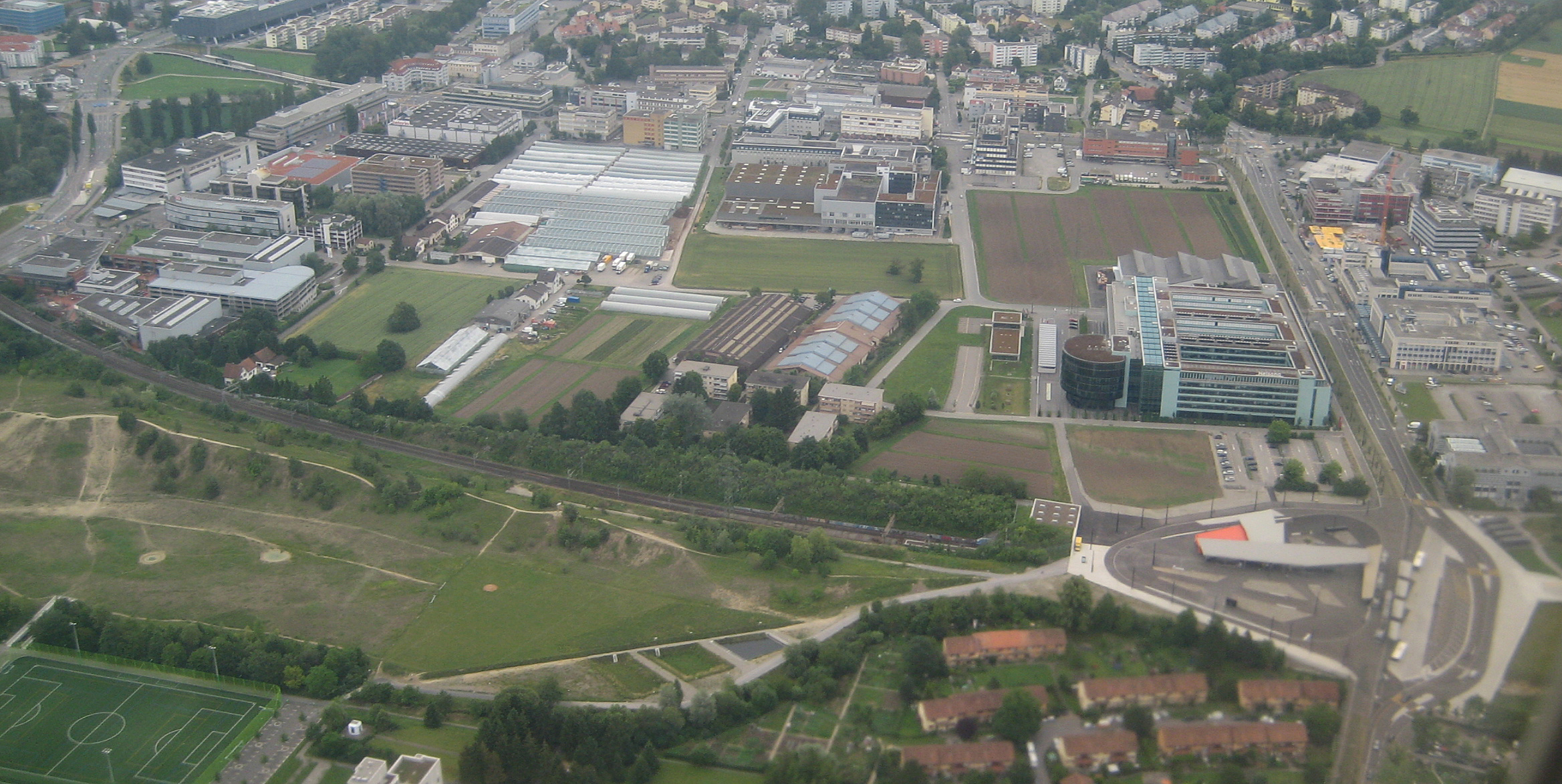
Aerial view of the station, looking towards East.

== See also ==
- List of railway stations in Zurich
- Rail transport in Switzerland
