= Dübendorf railway station =

Railway station in Canton of Zürich, Switzerland

Dübendorf
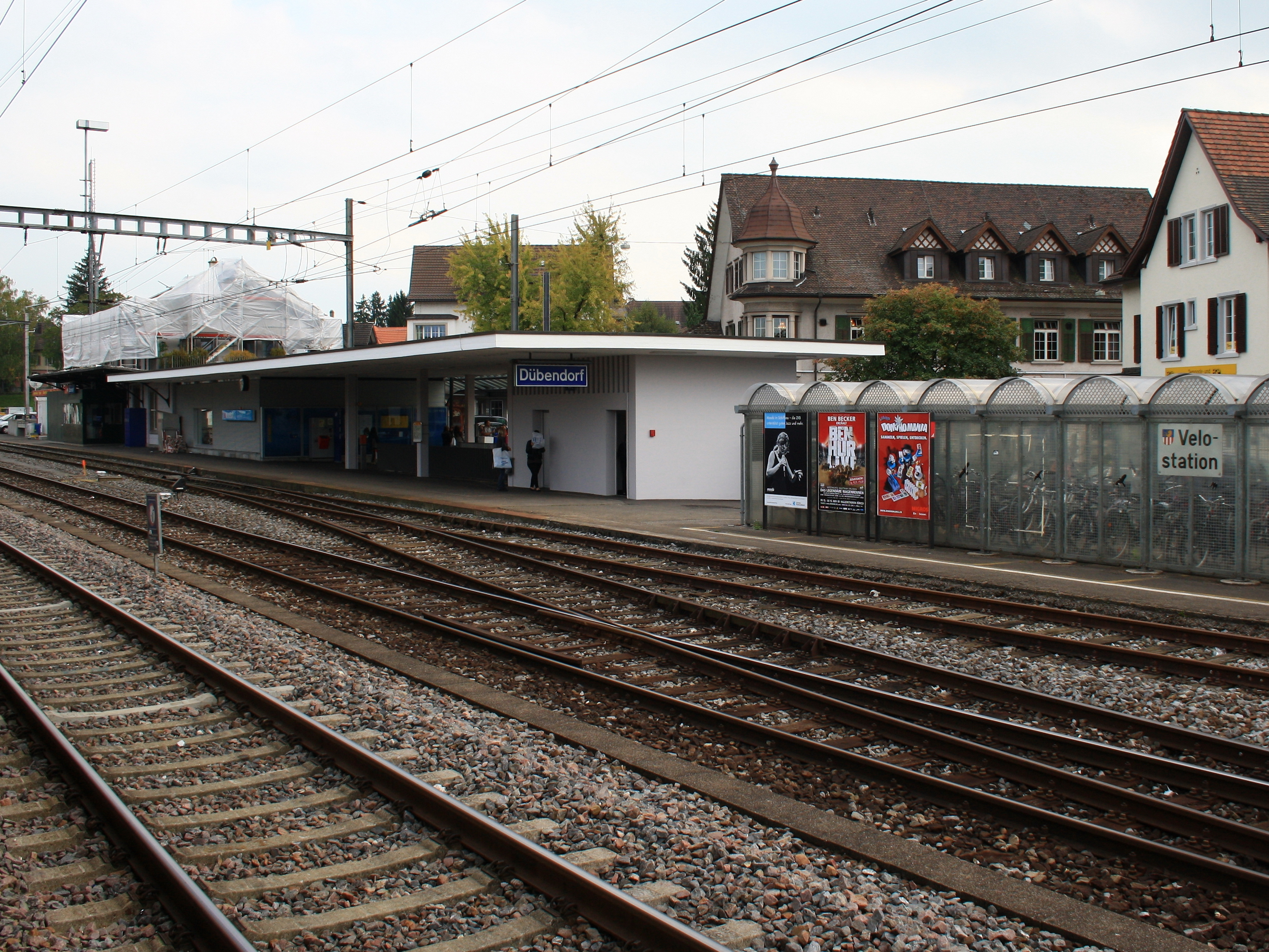

General information
- Location: Bahnhofstrasse; Dübendorf, Zurich; Switzerland
- Coordinates: 47.39998°N 8.622943°E
- Elevation: 440 m (1,440 ft)
- Owner: Swiss Federal Railways
- Operator: Swiss Federal Railways
- Line: Wallisellen–Uster–Rapperswil
- Platforms: 1 island platform

Other information
- Fare zone: 121 (ZVV)

Services
Preceding station	Zurich S-Bahn	Following station
Stettbach towards Schaffhausen	S9	Schwerzenbach towards Uster
Wallisellen towards Affoltern am Albis	S14	Schwerzenbach towards Hinwil
Stettbach towards Bülach	SN9 Limited service	Schwerzenbach towards Uster
Location
- Location within Switzerland Location within Canton of Zürich

Dübendorf is a railway station in the Swiss canton of Zurich. It is situated in the municipality of Dübendorf on the Wallisellen–Uster–Rapperswil line. It lies within fare zone 121 of the Zürcher Verkehrsverbund (ZVV) and is served by S-Bahn trains only.

The station is located close to the Dübendorf Air Base.

== Service ==
The station is located in the northern part of the town of Dübendorf, and was inaugurated in 1856 with the opening of the Wallisellen - Uster section of the Wallisellen - Rapperswil line. It has two platforms, one lateral and one central, through which pass three tracks, to which must be added another through track, totaling four through tracks in the station. Dübendorf station is served by Zurich S-Bahn lines S9 and S14. During weekends, there is also a nighttime S-Bahn service (SN9) offered by ZVV. Rail services are as follows:

- Zurich S-Bahn:
  - S9: half-hourly service between Uster and Rafz/Schaffhausen via Stadelhofen and Zürich HB.
  - S14: half-hourly service to Affoltern am Albis via Wallisellen and Zürich HB, and to Hinwil via Wetzikon.
  - Nighttime S-Bahn (only during weekends):
    - SN9: hourly service between Bülach and Uster (via Zürich HB).

== See also ==
- Rail transport in Switzerland
