= Opfikon railway station =

Railway station in Switzerland

Opfikon
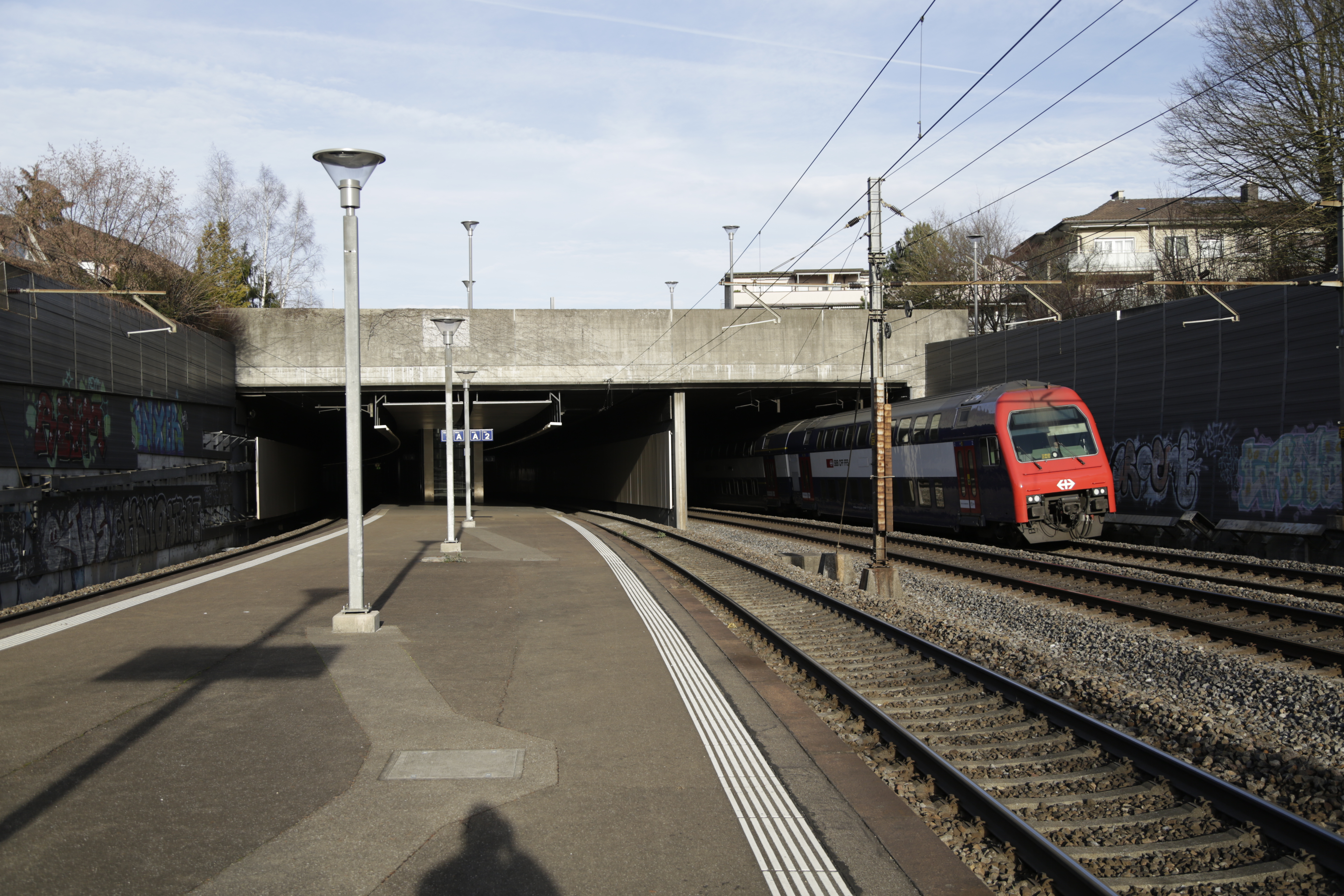
- The station platforms in 2015

General information
- Location: Giebeleichstrasse; Opfikon; Switzerland
- Coordinates: 47°25′48″N 8°33′42″E
- Elevation: 427 m (1,401 ft)
- Owner: Swiss Federal Railways
- Line: Wettingen–Effretikon line
- Platforms: 1 island platform
- Tracks: 2
- Train operators: Swiss Federal Railways
- Connections: ZVV: Opfikon, Bahnhof / Glattbrugg, Post
- Bus: VBG 761 768
- Airport: VBG bus 768 in 0:18h to/from Zurich Airport

Other information
- Fare zone: 121 (ZVV)

Services
Preceding station	Zurich S-Bahn	Following station
Zürich Oerlikon towards Rapperswil	S7	Kloten Balsberg towards Winterthur
Zürich Oerlikon towards Stäfa	SN7 Limited service	Kloten Balsberg towards Bassersdorf
Location
- Location within Switzerland Location within Canton of Zürich

Opfikon is a railway station in Switzerland, in the municipality of Opfikon. The station is served by Zurich S-Bahn line S7. Opfikon station is some 250 metres (820 ft) walk from Glattbrugg station on S-Bahn lines S3, S9 and S15, and the Stadtbahn Glattal. It lies within fare zone 121 of the Zürcher Verkehrsverbund (ZVV).

The station is situated on the Wettingen–Effretikon line, originally opened by the Swiss National Railway (Schweizerische Nationalbahn; SNB) in 1877 and bypassing the city of Zurich. However the passenger trains that stop at the station all operate from Zurich Main Station, using a connection from Zürich Oerlikon station opened in 1881. The station area was heavily modified in 1978, when the airport branch and its through tracks were added.

== Layout ==
Opfikon station has a single central platform, which is flanked by two tracks. The two through tracks of the Zurich Airport station branch of the Zurich to Winterthur line run parallel to the platform, but are not connected to the platform tracks in the vicinity of the station, and trains to/from Zurich Airport therefore passing by. The station is, however, connected to the airport via a bus route.

== Services ==
The following services stop at Opfikon:

- Zurich S-Bahn:
  - S7 Winterthur–Kloten–Hardbrücke–Zürich HB–Meilen–Rapperswil
    Operates non stop between Stadelhofen and Meilen, Winterthur and Effretikon, stops in Kemptthal as of 9:20 PM.

During weekends, there is also a nighttime S-Bahn service calling at Opfikon station, offered by ZVV:

- SN7: hourly service between Bassersdorf and Stäfa via Zürich HB.

== Modernization and expansion ==
In November 2024, Swiss Federal Railways (SBB) began extensive construction to upgrade the rail line between Opfikon Riet and Kloten to a double-track system, alongside a comprehensive modernization of Opfikon station. The project aims to improve operational reliability in the Glattal region, enable a future quarter-hourly service frequency, and ensure barrier-free, level boarding access for passengers in compliance with the Swiss Disability Discrimination Act (BehiG). The construction involves widening local bridges, installing larger elevator facilities at Schaffhauserstrasse, and expanding the pedestrian staircases.

Between 23 May and 29 June 2026, a major five-week full closure of the line required significant service diversions. During this period, regional S7 and SN7 train services completely bypassed Opfikon station. Passengers were rerouted via temporary replacement bus services operating from the nearby Glattbrugg Post stop, or advised to detour using S9 and S15 train services through Glattbrugg station. Further construction impacts and service adjustments on regional lines are scheduled to continue into July 2026.

== See also ==
- Rail transport in Switzerland
