= Kloten Balsberg railway station =

Railway station in Switzerland

Kloten Balsberg
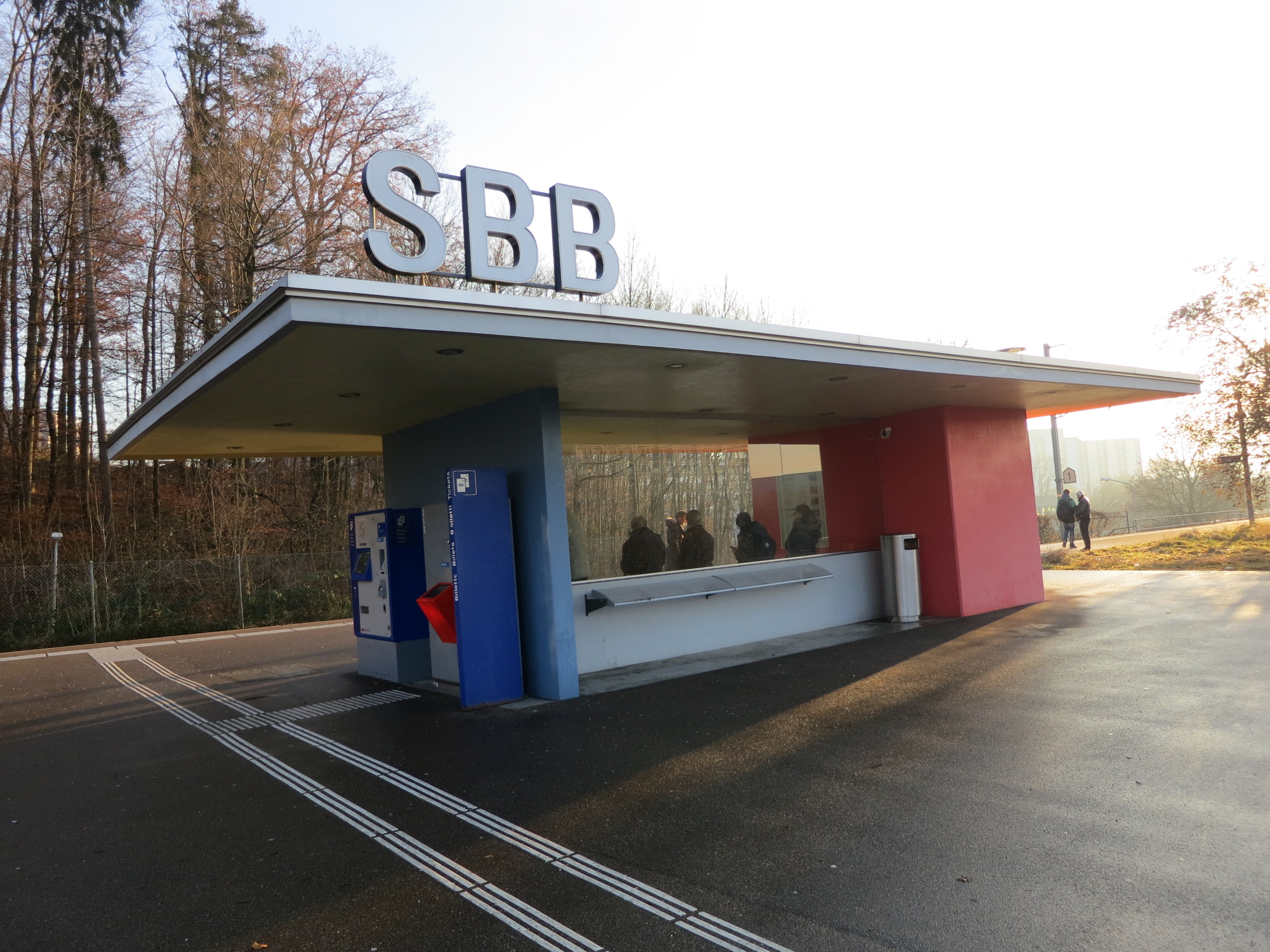
- Shelter at the station in 2013

General information
- Location: Kloten Balsberg, Kloten ZH, Switzerland
- Coordinates: 47.441985°N 8.570763°E
- Elevation: 440 m (1,440 ft)
- Owner: Swiss Federal Railways
- Operator: Swiss Federal Railways
- Line: Zurich–Winterthur
- Platforms: 1 Side platform
- Tracks: 2
- Connections
- Tram: VBZ / VBG 10 12
- Bus: PostAuto 510
- Airport: Zurich trams 10 / 12 in 0:02h to/from Zurich Airport

Other information
- Fare zone: 121 (ZVV)

Services
Preceding station	Zurich S-Bahn	Following station
Opfikon towards Rapperswil	S7	Kloten towards Winterthur
Opfikon towards Stäfa	SN7 Limited service	Kloten towards Bassersdorf
Location
- Location within Switzerland Location within Canton of Zürich

Kloten Balsberg is a railway station in the municipality of Kloten, in the Swiss canton of Zurich. It lies within fare zone 121 of the Zürcher Verkehrsverbund (ZVV). The station is located on a variant of the multi-stranded Zurich–Winterthur railway line and is served by S-Bahn line S7. It is an interchange point between the Zurich S-Bahn and the Stadtbahn Glattal light rail system.

The station was originally situated on the Wettingen–Effretikon line of the Swiss National Railway (Schweizerische Nationalbahn; SNB), which opened in 1877. This SNB became bankrupt in 1878. The line was then taken over by the Swiss Northeastern Railway (Schweizerische Nordostbahn; NOB), becoming part of their Zurich–Winterthur line. It has been part of the network of the Swiss Federal Railways (SBB) since 1902. Although the station is situated only 1 kilometre (0.62 mi) from the main terminal of Zurich Airport, it was bypassed by the opening, in 1980, of a new line directly serving the Zurich Airport railway station in the basement of that terminal. Since 2008, the Stadtbahn Glattal has provided a new direct route to the airport.

== Layout ==
The railway station has a single side platform and one railway track. There is no station building but a shelter. It is directly linked to the adjacent tram stop of the Glattalbahn light rail by an elevated walkway.

== Services ==
=== S-Bahn ===
The station is only served by S-Bahn trains. Line S7 of the Zurich S-Bahn runs every half-hour throughout the day, with services extending to Winterthur in one direction, and to Rapperswil, via Zurich, in the other direction.

- S7 Winterthur–Kloten–Hardbrücke–Zürich HB–Meilen–Rapperswil
  Operates non stop between Stadelhofen and Meilen, Winterthur and Effretikon, stops in Kemptthal as of 9:20 PM.

During weekends, there is also a nighttime S-Bahn service calling at the station, offered by ZVV: Journey time to Zürich Hauptbahnhof is 15 minutes

- SN7: hourly service between Bassersdorf and Stäfa via Zürich HB

=== Tram / Bus ===
The tram stop, which is named Bahnhof Balsberg, adjacent to the station and connected directly to the station platform by an elevated walkway, is served by Zurich tram routes 10 and 12, operated by VBZ/VBG on behalf of the Stadtbahn Glattal.

Tram route 10 runs between four and eight times per hour, depending on the time of day, with services extending to Zurich Airport in one direction, and to Zurich in the other direction. Tram route 12 runs four times per hour, with services extending to the airport in one direction, and to Stettbach in the other direction. Journey time to Zürich Hauptbahnhof is 33 minutes. The routes are summarized below (only selected stops):

Line 10: (Löwenplatz (Note: Only boarding as this stop lies on the turning loop of the line. Bahnhofplatz/HB is the terminus in the opposite direction) –) Bahnhofplatz/HB – Central – ETH/Universitätsspital – Seilbahn Rigiblick – Milchbuck – Sternen Oerlikon – Bhf. Oerlikon Ost – Glattpark – Bhf. Glattbrugg – Bhf. Balsberg – Zurich Airport (Zurich)

Line 12: Stettbach – Glatt – Bhf. Wallisellen – Glattpark – Bhf. Glattbrugg – Bhf. Balsberg – Zurich Airport (Zurich)

The station is also served by PostAuto bus route 510, which departs from a bus stop below the elevated tram stop.

== Gallery ==
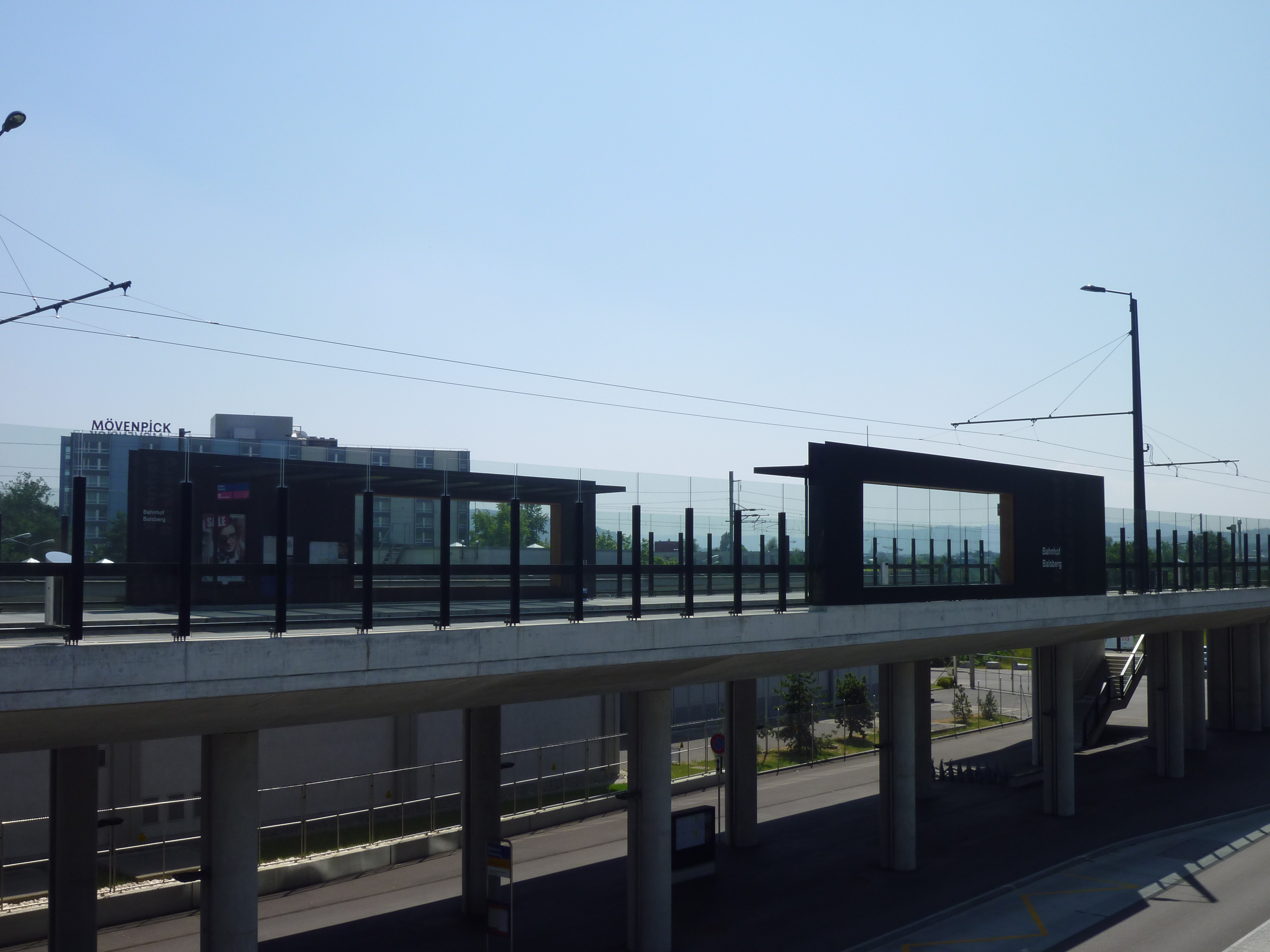
The adjacent elevated tram stop

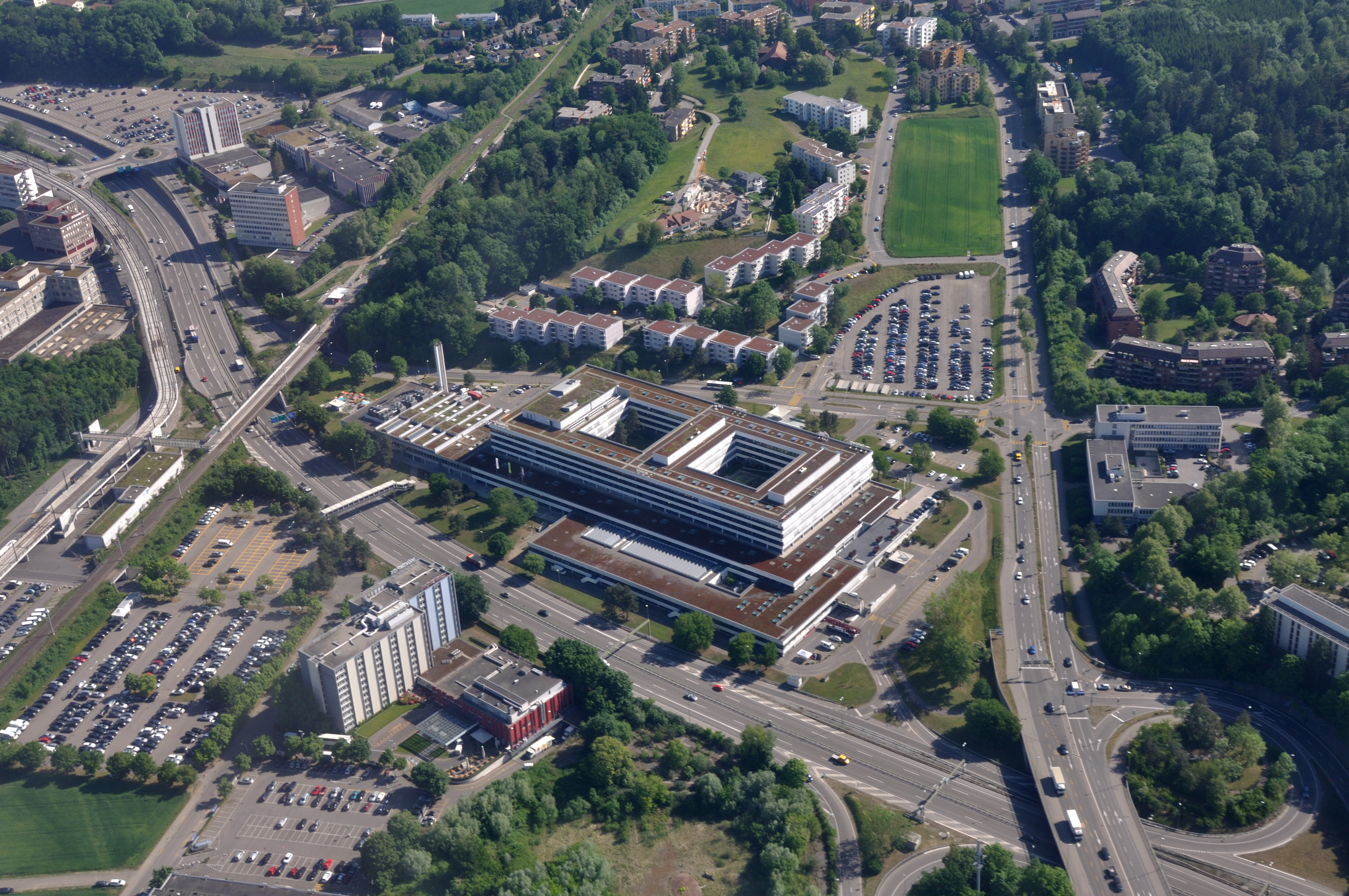
Aerial view of Kloten Balsberg station (to the left, in 2011) from the south; the railway platform crosses the bridge over the road, whilst the tram platforms are to the left and linked by footbridge

An aerial view from the north in 1960. The station is on the left

== See also ==
- Rail transport in Switzerland
