= Parkbahn (Zurich Airport) =

Funicular at Zurich Airport, Switzerland

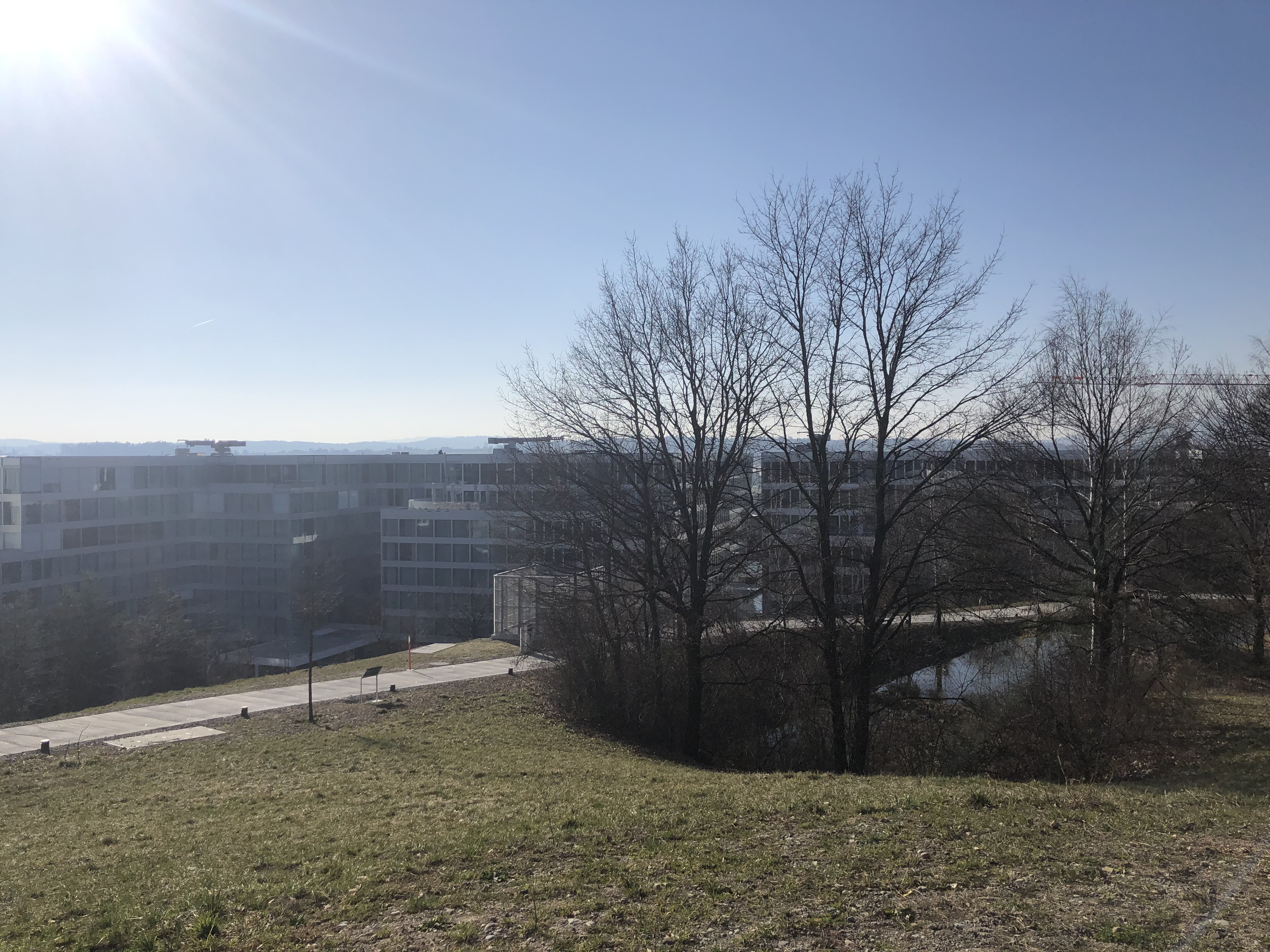
- The Circle park with pond, behind trees: upper station (2021)

Overview
- Other name(s): Standseilbahn Butzenbüel; Flughafen Zürich Standseilbahn Circle; Funicular Zurich Airport Circle
- Status: In operation
- Locale: Kloten, Canton of Zürich, Switzerland
- Termini: Parkbahn Talstation; Parkbahn Station oben
- Stations: 2
- Website: flughafen-zuerich.ch

Service
- Type: Funicular
- Operator(s): Flughafen Zürich AG
- Rolling stock: 1 for 15 passengers

History
- Opened: 5 November 2020

Technical
- Line length: 78.7 m (258 ft)
- Number of tracks: 1
- Maximum incline: 30%

Parkbahn (also Standseilbahn Butzenbüel) is a funicular at Zurich Airport in Switzerland. The line leads from "The Circle" buildings to the center of the park atop Butzenbüel. It is part of a landscaping project of the glacial moraine and planted forest. The single-car line has a length of 79 m with a maximum incline of 30% and a difference of elevation of 23 m. It is fully automated and monitored remotely from the airport's Skymetro operation center.

The installation is open to the public since November 2020.
