= Kemptthal railway station =

Railway station in Lindau, Switzerland

Kemptthal
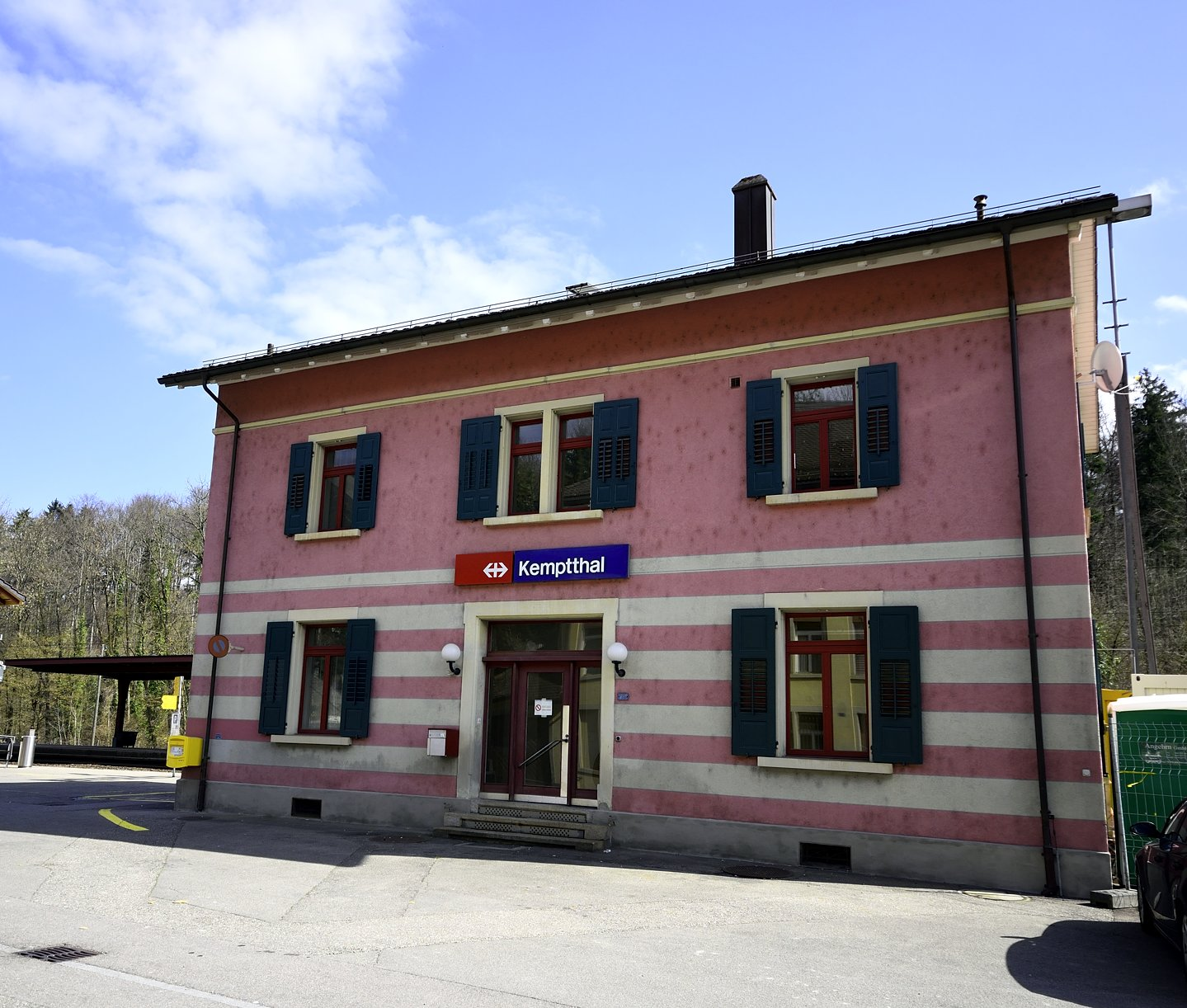
- The station building in 2014

General information
- Location: Lindau, Zürich; Switzerland
- Coordinates: 47°27′06″N 8°42′17″E
- Elevation: 469 m (1,539 ft)
- Owner: Swiss Federal Railways
- Line: Zurich–Winterthur line
- Distance: 20.5 km (12.7 mi) from Zürich Hauptbahnhof
- Platforms: 1 island platform
- Tracks: 3
- Train operators: Swiss Federal Railways

Other information
- Fare zone: 122 (ZVV)

Passengers
- 2018: 750 per weekday

Services
Preceding station	Zurich S-Bahn	Following station
Effretikon towards Rapperswil	S7	Winterthur Terminus
Effretikon towards Zug	S24	Winterthur towards Thayngen or Weinfelden
Location
- Location within Switzerland Location within Canton of Zurich

Kemptthal railway station is a railway station in the municipality of Lindau in the canton of Zurich, Switzerland. The station is located on the Zurich to Winterthur main line, within fare zone 122 of the Zürcher Verkehrsverbund (ZVV). The station's name refers to the Kempt Valley (of River Kempt).

== Services ==
The station is an intermediate stop on Zurich S-Bahn service S7 and S24. The S24 service calls at Kemptthal station until 9:20 pm; after that, the S7 serves the station. Long-distance trains and nighttime S-Bahn services do not call at the station.

As of the December 2021 timetable change, the following services stop at Kemptthal:

- Zurich S-Bahn
  - S7: half-hourly late evening service between Rapperswil and Winterthur
  - S24: half-hourly service to Zug and Winterthur, and hourly service to Thayngen or Weinfelden.

== See also ==
- Rail transport in Switzerland
