= Bassersdorf railway station =

Railway station in the canton of Zürich, Switzerland

Bassersdorf
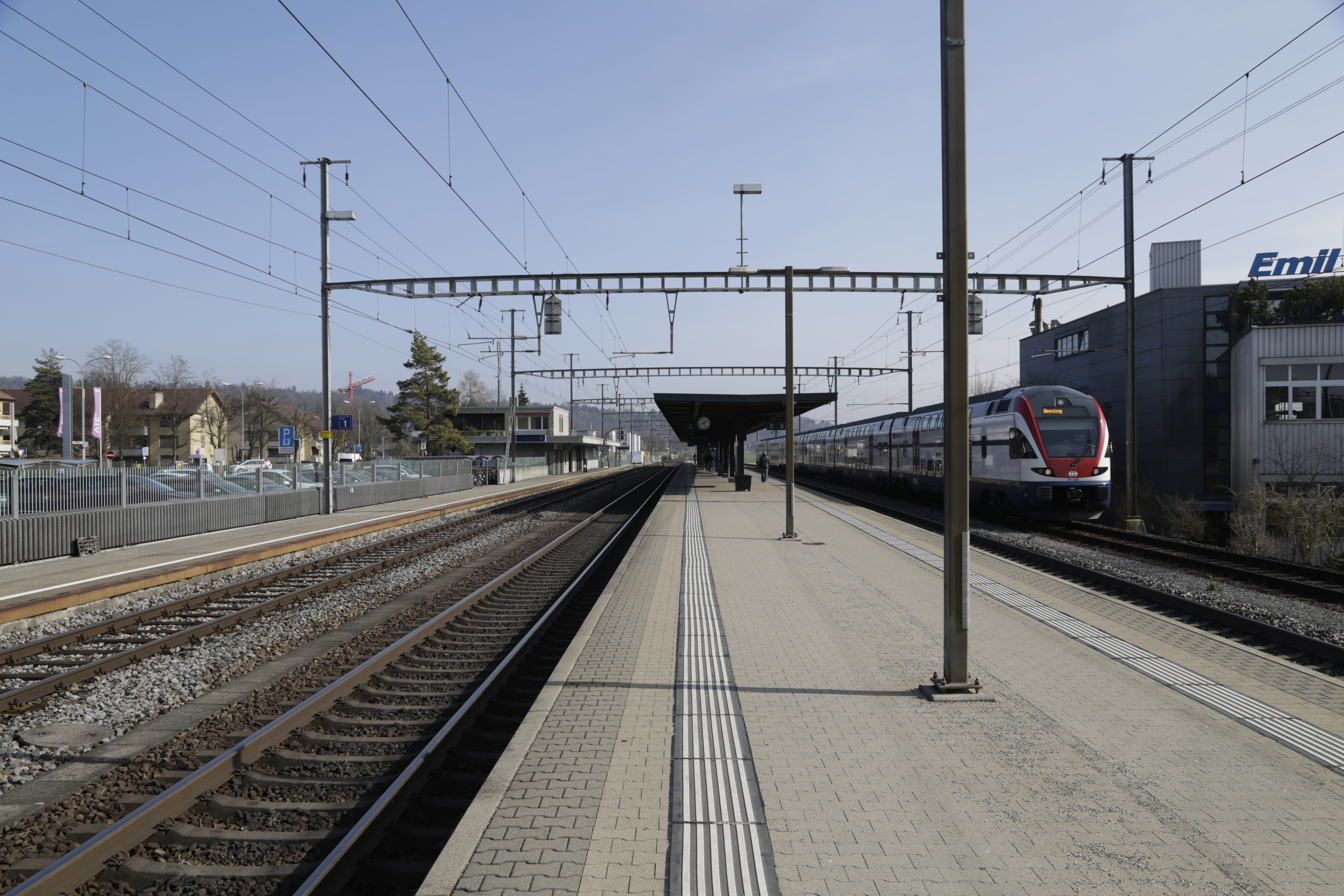

General information
- Location: Bahnhofstrasse; Bassersdorf, Zurich; Switzerland
- Coordinates: 47.438335°N 8.626564°E
- Elevation: 459 m (1,506 ft)
- Owner: Swiss Federal Railways
- Operator: Swiss Federal Railways
- Line: Zurich–Winterthur line (Wettingen–Effretikon)
- Platforms: 2
- Tracks: 3
- Connections: Glattalbus: 765, 766, 769, N78; Stadtbus Winterthur: 660

Other information
- Fare zone: 121 (ZVV)

History
- Opened: 1980 (at present location)

Services
Preceding station	Zurich S-Bahn	Following station
Kloten towards Rapperswil	S7	Effretikon towards Winterthur
Zürich Airport towards Zug	S24	Effretikon towards Thayngen or Weinfelden
Kloten towards Stäfa	SN7 Limited service	Terminus
Location
- Location within Switzerland Location within Canton of Zürich

Bassersdorf is a railway station in the Swiss canton of Zurich and the municipality of Bassersdorf. The station is located on the Zurich to Winterthur main line, to the east of where the Zürich Airport and Kloten lines diverge. It lies within fare zone 121 of the Zürcher Verkehrsverbund (ZVV) and is an intermediate stop on the Zurich S-Bahn services S7 and S24.

The original route of the railway was through the centre of Bassersdorf. But with the construction of a new railway to serve Zurich Airport in 1980, this route was abandoned along with the original Bassersdorf railway station from 1877, built by Schweizerische Nationalbahn. A new station was constructed on the new line, some 500 m (1,600 ft) to the south of the original station.

== Layout ==
Bassersdorf railway station is located on Bahnhofstrasse, 500 metres (1,600 ft) south of the town center. The station consists of a side platform serving track 1 and an island platform for tracks 2 and 3; only the latter is used in scheduled service. A fourth track is not served by a platform. A small station building lies north of the platforms, along with a bus stop and car park. A pedestrian tunnel connects these facilities with the island platform and with Pöschenstrasse on the south side of the tracks.

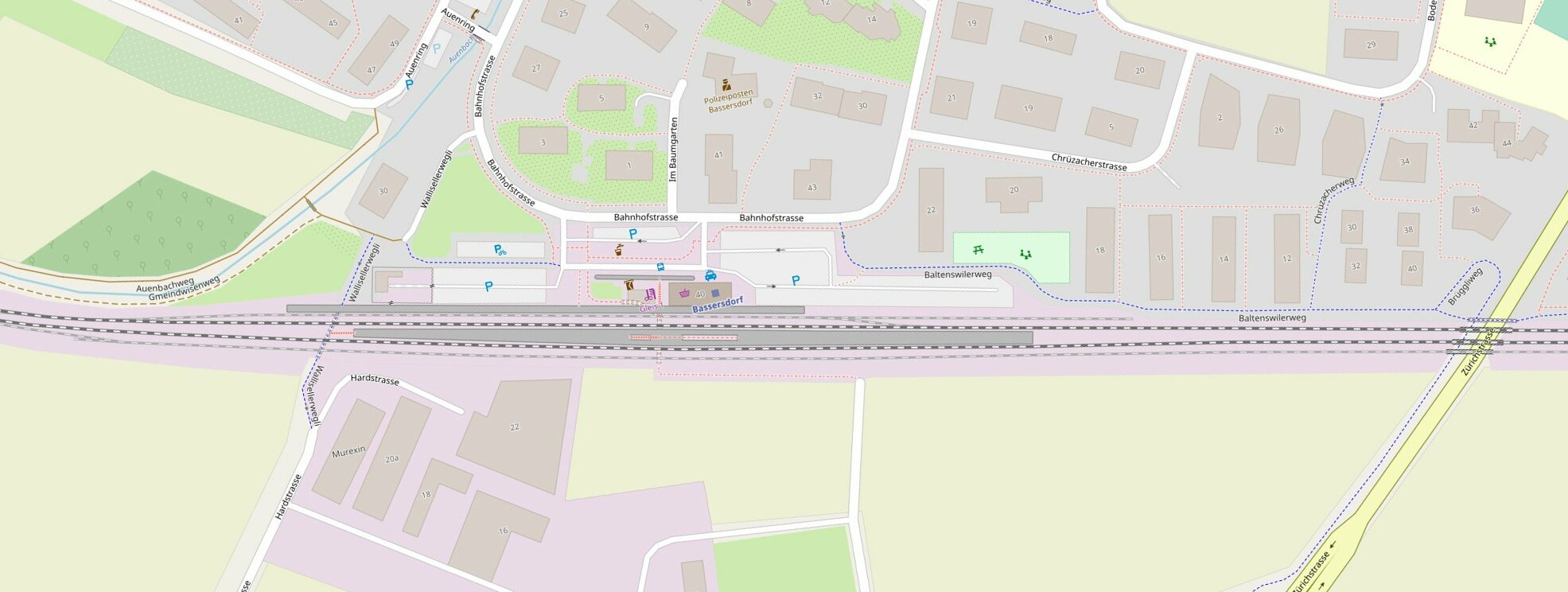
Map of the station

== Services ==
The following Zurich S-Bahn services stop at Bassersdorf:

- S7 Winterthur–Kloten–Hardbrücke–Zürich HB–Meilen–Rapperswil
  Operates non stop between Stadelhofen and Meilen, Winterthur and Effretikon, stops in Kemptthal as of 9:20 PM.
- S24 Thayngen/Weinfelden–Winterthur–Zürich Flughafen –Wipkingen–Zürich HB–Thalwil–Zug
  Services stop in Kemptthal until 9:20 PM; the lines to Thayngen and Weinfelden are operated alternately at hourly intervals; stops between Neuhausen and Winterthur only in Andelfingen.

The S7 and S24 each run at 30-minute intervals; together, they provide 4 trains per hour to Zürich HB and to Winterthur.

During weekends, there is also a nighttime S-Bahn service calling at the station, offered by ZVV:

- SN7 (hourly service): Bassersdorf – Kloten – Zürich Hardbrücke – Zürich HB – Meilen – Stäfa

A few unnumbered S-Bahn trains run between Zurich and Winterthur before normal service begins.

=== Regional bus ===
Four bus routes connect Bassersdorf railway station to nearby stations and communities:

- 660 Bassersdorf — Nürensdorf – Brütten – Winterthur
- 765 Dietlikon – Bassersdorf – Kloten – Zurich Airport
- 766: Bassersdorf – Kloten
- 769 Bassersdorf — Nürensdorf

== Gallery ==
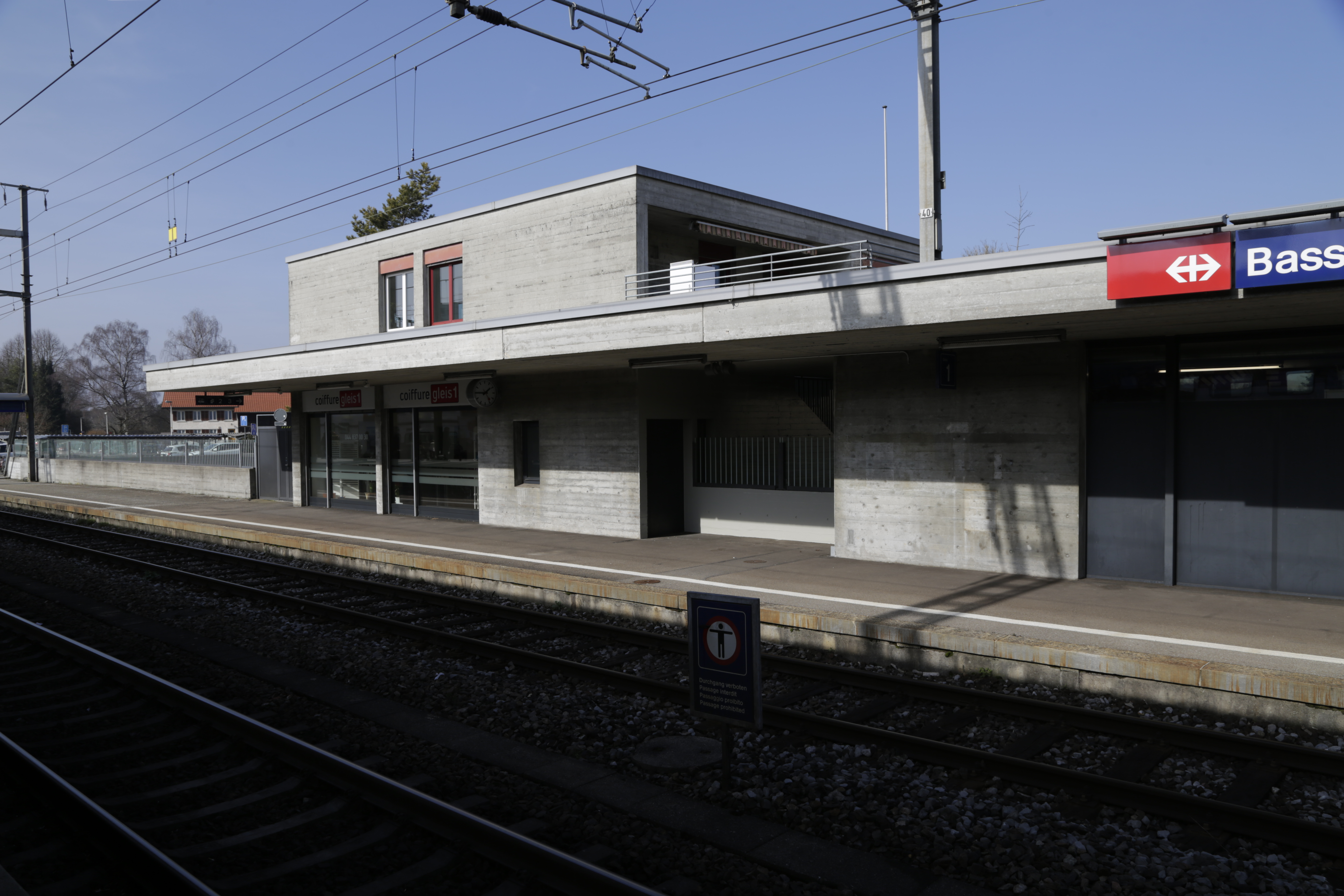
The current station building (2016)

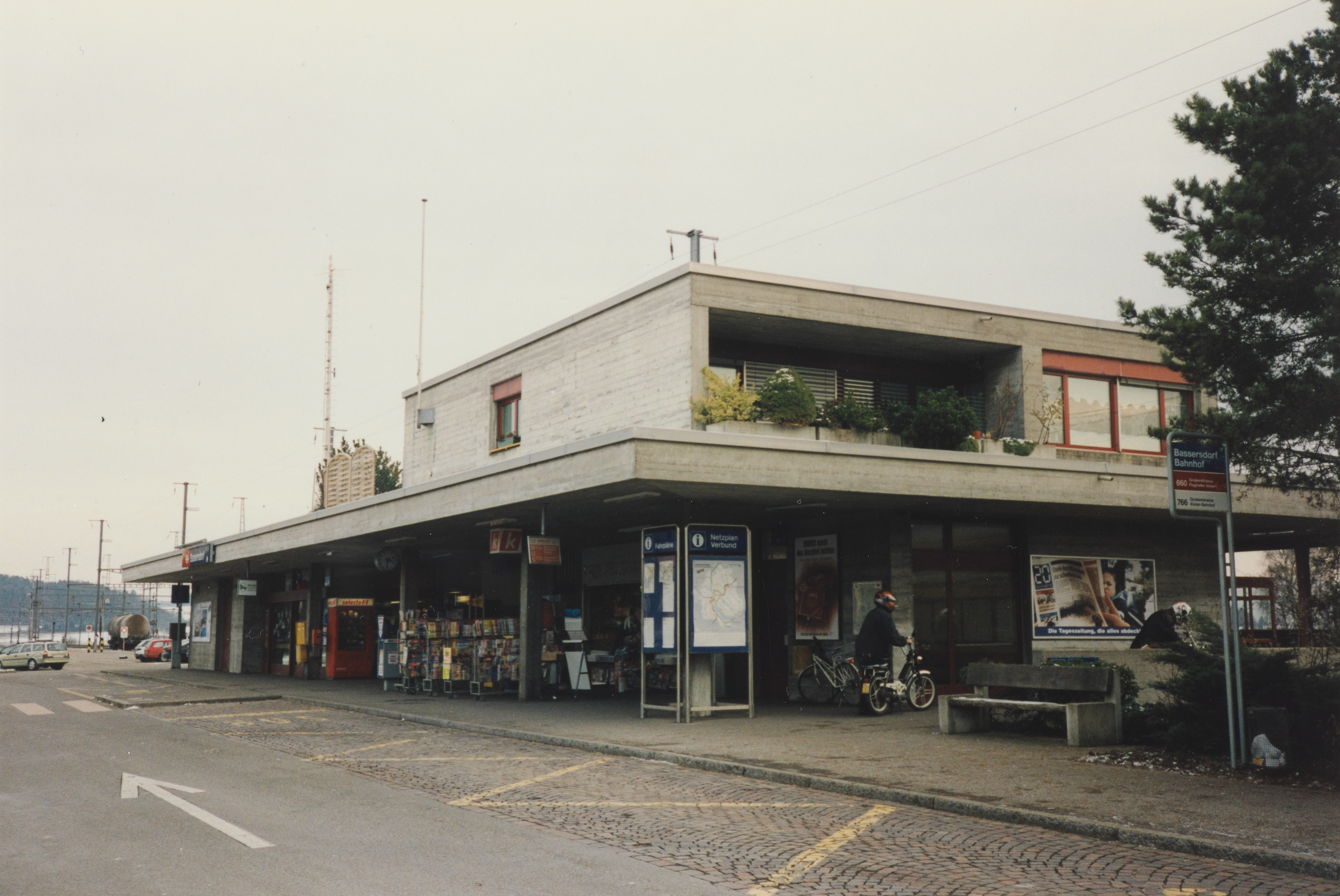
Current station building, street-side (2000)

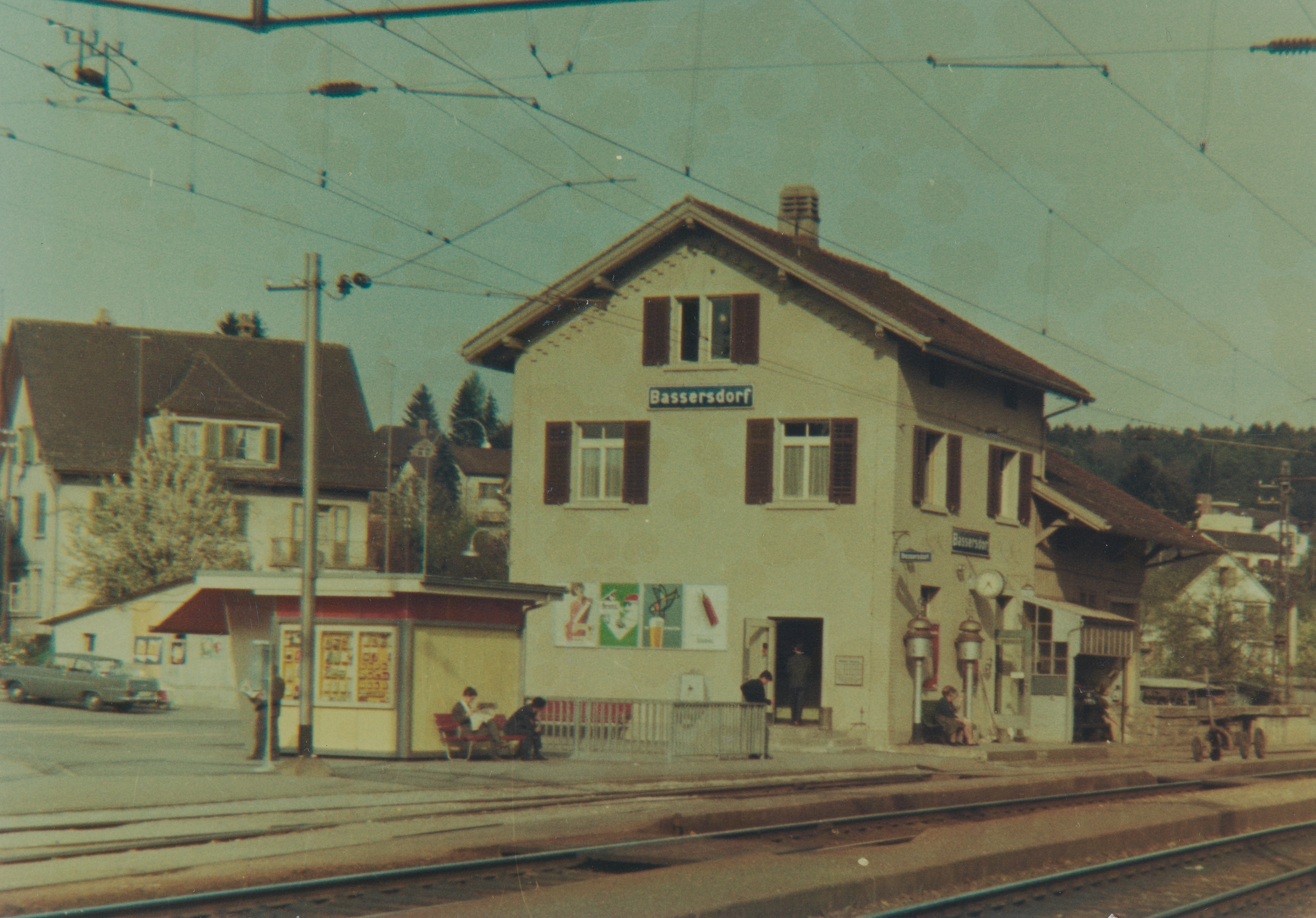
The old building in 1970 at the old location of the station. The building was demolished in 2012

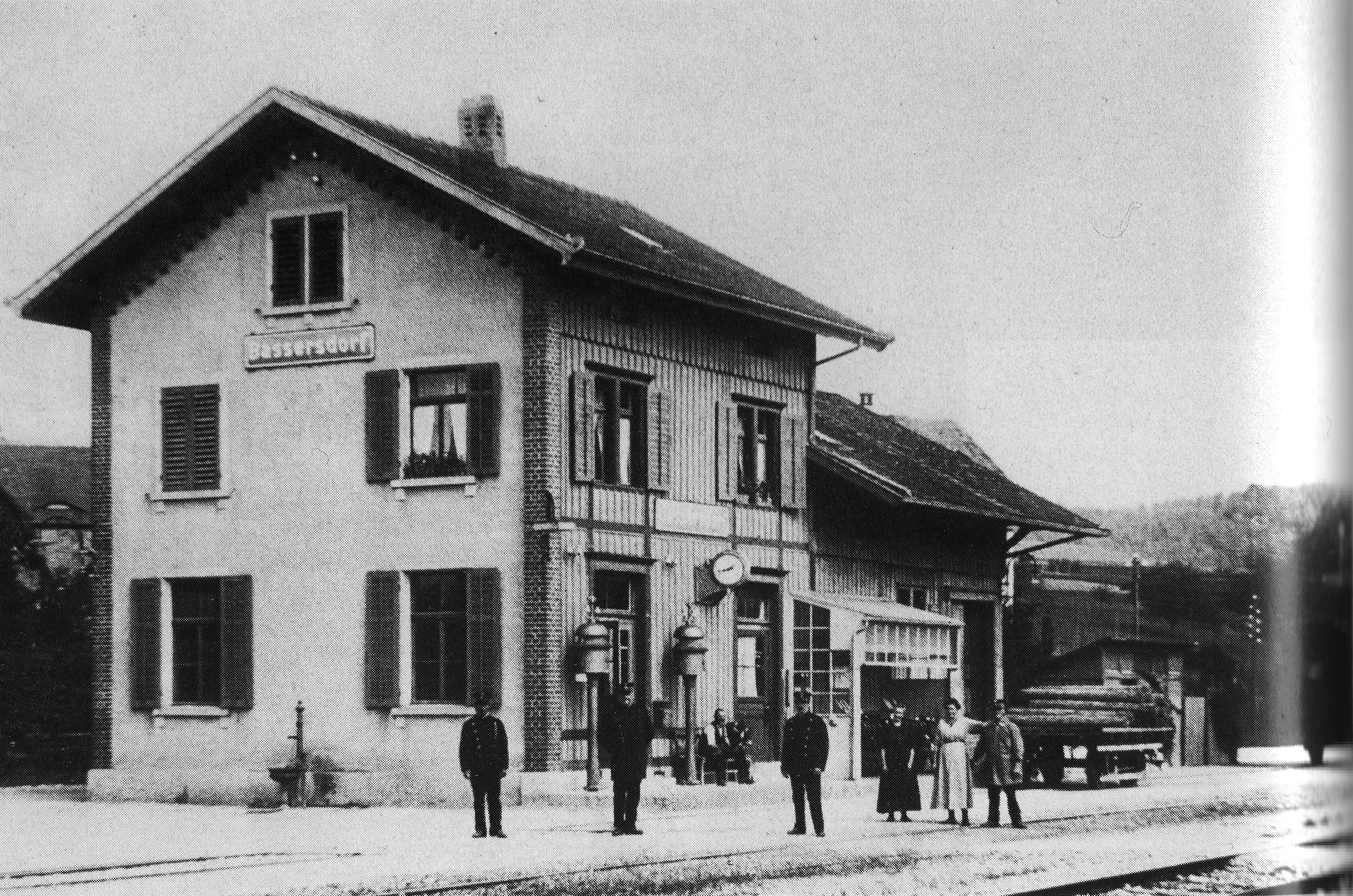
The old station in ca. 1920

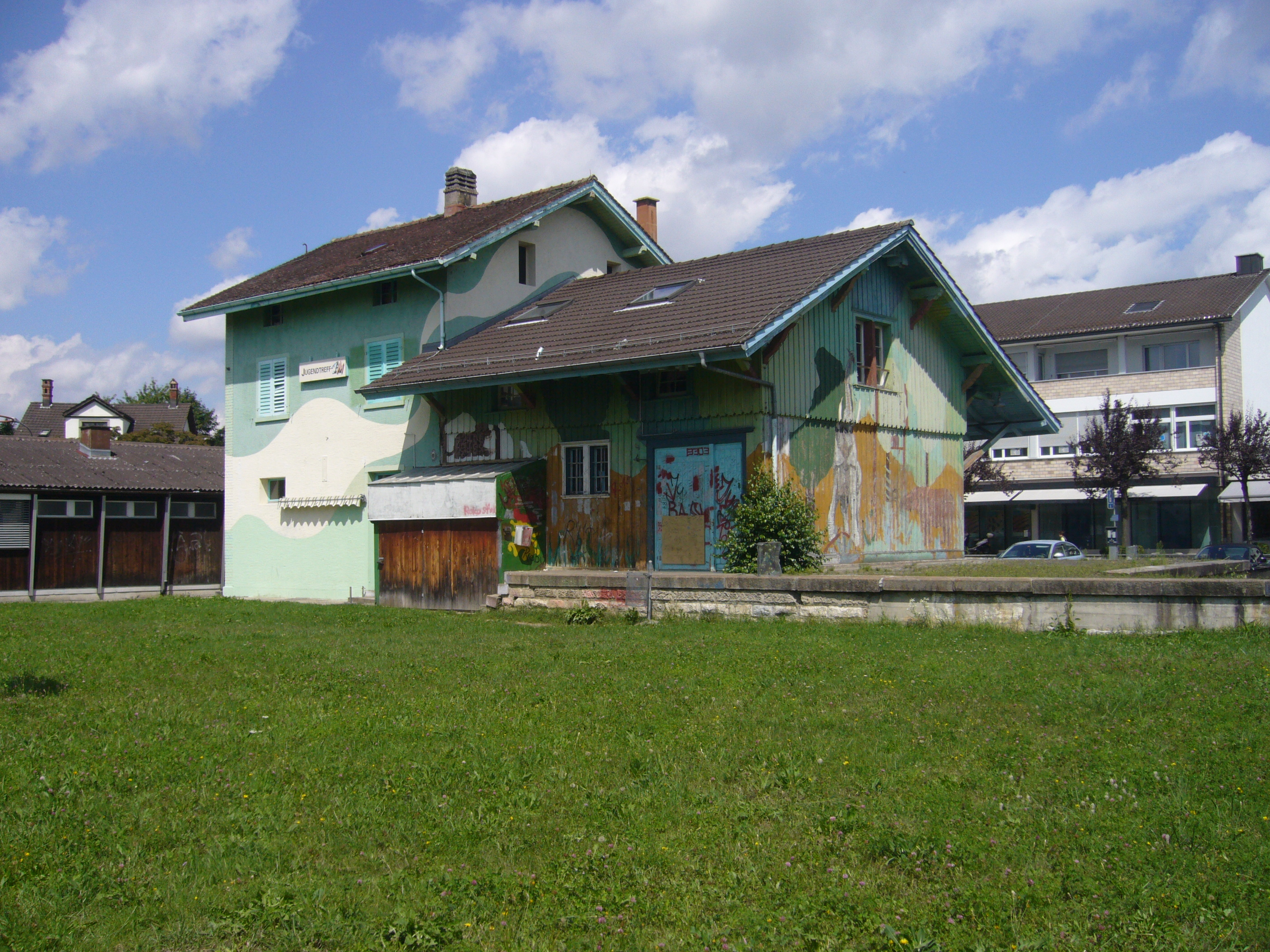
The former station building in 2010, 30 years after the last train

== See also ==
- Rail transport in Switzerland
