= S7 (ZVV) =

Railway service in Switzerland

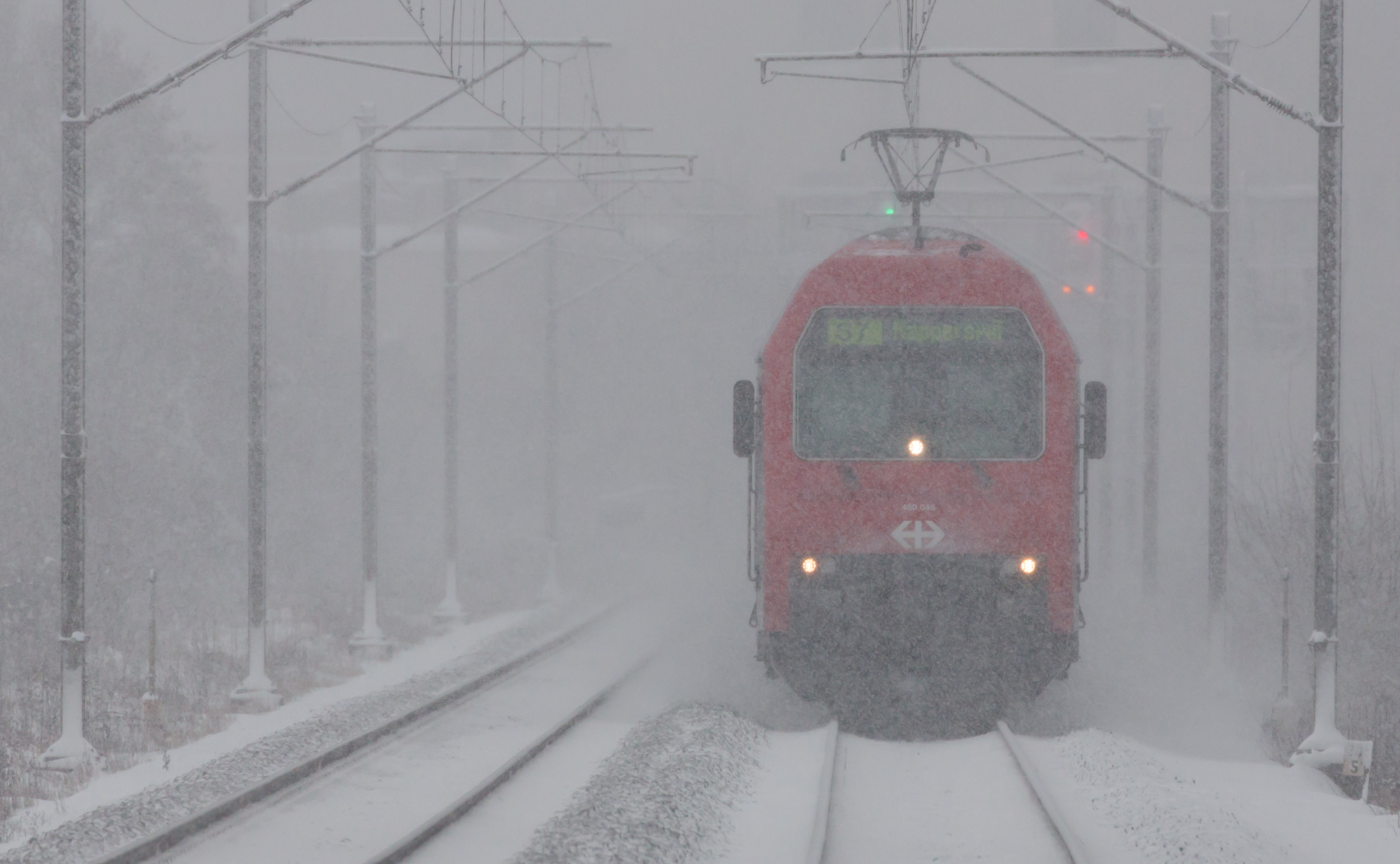
- S7 between Kemptthal and Effretikon

Overview
- Status: Operational
- Locale: Zürich, Switzerland
- Termini: Winterthur; Rapperswil
- Stations: 19
- Website: ZVV (in English)

Service
- Type: S-Bahn service
- System: Zürich S-Bahn
- Operator: Zürcher Verkehrsverbund (ZVV)
- Rolling stock: RABe 514 class; Re 450 class with double-decker coaches

Technical
- Track gauge: 1,435 mm (4 ft 8 1/2 in)

The S7 is a regional railway service of the Zürich S-Bahn on the ZVV (Zürich transportation network) and is one of the network's trunk services.

Zürich S-Bahn network as of December 2018

At Zürich HB, trains of the S7 service usually depart from underground tracks (Gleis) 41–44 (Museumstrasse station).

== Route ==
- S7 Winterthur–Kloten–Hardbrücke–Zürich HB–Meilen–Rapperswil

The service links Winterthur, in the northeast of the canton of Zürich, and Rapperswil-Jona, on the on north shore of Lake Zürich but just over the cantonal boundary in the canton of St. Gallen. From Winterthur, the service runs over the main Zurich–Winterthur railway line to Effretikon, but then takes the secondary route via Kloten to Zürich Oerlikon, from where it proceeds through Zürich via Zürich Hauptbahnhof and Zürich Stadelhofen. From Stadelhofen, trains then run over the Lake Zürich right-bank railway line to Rapperswil. Between Stadelhofen and Meilen trains run non-stop, with a parallel stopping service provided by lines S6 and S16.

The following stations are served:

- Winterthur Hauptbahnhof
- Kemptthal
- Effretikon
- Bassersdorf
- Kloten
- Kloten Balsberg
- Opfikon
- Zürich Oerlikon
- Zürich Hardbrücke
- Zürich Hauptbahnhof
- Zürich Stadelhofen
- Meilen
- Uetikon
- Männedorf
- Stäfa
- Uerikon
- Feldbach
- Kempraten
- Rapperswil

== Rolling stock ==
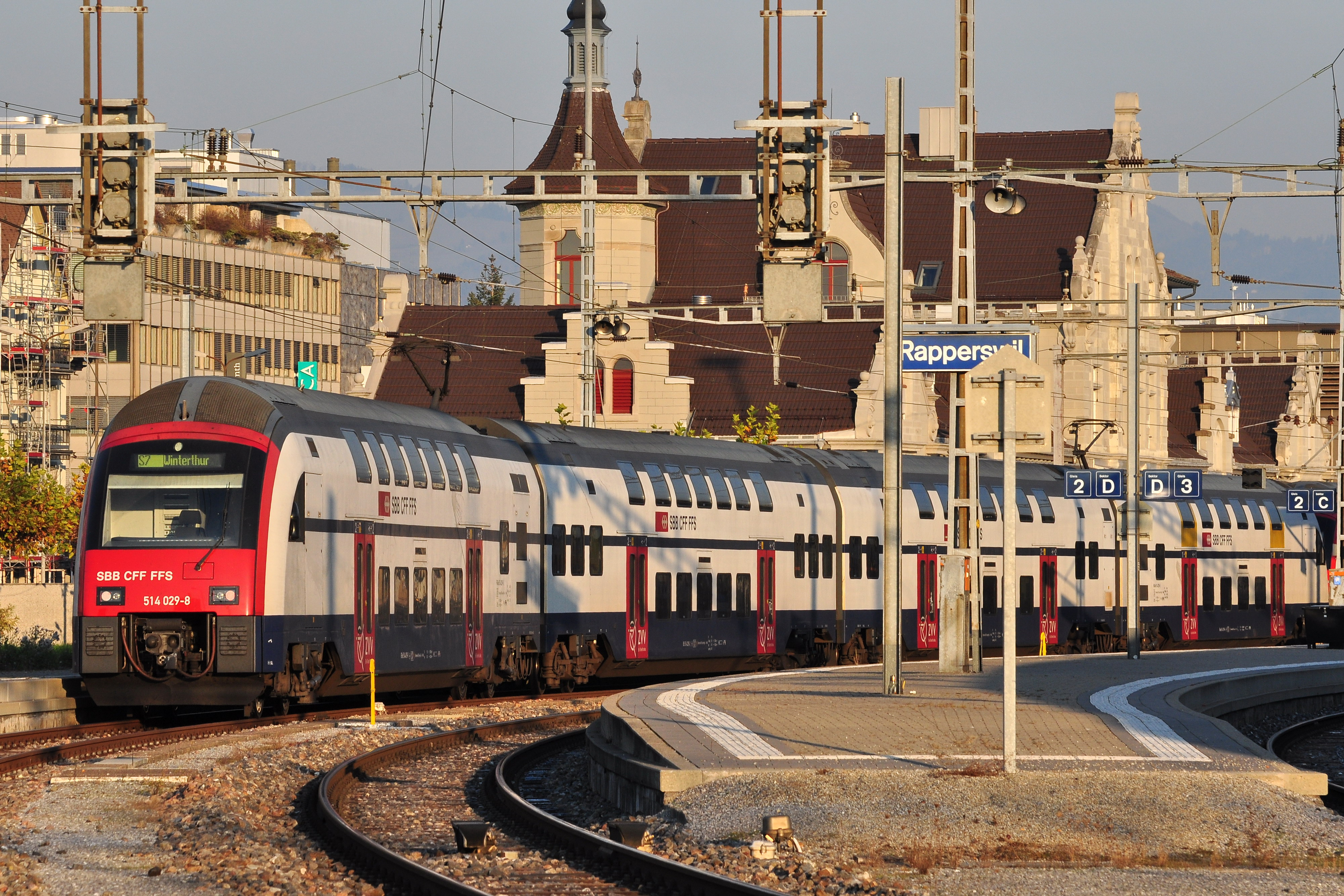
RABe 514 EMU operating as S7 service at Rapperswil railway station, as seen from Seedamm.

As of the December 2022 timetable change, services are operated by RABe 511 EMUs or Re 450 locomotives push-pulling double-deck coaches. RABe 514 ("DTZ") EMUs were used previously.

== Scheduling ==
The normal frequency is one train every 30 minutes. A journey over the full length of the service takes 74 minutes.

Currently, the section between Kloten and Opfikon is being upgraded to a double-track section, to make a 15-minute frequency possible in the near future.

== See also ==
- Rail transport in Switzerland
- List of railway stations in Zurich
- Public transport in Zurich
- ZVV fare zones
