= Zurich Airport railway station =

Railway station serving Zurich Airport in Switzerland

Zürich Flughafen
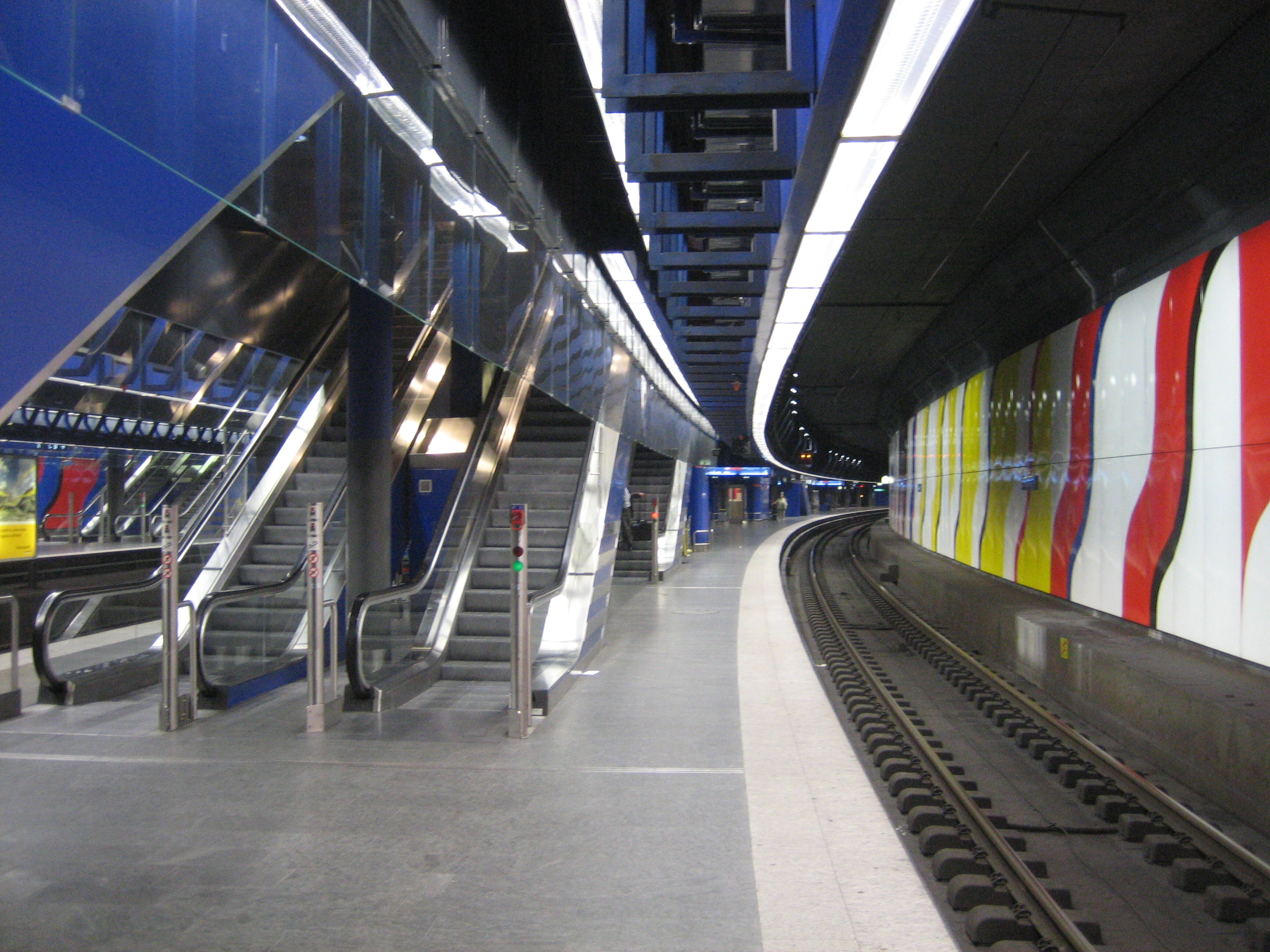
- The underground platforms at the station in 2006

General information
- Location: Kloten; Switzerland
- Coordinates: 47°27′01″N 8°33′45″E
- Elevation: 413 m (1,355 ft)
- Owner: Swiss Federal Railways
- Line: Zurich–Winterthur line
- Distance: 9.6 km (6.0 mi) from Zürich Hauptbahnhof
- Platforms: 2 island platforms
- Tracks: 4
- Train operators: Swiss Federal Railways
- Connections
- Tram: VBZ / VBG 10 12
- Bus: PostAuto 510 520 521 524 530 531; VBG 731 732 733 734 735 736 739 759 765 768

Construction
- Structure type: Underground

Other information
- IATA code: ZRH
- Fare zone: 121 (ZVV)

History
- Opened: 1 June 1980

Passengers
- 2025: 53,300 per day (SBB, THURBO)
- Rank: 11 out of 1,095

Services
| Preceding station | SBB CFF FFS | Following station |
|---|---|---|
| Zürich HB Terminus | EuroCity | Winterthur towards München Hbf |
| Zürich Oerlikon towards Geneva Airport | IC 1 | Winterthur towards St. Gallen |
| Zürich HB towards Lausanne | IC 5 | Winterthur towards St. Gallen or Rorschach |
| Zürich HB towards Brig | IC 8 | Winterthur towards Romanshorn |
| Zürich HB towards Interlaken Ost | IC 81 | Winterthur towards Romanshorn |
| Zürich Oerlikon towards Zürich HB | IR 13 | Winterthur towards Sargans |
| Zürich Oerlikon towards Basel SBB | IR 36 | Terminus |
| Zürich HB towards Lucerne | IR 75 | Winterthur towards Konstanz |
| Preceding station | Zurich S-Bahn | Following station |
| Zürich Oerlikon towards Ziegelbrücke | S2 | Terminus |
| Zürich Oerlikon towards Herrliberg-Feldmeilen | S16 | Terminus |
| Zürich Oerlikon towards Zug | S24 | Bassersdorf towards Thayngen or Weinfelden |
Location
- Location within Switzerland Location within Canton of Zurich

Zurich Airport railway station (German: Bahnhof Zürich Flughafen) is a railway station serving Zurich Airport in Switzerland. The station is located underneath the Airport Centre, the main ground-side passenger terminal of the airport, which is in the canton of Zurich and the municipality of Kloten. It is located within fare zone 121 of the Zürcher Verkehrsverbund (ZVV).

== History ==
When Zurich Airport first opened in 1948, the nearest railway was the single-track line from Oerlikon to Effretikon, forming a loop off the original main line of the Zurich to Winterthur line. This line passed through Kloten Balsberg and Kloten stations, which are respectively 1.5 kilometres (0.93 mi) and 2.1 kilometres (1.3 mi) from the airport terminal. On 1 June 1980 and in order to improve access to the airport, a new main line opened between Oerlikon and Effretikon. The new line passed under the airport terminal, and the airport railway station was opened. Originally the station was planned to be served only by intercity trains, but it is now served by a mixture of long distance and suburban trains.

The previous line from Oerlikon through Kloten Balsberg and Kloten to Bassersdorf was retained, and is used by suburban trains that do not call at the airport and freight trains. The section from Bassersdorf to Effretikon was abandoned, and trains off the Kloten line now join the new line for this section of their journey. Other suburban trains use the original main line through Dietlikon.

== Layout and facilities ==
=== Train ===
The station is situated on the airport railway line between Oerlikon and Effretikon, which forms one variant of the Zurich to Winterthur main line. The station, which is entirely underground, has two island platforms serving four tracks, each with a length of 400 metres (1,300 ft). The platforms are linked to the Airport Centre, which contains the station ticket office, by escalators and lifts. The Airport Centre also contains several floors of retail and catering facilities, as well as access, via check-in and security, to the Airside Center and gate lounges.

Summary of track (Gleis) usage:

- Track 1: EuroCity,,, towards Winterthur; S2 towards Zürich HB.
- Track 2:,, S24 towards Winterthur.
- Track 3:,,,,, S16 towards Zürich HB.
- Track 4:,, S24 towards Zürich HB.

=== Bus and tram ===
The airport terminal complex also includes a bus station, served by regional bus lines (PostAuto, VBG), and a station on the Glattal light rail system, served by VBZ/VBG lines 10 and 12, which connect to the Zurich tram network. These can be accessed from the station via the Airport Centre.

Lines with selected stops

Line 10: (Löwenplatz (Note: Only boarding as this stop lies on the turning loop of the line. Bahnhofplatz/HB is the terminus in the opposite direction) –) Bahnhofplatz/HB – Central – ETH/Universitätsspital – Seilbahn Rigiblick – Milchbuck – Sternen Oerlikon – Bhf. Oerlikon Ost – Glattpark – Bhf. Glattbrugg – Bhf. Balsberg – Zurich Airport (Zurich)

Line 12: Stettbach – Glatt – Bhf. Wallisellen – Glattpark – Bhf. Glattbrugg – Bhf. Balsberg – Zurich Airport (Zurich)

== Operation ==
The station is served by approximately 300 trains per day, formed of a mixture of EuroCity (EC) InterCity (IC) and InterRegio (IR) trains, serving cities throughout Switzerland (and some in Austria and Germany), as well as Zurich S-Bahn trains on lines S2, S16 and S24. All trains in southern direction call at Zürich Hauptbahnhof, the city's main railway station, with, for most of the day, some 13 trains per hour (tph) taking between 9 and 13 minutes for the journey. Some trains also serve other stations in Zurich.

The airport station is also linked to Konstanz, just over the border in Germany, by an hourly Swiss InterRegio train. Several daily EuroCity trains call at the airport station en route from Zürich Hauptbahnhof to Bregenz (Austria), and several German cities as far as Munich (runs as EuroCity-Express/ECE in Germany).

=== Services ===
As of the December 2023 timetable change, the following services stop at Zurich Airport:

- EuroCity (EC): service every two hours between Zürich HB and München Hbf, via Bregenz (runs as ECE 88 in Germany).
- InterCity:
  - /: half-hourly service between Geneva Airport or Lausanne and St. Gallen; hourly service to Rorschach.
  - /: hourly service between Spiez and Romanshorn; service every two hours from Spiez to Brig and Interlaken Ost.
- InterRegio:
  - : hourly service between Zürich HB and Sargans.
  - : hourly service to Basel SBB, via Zürich HB.
  - : hourly service between Lucerne and Konstanz.
- Zurich S-Bahn:
  - S2: half-hourly service to Ziegelbrücke, via Zürich HB.
  - S16: half-hourly service to Herrliberg-Feldmeilen, via Zürich HB.
  - S24: half-hourly service between Zug (via Zürich HB) and Winterthur; trains continue from Winterthur to Thayngen or Weinfelden.

== Gallery ==
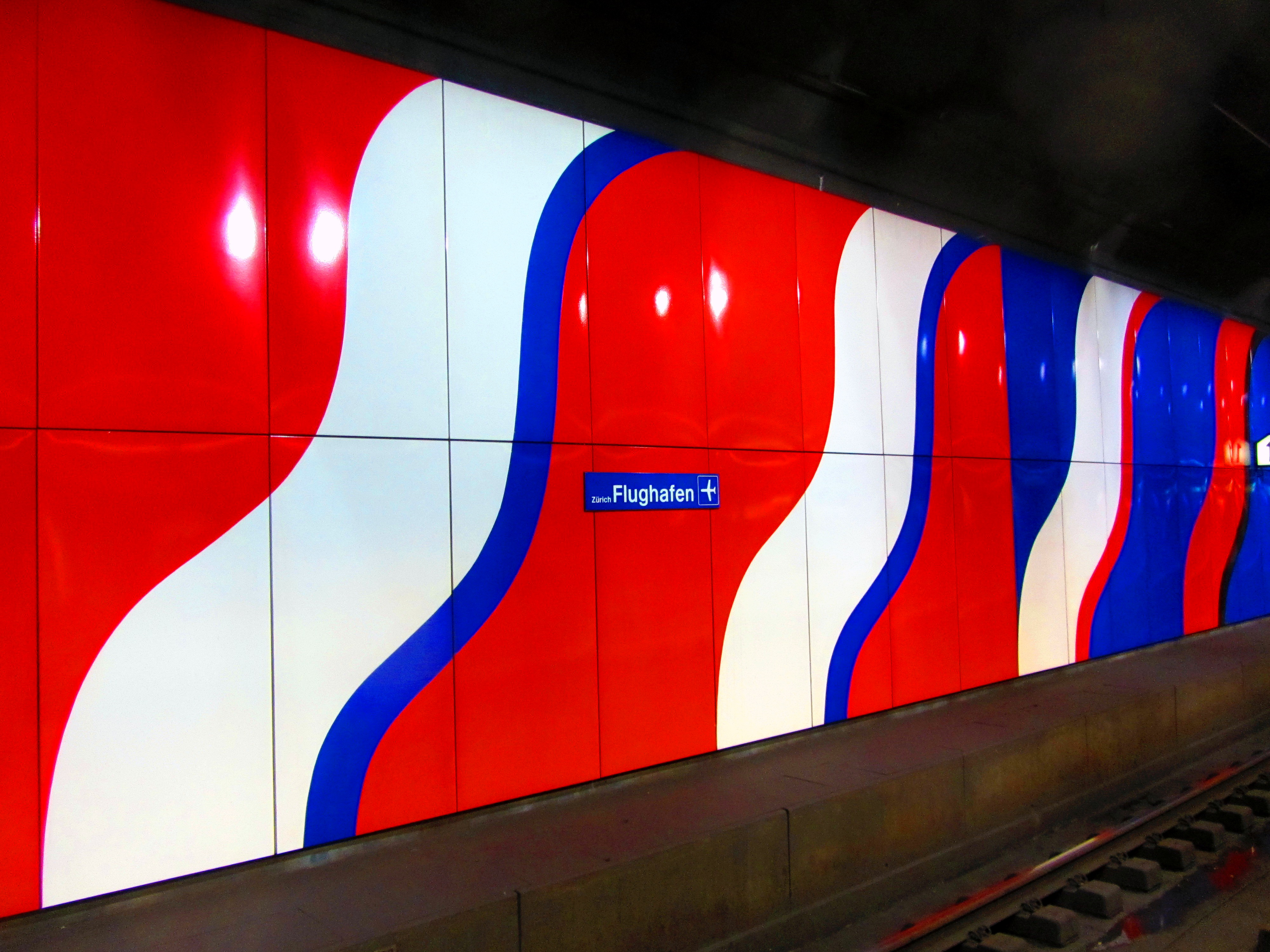
Wall art in the station

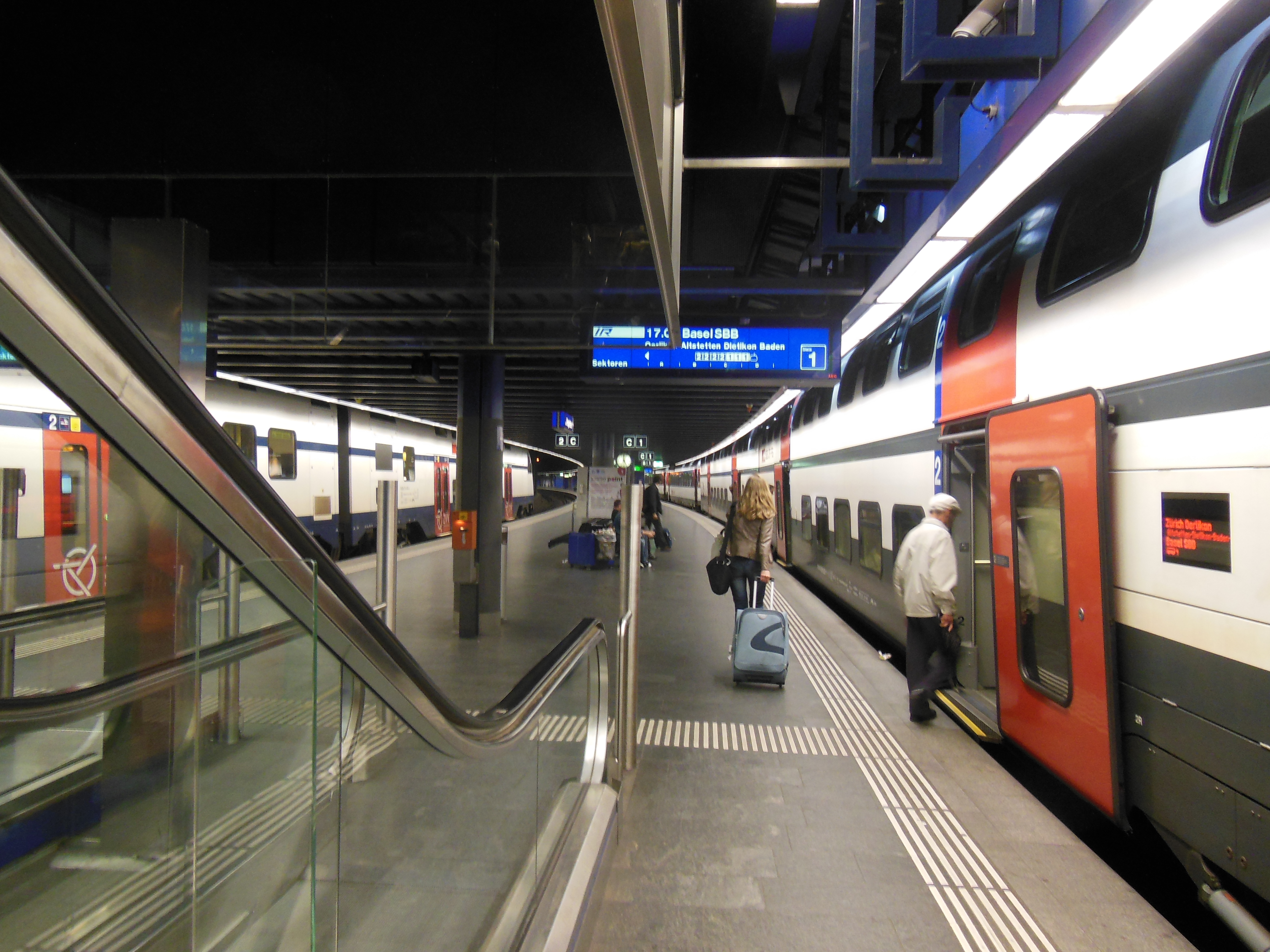
Double-deck S-Bahn (left) and InterRegio (right) trains in the station

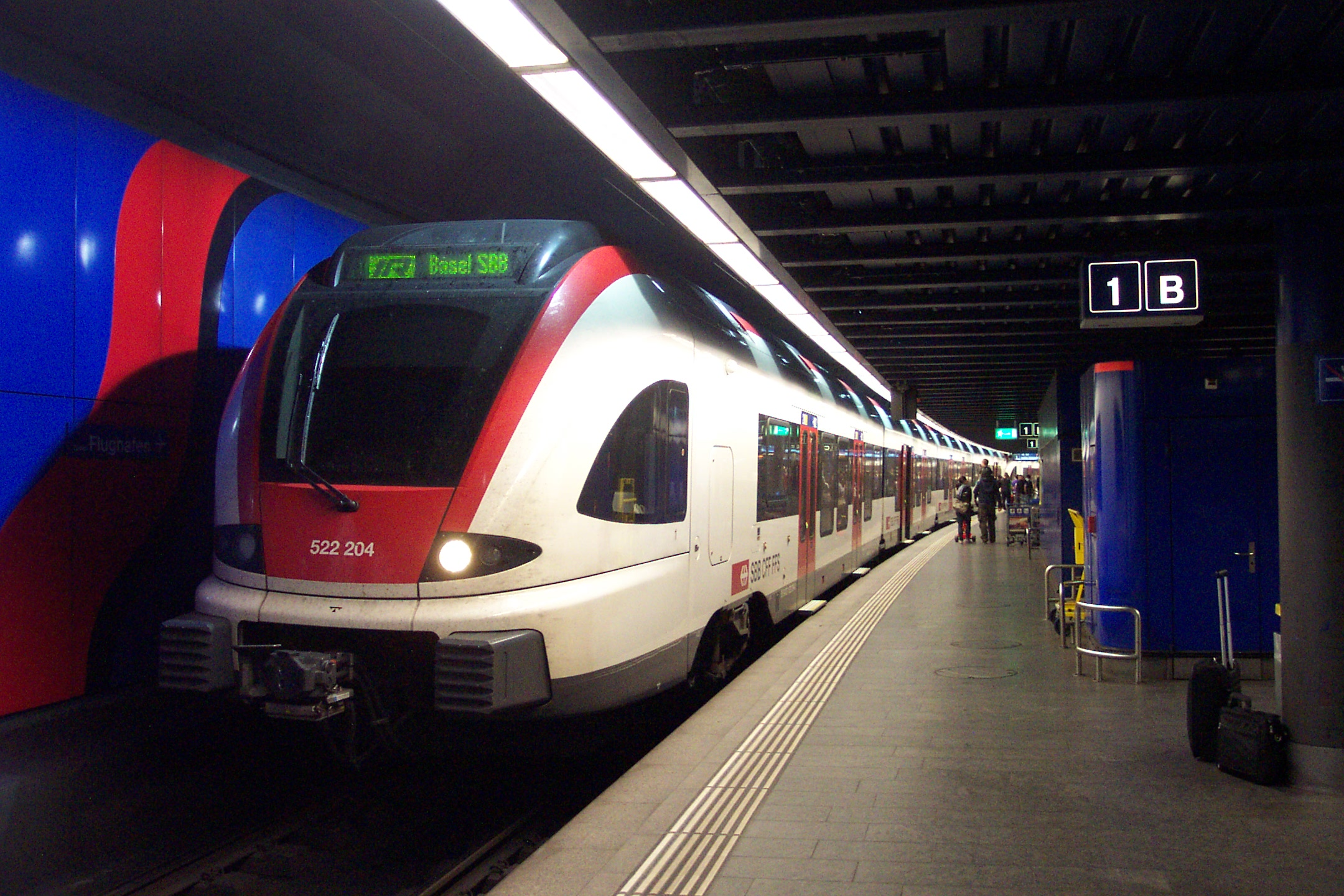
A train to Basel in the station

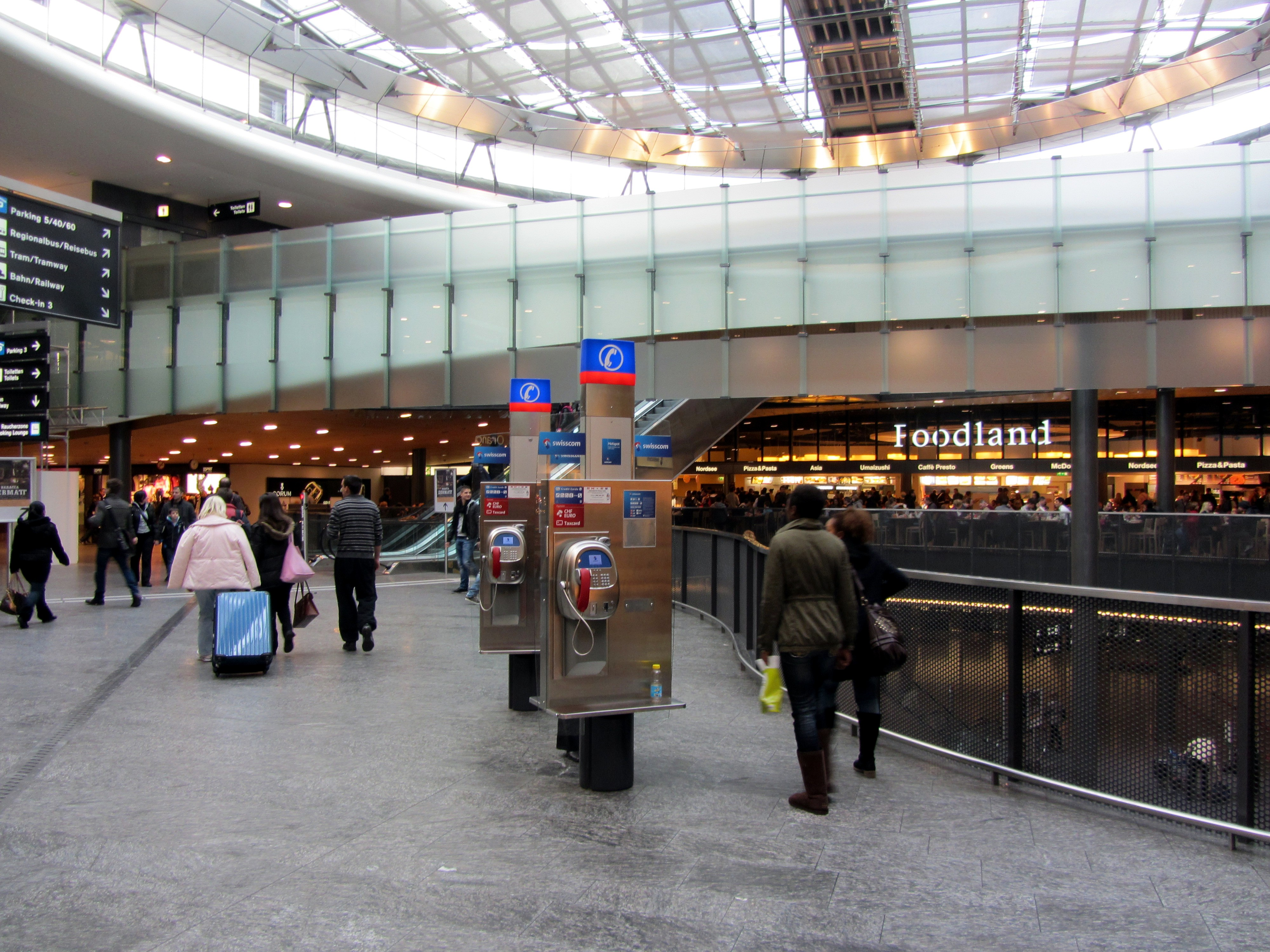
The Airport Centre at-grade level, one level above the station's offices and ticketing machines, and two levels above the tracks

== See also ==
- History of rail transport in Switzerland
- Rail transport in Switzerland
- ZVV
