= Kloten =

- Municipality
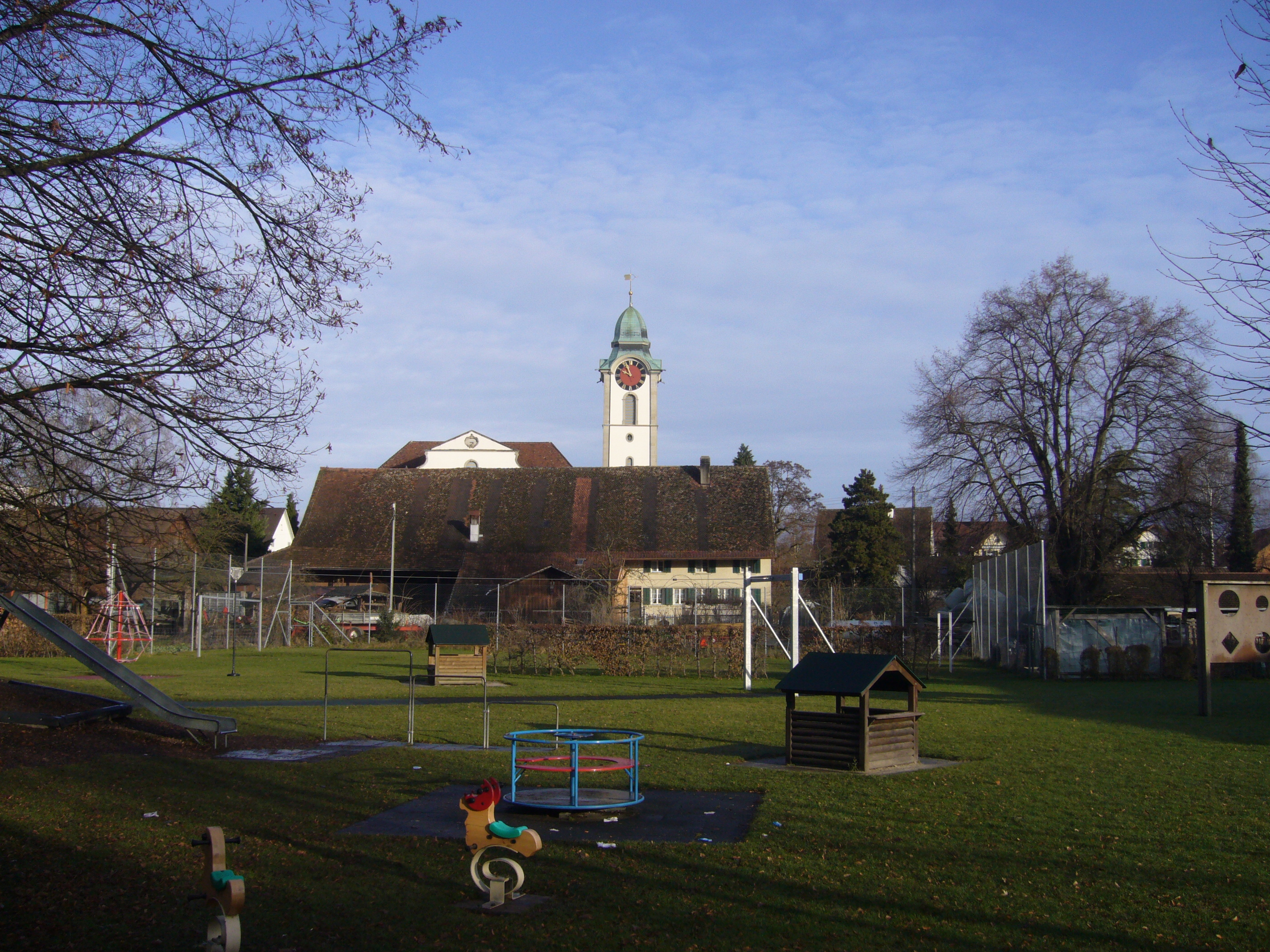
- Kloten

- Flag Coat of arms
- Location of Kloten
- Location within Switzerland Location within Canton of Zürich
- Coordinates: 47°27′N 8°35′E
- Country: Switzerland
- Canton: Zürich
- District: Bülach

Government
  - Executive: Stadtrat with 7 members
  - Mayor: Stadtpräsident; René Huber (as of March 2014)
  - Parliament: Gemeindeparlament with 32 members

Area
  - Total: 19.28 km^{2} (7.44 sq mi)
- Elevation: 446 m (1,463 ft)

Population (December 2020)
  - Total: 20,429
  - Density: 1,060/km^{2} (2,744/sq mi)
- Time zone: UTC+01:00 (CET)
  - Summer (DST): UTC+02:00 (CEST)
- Postal code: 8302
- SFOS number: 62
- ISO 3166 code: CH-ZH
- Surrounded by: Bassersdorf, Dietlikon, Lufingen, Nürensdorf, Oberembrach, Opfikon, Rümlang, Wallisellen, Winkel
- Twin towns: Cape Canaveral (USA)
- Website: kloten.ch

Kloten (German pronunciation: [ˈkloːtn̩]) is a municipality in the district of Bülach in the canton of Zürich in Switzerland, and belongs to the Glatt Valley (German: Glatttal).

== History ==
Kloten is first mentioned in 1155 as Chlotun.

== Geography ==
Aerial view from 100 m by Walter Mittelholzer (1919)

Kloten is located in the Glatt Valley, some 10 km (6.2 mi) north of the city of Zürich. It is the nearest village to Zurich Airport, and the airport terminal and much of the airfield are within the municipal boundaries.

Kloten has an area of 19.3 km^{2} (7.5 sq mi). Of this area, 34.1% is used for agricultural purposes, while 26.7% is forested. Of the rest of the land, 38.2% is settled (buildings or roads) and the remainder (1%) is non-productive (rivers, glaciers or mountains).

== Demographics ==
Kloten has a population (as of 31 December 2020) of 20,429. As of 2007, 26.8% of the population was made up of foreign nationals. Over the last 10 years, the population has grown at a rate of 6.4%. Most of the population (as of 2000) speaks German (78.8%), with Italian being second most common (4.2%) and Serbo-Croatian being third (3.1%).

In the 2007 election the most popular party was the SVP which received 46.1% of the vote. The next three most popular parties were the SPS (16.3%), the CSP (9.5%) and the FDP (8.7%).

The age distribution of the population (as of 2000) is children and teenagers (0–19 years old) make up 19.2% of the population, while adults (20–64 years old) make up 68.3% and seniors (over 64 years old) make up 12.5%. In Kloten about 70.3% of the population (between age 25–64) have completed either non-mandatory upper secondary education or additional higher education (either university or a Fachhochschule).

Kloten has an unemployment rate of 3.12%. As of 2005, there were 91 people employed in the primary economic sector and about 28 businesses involved in this sector; 4,545 people are employed in the secondary sector and there are 109 businesses in this sector; 23,154 people are employed in the tertiary sector, with 888 businesses in this sector. The historical population is given in the following table:

year	population
1467	c. 370
1634	842
1710	1,328
1850	1,524
1900	1,363
1950	3,429
1970	16,388
2000	17,190
2022	20,909

== Services ==
There is one library providing books, DVDs, newspapers, etc.

== Transportation ==
The passenger terminal of Zurich Airport lies in the west of the municipality of Kloten, and much of the rest of the airport is also within the municipal boundaries. A large amount of ground transportation infrastructure, both road and rail, serves the airport and, to a lesser extent, the rest of Kloten.

Kloten is linked with Zürich via the A51 motorway and with Bülach via the same motorway. It also lies on roads taking to many places, such as Winterthur to the east.

There are three railway stations within the municipality. The airport's railway station, Zürich Flughafen, is situated in the basement of the airport terminal, and is served by long-distance trains to cities throughout Switzerland, as well as by Zürich S-Bahn lines S2, S16 and S24. Kloten station and Balsberg station are served by S-Bahn line S7. The west of the municipality is also served by Zürich tram routes 10 and 12, operating over the Stadtbahn Glattal light rail system. The trams serve stops at Zurich Airport, and at Balsberg station.

Parkbahn runs in the park at The Circle.

== Economy ==
Swiss International Air Lines has an office on the property of Zurich Airport and in Kloten, consisting of the Alpha, Bravo, and Charlie buildings. Swiss World Cargo has its head office in the Alpha and Bravo buildings. Swiss Private Aviation has its head office in the Swiss complex. The corporate offices for Swissôtel are located in the Prioria Business Center on the property of Zurich Airport and in Kloten.

When Swissair existed, its head office was on the property of Zurich Airport and in Kloten.

== Sport ==
Kloten is home to EHC Kloten of the National League (NL). The team plays its home games in the 7,800-seat Swiss Arena.

== Education ==
The Schule Kloten is the city's school system, holding primary school classes in four campuses and sekundarstufe classes in two campuses.

Primary school campuses include Dorf/Feld Primar, Hinterwelden Primar, Nägelimoos Primar, and Spitz Primar. The two secondary campuses are Nägelimoos Sekundar and Spitz Sekundar. In addition there is a Berufswahlschule and a Musikschule.

== Notable people ==
- Alexander Rückstuhl (born 1971) rower, competed in men's quadruple sculls at the 1992 Summer Olympics
- Damien Brunner (born 1986) professional ice hockey forward
- Charyl Chappuis (born 1992) professional footballer, has played 20 games for Thailand
- Peter Nielsen (1967–2004) former air traffic controller, who was killed by Vitaly Kaloyev

== Climate ==
Kloten has an oceanic climate (Köppen Cfb), with sizeable continental influences due to its relative elevation and distance to any large bodies of water. Precipitation is high year-round and as a result of the cold winter nights, snowfall is frequent in winter. Due to the mild afternoons, this snow seldom sticks around for long periods of time. Summers are warm with frequent convective rainfall. The skies are generally gloomy, with a slight reversal of the trend during summer.

Climate data for Zürich/Kloten (1991–2020 normals, extremes since 1955)
Month	Jan	Feb	Mar	Apr	May	Jun	Jul	Aug	Sep	Oct	Nov	Dec	Year
Record high °C (°F)	16.8 (62.2)	19.5 (67.1)	23.1 (73.6)	29.6 (85.3)	32.0 (89.6)	36.0 (96.8)	36.5 (97.7)	37.1 (98.8)	31.7 (89.1)	26.2 (79.2)	22.2 (72.0)	16.9 (62.4)	37.1 (98.8)
Mean maximum °C (°F)	11.8 (53.2)	14.0 (57.2)	19.3 (66.7)	23.9 (75.0)	27.6 (81.7)	31.2 (88.2)	32.7 (90.9)	31.9 (89.4)	26.9 (80.4)	22.0 (71.6)	16.3 (61.3)	12.0 (53.6)	33.5 (92.3)
Mean daily maximum °C (°F)	3.8 (38.8)	5.7 (42.3)	10.9 (51.6)	15.5 (59.9)	19.5 (67.1)	23.2 (73.8)	25.2 (77.4)	24.8 (76.6)	19.9 (67.8)	14.3 (57.7)	8.0 (46.4)	4.3 (39.7)	14.6 (58.3)
Daily mean °C (°F)	0.9 (33.6)	1.6 (34.9)	5.6 (42.1)	9.6 (49.3)	13.8 (56.8)	17.4 (63.3)	19.2 (66.6)	18.7 (65.7)	14.4 (57.9)	9.9 (49.8)	4.7 (40.5)	1.6 (34.9)	9.8 (49.6)
Mean daily minimum °C (°F)	−2.3 (27.9)	−2.6 (27.3)	0.2 (32.4)	3.4 (38.1)	7.7 (45.9)	11.4 (52.5)	13.2 (55.8)	12.9 (55.2)	9.1 (48.4)	5.6 (42.1)	1.3 (34.3)	−1.4 (29.5)	4.9 (40.8)
Mean minimum °C (°F)	−9.8 (14.4)	−9.3 (15.3)	−5.8 (21.6)	−2.5 (27.5)	2.0 (35.6)	5.8 (42.4)	8.4 (47.1)	7.9 (46.2)	3.5 (38.3)	−0.8 (30.6)	−5.5 (22.1)	−8.4 (16.9)	−12.5 (9.5)
Record low °C (°F)	−25.0 (−13.0)	−23.9 (−11.0)	−17.2 (1.0)	−6.1 (21.0)	−5.0 (23.0)	1.1 (34.0)	5.0 (41.0)	1.1 (34.0)	−0.5 (31.1)	−7.3 (18.9)	−12.0 (10.4)	−17.2 (1.0)	−25.0 (−13.0)
Average precipitation mm (inches)	65 (2.6)	56 (2.2)	65 (2.6)	70 (2.8)	110 (4.3)	102 (4.0)	116 (4.6)	108 (4.3)	80 (3.1)	82 (3.2)	74 (2.9)	80 (3.1)	1,009 (39.7)
Average snowfall cm (inches)	11 (4.3)	11 (4.3)	6 (2.4)	0 (0)	0 (0)	0 (0)	0 (0)	0 (0)	0 (0)	1 (0.4)	4 (1.6)	13 (5.1)	46 (18)
Average precipitation days (≥ 1.0 mm)	9.8	8.8	9.6	9.7	11.5	11.1	11.2	11.4	9.0	10.2	9.9	10.9	123.1
Average snowy days (≥ 1.0 cm)	3.5	3.5	1.7	0.2	0.0	0.0	0.0	0.0	0.0	0.1	1.0	3.2	13.2
Average relative humidity (%)	83	79	73	69	72	72	71	74	79	84	86	85	77
Mean monthly sunshine hours	50	82	139	177	195	217	238	219	159	94	49	38	1,657
Percentage possible sunshine	19	30	40	45	44	49	53	53	45	30	19	18	40
Source 1: MeteoSwiss
Source 2: Infoclimat
