= Kloten railway station =

Railway station in Kloten, Switzerland

Kloten
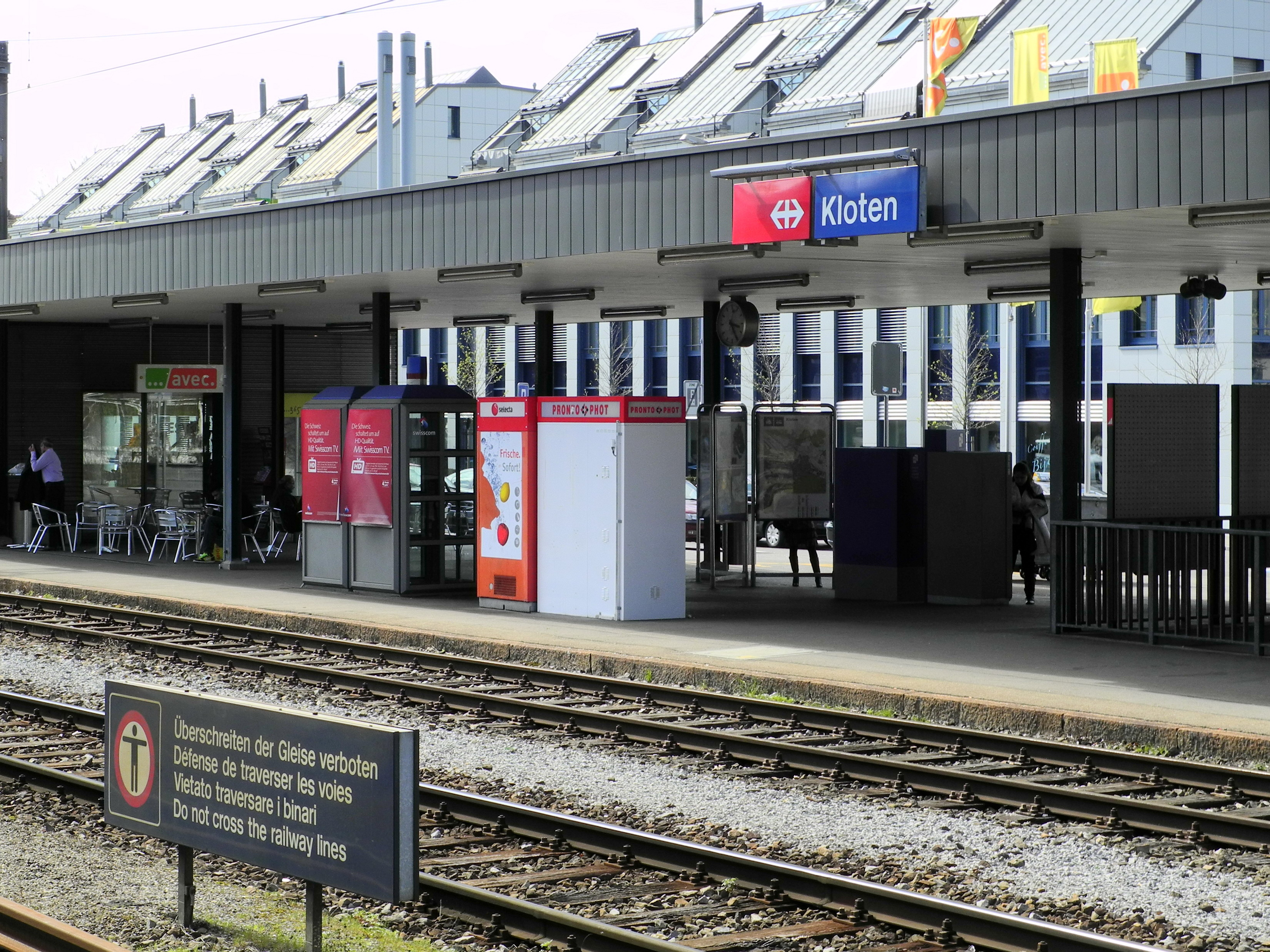
- Kloten railway station in 2012

General information
- Location: Lindenstrasse; Kloten, Zurich; Switzerland
- Coordinates: 47.4482°N 8.582972°E
- Elevation: 447 m (1,467 ft)
- Owner: Swiss Federal Railways
- Operator: Swiss Federal Railways
- Line: Zurich–Winterthur line
- Platforms: 1 island platform
- Tracks: 4 (2 station tracks)

Other information
- Fare zone: 121 (ZVV)

Services
Preceding station	Zurich S-Bahn	Following station
Kloten Balsberg towards Rapperswil	S7	Bassersdorf towards Winterthur
Kloten Balsberg towards Stäfa	SN7 Limited service	Bassersdorf Terminus
Location
- Location within Switzerland Location within Canton of Zürich

Kloten is a railway station in the municipality of Kloten in the Swiss canton of Zurich. The station is located on the Zurich to Winterthur line and is an intermediate stop on Zurich S-Bahn line S7. It lies within fare zone 121 of the Zürcher Verkehrsverbund (ZVV).

Although the station is situated only 1.5 kilometres (0.93 mi) from the main terminal of Zurich Airport, it has been bypassed by the opening, in 1980, of a new line directly serving the Zurich Airport railway station in the basement of that terminal. Kloten is now only visited by the S7 and freight trains, while all other passenger trains on the line serve the airport.

== Layout and facilities ==
Kloten station consists of a single island platform providing access to tracks 3 and 4. Trains to Winterthur use track 3, while trains to Zurich use track 4. No platforms serve tracks 1 and 2.

The main entrance and station building is located on Lindenstrasse on the north side of the tracks. On the south side is a car and bicycle parking lot on Breitistrasse. A pedestrian underpass runs between Lindenstrasse and Breitistrasse, connecting the platform with the station building and parking lot.

== Services ==
=== S-Bahn ===
The station is only served by S-Bahn trains:

- Zurich S-Bahn:
  - S7 Winterthur–Kloten–Hardbrücke–Zürich HB–Meilen–Rapperswil
    Operates non stop between Stadelhofen and Meilen, Winterthur and Effretikon, stops in Kemptthal as of 9:20 PM.

During weekends, there is also a nighttime S-Bahn service calling at the station, offered by ZVV:

- SN7: hourly service between Bassersdorf and Stäfa via Zürich HB

=== Bus ===
Verkehrsbetriebe Glattal (VBG) bus routes 732, 733, 735, and 766 stop at the entrance on Lindenstrasse; buses 731 and 736 stop on Breitistrasse.

== See also ==
- Rail transport in Switzerland
