= Zurich–Winterthur railway =

Railway line in Switzerland

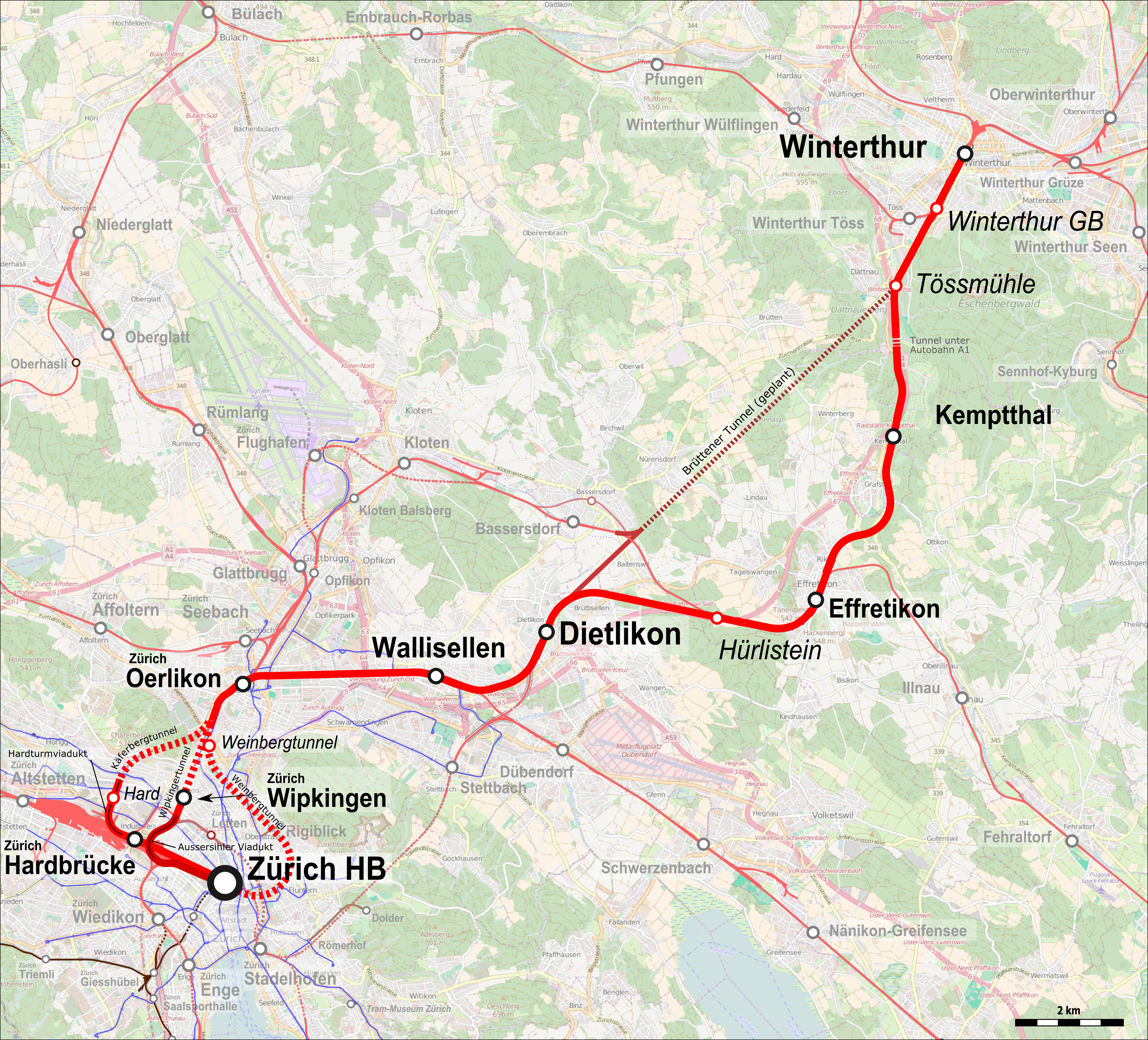

Overview
- Line number: 750
- Locale: Switzerland
- Termini: Zürich Hauptbahnhof; Winterthur

Technical
- Track length: via Wipkingen T: 26.1 km (16.2 mi); via Käferberg T: 27.8 km (17.3 mi); via Weinberg T: 28.4 km (17.6 mi)
- Track gauge: 1,435 mm (4 ft 8 1/2 in)
- Electrification: 15 kV/16.7 Hz AC overhead catenary
- Operating speed: 125 km/h (78 mph)
- Maximum incline: Portal of Weinberg Tunnel–Zürich Oerlikon: 3.5%; Kemptthal–Effretikon: 1.5%

The Zurich–Winterthur railway is Switzerland's busiest railway line. Opened in 1855, it runs from Zürich Hauptbahnhof to Winterthur via several routes. It is a bottleneck in Swiss rail transport. Practically all lines of the core network of the Zurich S-Bahn use parts of this line.

== History ==
The Zurich–Winterthur railway line is part of the route that the Zurich-Lake Constance Railway (Zürich-Bodenseebahn) planned to build from Zurich to Romanshorn. The Swiss Northeastern Railway (Schweizerische Nordostbahn) the successor to the Zurich-Lake Constance Railway opened the Winterthur–Romanshorn section on 18 May 1855 and the section from Winterthur to Oerlikon went into operation on 27 December. The rail link to Lake Constance was finally completed with the opening of the last section between Oerlikon and Zurich on 26 June 1856. The line was mostly double track from the start. It runs from Wipkingen to Oerlikon and from there via Wallisellen, Dietlikon and Effretikon to Winterthur. In 1902, the line became the property of the Swiss Federal Railways (SBB), which opened electrical operations on the line on 6 August 1925.

== Route sections ==
Overview of lines

The line contains several different routes. Only the section from Effretikon to Winterthur has no alternative route. Zürich Hauptbahnhof and Oerlikon are connected by three tunnels. Two of them run from the above-ground "old" terminus to Oerlikon. In 2014, with the commissioning of the Weinberg Tunnel, trains have run from the newly built underground station to Oerlikon. There are three connections from Oerlikon to Effretikon: via Wallisellen, Kloten and the Airport. The Zürichberg line, which runs from the Hauptbahnhof via Stadelhofen to Effretikon, is, with a few exceptions, only used by S-Bahn trains.

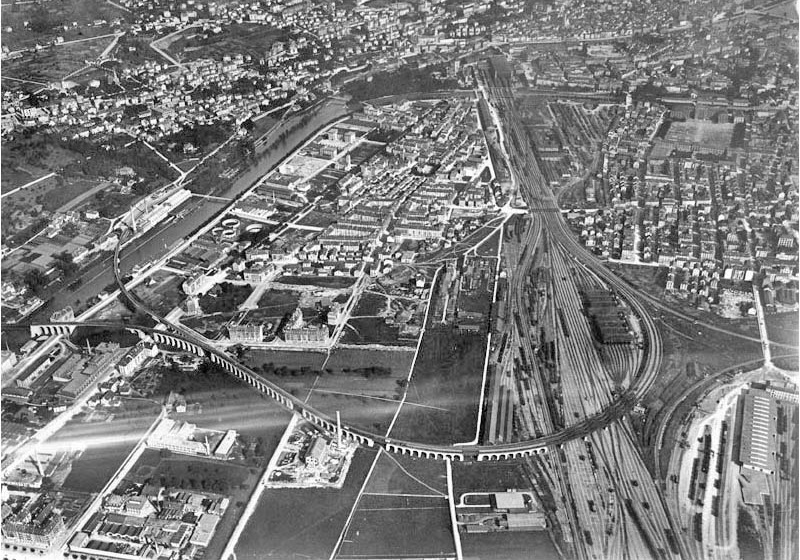
Photograph from 1898: the Aussersihl Viaduct

=== Wipkingen line (Zürich HB–Wipkingen–Oerlikon) ===
This was the first connection between Zürich HB and Oerlikon. It was opened on 26 June 1856 and still ran at that time over a ramp to the Limmat Bridge. This ran along the route now occupied by the street of Röntgenstrasse, which explains its sweeping course. Because this ramp was too steep for the locomotives of the period, it built the Aussersihl Viaduct (Aussersihler Viadukt) from the station approach; this has a more moderate slope due to its curved route. When it was built, it was the longest railway bridge in Switzerland at 834 metres. After running over a short section on the old line, it reaches the bridge over the Sihlquai and the Limmat. The two bridges together are also called the Wipkingen Viaduct (Wipkinger Viadukt). After the bridge, the line passes through Zürich Wipkingen station and then immediately runs through Wipkingen Tunnel, after which it continues for some distance in an open cutting, where it merges with the Käferberg line and finally reaches Zürich Oerlikon station. Although it was planned from the beginning as a double-track line, two-track operations only started on 30 May 1860. It has been electrified since 1925 and electrical operations started on 6 August of that year. The section is used by some long-distance trains and line S24.

=== Käferberg line (Zürich HB–Hardbrücke–Oerlikon) ===
The Käferberg line, named after the Käferberg Tunnel, is the second connection between Oerlikon and Oerlikon and the Hauptbahnhof. It was opened on 1 June 1969 as a direct connection between Oerlikon and Altstetten for freight trains. On 23 May 1982, double track was opened on the Hardturm Viaduct (Hardturmviadukt) connecting the Hauptbahnhof to Hardbrücke station, which initially had only had two platform edges on the ramp to the Hardturm viaduct. With the construction of the S-Bahn line between the Hauptbahnhof and Altstetten, two more platforms were added. Since the commissioning of the Zurich S-Bahn in 1990, S-Bahn services in the Limmat valley have also stopped at Hardbrücke. The Käferberg line is used by the trains of lines S3 (until Hardbrücke, extended during rush hour to Bülach), S6, S7, S9, S15, S16, and S21.

=== Oerlikon–Wallisellen–Effretikon ===
The Oerlikon–Effretikon section is the continuation of the Wipkingen line and was opened on 27 December 1855 by the Swiss Northeastern Railway (Schweizerische Nordostbahn). Until the opening of the airport line, this section carried almost all long-distance traffic. It was planned from the beginning as a double-track line, with the second track officially going into operation between Zurich and Wallisellen on 30 May 1860 and between Wallisellen and Effretikon in 1861. Electrical operations started on 6 August 1925. In Wallisellen, the Wallisellen–Uster–Rapperswil railway (also called the Glatthalbahn) branches off to Dübendorf, Uster and Rapperswil. The Zürichberg line branches off in Dietlikon. The section is served by trains on lines S3 (from Dietlikon), S8, S14 (to Wallisellen, branching to the Wallisellen–Uster–Rapperswil railway), and S19.

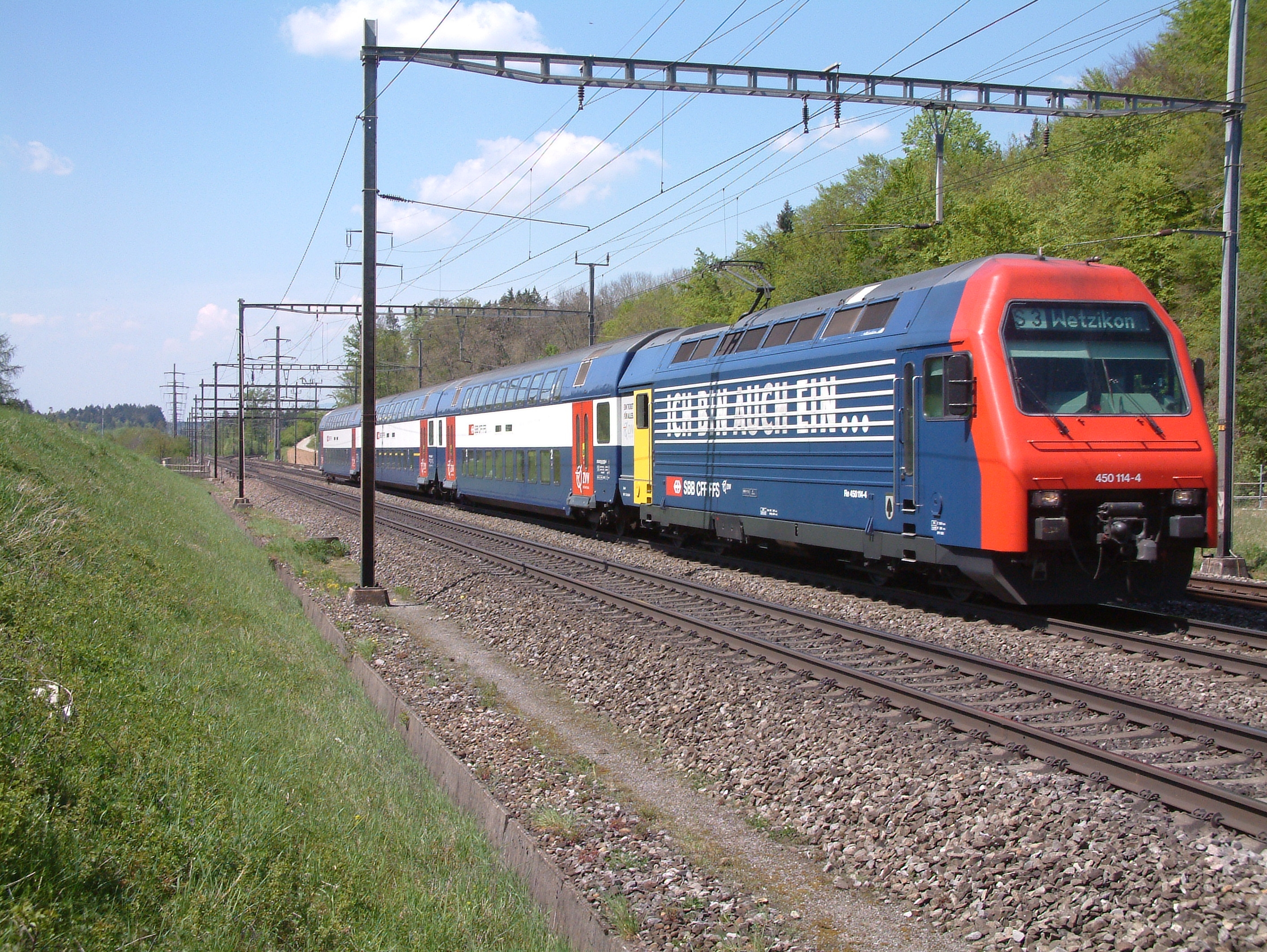
S3 service to Dietlikon, at Hürlistein

=== Effretikon–Winterthur ===
The Effretikon–Winterthur section is the continuation of the route from Zurich via Oerlikon, Wallisellen, Dietlikon, Effretikon and was opened in 1855 by the Northeastern Railway. The line was doubled in 1862. In 1877, the competing Swiss National Railway (Schweizerische Nationalbahn, SNB) built another track next to the existing double track for their line from Baden Oberstadt via Wettingen–Seebach–Kloten to Winterthur. However, due to financial problems, the SNB was compulsorily liquidated in 1878 and the Northeastern Railway took over this company. In 1880, the third track of the former SNB was dismantled.

Today, a third track would be of use, because this route is a bottleneck in the link from Zurich via Winterthur to Ostschweiz and is considered the busiest in Switzerland. To increase the line capacity, there have been many different projects such as quadruplication of the line or construction of the Brütten Tunnel as a continuation of the Airport line from Bassersdorf to Winterthur. However, these efforts have so far failed because financing had not been confirmed in 2010 at the beginning of the preparation of the Strategic Development Rail Infrastructure Program (Strategisches Entwicklungsprogramm Bahninfrastruktur, known as Rail 2030). As a last resort, a three-track upgrade of the line has been completed from Winterthur station to the motorway underpass at Tössmühle. The canton plans a station in Winterthur-Töss. In Winterthur, the line passes under the Storchen Bridge, which is brightly illuminated at night and can be seen by train passengers.

The section is used by all long-distance trains and lines S7, S8, S11, S12, S23, and S24.

Zürich Oerlikon–Kloten/Zurich Airport–Effretikon
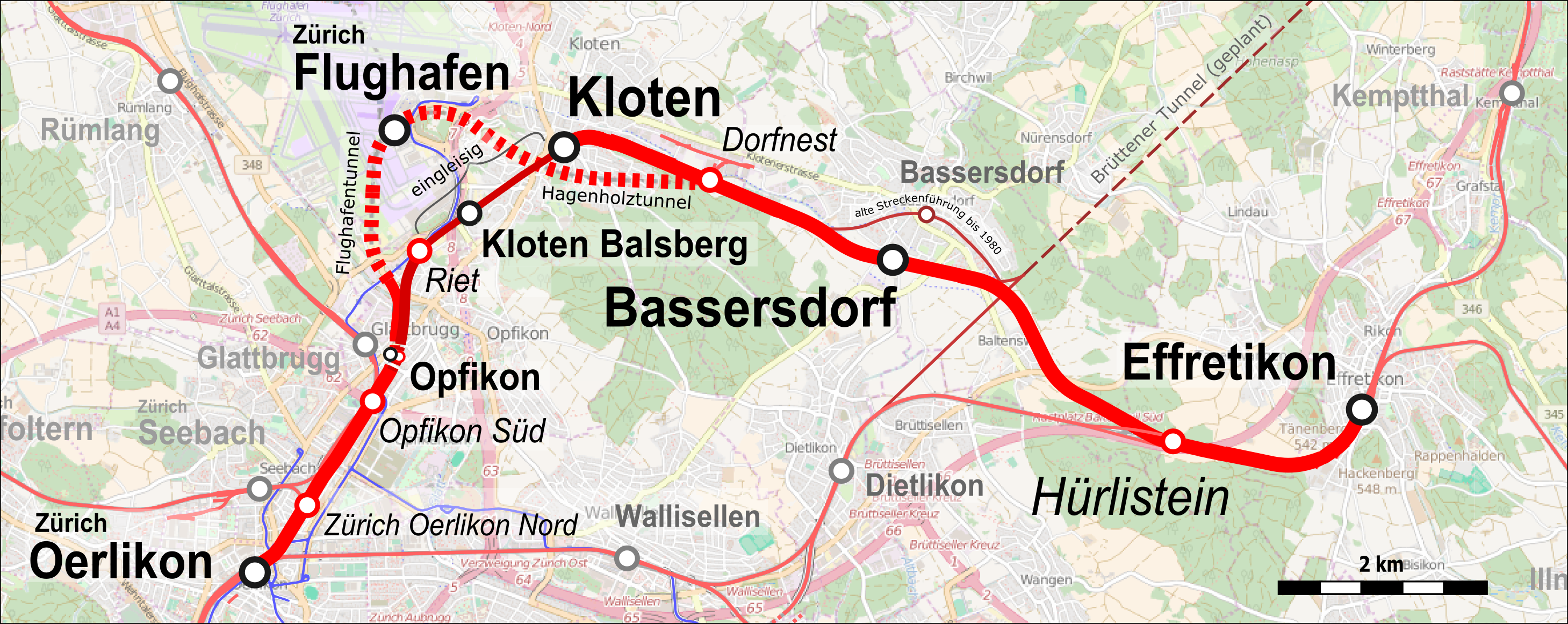

Overview
- Line number: 750

Technical
- Track length: old Kloten line: 14.3 km (8.9 mi); Airport line: 15.6 km (9.7 mi)
- Track gauge: 1,435 mm (4 ft 8 1/2 in)
- Electrification: 15 kV/16.7 Hz AC overhead catenary
- Maximum incline: old Kloten line: Opfikon–Oerlikon: 1.9%; Airport line: Zurich Airport–Oerlikon: 2.5%

=== Oerlikon–Kloten–Bassersdorf ===
The former SNB Bassersdorf–Kloten–Opfikon line was opened in 1877 and electrical operations were introduced on 6 August 1925. Initially, the whole line consisted of a single track, but the section that is also used by the airport line (between Dorfnest junction and Hürlistein junction) was converted to double track with the construction of that line. Bassersdorf station was relocated at the same time. Today the line is served by S7 services. The line at Opfikon was covered over during the duplication of the line in 1977–79 and Opfikon station was built at this point.

=== Airport line (Oerlikon–Bassersdorf–Effretikon) ===
The airport line between Oerlikon and Bassersdorf was inaugurated in 1980. It connects Zurich Airport to the Swiss rail system. Zurich Airport is located below Check-In 3. All long-distance trains between Zurich and Winterthur and S2, S16 (both until Zurich Airport) and S24 services run on this line.

Zürich HB–Stadelhofen–Stettbach–Dübendorf/Dietlikon
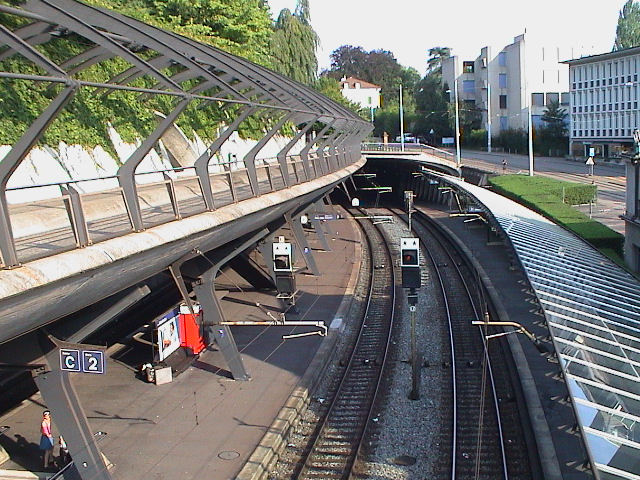
- Stadelhofen station, looking towards Zürichberg Tunnel

Overview
- Line number: 750

Technical
- Line length: 11.1 km (6.9 mi)
- Number of tracks: 2
- Track gauge: 1,435 mm (4 ft 8 1/2 in)
- Electrification: 15 kV/16.7 Hz AC overhead catenary
- Operating speed: 120 km/h (75 mph)
- Maximum incline: Hirschengraben Tunnel, running east near Rämistrasse: 4.0%; Airport line: Zurich Airport–Oerlikon: 2.5%
Route map
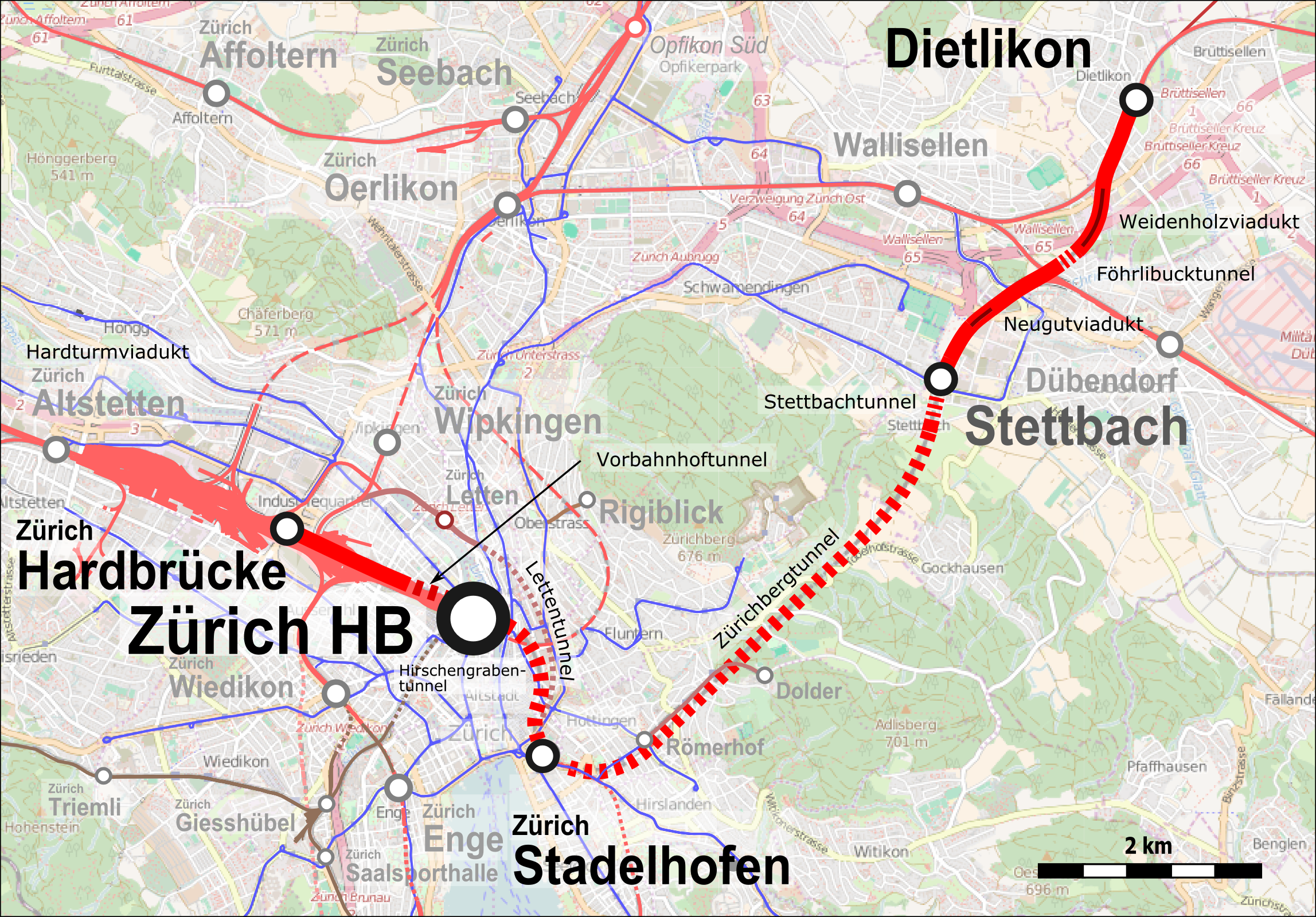
- Source: Swiss railway atlas

=== Zürichberg line (Zürich HB–Stadelhofen–Dietlikon/Dübendorf) ===
This is the real heart of the Zurich S-Bahn, because the whole S-Bahn concept would not have been possible without this new line together with the 4,968-metre (16,299 ft)-long Zürichberg Tunnel and the 2,148-metre (7,047 ft)-long Hirschengraben Tunnel. Together with S-Bahn, the Zürichberg line between Zürich HB and Dietlikon/Dübendorf was opened for scheduled traffic on 27 May 1990. The track is double-track and electrified throughout. Neugut junction, where the line connects to the Wallisellen–Uster–Rapperswil railway, is designed with two single-track bridges so that the trains can branch off without crossing the opposite track. The Zürichberg line is served by lines:

- S3, S11, S12, and S23 towards Dietlikon.
- S5, S9, and S15 branching to the Wallisellen–Uster–Rapperswil railway.
- S6, S7, S16, and S20 until Stadelhofen, continuing to the Lake Zurich right-bank railway line.

=== Altstetten–Zürich HB–Oerlikon diameter line ===
To relieve the burden on the railway node Zurich, the Altstetten–Zürich–Oerlikon cross-city railway was built from 2007 to 2015. The formed with the Weinberg Tunnel a third connection between the Hauptbahnhof and Zurich Oerlikon. Trains on this route stop at the Hauptbahnhof at a new underground section of the station called Löwenstrasse, which is designed as a though station in contrast to the above ground terminus. Löwenstrasse station and the Weinberg tunnel were commissioned for S-Bahn traffic in mid-2014. The bridges between Zurich HB and the Vorbahnhof (a shunting yard) at Zurich Altstetten only went into operation at the end of 2015.

== Proposals ==
There are plans to build a tunnel to overcome the bottleneck between Effretikon and Winterthur. The Brütten Tunnel would run from Bassersdorf to Winterthur. Due to the expected long construction period and high costs, a proposal to upgrade the existing line to at least four tracks has been examined. A similar plan to the Brütten Tunnel proposal was proposed as a popular initiative by the VCS Verkehrs-Club der Schweiz (Swiss Association for Transport and Environment), Zurich, but it was rejected by the voters of the Canton of Zurich on 26 September 2010 with 70% against.

== Operations ==
=== S-Bahn ===
The line is used by 17 S-Bahn lines and three night S-Bahn lines in whole or in part.

- S2 Zürich Flughafen –Oerlikon–Zürich HB–Thalwil–Pfäffikon SZ–Ziegelbrücke
  Stops between Zürich Enge and Ziegelbrücke only in Thalwil, Horgen, Wädenswil, Richterswil, Pfäffikon SZ, Altendorf, Lachen and Siebnen-Wangen.
- S3 (Bülach–) Hardbrücke–Zürich HB–Effretikon–Wetzikon
  Extended from Hardbrücke to Bülach during rush hour, operating non-stop from Glattbrugg.
- S5 Zug–Affoltern am Albis–Zürich HB–Uster–Wetzikon–Rapperswil–Pfäffikon SZ
  Stops between Stadelhofen and Wetzikon only in Uster.
- S6 Baden AG–Regensdorf-Watt–Hardbrücke–Zürich HB–Uetikon
- S7 Winterthur–Kloten–Hardbrücke–Zürich HB–Meilen–Rapperswil
  Operates non stop between Stadelhofen and Meilen, Winterthur and Effretikon, stops in Kemptthal as of 9:20 PM.
- S8 Winterthur–Wallisellen–Oerlikon–Zürich HB–Thalwil–Freienbach SBB-Pfäffikon SZ (–Ziegelbrücke)
  Operates non stop between Winterthur and Effretikon; first and last services extended to Ziegelbrücke.
- S9 (Schaffhausen–) Rafz–Hardbrücke–Zürich HB–Uster
  Operates every 30 minutes between Schaffhausen and Rafz only during rush hour, otherwise every hours.
- S11 Aarau–Lenzburg–Dietikon–Zürich HB–Zürich Stettbach–Winterthur–Seuzach/Sennhof-Kyburg (–Wila)
  Operates non stop between Stettbach and Winterthur; the lines to Seuzach and Sennhof-Kyburg are operated alternately at hourly intervals; supplementary trains to Wila.
- S12 Brugg AG–Zürich HB–Zürich Stettbach– Winterthur–Schaffhausen/Wil SG
  Operates non stop between Stettbach and Winterthur; the lines to Schaffhausen and Wil SG are operated alternately at hourly intervals.
- S14 Affoltern am Albis–Zürich HB–Oerlikon–Uster–Wetzikon–Hinwil
  Operates non stop between Zürich Altstetten and Zürich HB.
- S15 Niederweningen–Hardbrücke–Zürich HB–Uster–Wetzikon–Rapperswil
  Stops between Stadelhofen and Wetzikon only in Uster.
- S16 Zürich Flughafen –Hardbrücke–Zürich HB–Herrliberg-Feldmeilen (–Meilen)
  Extended in the evening to Meilen.
- S19 (Koblenz–Baden–) Dietikon–Zürich HB–Oerlikon–Effretikon (–Pfäffikon ZH )
- S20 Uerikon–Zürich HB–Hardbrücke
  Operates only during rush hour; stops between Männedorf and Stadelhofen only in Meilen and Küsnacht ZH.
- S21 Regensdorf-Watt–Hardbrücke–Zürich HB
  Operates only during rush hour; non-stop between Oerlikon and Regensdorf-Watt; morning services to Zürich HB and evening services to Regensdorf-Wall also stop in Zürich Affoltern.
- S23 Zürich HB–Zürich Stadelhofen–Winterthur–Frauenfeld–Romanshorn
  Operates only during rush hour; morning services to Zürich and evening services to Romanshorn; stops between Stadelhofen and Amriswil only in Winterthur, Frauenfeld, Weinfelden and Sulgen.
- S24 Thayngen/Weinfelden–Winterthur–Zürich Flughafen –Wipkingen–Zürich HB–Thalwil–Zug
  Services stop in Kemptthal until 9:20 PM; the lines to Thayngen and Weinfelden are operated alternately at hourly intervals; stops between Neuhausen and Winterthur only in Andelfingen.
- SN1 Zürich HB – Stadelhofen – Dietlikon – Effretikon – Winterthur (ZVV-Nachtnetz)
- SN5 Bülach – Oerlikon – Zürich HB – Stadelhofen – Dübendorf – Uster – Rüti – Rapperswil (ZVV-Nachtnetz)
- SN7 Stäfa – Meilen – Stadelhofen – Zürich HB – Oerlikon – Kloten – Bassersdorf (ZVV-Nachtnetz)

In addition some additional trains operate in the peak hour.

=== Long-distance traffic ===
In addition to the S-Bahn trains, the route is used by all long-distance trains to Eastern Switzerland. The following daily long-distance trains run on the following routes:

- Intercity 1: Geneva Airport – Bern – Zurich HB – St. Gallen
- Intercity 5: Geneva Airport / Lausanne – Biel/Bienne – Zürich HB (– St. Gallen)
- Intercity 8: Brig – Bern – Zürich HB - Romanshorn
- Interregio 36: Basel SBB – Brugg AG – Zürich HB (– Zurich Airport)
- Interregio 37: Basel SBB – Aarau – Zürich HB – St. Gallen
- Interregio 70: Lucerne – Zürich HB (– Zurich Airport)
- Interregio 75: Zurich HB – Konstanz
- Euro City: (Basel SBB – Aarau – ) Zürich HB – St. Gallen – Memmingen / Kempten – Munich

=== Other traffic ===
The route is used by some freight trains from and to eastern Switzerland.
