= Eduard Schulte =

German resistance member (1891–1966)

Eduard Reinhold Karl Schulte (4 January 1891 in Düsseldorf – 6 January 1966 in Zürich) was a prominent German industrialist. He was one of the first to warn the Allies and tell the world of the Holocaust and systematic exterminations of Jews in Nazi Germany occupied Europe, corroborating the Grojanowski Report.

Whereas the Account of a Forced Gravedigger transmitted in the earliest testimony of mass-execution by gassing in the extermination center Chelmno, the leak by Schulte known as the Riegner Telegram confirmed that plans were being discussed in Fuhrer headquarters to apply this form of murder to all transports and deportations of Jews from Europe.

During World War I, Schulte led the department for soap production within the War Ministry. Due to his career as a manager in the 1920s to 1940s, he had frequent contact with high German government and military officials, as well as other industrialists who had access to important information.

== Giesche’s Erben Company ==
Bergwerksgesellschaft Georg von Giesche's Erben (Giesche's Erben) was a German-owned company and a successor to the huge industrial properties of the aristocratic Giesche family. In 1922, a major part of Giesche's Erben properties located in Silesia were included in the territory of the newly designated Republic of Poland. Giesche's Erben had created Giesche Spolka Akcyjna (Giesche) in order to consolidate Giesche's Erben Polish property and have it registered in Katowice as a Polish business. Giesche was entirely owned by Giesche's Erben. Managing the Polish company became too difficult in part from a high tax being levied by the Polish government that made it very difficult to use German money to pay the expense. So in 1926 a majority share (51%) was sold to the US interests of Anaconda Copper Mining Co. and W. Averell Harriman who had registered the Silesian-American Corporation (SACO) and Silesian Holding Company in Delaware, US. Schulte replaced Carl Besser as the general director of Giesche's Erben.

== Repatriation scheme ==
The new general manager, only 35 years old, had an ambitious plan during the interwar for German re-ownership of the former Giesche Polish properties often referred to as “eastern estates”. He shared in the disdain common with many Germans during the interwar about the loss of territory. To regain it would never be possible as long as the region of Silesia belonged to Poland. Before World War II, the owners and leading managers of Giesche's Erben sought, through a "repatriation scheme", to regain legal control of Giesche through Eduard Schulte, the Giesche's Erben General Manager.

== World War II ==
The German invasion of Poland brought about by 1940 the expelling of all American management of Giesche Corp. and the legal control of the company was delegated to the German military commissar, Dr. Albrecht Jung. Unofficially, all decisions were made by Schulte, who became the real controller of the huge Giesche industrial complex. Schulte and Jung managed many more seized-industrial properties than just that of the Giesche's Erben.

Prior to August 31, 1939, the stock was listed in the stock book of the Silesian-American Corp. in the name of a Zurich, Switzerland-based-corporation subsidiary of Giesche's Erben in Switzerland, Non Ferrum Gesellschaft zur Finanzierung von Unternehmungen des Bergbaus und der Industrie der Nichteisenmetalle (commonly called Non Ferrum). Non Ferrum held the stock for the benefit of Giesche's Erben. Giesche's Erben transferred its SACO stock to Non Ferrum.

Following invasion in 1939, Giesche was among the Polish corporations and companies that were brought under the management of a German military commissar. This action denied SACO all income from the Giesche and they were unable to pay dividends on its outstanding bonds due in 1941. The company had only about half a million dollars in cash. Accordingly, it filed a petition for reorganization under Chapter X of the U.S. Bankruptcy Act.

Just before the entry of the US into the war in 1941, the Swiss bank LaRoche acted jointly with Schulte to establish in Switzerland, Internationale Kapitalanlegen Gesellschaft (Ikap), also a wholly owned subsidiary of Giesche's Erben. It was this corporation that Schulte managed to convince the US owners to sell their part of Giesche but before the sale could be completed a presidential order was issued freezing all financial transactions involving Germany and taking place in Switzerland and would require approval of the US Treasury Department.

In July 1941, the first of three applications seeking Treasury approval was rejected. The German shares were confiscated in November 1942 by the American Alien Property Custodian acting under the Trading with the Enemy Act. On November 17, 1942, the Alien Property Custodian as authorized by the Trading with the Enemy Act took over control of the German-owned shares of the Silesian-American Corp. Schulte's efforts to regain “eastern estates” collapsed.

== The Final Solution ==
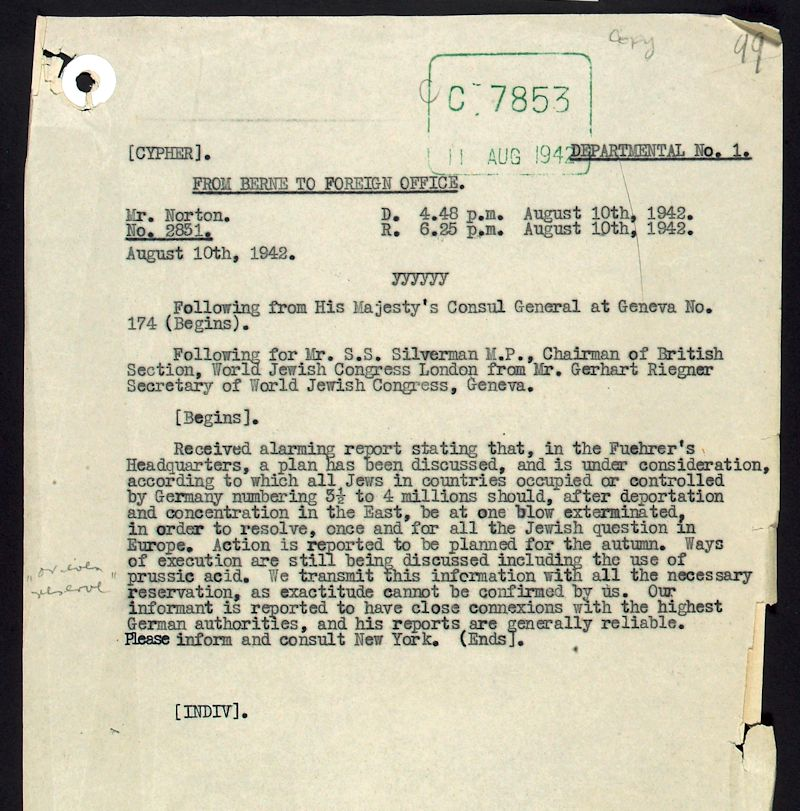
The telegram as described.

Schulte had opportunities to travel often between Breslau in Silesia and Zürich in Switzerland, where he had contacts with Allen W. Dulles, with the dissident German consul Hans Bernd Gisevius, and Polish and French intelligence contacts, according to various sources.

In 1942, Schulte learned about the Final Solution concept, and in July 1942 he told Isidor Koppelman who relayed the information to Gerhart M. Riegner, the Swiss representative of World Jewish Congress. In August 1942, the Riegner Telegram notified the Allies, but they largely ignored the information which stated the estimated number of 3.5 to 4 million Jews, and the planned use of hydrogen cyanide.

In 1943, the Gestapo noticed his activities, and Schulte had to flee permanently to Switzerland with his wife, while his two sons had to remain under German control to fight in the Wehrmacht. One son was killed in the war.

After the war, Schulte remained silent. Riegner always refused to acknowledge who had supplied him with the information as this was "the one request he ever made of me".
