= Kurt Oscar Weber =

- Born: 26 July 1938; Zurich, Switzerland
- Died: 29 October 2011 (aged 73); Basel, Switzerland
- Known for: painting, sculpture
- Movement: German Expressionism, Abstract Expressionism, and Color Field
- Spouse: Colette Leitner (AKA Lindner)
- Website: Official website

Kurt Oscar Weber (26 July 1938 – 29 October 2011) was a Swiss-American fine artist, primarily working in sculpture and painting. He worked in several genres of art including German Expressionism, Abstract Expressionism, Color fielding, and Figuration. He is known for his international solo and group exhibitions primarily presented in the US, France, Switzerland, Austria, and Germany. He maintained studios in Emeryville, California and in Uerikon near Lake Zurich for over 30 years.

== Personal background ==
Kurt O. Weber was born on 26 July 1938 in Zurich, Switzerland. Weber traveled internationally throughout his life. In 1968, he traveled to the US and with his wife, artist Colette Leitner, (AKA Lindner) began a 13-year adventure exploring the country. In 1970, he became a US citizen, while simultaneously maintaining his Swiss citizenship. During this period, he continued his artwork, which primarily included sketching and drafting ideas. Following their exploration across the US, which ended in 1981, Weber divorced and moved to the western US. Arriving in California, Weber set up a studio in Emeryville, located in the San Francisco Bay area. It was here that he created his first large-format images.

Later on, he would commute back and forth between America and Europe, which continued until the 1990s when he temporarily took up residence in Basel. Following the separation from his second wife, he switched his primary residence back to San Francisco. While maintaining a studio in California, he continued to travel to Paris and Switzerland on a regular basis. It wasn't until 2009, that Weber exhibited his art in his native city of Zurich for the first time.

In Paris, during the growing environment of the existentialism, Weber met Jean-Paul Sartre and Alberto Giacometti. He formed a lifelong friendship with the Giacometti, who advised him to develop and maintain ownership and independence of his artistic style and expression, apart from the influence and control of the artistic community that would seek to define his work based on the desires and artistic direction of others. To that end, Weber continued to develop new techniques and painting processes, which included the use of mixed media, pigments, and bright, vibrant colors on various canvasses and placement boards.

In 1964, with the encouragement of Giacometti, Weber traveled to New York, where the avant garde movement had been developing and coming to prominence on a global scale. While intrigued by the creative expression of the abstract painters he encountered in New York, he was drawn to the historic monuments of the Mayas and the Aztecs and began traveling to Mexico regularly. It was this combination of experiences - the breadth and spatiality of American abstract painting and Mexico's luminous colors that moved Weber to a radical new start.

== Educational background ==
Weber's professional training was varied and included studying with world-renowned artists throughout Europe. He attended the Kunstgewerbeschule (School of Applied Arts) in Vienna, Switzerland, from 1955 through 1958. The school was a highly progressive school that offered an education that focused primarily on architecture, furniture, crafts, and modern design. While Vienna's Academy of Fine Art was considered more prestigious and traditional, the education at Kunstgewerbeschule was dominated by instructors of the Vienna Secession.

Following the completion of his education at Kunstgewerbeschule, Weber relocated to Paris, where he studied sculpture and painting under the guidance of André Lhôte, founder of the Académie d'Art in Montparnasse. Afterwards, Weber went to Italy to study the famous murals and wall paintings created by Italian Renaissance painters. After completing initial studies of the Italian frescoes, Weber moved to Salzburg, Austria, where he studied with Oskar Kokoschka, founder of the Schule des Sehens (School of Seeing). He additionally studied at the École des Beaux-Arts in Zurich and the Académie de peinture et de sculpture (Royal Academy of Painting and Sculpture) in Paris. He and studied lithography and etching with Stanley Hayter in Paris.

== Influences ==
André L’Hôte was not only a professor but also a significant influence on Weber's early emerging talent. Fernand Léger, also contributed to Weber in his early years. As Weber's work matured the classic influences of Andrea Montegna, Caravaggio, Pierro Della Francesca, and Fra Angelica are evident. He received the greatest inspiration in his professional career from Alberto Giacometti and Pablo Picasso.

== Personal style ==
Weber's oeuvre consists of four distinct genres: Late German Expressionism, which reveals his close scrutiny of Max Beckmann, E. L. Kirchner, and Emile Nolde. Abstract Expressionist works salute Jackson Pollock, Conrad Marca-Relli, Arshille Gorky, and Philip Guston. Figuration nods to Eric Fischl and Egon Schiele. Weber's expansive Colorfields reflect his respect for fellow Bay Area artist, Richard Diebenkorn, as well as Helen Frankenthaler, Ad Reinhardt, and Barnett Newman.

== Death ==
Weber died in Basel, Switzerland on 29 October 2011. At the time of his death, he had perfected a previously undeveloped painting technique and process which allowed brilliant inks and pigment to adhere to translucent vellum. His last collective series encompassed the perfecting of this technique, which he referred to as Clusters. Following his death, an exhibition of a retrospective collection of Weber's life and work from 1960 through 2009 was presented at the Sammlung Gallerie S/Z in Zurich, running from June through August 2012. Another retrospective presentation of his work, entitled Remember, was presented in 2012 at the Galerie Lilian Andrée, Riehen, in the canton of Basel-Stadt in Switzerland.

== Exhibitions ==
Solo exhibitions

- 1965: Workshop Gallery, Studio East, New York
- 1971: Valley House Gallery, Dallas, Texas
- 1981: Retrospektive in der Galerie Inter Art Basel, Switzerland
- 1985: Galerie Stella Polaris, Los Angeles, California
- 1986: Galerie Hatley Martin, San Francisco, California
- 1988: Galerie Hatley Martin, San Francisco, California
- 1991: Galerie et Edition Lilian Andrée, Basel, Switzerland
- 1992: Galerie Hilt, Basel, Switzerland
- 1994: Centre d'Art d'Ivry, Galerie Fernand Léger, with catalogue (77 MB) Paris
- 1995: Galerie Marie-Louise Wirth, Zurich, Switzerland
- 1999: Kurt Weber: Retrospective, Le Coq Rouge, Lörrach, Germany
- 2002: Galerie Lilian Andrée, Basel, Switzerland
- 2004: Ambassade Suisse, Paris
- 2005: Galerie Lilian Andrée, Basel, Switzerland
- 2009: Sammlung Galerie S/Z, Zurich, Switzerland
- 2010: Southern Landmarks, Sammlung Galerie S/Z, Zurich, Switzerland

Group exhibitions

- 1962: Salon de Mai, Musée d'Art Moderne, Paris
- 1963: Salon de la jeune Peinture, Musée d'Art Moderne, Paris
- 1973: Galerie Troup, Texas
- 1986: First Emeryville Annual, San Francisco, California
- 1989: The Western National Annual, The Brooklyn Museum, New York
- 2000: Yellow: The First Color, Bedford Gallery, San Francisco, California
- 2003: Galerie Darthea Speyer, Paris, France
