= Gerhart M. Riegner =

Jewish activist (1911–2001)

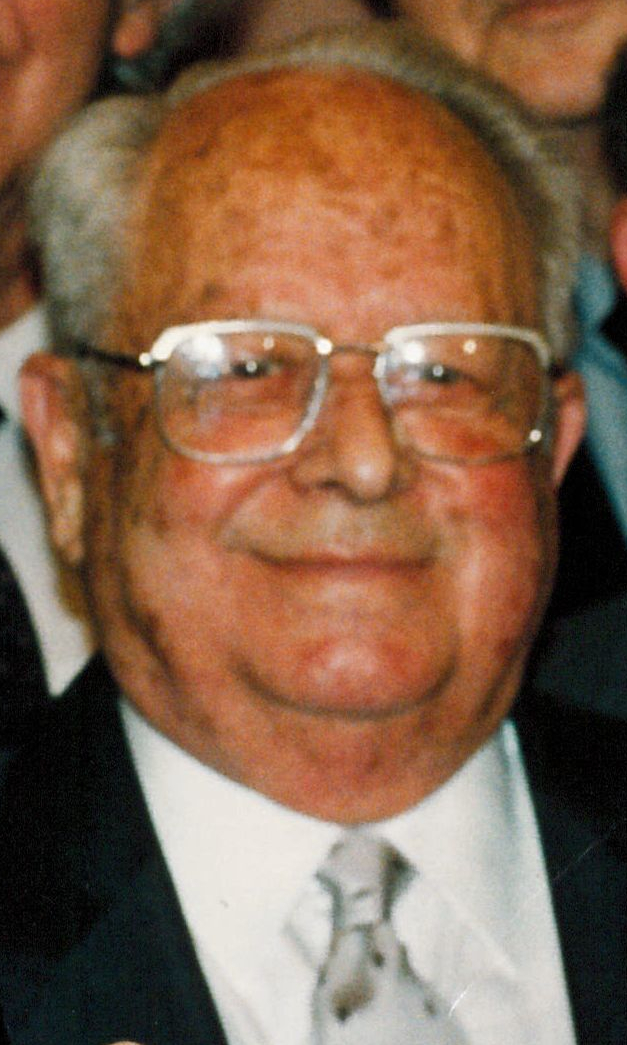
- Riegner in 1993

Gerhart Moritz Riegner (September 12, 1911 in Berlin – December 3, 2001 in Geneva) was a German philosopher, and the secretary-general of the World Jewish Congress from 1965 to 1983. He studied law in Heidelberg, Paris and at the Geneva Graduate Institute.

== Life ==
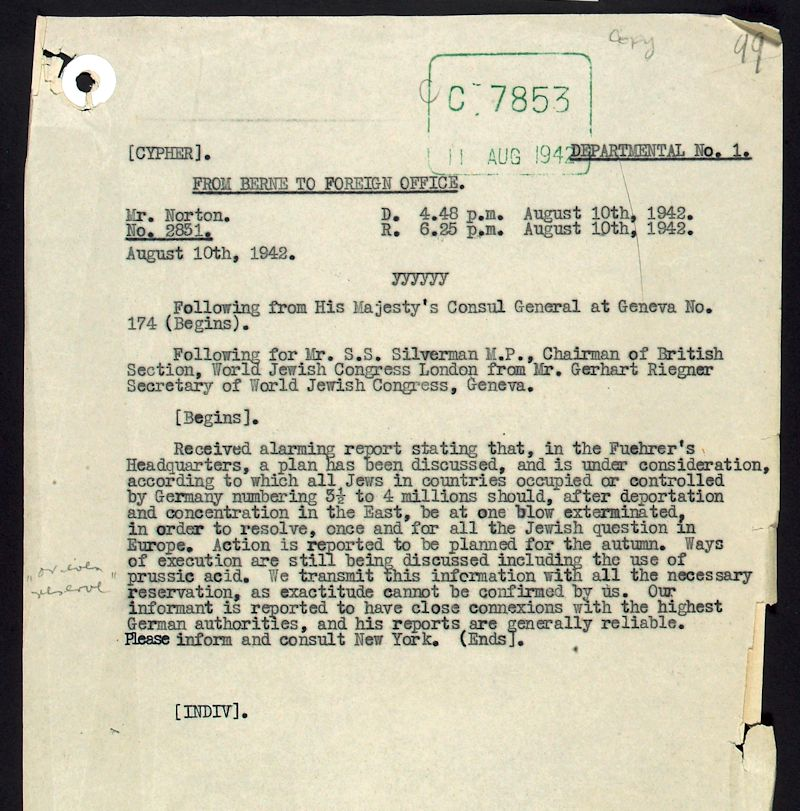
The telegram as described.

On August 8, 1942, Riegner sent a telegram through diplomatic channels to Stephen Samuel Wise, president of the World Jewish Congress. However, Wise did not receive it until the end of the month. The source of the information was Eduard Schulte, the anti-Nazi chief executive officer of the prominent German company Giesche (part of Silesian-American Corporation) that employed high-level Nazi officials.

His telegram was the first official communication about the planned Holocaust. It read in part:

"Received alarming report stating that, in Fuehrer's headquarters, a plan has been discussed and is under consideration according to which all Jews in countries occupied or controlled Germany numbering 3½ to 4 millions should, after deportation and concentration in East, be at one blow exterminated in order to resolve, once and for all the Jewish question in Europe."

== Awards and honors ==
In 1994 he received the Four Freedoms Award for the Freedom of Worship

In 2001 Riegner received an Honorary Doctorate from the University of Lucerne.
