= Paul Vogt (pastor) =

Swiss pastor and theologian (1900–1984)

Paul Vogt (May 23, 1900 – March 12, 1984) was a Swiss Protestant pastor and theologian. He founded Freiplatzaktion, an organization providing assistance to refugees and migrants, and was instrumental in first releasing news about the Holocaust to the public, including in the United States, during World War II.

== Early life ==
Vogt was born in Stafa to Johannes Daniel Paul Vogt, a minister who had migrated from Silesia. He was educated at the Evangelical College in Schiers, graduating in 1922; he was subsequently, till 1926, a post-graduate student of theology in Basel, Zürich and Tübingen. He served first at the Neumünster in Zürich, and then as parish priest in Ellikon an der Thur (where he married Sophie Brenner in 1927), before moving in 1929 to Walzenhausen. He showed an early interest in the creation of social institutions, founding a relief organisation for the unemployed in the canton of Appenzell and building a social centre and residence for the homeless in Walzenhausen called 'Sonneblick' that exists to this day.

In 1936, Vogt left Walzenhausen for a pastorate in Zürich-Seebach, and was appointed leader of the Swiss Protestant Relief Organization for the Confessional Church in Germany (SEHBKD). At the same time, he also co-founded the Swiss Central Office for Refugee Aid (SZF). Between 1933 and 1947, various relief organizations associated with SZF paid out about 70 million Swiss francs to support refugees from the Nazis, especially Jews.

== World War II and the Holocaust ==
In 1943, he took over the refugee office established by the Swiss Evangelical Church Federation, the Protestant-Reformed Landeskirche of the canton of Zürich and the Swiss Ecclesiastical Auxiliary Committee for Evangelical Refugees and thereafter became known as the "Pastor to the Refugees". By that time he was already a very popular preacher and respected theologian. In the fall of 1942, he set up Freiplatzaktion ("Free Place Action") to house 1,700 refugees in private homes free of charge.

News about "deportations to the East" as part of the Final Solution had reached Switzerland by 1942, and the government had chosen to respond by tightening border controls and ramping up censorship. Gerhard Riegner, the secretary of the World Jewish Congress in Geneva, and Recha and Yitzchak Sternbuch, of the Va'ad Hatzalah (Orthodox Rescue Committee) in Switzerland, sent in August and September 1942 telegrams to United States Jewish leadership warning of firm Nazi plans to annihilate European Jewry, and some reports about deportations and murders in the camps had begun to appear in the local media. In response, Vogt declared October 1 a day of prayer for Jewish victims of Nazism. He especially emphasized "what we in Switzerland are in a position to know, and ought to know, about the fate of the Jews of France". The October 1942 issue of his magazine warned: "A vast pall of death has settled over God's people, the Jewish people... Europe is filled with the screams of the dying as they are shot or gassed."

Since harsh censorship of the Swiss press by the government did not extend to the Church, Vogt took up the task of publicising Nazi atrocities through sermons, his magazine, and the reproduction of smuggled photographs, which he viewed as his duty as the "voice of the silent and the emissary of the hunted". He particularly attacked the Swiss policy of "refoulement", by which Jewish refugees at the border were handed back to German authorities and near-certain execution.

In 1944, First Secretary of El Salvador mission in Switzerland, George Mantello (Mandel, a Hungarian Orthodox Jew from Romania), received from Romanian diplomat Florian Manilou two reports about the deportations of Hungarian Jews. One was likely a version of the Auschwitz Protocols, including the Vrba–Wetzler report, the first detailed insider information about the operation of the Auschwitz-Birkenau extermination camp. Manilou stopped off in Budapest, against strict Nazi orders, on the way back from Romania and obtained the reports from Moshe Krausz who received them from Rabbi Michael Dov Weissmandl, co-leader of the Bratislava Working Group. Manilou broke the sad news to Mantello that his family in Romania was murdered by the Nazis. Despite his grief, within 24 hours Mantello arranged to have key abstract of the report on the atrocities sent out via international wire service. This and activism by Pastor Vogt and others led to major grass roots protests in Switzerland: street protests, sermons in Protestant churches and an intense Press Campaign of over 400 glaring headlines (contravening strict Swiss censorship rules) publicizing Europe's twentieth century Dark Age and barbarism.

Pastor Vogt arranged within a few days, through his refugee organization, for thousands of copies of the reports to be made and distributed. He then preached a series of sermons, subsequently published, on the horror of Nazi actions and the complicity of the Hungarian and Swiss governments. One section, quoting Genesis 4:9-10, was noted and repeated in sermons across Switzerland:

Then the Lord said to Cain, "Where is your brother Abel?"

"I don't know,” he replied. "Am I my brother’s keeper?"

The Lord said, “What hast thou done? Behold! Your brother’s blood cries out to me from the earth Behold, thy brothers blood cries out to me from the earth." Today, God's scrutinizing and inquiring eyes are focused upon us Christians. And He demands of us, Where, where, where! Where is your brother, the homeless Jew? ... Where are the homeless Jewish children today?

The sermons and the Auschwitz reports were collected into a book, called 'Am I My Brother's Keeper" (Soll ich meines Bruders Hütter sein?"), which included a foreword by Vogt in which he said: "Through these factual accounts, the Christian community is being called to total repentance... We have to be cleansed of any trace of anti-Semitism. In view of the millions of murdered Jews, any further anti-Semitic thought and any mean word is criminal madness."

Vogt's copies of the reports fell into the hands of the Zürich correspondent of The New York Times, Daniel T. Brigham, who wrote two reports in early July on their contents, which represented the first detailed public news stories on the scale of the Holocaust and the functioning of Auschwitz-Birkenau. The first report was titled "Inquiry Confirms Nazi Death Camps", with the subheading "1,715,000 Jews Said to Have Been Put to Death by the Germans Up to April 15". The second was titled "Two Death Camps Places of Horror; German Establishments for Mass Killings of Jews Described by Swiss."

Responding to a letter of thanks from Mantello, Vogt wrote: "We would like to apply all our strength to fight these dreadful things, in order to awaken the [world's] conscience to save those who are still under threat." Vogt ensured that every church in Basel and Zürich named the Hungarian Jews—still being deported—as needing intervention.

The intense Press Campaign, street protests, Sunday sermons led to great pressure on the Hungarian government by President Roosevelt, Prime Minister Churchill and others. It was one of the main factors forcing Hungary's Regent Miklós Horthy to stop the transports to Auschwitz. This allowed for large number of Hungarian Jews to be rescued - many by Swiss diplomat Carl Lutz, Swedish diplomat Raoul Wallenberg and other diplomats in Budapest.

== After the War ==
After the war, Vogt campaigned for ecumenical understanding between Christians and Jews, founding in 1945 a "working group of Christians and Jews", and became a prominent member of the Society Switzerland-Israel. In 1947, he was awarded an honorary doctorate by the University of Zurich for his services to refugees. From 1947 Vogt was pastor in Grabs; in 1951 he was appointed dean of the parish chapter Rheintal-Werdenberg-Sargans, and between 1952 and 1957 was president of the Protestant educational institution Schiers-Samedan. After he retired from the Church in 1965 as pastor of Degersheim, Vogt lived in Grüsch in Prättigau, until he moved in 1982 before his wife's death to a retirement home in Zizers, where he died in 1984.
