= Männedorf railway station =

Railway station in Switzerland

Männedorf
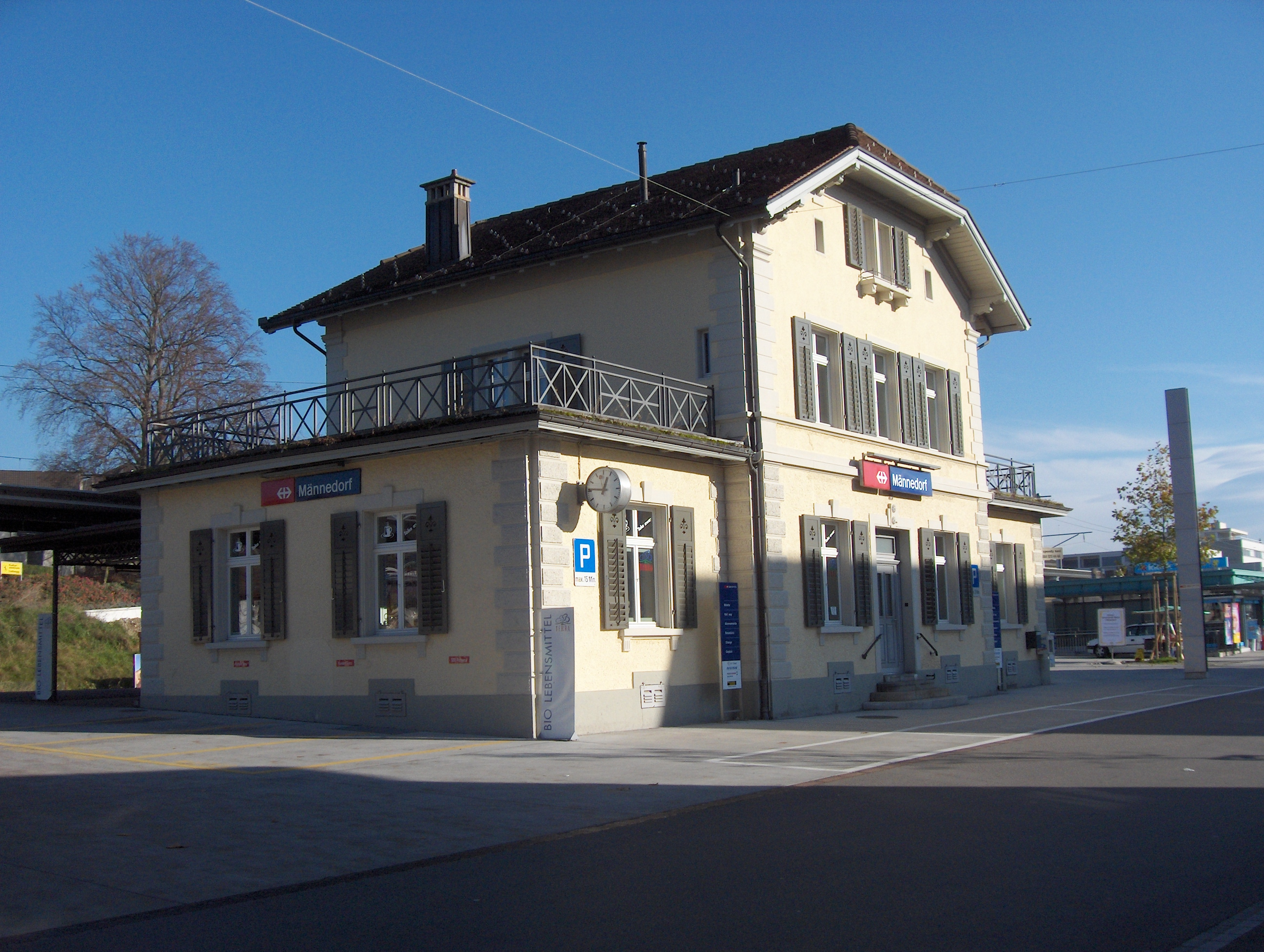

General information
- Location: Bahnhofstrasse, Männedorf, Canton of Zurich, Switzerland
- Coordinates: 47.253474°N 8.692353°E
- Elevation: 419 m (1,375 ft)
- Owner: Swiss Federal Railways
- Operator: Swiss Federal Railways
- Line: Lake Zurich right bank line
- Platforms: 1 side platform
- Tracks: 1
- Connections: ZVV
- Ship: ZSG passenger ships
- Bus: VZO bus routes 925 940

Other information
- Fare zone: ZVV 142

Services
Preceding station	Zurich S-Bahn	Following station
Uetikon towards Winterthur	S7	Stäfa towards Rapperswil
Meilen towards Zürich Hardbrücke	S20 Limited service	Stäfa towards Uerikon
Uetikon towards Bassersdorf	SN7 Limited service	Stäfa Terminus
Location
- Location within Switzerland Location within Canton of Zürich

Männedorf is a railway station in the Swiss canton of Zurich, situated in the municipality of Männedorf on the eastern shore of Lake Zurich (Goldcoast). The station is located on the Lake Zurich right bank railway line, within fare zone 142 of the Zürcher Verkehrsverbund (ZVV).

== Services ==
=== Rail ===
As of the December 2024 timetable change, the station is served by the following S-Bahn trains:

- Zurich S-Bahn:
  - S7 Winterthur–Kloten–Hardbrücke–Zürich HB–Meilen–Rapperswil
    Operates non stop between Stadelhofen and Meilen, Winterthur and Effretikon, stops in Kemptthal as of 9:20 PM.
  - S20 Uerikon–Zürich HB–Hardbrücke
    Operates only during rush hour; stops between Männedorf and Stadelhofen only in Meilen and Küsnacht ZH.

During weekends (Friday and Saturday nights), there is also a nighttime S-Bahn service (SN7) offered by ZVV.

- Nighttime S-Bahn (only during weekends):
  - SN7: hourly service between Bassersdorf and Stäfa (via Zürich HB)

=== Bus ===
A regional bus stop is adjacent to the railway station, served by buses of the Verkehrsbetriebe Zürichsee und Oberland (VZO).

=== Boat ===
Passenger ships of the Zürichsee-Schifffahrtsgesellschaft (ZSG) operate from a lakeside terminal located a short distance southwest of the railway station. The boats operate either in direction to Zurich Bürkliplatz or Rapperswil/Schmerikon, serving the terminals of several lakeside towns and Ufenau island en route.

== See also ==
- Rail transport in Switzerland
