= Ringelblum Archive =

Collection of documents from the WWII Warsaw Ghetto

- Compiled by Oyneg Shabbos group
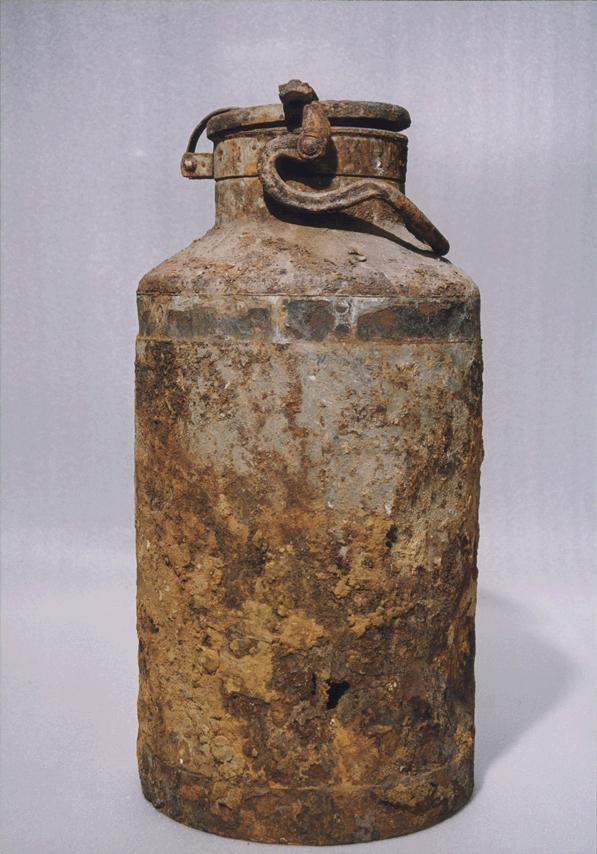
One of the milk cans used to hide documents. From the Ringelblum "Oyneg Shabbos" Archive

The Ringelblum Archive is a collection of documents from the World War II Warsaw Ghetto, collected and preserved by a group known by the codename Oyneg Shabbos (in Modern Israeli Hebrew, Oneg Shabbat; Hebrew: עונג שבת), led by Jewish historian Emanuel Ringelblum. The group, which included historians, writers, rabbis, and social workers, was dedicated to chronicling life in the Ghetto during the German occupation. They worked as a team, collecting documents and soliciting testimonies and reports from dozens of volunteers of all ages. The materials submitted included essays, diaries, drawings, wall posters, and other materials describing life in the Ghetto. The archive assembly began in September 1939 and ended in January 1943; the material was buried in the ghetto in three caches.

After the war, two of the three caches were recovered, and the re-discovered archive, containing about 6,000 documents (some 35,000 pages), is preserved in the Jewish Historical Institute, Warsaw.

== Etymology ==
The name Oneg Shabbat means joy of the Sabbath in Hebrew and usually refers to a celebratory gathering held after Sabbath services, often with food, singing, study, discussion, and socializing. This name was selected because the group tended to meet on Shabbat to discuss the progress of their collection and documentation efforts. The form Oyneg Shabbos is Ashkenazic pronunciation.

== History ==
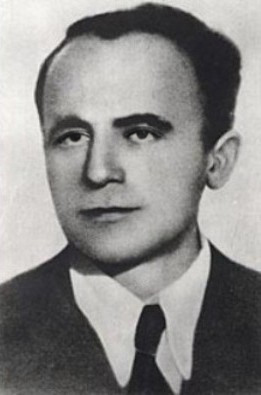
Emanuel Ringelblum, who initiated the project, and after whom the collection is also called the "Ringelblum Archives"

The members of Oyneg Shabbos initially collected the material with the intention that they would write a book after the war about the horrors they had witnessed. The Warsaw Ghetto was sealed on November 16, 1940. As the pace of deportations increased, and it became clear that the destination was the Treblinka death camp and few Jewish Varsovians were likely to survive, Ringelblum had the archives stored in three milk cans and ten metal boxes, which were then buried in three places in the Ghetto.

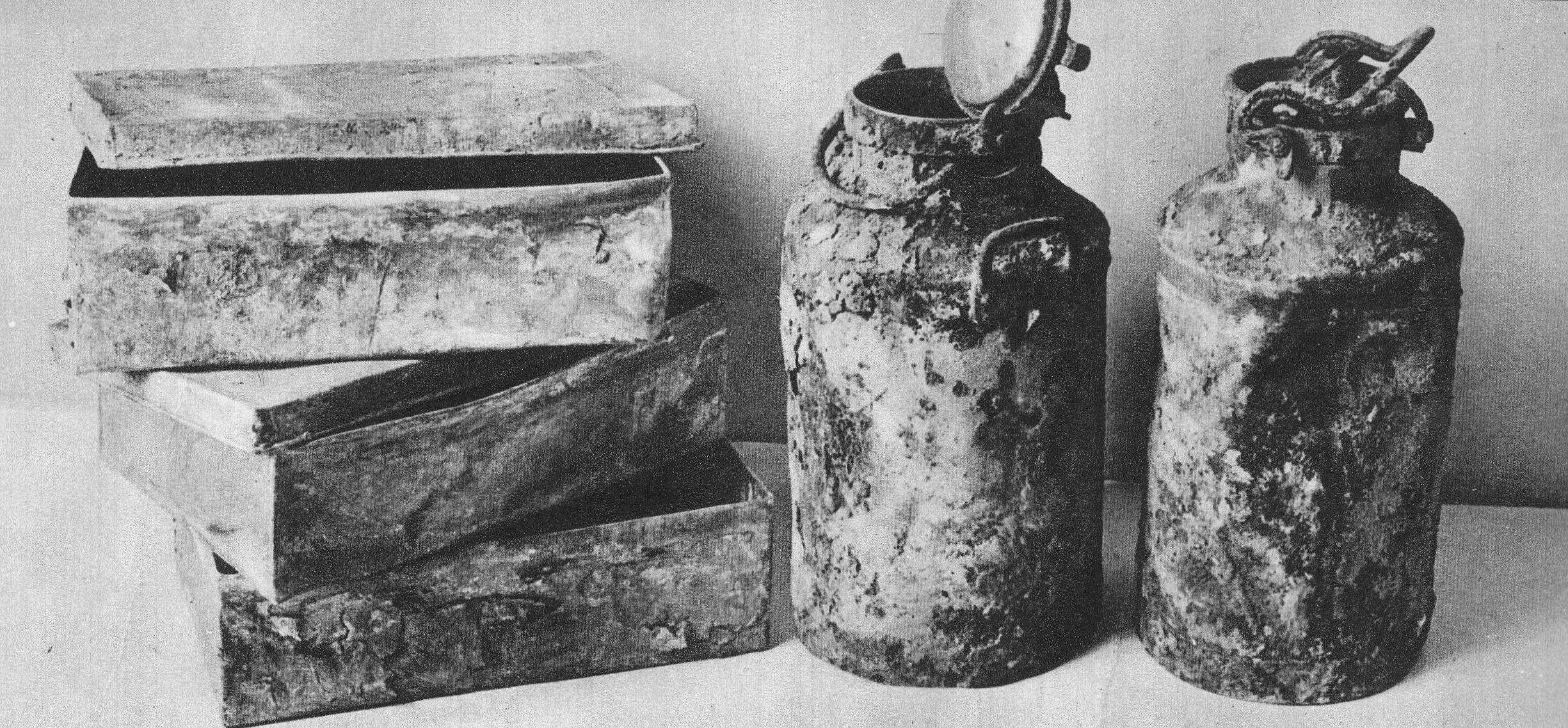
Three boxes and two milk cans used to store the archive

On January 19, 1942, an escaped inmate from the Chełmno extermination camp, Szlama Ber Winer, reached the Warsaw Ghetto, where he gave detailed information about the camp to the Oneg Shabbat group. His report, which became known as the Grojanowski Report, was smuggled out of the ghetto through the channels of the Polish underground, reached London and was published by June.

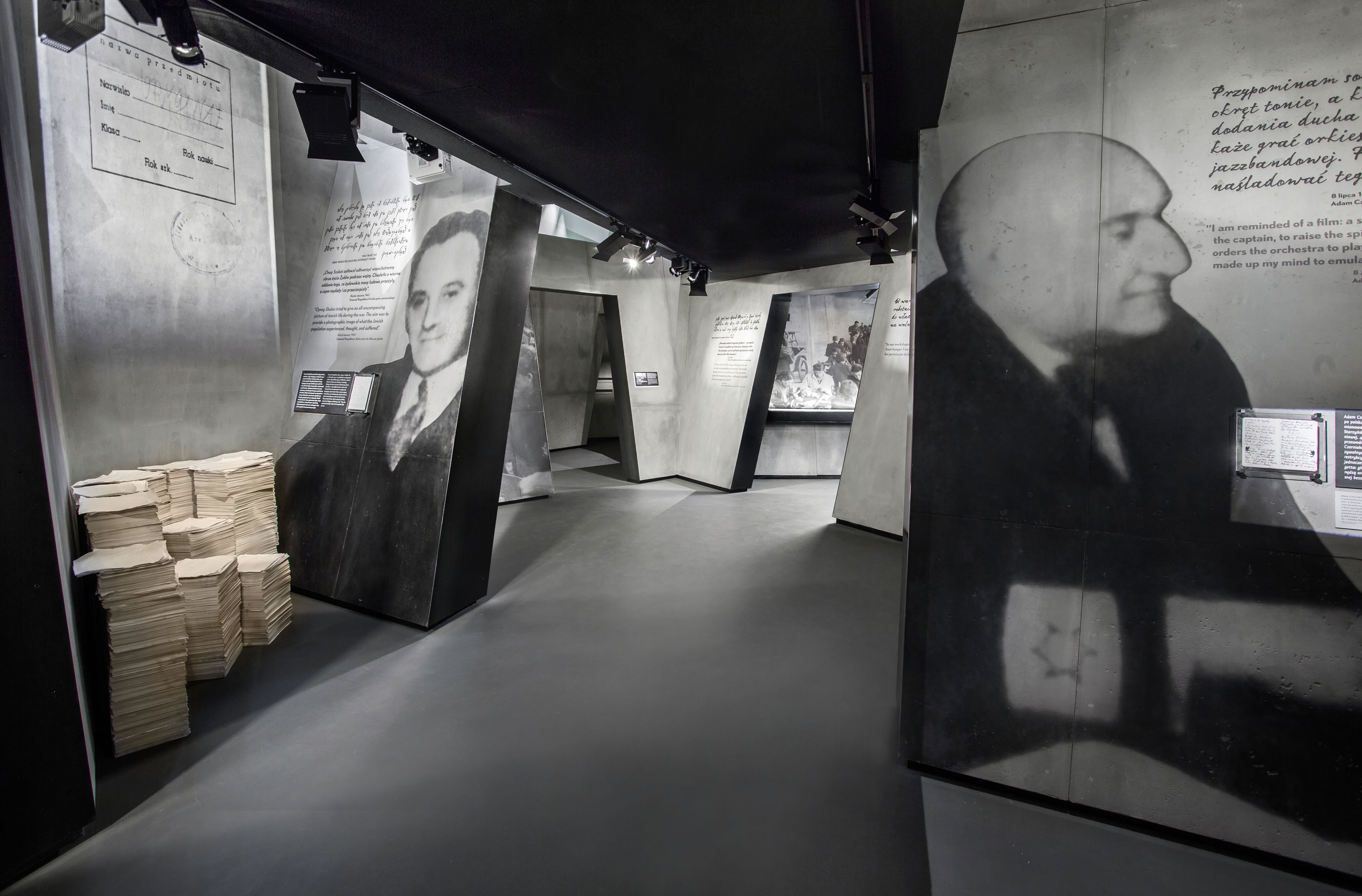
Part of permanent exhibition at the Museum of the History of Polish Jews dedicated to Oyneg Shabbos.

All but three members of the Oyneg Shabbos were murdered in the genocides. Emanuel Ringelblum escaped the ghetto but continued to return to work on the archives. In 1944 Ringelblum and his family were discovered and were executed along with those who hid them.

After the war, Rokhl Auerbakh, one of the three surviving members of Oyneg Shabes, initiated the search for the buried chronicles. Two of the canisters, containing thousands of documents, were unearthed on September 18, 1946, and a further ten boxes on December 1, 1950. The third cache was thought to be buried beneath what is now the Chinese Embassy in Warsaw but a search in 2005 failed to find the missing archival material. The recovered archives are now preserved in the Jewish Historical Institute, Warsaw. The archive preserves the 323-page testimony of Jakub Krzepicki (units ARG II 378 and ARG II 382), recorded by Rachel Auerbach between December 1942 and March 1943 after Krzepicki's escape from Treblinka; it includes a plan of the camp drawn by Krzepicki himself and is among the earliest detailed accounts of the camp's operation.

== Legacy ==
In 1960, students of Rabbi Kalonymus Kalman Shapira, The Piaseczno Rebbe, published the Aish Kodesh which were derashos on the parsha that the rebbe had delivered between September 1939 and July 1942 in the Warsaw Ghetto and which were discovered with the Ringelblum Archive.

In 1999, the Emanuel Ringelblum Archives were listed by UNESCO on the Memory of the World international register.

A catalog of the Ringelblum Archive was published in book form in 2009 by the United States Holocaust Memorial Museum and the Jewish Historical Institute, Warsaw; and the entire archive is also available to researchers in digital format at both institutions. The Jewish Historical Institute has published a book series summarizing parts of the archive. The first ten volumes are: (1) Letters concerning the Holocaust (2) Children — covert teaching in the Warsaw Ghetto (3) Accounts from Kresy (4) Life and work of Gela Seksztajn (5) The Warsaw Ghetto. Everyday Life (6) The General Governorate. Accounts and Documents (7) Legacies (8) Territories annexed to the Reich: The Reich District of Danzig-West Prussia, Ciechanów district, Upper Silesia (9) Territories annexed to the Reich: Wartheland (10) Fate of Jews from Łódź (1939–1942).

In 2007, historian Samuel Kassow published Who Will Write Our History? Emanuel Ringelblum, the Warsaw Ghetto, and the Oyneg Shabes Archive listing all accounts of the Oyneg Shabes archives that have been found. In 2019, a documentary film directed by Roberta Grossman about the Ringelblum Archive, based on Kassow's book Who Will Write Our History?, was released.
