= Rokhl Auerbakh =

Yiddish and Polish author (1903–1976)

- רחל אוירבך
- Born: Rokhl Eiga Auerbakh; December 18, 1903; Lanovtsy, Volhynian Governorate, Russian Empire
- Died: May 31, 1976 (aged 72); Tel Aviv, Israel
- Education: Graduate degree in philosophy and general history, Jan Kazimierz University, Lviv
- Occupations: Writer, historian, Holocaust scholar
- Writing career
- Language: Polish, Yiddish

Rokhl Auerbakh (Note: also spelled Rokhl Oyerbakh and Rachel Auerbach) (Hebrew: רחל אוירבך, Polish: Rachela Auerbach; 18 December 1903 – 31 May 1976) was an Israeli writer, essayist, historian, Holocaust scholar, and Holocaust survivor. She wrote prolifically in both Polish and Yiddish, focusing on prewar Jewish cultural life and postwar Holocaust documentation and witness testimonies. She was one of the three surviving members of the covert Oyneg Shabes group led by Emanuel Ringelblum that chronicled daily life in the Warsaw Ghetto, and she initiated the excavation of the group's buried manuscripts after the war. In Israel, she directed the Department for the Collection of Witness Testimony at Yad Vashem from 1954 to 1968.

== Early life and education ==
Rokhl Eiga Auerbakh was born in Lanovtsy (today Lanivtsi), in the Volhynian Governorate of the Russian Empire (present-day Ukraine) to Khanina Auerbakh and his wife Mania (née Kimelman). At a young age, she and her family moved to Lviv. She had one brother who died in 1935; her parents also died before World War II.

Auerbakh attended the Adam Mickewicz Gymnasium in Lviv and completed her graduate studies at the Jan Kazimierz University in the fields of philosophy and general history.

== Interwar years ==
Auerbakh began her writing career in 1925 as a journalist for Chwila, a Polish Zionist daily newspaper published in Lviv. In the second half of the decade she worked for the Morgen Yiddish daily newspaper as an editor and writer. Between 1929 and 1930 she edited a literary column in a weekly published by the Poalei Zion movement. She was an editor of Tsushtayer, a Yiddish literary journal, and coeditor and contributor to Yidish, another Galician journal that emphasized the cultural movement.

Relocating to Warsaw in 1903, she was a frequent contributor to the leading Yiddish and Polish newspapers and literary journals of the day. She wrote on "Polish and Yiddish literature, education, psychology, folklore, art, linguistics and theater", and paid special attention to Yiddish and Polish women writers and authors.

== War years ==
During the German occupation of Poland, Auerbakh was interned in the Warsaw Ghetto. She overtly worked as the director of a soup kitchen and covertly as a member of the secret Oyneg Shabes group organized by Emanuel Ringelblum, which recruited historians, writers, rabbis, and social workers to chronicle daily life in the ghetto. Auerbakh kept a diary in Polish and also wrote a vivid account titled "Two Years in the Ghetto", which described the pervasive hunger that she witnessed. She interviewed and transcribed the testimony of Jacob Krzepicki, an escapee from the Treblinka extermination camp, between December 28, 1942, and March 7, 1943. Between 28 December 1942 and 7 March 1943, Auerbach recorded the 323-page testimony of Jakub Krzepicki, a Jewish prisoner who had escaped from the Treblinka extermination camp; the account, preserved in the Ringelblum Archive (units ARG II 378 and ARG II 382), is one of the earliest detailed descriptions of the camp's operation.

Auerbakh escaped from the Warsaw Ghetto on March 9, 1943, and worked on the Aryan side as a Polish secretary, aided by her "non-Jewish" appearance and fluency in the German language. By night, she continued recording her historical notes of Jews at that time. At the request of an underground Jewish committee, she wrote "Yizkor", a lengthy essay about the summer 1942 Warsaw Ghetto deportation, and another piece recounting the lives of "Jewish writers, artists and cultural activists in Warsaw", both of which were widely circulated underground. "Yizkor", the only one of her works to be translated into English, featured themes that would appear frequently in the books she wrote after the war, including "the importance of the culture that was destroyed; the humanity and specific identity of the victims; the responsibility to remember; and the difficulty of finding appropriate words to convey the enormity of the loss". At one point Auerbakh was spotted writing at night by candlelight and gave her manuscripts for safekeeping to Dr. Jan Żabiński, director of the Warsaw Zoo. Żabiński, who was recognised as Righteous Among the Nations, buried them on the zoo grounds and she retrieved them after the war.

At war's end, Auerbakh was one of only three surviving members of the Oyneg Shabes group. She initiated the search for and excavation of the documents buried by the group in the Warsaw Ghetto, which yielded the Ringelblum Archive.

== Postwar ==
Auerbakh dedicated the rest of her life to collecting witness testimony and writing about the people she had known before and during the Holocaust in Poland. From 1945 to 1950 she worked at the Jewish Historical Institute in Warsaw collecting witness testimonies, mainly from survivors of Treblinka. In November 1945 she was a member of a fact-finding mission to Treblinka conducted by the Polish State Committee for the Investigation of Nazi War Crimes on Polish Soil, and published a report and analysis of the functioning of the camp and those who were murdered. She co-founded the Central Jewish Historical Commission in Łódź and served as literary and history editor for its publication Dos Naye Leben. She created guidelines for collecting witness testimony and began publishing testimonies in Yiddish and Polish.

In 1950 she and several colleagues quit the commission when Jewish communists began to exert more influence over its activities. She immigrated to Israel, settling in Tel Aviv.

=== Yad Vashem ===
On March 1, 1954, Auerbakh was named director of Yad Vashem's new Department for the Collection of Witness Testimony, which was based in Tel Aviv where most Holocaust survivors had settled. In this role, she interviewed local survivors and began compiling a database of survivors who lived elsewhere. She introduced new methodologies for collecting witness testimonies and trained Holocaust archivists and researchers. While she encouraged survivors to write their memoirs, she was critical of the popular novels being written about the Holocaust in the genre of historical fiction. She continued to write articles and books about Jewish cultural life before and during the Holocaust in her native Polish and Yiddish, finding it difficult to attain fluency in Hebrew.

Auerbakh accorded great importance to witness testimonies as a Holocaust research tool for three reasons. First, the available Holocaust documentation largely originated from Nazi sources, which "told only the story of the murderers, but not of the murdered". Witness testimony allowed researchers to understand Jewish lives during the Holocaust, not just the mechanics of Jewish deaths. Second, she saw these testimonies as therapeutic for the survivors, saying: "I am convinced that the confessions, called giving testimony, from the era of the Holocaust have a calming and healing influence and help free them [the survivors] from the horrors". Third, she believed it was crucial to build documentation that could be used in future criminal trials of Nazis. Auerbakh later gathered witness testimonies for the 1961 trial of Adolf Eichmann and personally testified at that trial regarding spiritual life in the Warsaw Ghetto.

By 1965 Auerbakh's department had amassed a collection of 3,000 witness testimonies in 15 languages. However, she and other "survivor historians" experienced ongoing tension with the Yad Vashem directorate, headed by Ben-Zion Dinur, who viewed Holocaust research as also embracing "the war against anti-Semitism", "persecution of the Jews", "research on the Jewish question", and "hatred of Israel". Tensions between Auerbakh and Dinur reached a head in 1957–1958, but Auerbakh emerged with her department intact and a large measure of public opinion on the side of the survivor historians. However, in 1968, when she turned 65, the Yad Vashem directorate demanded that she retire.

== Final years and legacy ==
She was diagnosed with breast cancer in 1972 and was hospitalized for a recurrence of the disease in December 1975. She died on May 31, 1976, at the age of 72.

Auerbakh willed her estate to Yad Vashem. The Rokhl Auerbach Personal Archives (Inventory no. P–16) at Yad Vashem contain "personal, published and unpublished manuscripts in Polish and Yiddish, preparatory material concerning her testimony at the Nuremberg and Eichmann trials, declarations, correspondence, recordings, photographs, film, scripts (in Polish, Yiddish and English), and administrative documents concerning the Department for Collecting Witness Testimony at Yad Vashem".

== Personal life ==
Auerbakh never married. She lived with Jewish poet Itzik Manger in prewar Warsaw and was the inspiration for some of his poems. She rescued Manger's archive and returned it to him in London after the war.

== Selected bibliography ==
In addition to her many newspaper articles and essays, Auerbakh wrote the following books:

- Oyf di Felder fun Treblinke [In the Fields of Treblinka] (in Yiddish). Warsaw. 1947.
- Der Yidisher Oyfshtand: Varshe 1943 [The Jewish Uprising in Warsaw 1943] (in Yiddish). Warsaw. 1948.
- Undzer Kheshbn mitn Daytshn Folk [Our Reckoning With the German People] (in Yiddish). Tel Aviv. 1952.
- Behutsot Varsha 1939–1943 [In the Streets of Warsaw 1939–1943] (in Hebrew). Tel Aviv. 1954.
- Marad Geto Varsha [The Warsaw Ghetto Uprising] (in Hebrew). Tel Aviv. 1963.
- In Land Yisroel: Reportazshn, Eseyen, Dertseylungen [In the Land of Israel: Reportage, Essays, Stories] (in Yiddish). Tel Aviv. 1964.
- Varshever Tsavoes: Bagegenishn, Aktivitetn, Goyroles, 1933–1945 [Warsaw Testaments: Encounters, Activities, Fates 1933–1945] (in Yiddish). Tel Aviv. 1974. (translated into Hebrew as Tzavaot varshah: Mifgashim, Maasim, Goralot (Warsaw Testaments: Encounters, Activities, Fates 1933–1945], Tel Aviv: 1985)
- Baym Letstn Veg: In Geto Varshe un oyf der Arisher Zayt [On the Last Journey: In the Warsaw Ghetto and on the Aryan Side] (in Yiddish). Tel Aviv. 1977.

== Sources ==
- Klingenstein, Susanne (1998). Enlarging America: The Cultural Work of Jewish Literary Scholars, 1930–1990. Syracuse University Press. ISBN 0815605404.
- Roskies, David G. (1999). "Landkentenish: Yiddish Belles Lettres in the Warsaw Ghetto". In Shapiro, Robert Moses (ed.). Holocaust Chronicles: Individualizing the Holocaust Through Diaries and Other Contemporaneous Personal Accounts. KTAV Publishing House. ISBN 0881256307.
- Roskies, David G.; Wolf, Leonard (2013). "Introduction". In Manger, Itzik (ed.). The World According to Itzik: Selected Poetry and Prose. Open Road Media. ISBN 978-1480440777.
