= Simon Horontchik =

Polish-Jewish writer (1889–1939)

- שמעון האָראָנטשיק
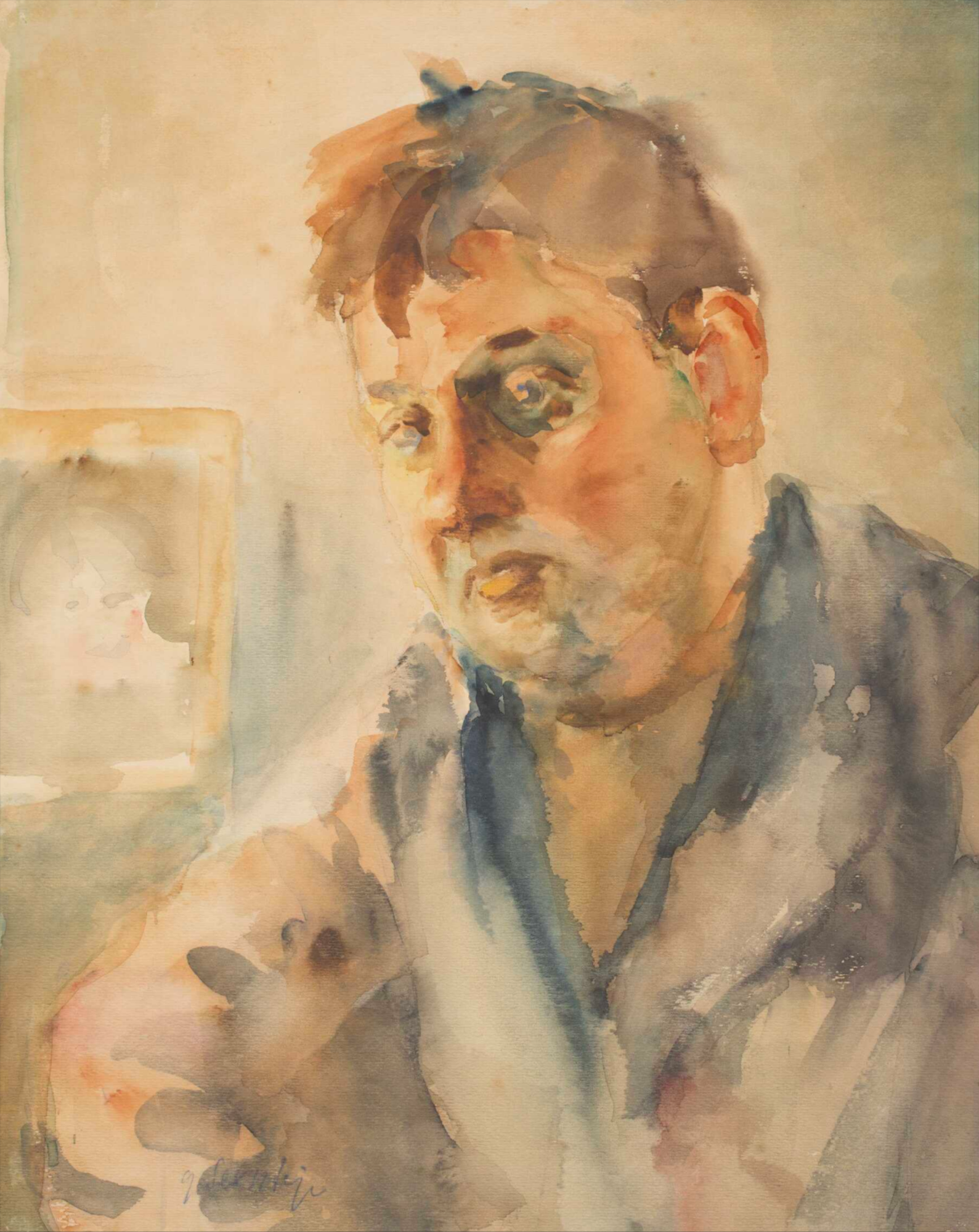
- Portrait of Horontchik by Gela Seksztajn
- Born: 13 June 1889; Vyelun, Kalisz Governorate, Vistula Land
- Died: September 1939 (aged 50); Kalushin, Poland
- Writing career
- Language: Yiddish

Simon Horontchik (Yiddish: שמעון האָראָנטשיק; 13 June 1889 – September 1939) was a Polish Jewish novelist and short story writer writing in Yiddish.

Horontchik was born into a poor Hasidic family in Wieluń. He worked as a labourer at a lacework factory in Kalisz from the age of 17 until the outbreak of the First World War, during which time he began composing poetry. He narrowly escaped the destruction of Kalisz in August 1914, fleeing to Lodz and then Sompolno. There he became a grocer and married.

His first publication was a short story in the Yiddish daily Lodzsher Togblat in 1916. He published poetry in numerous publications until 1921, when he published his first book, Feldblumen ('Flowers of the Field'; Warsaw, 1921), thereafter devoting himself primarily to prose writing.

He lived for several years in Vlatslavek, Paris, Berlin, and Warsaw. He fled toward Vilna upon the Nazi occupation of Warsaw in September 1939, but ran into German troops engaged in a pogrom in Kalushin. He committed suicide to avoid a violent death.

== Partial bibliography ==
- Feldblimen [Flowers of the Field]. Warsaw: Vaysenberg Ferlag. 1921.
- Farplonterte vegn, oder tsvishn di khurves fun yidishn lebn [Confused Ways, or, Among the Ruins of Jewish Life]. Warsaw: S. Goldfarb. 1924.
- In geroysh fun mashinen, roman in tsvey teyln [Amid the Whirr of Machines: A Novel in Two Parts]. Warsaw: Farlag Kultur-lige. 1930 [1928].
- 1905, roman [1905: A Novel]. Warsaw: Farlag Kultur-lige. 1929.
- Zump, roman [Swamp: A Novel]. Warsaw: Farlag Kultur-lige. 1931.
- Baym shvel [At the Threshold]. Warsaw: Kinder-fraynd. 1935.
- Shtarke mentshn, noveln [Strong People: Novellas]. Warsaw: Farlag Kultur-lige. 1936.
- Masn, roman [Masses: A Novel]. Warsaw: Farlag Kultur-lige. 1929.
- Dos hoyz afn barg, roman [The House on the Mountain: A Novel]. Warsaw: Farlag Kultur-lige. 1934.
- Tsvey veltn [Two Worlds]. Warsaw: Farlag Kultur-lige. 1935.
- Di printsesin, un andere dertseylungen [The Princess, and Other Stories]. Warsaw: Farlag Kultur-lige. 1938.
- Geklibene shriftn [Selected Writings]. Warsaw: Yidish-bukh. 1950.
