= Szlama =

Szlama (diminutive Szlamek) is a Polish Yiddish male given name of Š-L-M.

Notable people with the name include:

- Szlama Ber Winer (1911–1942), Polish Jew from Izbica Kujawska, who escaped from the Chełmno extermination camp
- Szlama Grzywacz (1909-1944), member of the French resistance
