= Uerikon railway station =

Railway station in Canton of Zürich, Switzerland

Uerikon
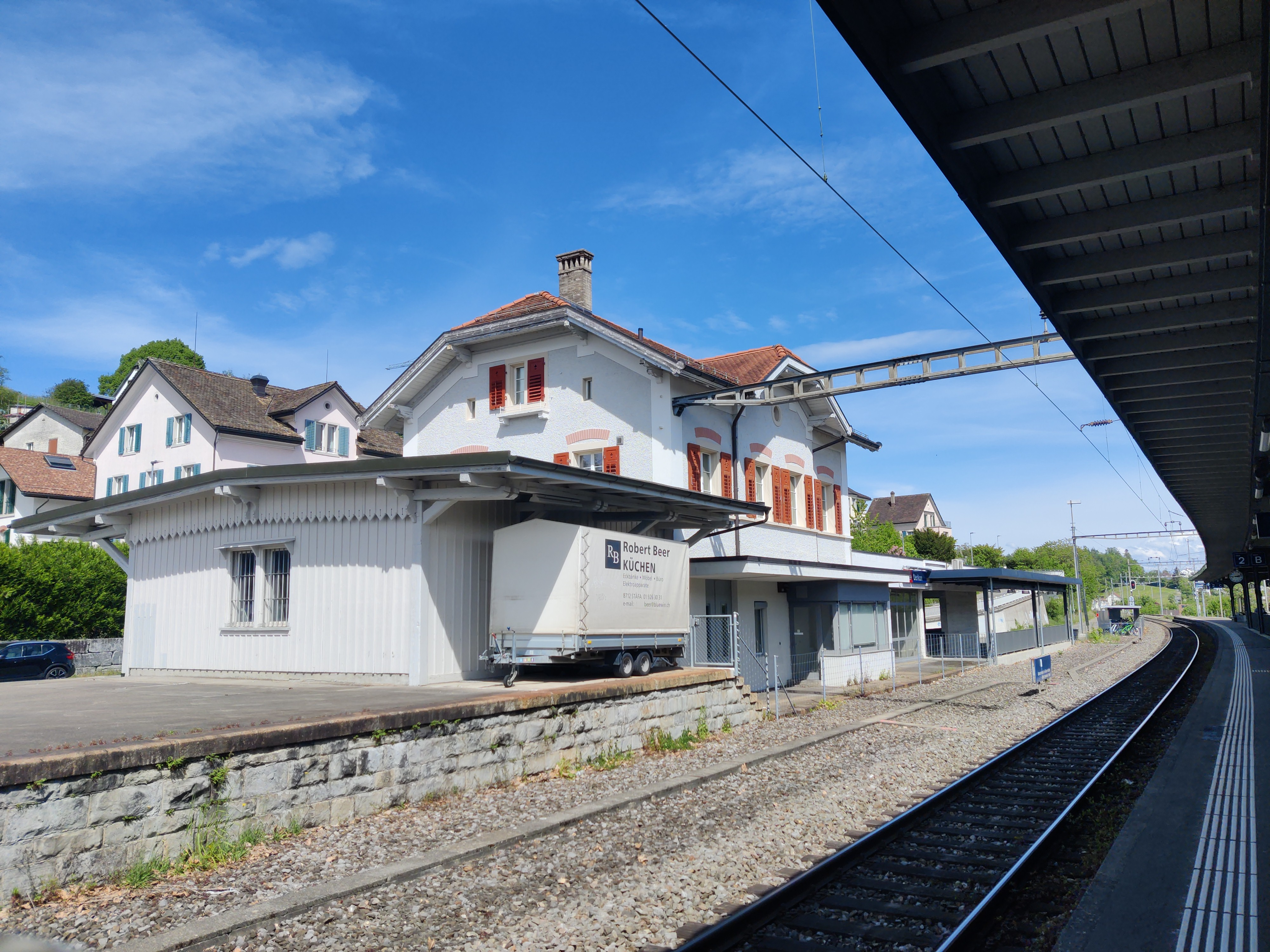
- The station building, platform and tracks in 2024

General information
- Location: Stationstrasse; Uerikon, Stäfa, Zürich; Switzerland
- Coordinates: 47°14′09″N 8°45′08″E
- Elevation: 426 m (1,398 ft)
- Owner: Swiss Federal Railways
- Operator: Swiss Federal Railways
- Lines: Lake Zürich right-bank railway line; Uerikon–Bauma railway (1901–1948)
- Distance: 28.9 km (18.0 mi) from Zürich Hauptbahnhof
- Platforms: 1 island platform
- Tracks: 2
- Train operators: Swiss Federal Railways
- Connections: ZVV
- Ship: ZSG passenger ships
- Bus: VZO bus routes 951 952

Other information
- Fare zone: 143 (ZVV)

Services
Preceding station	Zurich S-Bahn	Following station
Stäfa towards Winterthur	S7	Feldbach towards Rapperswil
Stäfa towards Zürich Hardbrücke	S20 Limited service	Terminus
Location
- Location within Switzerland Location within Canton of Zürich

Uerikon railway station (German: Bahnhof Uerikon) is a railway station in the Swiss canton of Zurich, situated near the village of Uerikon in the municipality of Stäfa on the eastern shore of Lake Zurich (Goldcoast). The station is located on the Lake Zurich right-bank line, within fare zone 143 of the Zürcher Verkehrsverbund (ZVV).

Uerikon station used to be a junction station with the former Uerikon–Bauma railway (UeBB), which between 1901 and 1948 linked Uerikon with Hombrechtikon, Bubikon, Hinwil, Bäretswil and Bauma.

== Services ==
As of the December 2021 timetable change, the following S-Bahn services stop at Uerikon:

- Zurich S-Bahn:
  - S7: half-hourly service between Winterthur and Rapperswil
  - S20: on weekdays, morning rush-hour service to Zürich Hardbrücke.

A regional bus stop is adjacent to the railway station, served by buses of the Verkehrsbetriebe Zürichsee und Oberland (VZO).

Additionally, passenger ships of the Zürichsee-Schifffahrtsgesellschaft (ZSG) operate from a lakeside terminal located a short distance southeast of the railway station. The boats operate either in direction to Zurich Bürkliplatz or Rapperswil/Schmerikon, serving the terminals of several lakeside towns and Ufenau island en route.

== Gallery ==
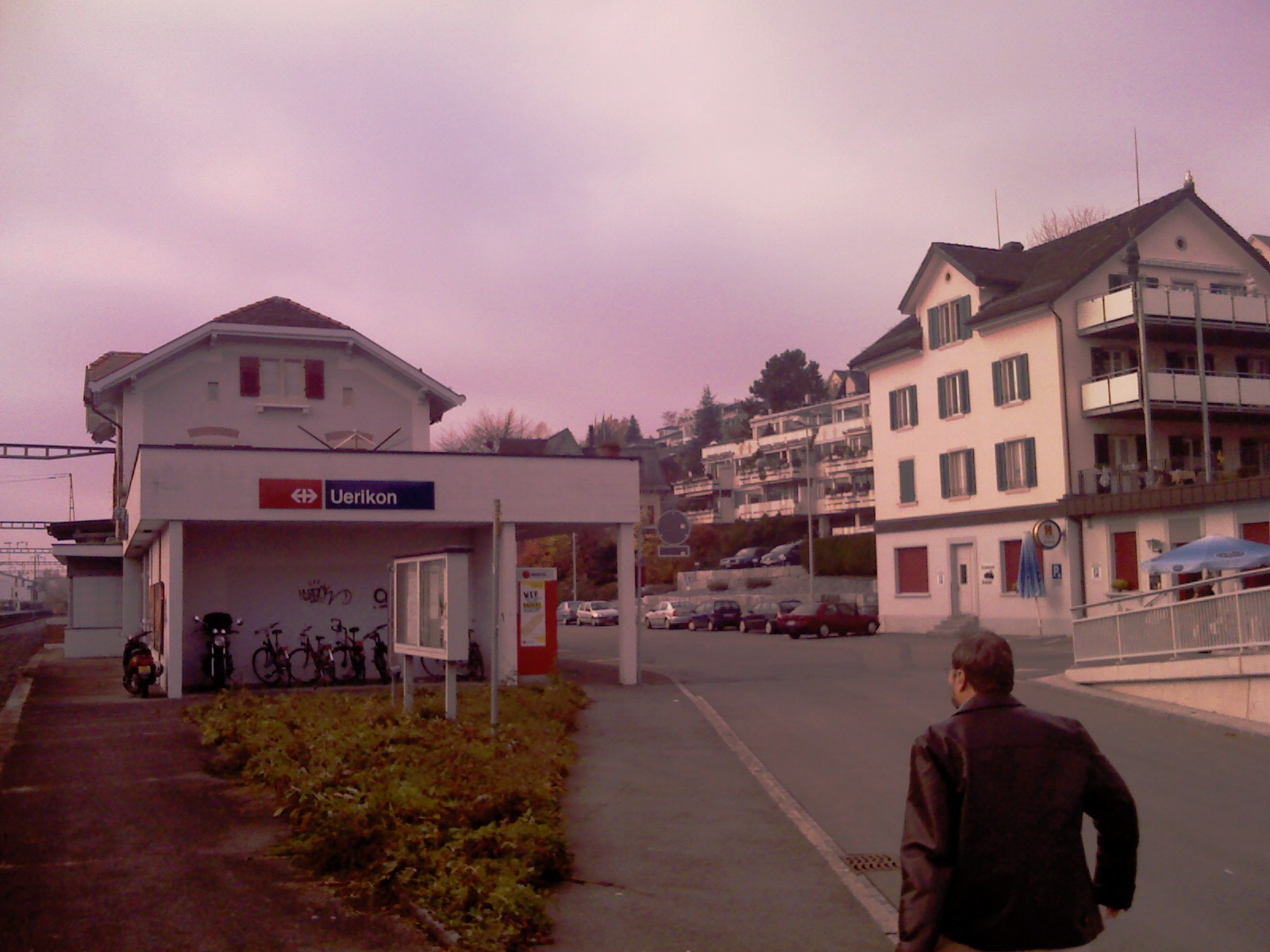
The station in 2008

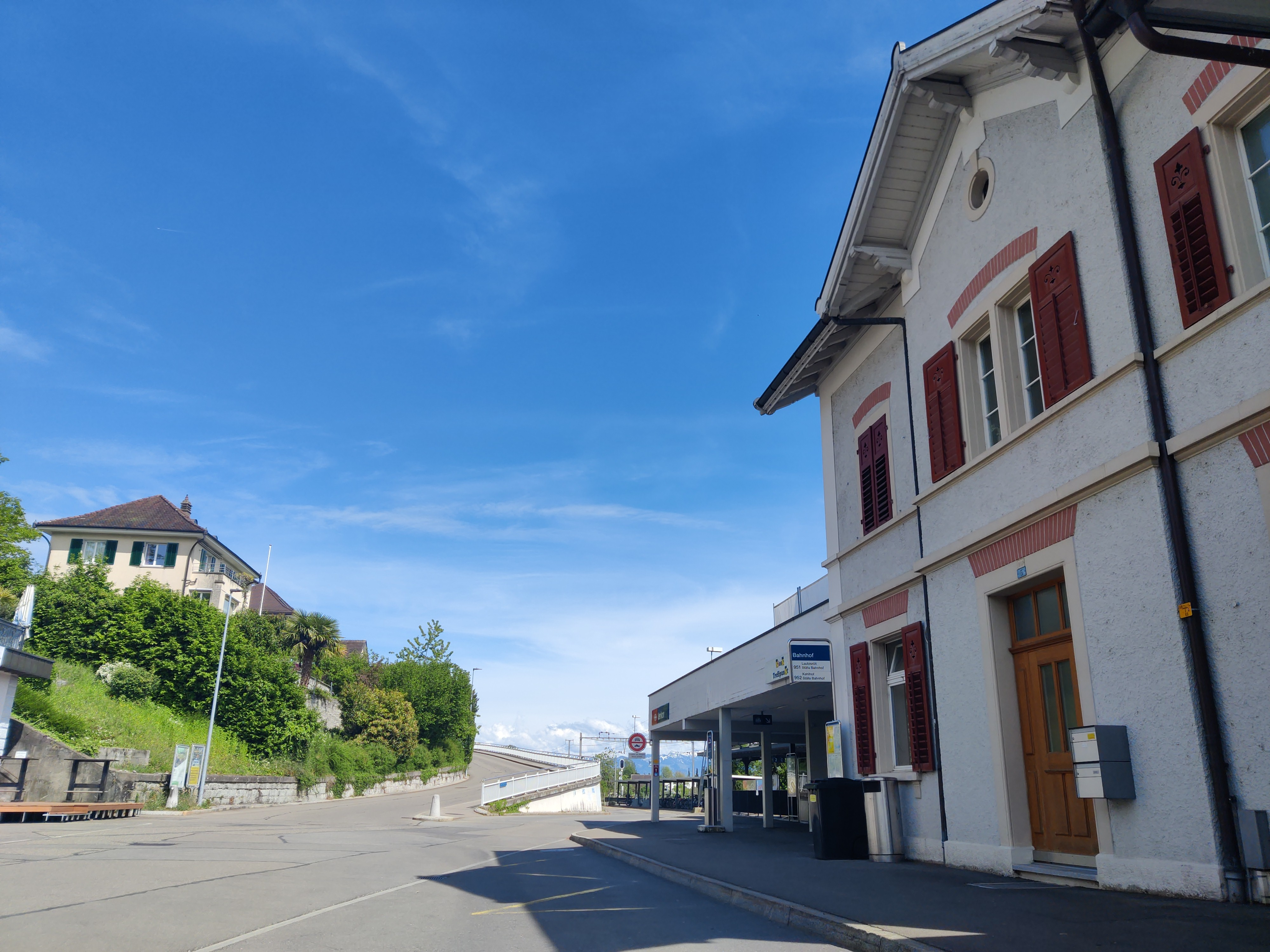
The station forecourt in 2024

== See also ==
- Rail transport in Switzerland
