= Gela Seksztajn =

Polish painter

- Gela Seksztajn, circa 1938
- Born: Gela Seksztajn; 1907; Warsaw, Poland
- Died: 1943 (aged 35–36); Warsaw, Poland
- Education: Academy of Fine arts (ASP), Kraków
- Known for: Painting, Participating in the Ringelblum Archive
- Spouse: Izrael Lichtensztejn

Gela Seksztajn (1907–1943; also known as Gele Seckstein) was a Polish artist and painter. She is known mostly for her portraits and other paintings hidden within the Ringelblum Archive, in the Warsaw Ghetto during the Holocaust. The paintings were found after the end of World War II, and are now held mostly in the archive of the Jewish Historical Institute, in Warsaw, Poland.

== Early life ==
Gela was born in Warsaw in a working-class family. Her father was a cobbler, and her mother died in 1918. The writer Israel Joshua Singer discovered her talent. Through him she met actor and director Jonas Turkow, who introduced her in turn to the sculptor Henryk Kuna. Thanks to Kuna's help, she received a two-month scholarship to study in the ASP in Kraków. Gela paid her benefactors back in the 1930s by drawing their portraits. Gela spent about 13 years in Kraków; according to her own testimony, she studied in the academy for two years, but her name was not recorded in any of the enrollment lists of the school's archives. Starting in 1931, she visited Warsaw regularly to display her work in group exhibitions several times during the 1930s, and she moved to Warsaw in 1937. She was a member of the Association of Jewish Artists, and the Jewish Society of Fine Arts, both in Warsaw. During this period she painted numerous portraits of Jewish figures in Warsaw, mostly intellectuals and writers. Among these portraits are those of Rachel Korn, Baruch Gelman, Simon Horontchik, Itzik Manger and Moshe Broderson.

== Warsaw years ==
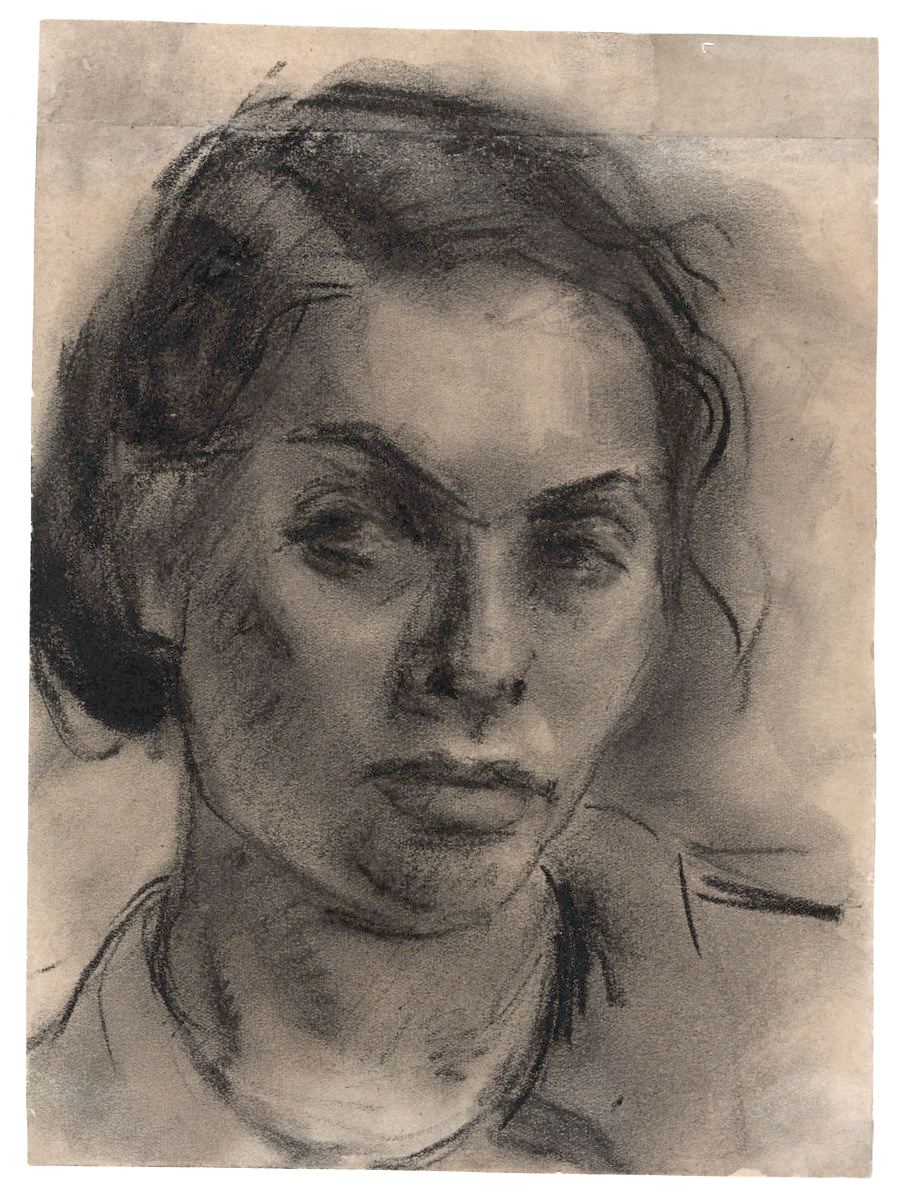
Self portrait of Gela Seksztajn, most likely drawn in the Warsaw Ghetto

Gela moved to Warsaw in 1937. She married the journalist Izrael Lichtensztejn in 1938. During those years she worked as a teacher of arts and handicrafts in Jewish schools. During the late 1930s she painted a large number of portraits and scenes. She participated in several exhibitions and received good reviews during these years.

== Warsaw Ghetto and Ringelblum archive ==
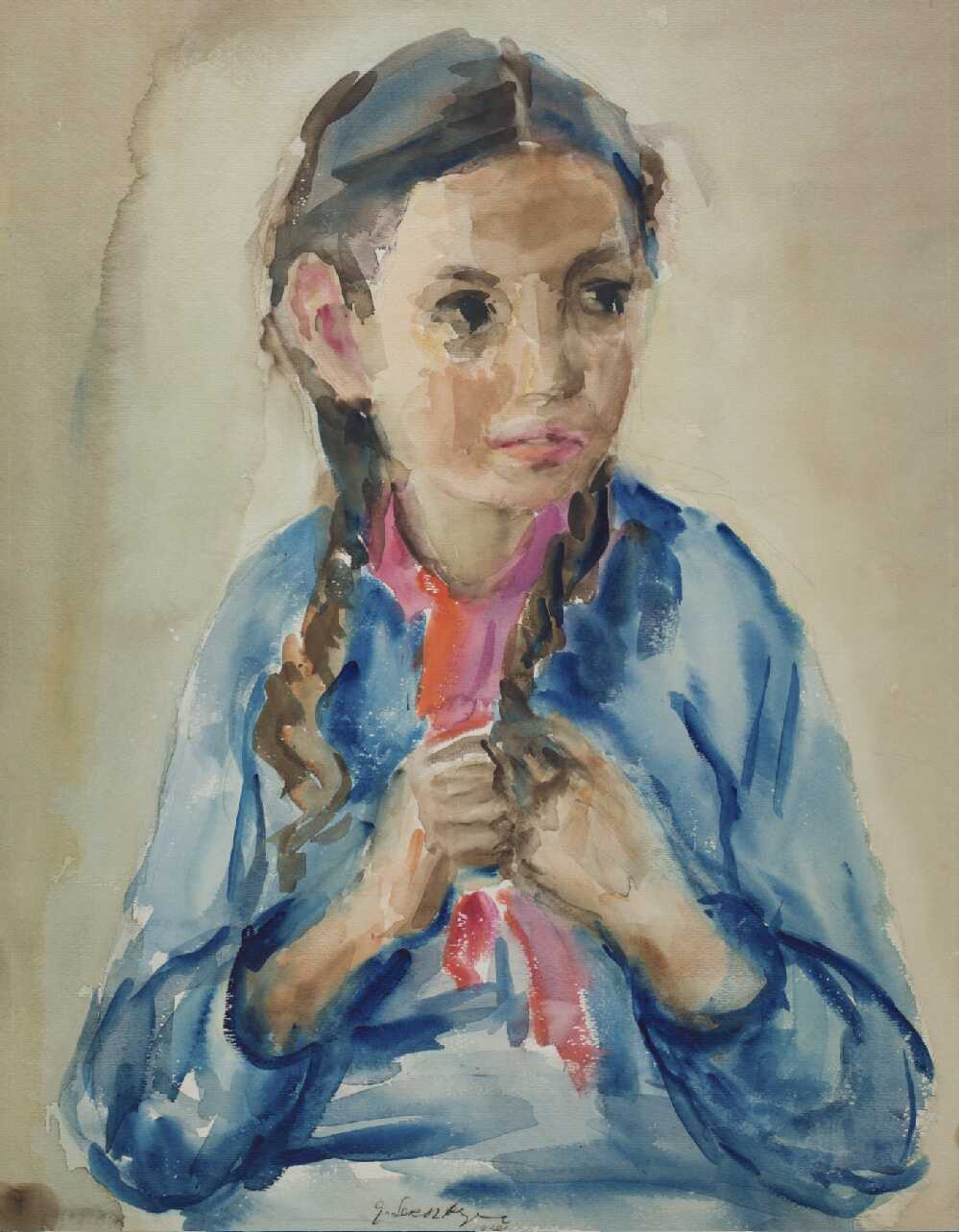
Portrait of a girl

Gela and her husband Izrael were forced to move into the Warsaw Ghetto probably in 1940. Just before the ghetto was sealed off in that year, Gela gave birth to her daughter, Margalit. Gela and Izrael were both active in the ghetto in charity organizations. Gela held drawing classes in the ghetto, and mounted small exhibits of her students' works. She probably participated in making the costumes for a children's show entitled "The Seasons" in 1942. She was awarded a prize, for her work with children, by the Judenrat chairman Adam Czerniaków. Gela continued to paint during her ghetto years, drawing portraits such as children in the soup kitchen, her daughter, her husband, and her friends writers. Gela, together with Izrael, actively participated in the Oneg Shabbat enterprise, headed by Dr. Emmanuel Ringelblum, which dealt with secretly documenting Jewish life within the ghetto. In July 1942 German deportations from the ghetto started. Knowing that the end is near, Gela prepared her works for hiding in the secret archive. In the early days of August, Izrael Lichtenstejn her spouse, and two of his students, Dawid Graber and Nachum Grzywacz, hid Gela's paintings, together with other documents, in the archive boxes that he buried in a school cellar on Nowolipki Str. The exact date of Gela's death is unknown, but it is believed she died during the Warsaw Ghetto Uprising.

Gela left more than 300 paintings. Most of them can be found in the Jewish Historical Institute, although there are a few paintings also in Washington Holocaust museum and one oil painting in Yad Vashem art section. Gela is mentioned in Izrael Lichtenstejn's will from 1943, cited in Paul Auster's book, The Invention of Solitude. He writes there: "I want my wife to be remembered. Gele Seckstein, artist, dozens of works, talented, didn't manage to exhibit, did not show in public. During the three years of war worked among children as educator, teacher, made stage sets, costumes for the children's productions, received awards. Now together with me, we are preparing to receive death..."
