= Uerikon =

Village in Zurich, Switzerland

Coordinates: 47°14′N 8°45′E

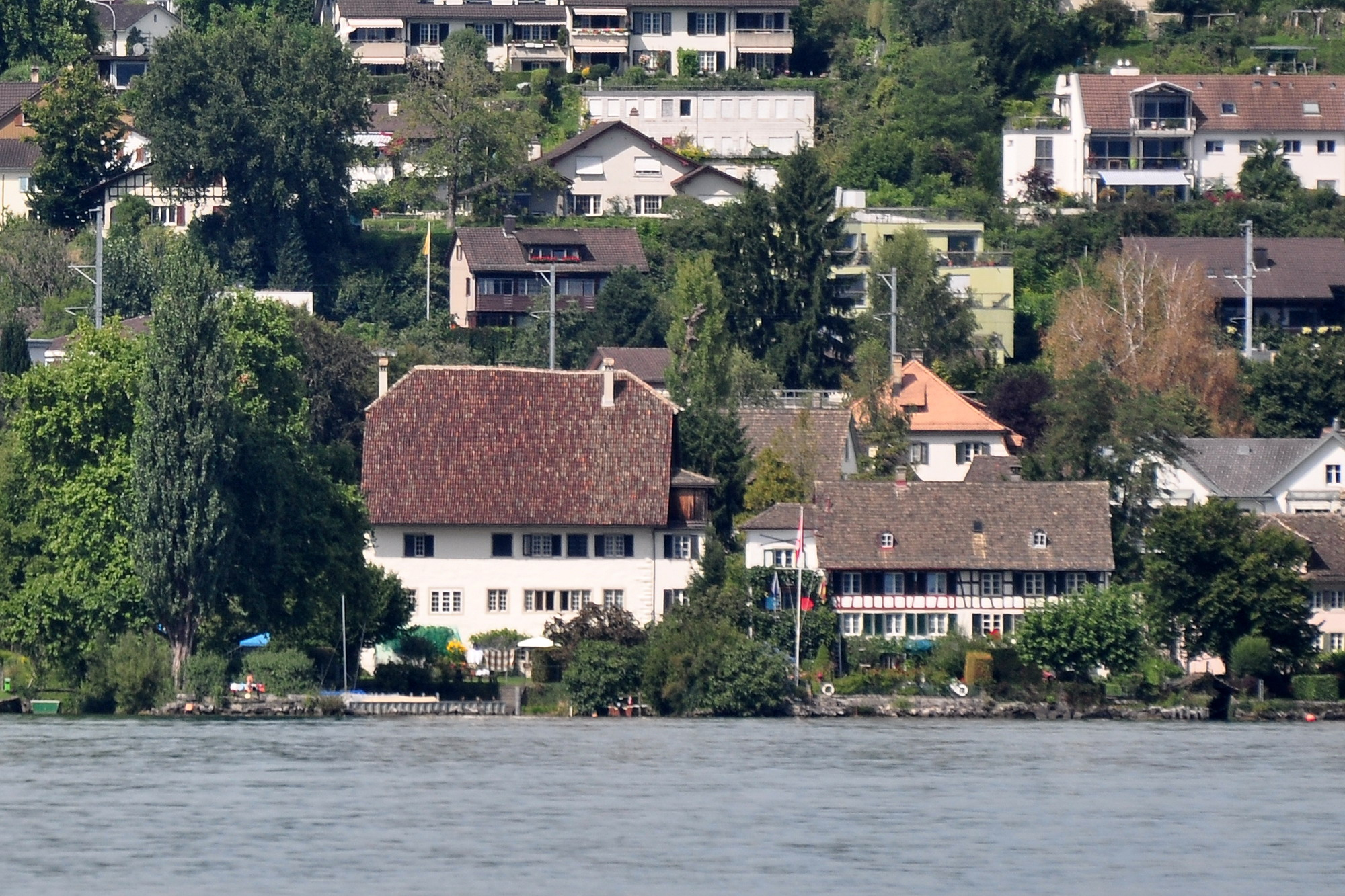
Uerikon

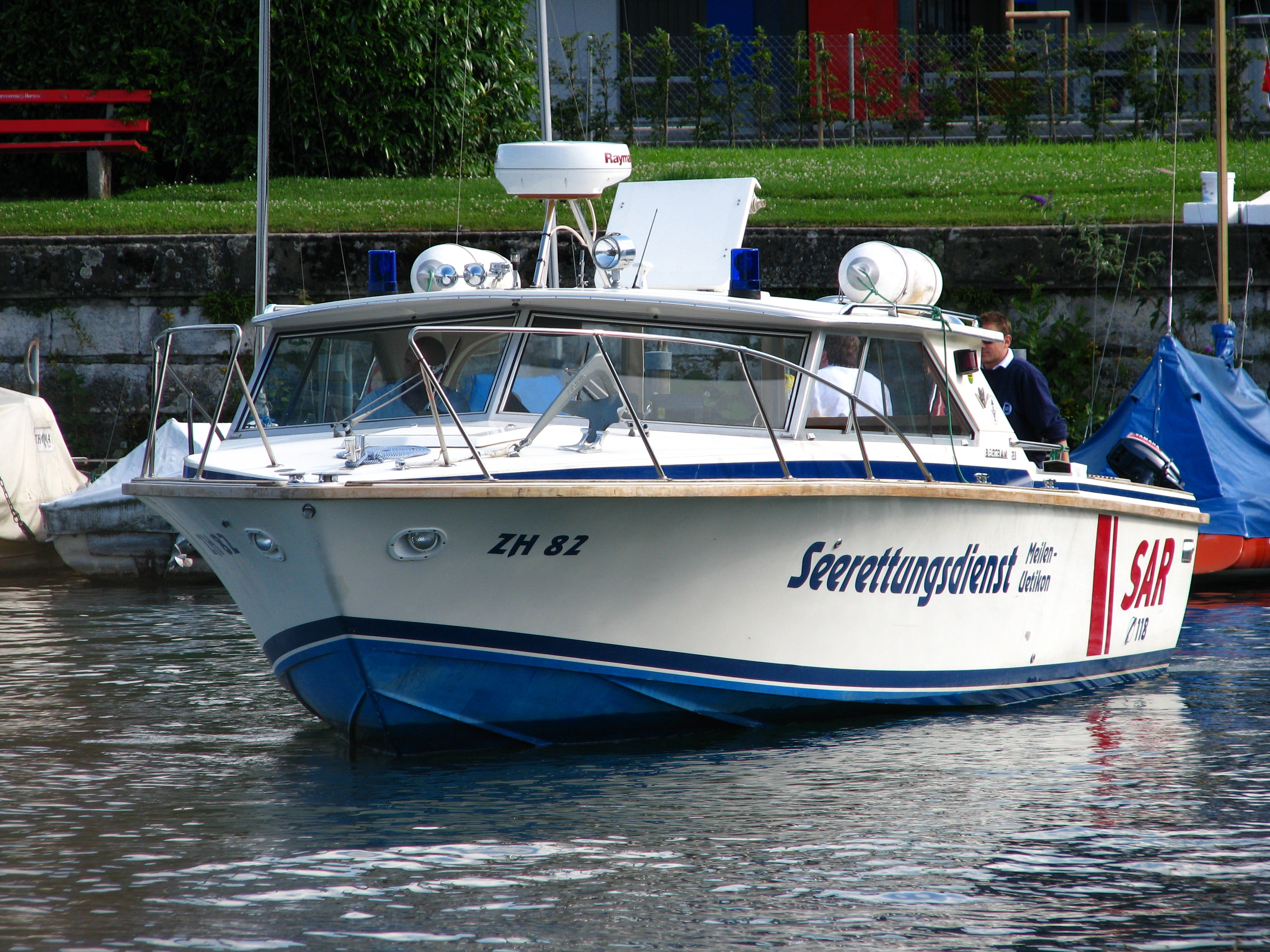
Boat of the SAR (Seerettungsdienst) Meilen-Uerikon

Uerikon (also spelled Ürikon) is a village near Rapperswil, Switzerland.

== Geography ==
Aerial view (1953)

Uerikon is located on the north bank of the Zürichsee (Lake Zürich) in the Pfannenstiel region and is part of the political municipality of Stäfa. In the local dialect it is called Ürike.

== History and points of interest ==
There is an old mansion (Ritterhuus) built in 1531 that bases on a tiny castle of 1492 serving as place of the former local administration of the Einsiedeln Abbey. It is located at the lake shore.

== Transportation ==
Uerikon railway station is a stop of the S-Bahn Zürich on the line S7 and in the rush-hour S20. In this village there are 3 different Buslines. The Line 951 from Uerikon railway station to Stäfa railway station 952 from Uerikon railway station to Stäfa railway station and the Line 955 from Stäfa railway station to Hombrechtikon Post and further to Bubikon
