= Kehlhof =

Village in Zurich, Switzerland

Coordinates: 47.2343°N 8.7385°E

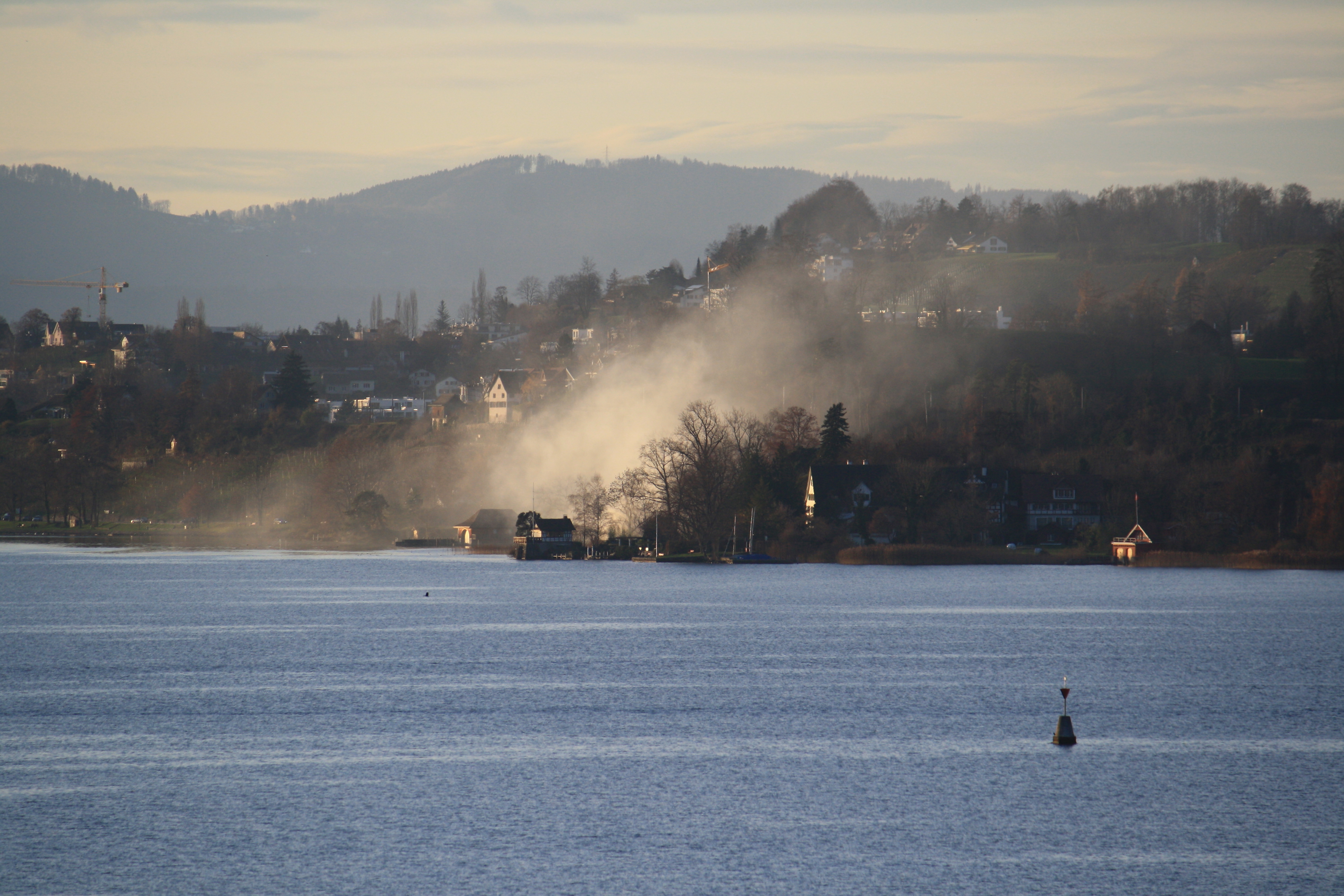
Kehlhof as seen from Lindenhof in Rapperswil

Aerial view from 200 m by Walter Mittelholzer (1919)

Kehlhof is a village near Rapperswil, Switzerland. It is located on the north bank of the lake of Zurich and is part of the political municipality of Stäfa. In the local dialect it is called Chälhof.

There is an old mansion (Villa Sunneshy) located at the lake shore. This mansion is owned by the municipality and now a cultural centre.
