= Stäfa =

- Municipality
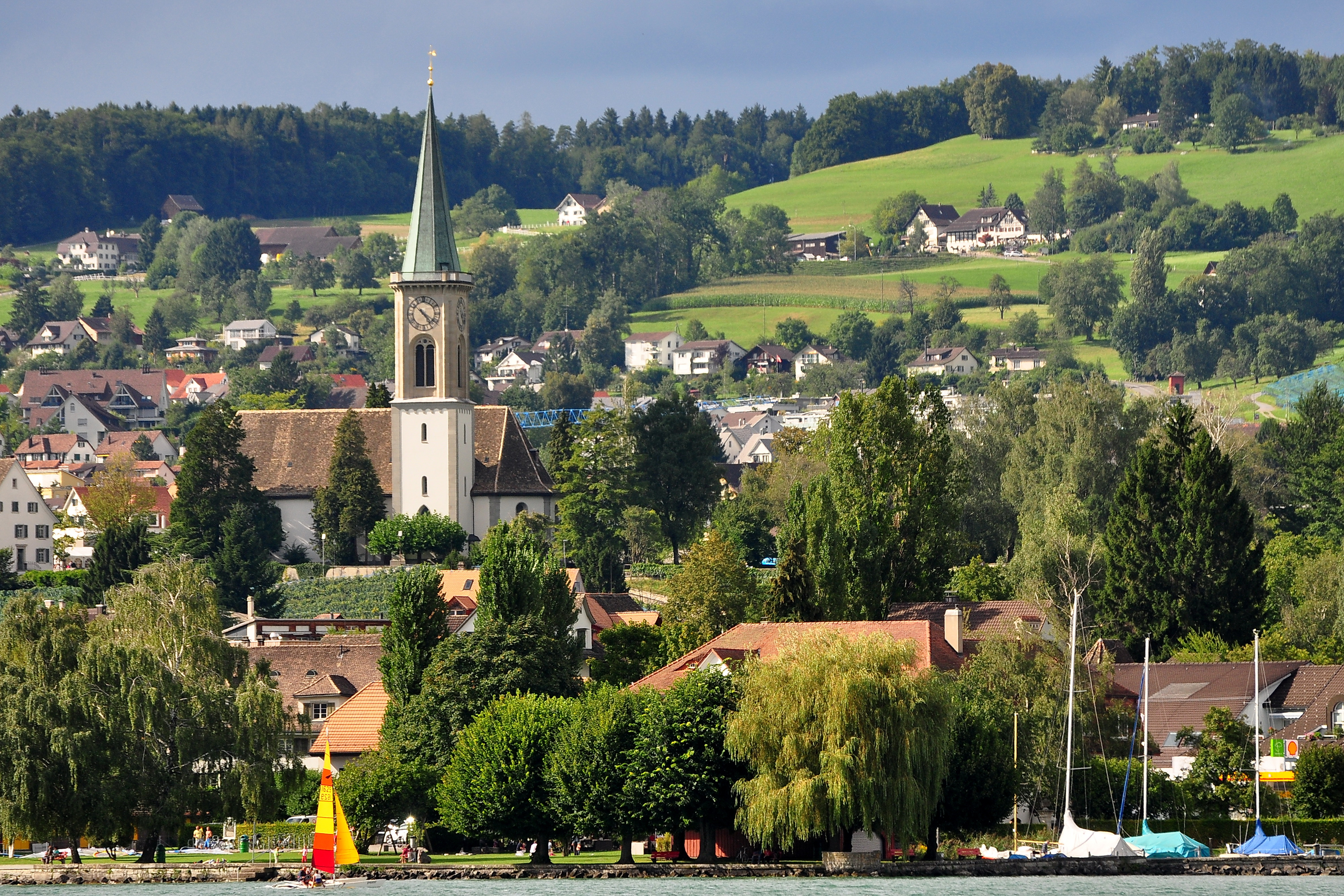

- Flag Coat of arms
- Location of Stäfa
- Location within Switzerland Location within Canton of Zurich
- Coordinates: 47.24°N 8.73°E
- Country: Switzerland
- Canton: Zurich
- District: Meilen

Government
  - Mayor: Christian Haltner (FDP.The Liberals) (as of 2014)

Area
  - Total: 8.59 km^{2} (3.32 sq mi)
- Elevation: 408 m (1,339 ft)

Population (December 2020)
  - Total: 14,791
  - Density: 1,720/km^{2} (4,460/sq mi)
- Time zone: UTC+01:00 (CET)
  - Summer (DST): UTC+02:00 (CEST)
- Postal code: 8712
- SFOS number: 158
- ISO 3166 code: CH-ZH
- Surrounded by: Freienbach (SZ), Hombrechtikon, Männedorf, Oetwil am See, Richterswil, Wädenswil
- Website: www.staefa.ch

Stäfa (Swiss Standard German pronunciation: [ˈʃtɛːfa]) is a municipality in the district of Meilen in the canton of Zürich in Switzerland.

== Geography ==
Aerial view from 150 m by Walter Mittelholzer (1919)

Stäfa has an area of 8.6 km^{2} (3.3 sq mi). Of this area, 46.1% is used for agricultural purposes, while 18.8% is forested. Of the rest of the land, 34% is settled (buildings or roads) and the remainder (1%) is non-productive (rivers, glaciers or mountains). In 1996 housing and buildings made up 26.7% of the total area, while transportation infrastructure made up the rest (7.2%). Of the total unproductive area, water (streams and lakes) made up 0.5% of the area. As of 2007 35.8% of the total municipal area was undergoing some type of construction.

It is located near Rapperswil on the north bank of Lake Zürich in the Pfannenstiel region.

Named after the Scottish Island of Staffa by a monk from Iona, in the local dialect it is called Stäfa. The early history of Stäfa is closely linked to Einsiedeln Abbey. In 972 King Otto II confirmed in documents possessions of the abbey on the lake, including Steveia (Stäfa).

The villages of Kehlhof and Uerikon are politically part of the town. Stäfa is linked with the German poet Goethe who once stayed overnight in the town.

== Demographics ==
Stäfa has a population (as of 31 December 2020) of 14,791. As of 2018, 18.9% of the population was made up of foreign nationals. As of 2018, the gender distribution of the population was 48.4% male and 51.6% female. Over the last 5 years, the population has grown by 4.1%. Most of the population (as of 2000) speaks German (88.6%), with Italian being second most common (3.3%) and Albanian being third (1.4%).

In the 2007 election the most popular party was the SVP which received 32.8% of the vote. The next three most popular parties were the SPS (20.1%), the FDP (16.2%) and the CSP (11%).

The age distribution of the population (as of 2000) is children and teenagers (0–19 years old) make up 20.7% of the population, while adults (20–64 years old) make up 63.1% and seniors (over 64 years old) make up 16.2%. In Stäfa about 80.5% of the population (between the ages 25–64) have completed either non-mandatory upper secondary education or additional higher education (either university or a Fachhochschule). There are 5179 households in Stäfa.

Stäfa has an unemployment rate of 2.14%. As of 2005, there were 153 people employed in the primary economic sector and about 34 businesses involved in this sector. 1592 people are employed in the secondary sector and there are 103 businesses in this sector. 2551 people are employed in the tertiary sector, with 508 businesses in this sector. As of 2007 55.3% of the working population were employed full-time, and 44.7% were employed part-time.

As of 2008 there were 3545 Catholics and 6005 Protestants in Stäfa. In the 2000 census, religion was broken down into several smaller categories. From the census, 50.9% were some type of Protestant, with 47.5% belonging to the Swiss Reformed Church and 3.4% belonging to other Protestant churches. 27.2% of the population were Catholic. Of the rest of the population, 3.2% were Muslim, 4.3% belonged to another religion (not listed), 3.6% did not give a religion, and 13.6% were atheist or agnostic.

== Economics and education ==
Zürichsee-Zeitung, a daily newspaper, is situated in Stäfa.

Internationally active high-tech companies Sonova (hearing care) and Sensirion (sensors) are based in Stäfa.

== Transportation ==
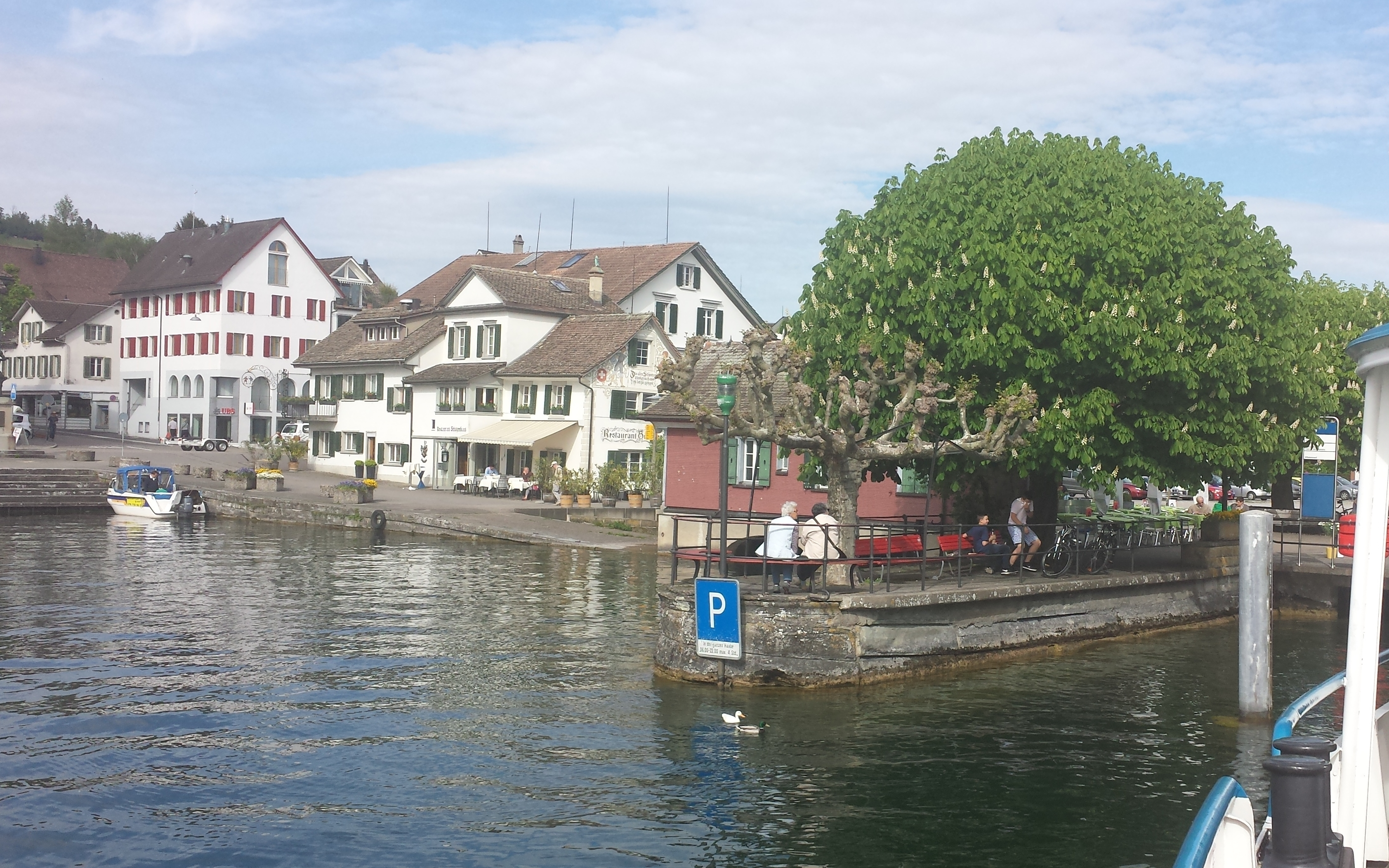
The landing stage and harbour at Stäfa

Stäfa railway station is served by line S7 of the S-Bahn Zürich, which provides two trains per hour to both Zürich and Rapperswil. The journey time to Zürich is about 25 minutes, and somewhat less to Rapperswil.

In summer, Stäfa is served by regular ship services between Zurich and Rapperswil, run by the Zürichsee-Schifffahrtsgesellschaft (ZSG) and calling at various lakeside towns. A passenger ferry, operated on an hourly basis throughout the year by the same company, links Stäfa with Wädenswil on the opposite shore of the lake. The railway station and landing stage are some 5 minutes' walk apart.

Local bus services are operated by the Verkehrsbetriebe Zürichsee und Oberland (VZO) bus company.

== Sights ==
The town is well known for its cultural centre Rössli, located near the lake shore. Wine production is still important, particularly white wine (Riesling).

== Notable people ==
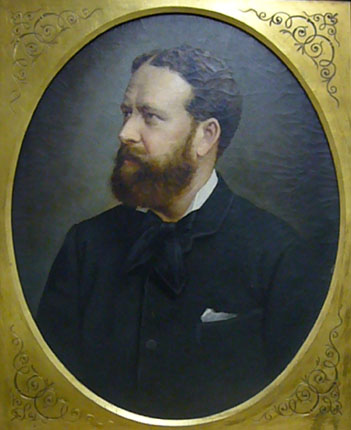
Theodor Eimer

- Theodor Eimer (1843 in Stäfa – 1898) a German zoologist.
- Ernst Wiechert (1887 – 1950 in Stäfa) a German teacher, poet and writer, lived in Stäfa from 1948
- Paul Vogt (1900 in Stäfa - 1984) a Swiss Protestant pastor and theologian
- Karl Landolt (1925 - 2009 in Stäfa) a famous Swiss painter known for his oil paintings, wood-prints and lithography.
- Matthias Ziegler (born 1955) Swiss flautist, lives in Stäfa
- Daniel Jositsch (born 1965), professor and SP politician, lives in Stäfa
- Nick Heidfeld (born 1977) a German professional racing driver, lives in Stäfa
