= Grojanowski Report =

1942 eyewitness account of the Holocaust

The Grojanowski Report is an eye-witness account about atrocities in the Nazi Chełmno extermination camp, written in 1942 by Polish-Jewish escapee from the camp, Szlama Ber Winer (also known incorrectly as Szlawek Bajler), under the pseudonym of Yakov (or Jacob) Grojanowski. Szlama Ber Winer managed to make his way from Chelmno to the Warsaw Ghetto and gave detailed information about his week-long experience with the Sonderkommando at that death camp to the Ghetto's Oneg Shabbat group, headed by historian Emanuel Ringelblum.

== Report contents ==
Winer described the entire extermination procedure at the camp, how people were murdered in gas vans, how their corpses were removed by the forest commando, how the inside of the vans were cleaned between loads, and how the bodies were buried in large mass graves. Winer wrote:

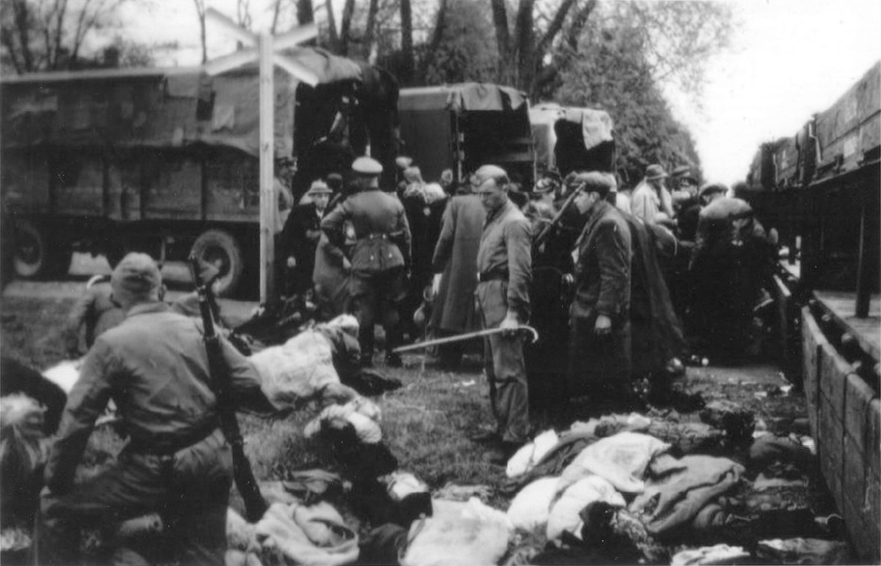
Jews in Koło being deported to Chełmno extermination camp.

We didn’t have to wait long before the next lorry arrived with fresh victims. It was specially constructed. It looked like a normal large lorry, in grey paint, with two hermetically closed rear doors. The inner walls were of steel metal. There weren’t any seats. The floor was covered by a wooden grating, as in public baths, with straw mats on top. Between the driver’s cab and the rear part were two peepholes. With a flashlight one could observe through these peepholes if the victims were already dead. Under the wooden grating were two tubes about 15 centimetres [6 in] thick which came out of the cab. The tubes had small openings from which gas poured out. The gas generator was in the cab, where the same driver sat all the time. He wore a uniform of the SS death’s head units and was about forty years old. There were two such vans.
When the lorries approached we had to stand at a distance of 5 m from the ditch. The leader of the guard detail was a high-ranking SS man, an absolute sadist and murderer. He ordered that eight men were to open the doors of the lorry. The smell of gas that met us was overpowering.

— Wednesday, 7 January 1942.

Winer also described the brutal treatment of Sonderkommando prisoners, left alive to dispose of the corpses, and his escape from the camp. Oneg Shabbat group and Winer then copied the report in both Polish and German; they sent the Polish version to the Polish Underground State, while the German copy was meant for the German people, in the hope it would evoke their compassion for the Jews. It is unclear what was done with the reports at that point.

Winer subsequently escaped to Zamość where he wrote to the Warsaw Ghetto of the existence of a death camp in Bełżec. A few days after writing this letter, towards the end of April 1942, he was rounded up, deported and gassed at Bełżec. Another escaped inmate from Chelmno, Mordechaï Podchlebnik, managed to survive the war, and in 1961 gave testimony at the Eichmann trial in Jerusalem.

== See also ==
- Jan Karski
- Witold Pilecki
- The_World_Will_Tremble_(film)
