= S20 (ZVV) =

Railway service of the Zürich S-Bahn

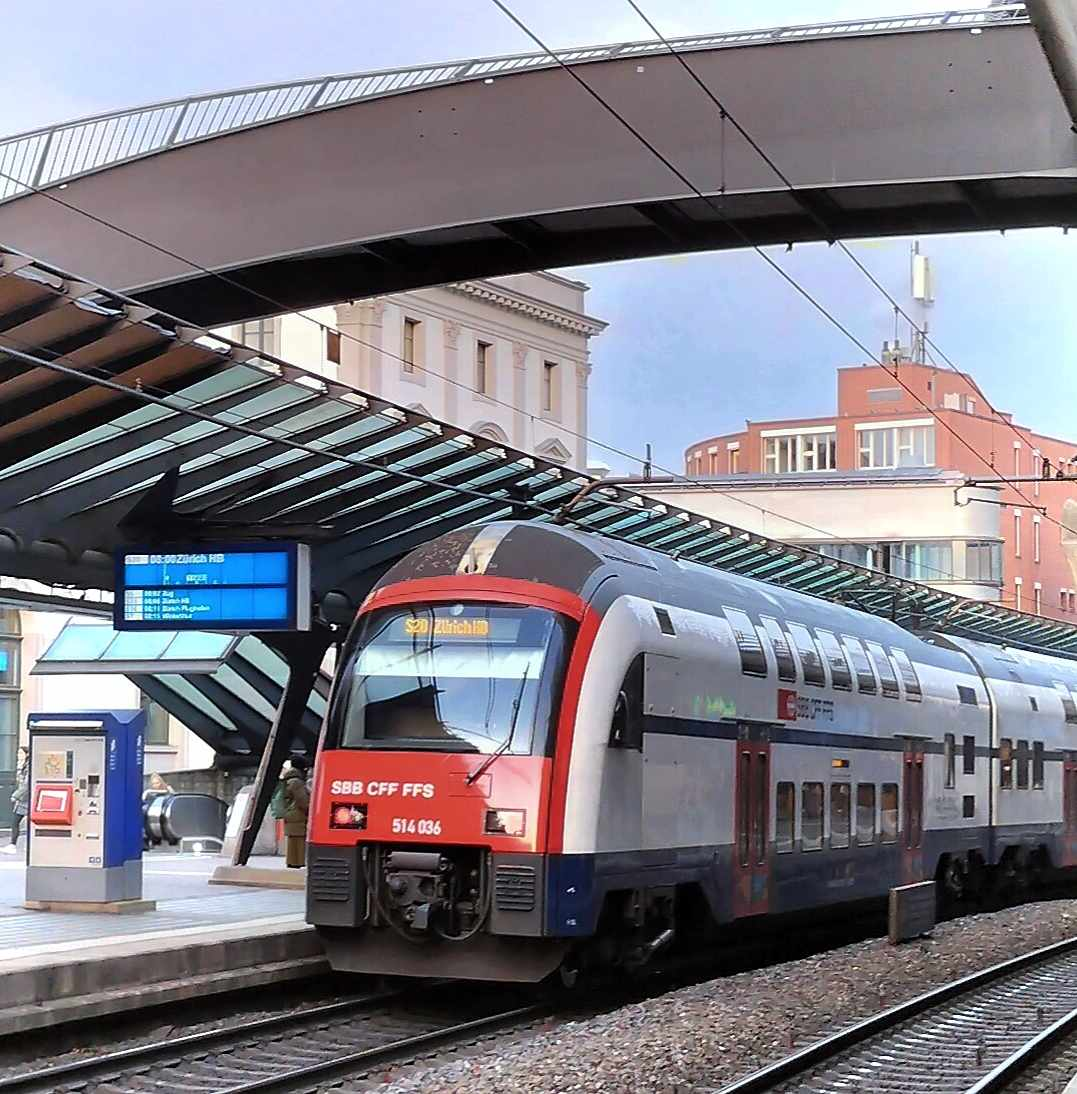
- RABe 514 operating as S20 service in 2024

Overview
- First service: 11 June 2019
- Current operator(s): Swiss Federal Railways

Route
- Termini: Zürich Hardbrücke; Uerikon
- Stops: 4/5
- Distance travelled: 28.9 kilometres (18.0 mi)
- Average journey time: 30/26 minutes
- Service frequency: Three round-trips on weekdays
- Line(s) used: Lake Zürich right-bank railway line

Zürich S-Bahn network as of December 2019

The S20 is a railway service of the Zürich S-Bahn that provides rush-hour service between Zürich Hardbrücke) and Uerikon, in the Swiss canton of Zürich. Swiss Federal Railways operates the service.

At Zürich HB, trains of the S20 service usually depart from underground tracks (Gleis) 41–44 (Museumstrasse station).

== History ==
The S20 was introduced on 11 June 2019, with the initial termini at Zürich Hardbrücke (northwest) and Stäfa (southeast). It was extended from Stäfa to Uerikon with the December 2021 timetable change. With the December 2023 timetable change, the northwestern terminus became Zürich HB and Zürich Tiefenbrunnen, respectively. The northern terminus was again changed to Zürich Hardbrücke with the December 2024 timetable change and the stop at Zürich Tiefenbrunnen is no longer served by the S20.

== Operations ==
- S20 Uerikon–Zürich HB–Hardbrücke
  Operates only during rush hour; stops between Männedorf and Stadelhofen only in Meilen and Küsnacht ZH.

As of the December 2024 timetable change, there are four departures in the morning from Uerikon and three in the late afternoon/early evening from Zürich Hardbrücke. The service does not operate on weekends. Most services are operated by SBB-CFF-FFS Re 420 locomotives pulling coaches.

=== Stations ===
- Zürich Hardbrücke
- Zürich HB
- Zürich Stadelhofen
- Küsnacht ZH
- Meilen
- Männedorf
- Stäfa
- Uerikon

== See also ==
- Rail transport in Switzerland
- List of railway stations in Zurich
- Public transport in Zurich
- ZVV fare zones
