= Silesian-American Corporation =

Silesian-American Corporation (SACO) was registered as a corporation in Delaware in 1926 to assume ownership of the Giesche Spolka Akcyjna (Giesche) that was registered as a corporation in Katowice, Poland earlier during the interwar period. SACO gave substantial loans to Giesche’s Erben by selling $15,000,000 collateral trust sinking fund bonds that would mature on August 1, 1941. Giesche was that part of the holdings of the German corporation Bergwerksgesellschaft Georg von Giesche's Erben (commonly referred to as Giesche’s Erben) that were in the previously German controlled Upper Silesia territory with the re-established Poland.

SACO was 100% owned by: the Silesian Holding Company (51% of common stock and 58,33% of preferred stock) and Giesche (49% of common stock and 41,67% of preferred stock). Silesian Holding Company was owned by Anaconda Copper Mining (65%) and W. Averell Harriman. Harriman's portion would later be owned by Harriman, close affiliates and associates.

== WWII ==
Following invasion in 1939, Silesian-American was among the Polish corporations and companies that were brought under the supervision of a German military commissar, Dr. Albrecht Jung. During this time SACO was denied all income from the European Silesian-American activities and affiliates, and was hence unable to pay dividends on its outstanding bonds, which came due in 1941. At the time, the company had only about half a million dollars in cash. Accordingly, it filed a petition for reorganization under Chapter X of the U.S. Bankruptcy Act.

== Repatriation scheme ==
Before entry to WWII by the U.S., the owners and leading managers of Giesche's Erben sought, through a "repatriation scheme", to regain legal control of Silesian-American through the leadership of Eduard Schulte, the Giesche’s Erben General Manager, and Jung. In 1941, the Swiss bank LaRoche acted jointly with Schulte to register another company in Switzerland, Internationale Kapitalanlegen Gesellschaft (Ikap). Schulte convinced Harriman and Cornelius Kelley (president of Anaconda Copper) to sell their shares in Silesian Holding Company to Ikap. However, the action could not be completed without coming under the scrutiny of the U.S. government owing to the Presidential freeze order, which was extended to Switzerland on June 14, 1941—the order mandated that transactions which potentially could benefit an enemy be subject to the review and approval of the United States Treasury Department. The first of three applications to transfer stock ownership from U.S. holders to enemy holders was refused by the Treasury Department on July 26, 1941; the other two were in August and December.

On November 17, 1942, the Alien Property Custodian as authorized by the Trading with the Enemy Act, took over control of the German-owned shares of the Silesian-American Corporation. The stock, prior to August 31, 1939, stood in the stock book of Silesian in the name of Non Ferrum, Zurich, Switzerland, a Swiss corporation, which held the stock for the benefit of Bergwerksgesellschaft Georg von Giesche's Erben, a German corporation. This action effectively put a stop to Schulte’s repatriation scheme.

== The post-war times ==
Before Silesian-American was finally dissolved, it took part in several legal proceedings in the 1950s.
