= Szlama Ber Winer =

Holocaust victim (1911–1942)

- Born: 23 September 1911; Izbica Kujawska, German Empire
- Died: c. April 10, 1942 (aged 30); Bełżec death camp, German occupied-Poland
- Other name: Yakov Grojanowski
- Known for: Holocaust deposition called the Grojanowski Report

Szlama Ber Winer, nom de guerre Yakov (Ya'akov) Grojanowski (23 September 1911 – c. 10 April 1942), was a Polish Jew from Izbica Kujawska, who escaped from the Chełmno extermination camp during the Holocaust in German-occupied Poland. Szlamek (the diminutive form of Szlama) is sometimes incorrectly referred to as Szlamek Bajler in literature by the surname of his nephew, Abram Bajler, from Zamość (see postcard). Szlama Ber Winer escaped from the Waldlager work commando at Chełmno (German: Kulmhof), and described in writing the atrocities he witnessed at that extermination camp, not long before his own subsequent murder at the age of 30, in the gas chambers of Bełżec. The original testimony transcribed from Winer's testimony is called 'The Account of a Forced Grave Digger' and was recovered from the Ringelblum Archive after the war. This material was reworked (to hide the identity of escaped survivors) and transmitted through the Polish underground. The deposition that was sent out through the underground is commonly known as the Grojanowski Report.

== Life ==
Szlama Ber (Szlamek) was born in Izbica Kujawska near Koło on 23 September 1911 (or the 10th, in Julian calendar) to a Jewish merchant Iccak Wolf Winer (35 years of age) and Srenca née Laskow, his lawful wife according to the birth certificate from the Office of Public Records. They lived in Izbica just north of Chełmno before the Holocaust. It was an area of interwar Poland which had been annexed in 1939 by Nazi Germany as part of the new territory of Reichsgau Wartheland earmarked for complete "Germanization". In 1940 the Nazis created a ghetto in Izbica for 1,000–1,600 Jews. On 12 January 1942 Winer was deported to Chełmno extermination camp, to slave labour with the camp's Sonderkommando. Two days later, the Izbica Ghetto was liquidated through deportations of 900–1,000 others to extermination on 14–15 January 1942. Szlamek was spared but witnessed the death of his own family in the gas vans. He was assigned by the SS to the burial commando. On Monday, 19 January, Szlamek escaped by slipping out of a lorry on the way to the Rzuchów forest subcamp.

=== The report ===
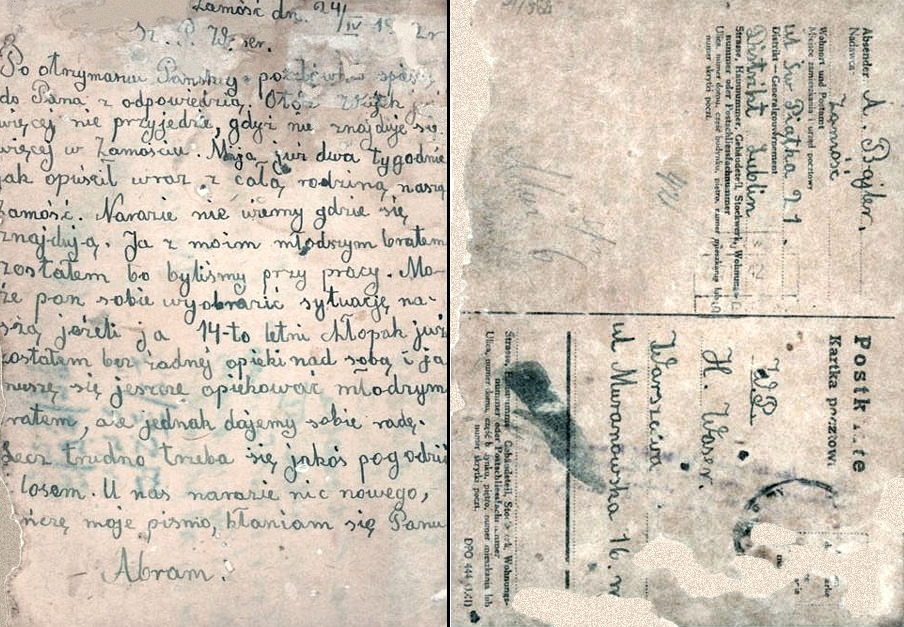
Postcard sent to Warsaw by Abram Bajler, nephew of Szlamek Winer, informing about the final deportation of his uncle with family

Szlamek managed to make his way from Chełmno to the Warsaw Ghetto in the General Government part of occupied Poland. He contacted the clandestine Oneg Shabbat group, headed by Emanuel Ringelblum, and gave detailed information about his harrowing experience with the camp's Sonderkommando. He described the entire extermination procedure at Chełmno step-by-step: how the people who arrived were murdered in gas vans; the constant beatings by the SS; how the inside of the vans was cleaned between loads, and how the bodies were buried in deep dug-out mass graves. Szlamek also described the brutal treatment of prisoners forced to deal with the dead, and his escape from the camp. Winer wrote the Grojanowski Report on the request of Oneg Shabbat who sent its Polish version to the Delegatura (the underground representatives of the Polish government-in-exile), while the German copy was produced for the German people in the hope that it would evoke more compassion for the Jews in them.

Wanted by the Gestapo, Szlama Ber Winer was whisked to Zamość where subsequently he also wrote back to his friends at the Warsaw Ghetto about the existence of a death camp in Bełżec a mere 44 kilometres (27 mi) south of the city. A few days after writing this last communiqué, around the 10th of April 1942, he was apprehended together with members of his extended family, and deported to the Bełżec extermination camp along with some 3,000 Jews of the Zamość Ghetto, marched from the market place to the awaiting Holocaust trains at the station. Two weeks later, the 14-year-old nephew of Szlama Winer, Abram Bajler, wrote a postcard from Zamość to Warsaw – sent on 24 April 1942 – after the deportation of his own uncle to the death camp. The message reads:

Zamość, 24 April 1942

Dear Mr Waser. After receiving your postcard, I hasten to reply. Albeit, my Uncle will never come, because he is not in Zamość anymore. Two weeks have already passed since he left town together with the rest of our family. For now, we don't know where they are. I was left behind with my younger brother because we were at work at the time. Try to imagine our situation with myself the 14-year-old boy left alone without care or supervision, and made responsible for the well-being of my little brother; but we manage somehow, because we have no choice. We have to accept what's given us. There's no other news. Greetings — Abram.

Zamość dn 24 / IV 1942 r
Sz.P. Waser. Po otrzymaniu Pańskiej pocztówki śpieszę do Pana z odpowiedzią. Otóż Wujek już więcej nie przyjedzie, gdyż nie znajduje się więcej w Zamościu. Mija już dwa tygodnie jak opuścił wraz z całą rodziną naszą Zamość. Narazie nie wiemy gdzie się znajdują. Ja z moim młodszym bratem zostałem bo byliśmy przy pracy. Może pan sobie wyobrazić sytuację naszą jeżeli ja 14-to letni chłopak już zostałem bez żadnej opieki nad sobą i ja muszę się jeszcze opiekować młodszym bratem, ale jednak dajemy sobie radę. Lecz trudno trzeba się jakoś pogodzić z losem. U nas narazie nic nowego, kończę moje pismo, kłaniam się Panu. — Abram.

== See also ==
- Jewish ghettos in German-occupied Poland
- The Holocaust in Poland
- Bibliography of the Holocaust § Primary sources
