= Giesche =

Giesche Corp.
- Native name: Giesche Spolka Akcyjna
- Formerly: Bergwerksgesellschaft Georg von Giesche's Erben (predecessor holdings)
- Type: Public company (formerly); State-owned (post-WWII)
- Industry: Mining, Metallurgy, Agriculture, Forestry
- Founded: 1922 (as Polish corporation); holdings active since 1704
- Founder: Giesche's Erben (original holdings)
- Defunct: Yes
- Fate: Nationalized by Polish government in 1946; assets paid off in 1967.
- Headquarters: Katowice, Poland (interwar period)
- Area served: Upper Silesia (Poland, interwar period)
- Products: Zinc, Bituminous coal
- Services: Mining, smelting, rolling mills, manufacturing, agricultural and forestry operations
- Total assets: $21,550,000 (1926 valuation under Silesian-American Corporation)
- Owner: Bergwerksgesellschaft Georg von Giesche's Erben (German, majority pre-1926, minority post-1926); Silesian-American Corporation (US-led, majority 1926-1939); German 'Commissar'/Giesche's Erben (de facto during WWII); Polish Communist Government (post-WWII)
- Number of employees: ~20,000

Giesche Corp. (Giesche Spolka Akcyjna) was, during the interwar period, part of and owned by the German firm of Bergwerksgesellschaft Georg von Giesche's Erben (commonly called Giesche's Erben) and represented those holdings of Giesche's Erben, that after the implementation of the Treaty of Versailles with re-establishment of the Republic of Poland in 1922, were now in Polish territory; registration at Katowice as a Polish corporation followed with a name that had been registered in Prussia about 1907. The corporation was one of the largest mining concerns operating in Upper Silesia, Poland, during interwar. It had the largest Polish zinc output (40% of Poland's zinc production) out of the largest zinc mines in Europe. It was one of the largest bituminous coal producers (3,500,000 tons yearly). It had smelters and rolling mills, factories and agricultural and forests properties. Its largest zinc mine was the White Sharley/Bleischarley Its biggest zinc mills were Giesche (later known as Szopienice) and Wilhelmina. The largest coal mines were Giesche (later known as Janow and thereafter Wieczorek) and Kleofas. All the former property of Giesche's Erben in Upper Silesia, owned and operated by the Giesche family since 1704. It employed nearly 20,000 workers, for which housing quarters were built, today the monumental district of Katowice.

== History ==
For practical reasons, the Polish properties were transferred to Giesche but their operation seem to have been financially unsuccessful. This was in part because Poland had levied a heavy tax on Giesche and it became difficult to borrow German funds to pay these taxes; so the money was sought through a sale of the company to U.S. investors in 1926.

== American ownership ==
Giesche's Erben negotiated with Anaconda Copper Mining Corp. and W. Averell Harriman for a swap out of all Giesche capital stock of the new company called the Silesian-American Corporation; to be registered as the Silesian Holding Company in Delaware, United States. Anaconda and Harriman would hold a majority share while Giesche Erben retained a minority share. The Giesche purchase was carried on the first Silesian-American balance sheet at $21,550,000.

== World War II ==
In late 1939, Germany occupied Polish territory including the entire Silesian area. By 1940, American management in Silesian-American was eliminated and the last general manager left for Switzerland. The company had been under the supervision of the German 'Commissar' or trustee, Dr. Albrecht Jung, head of Giesche's Erben legal department. Direct operations were maintained by Dr. Eduard Schulte, Giesche's Erben general manager, and his deputy, Dr. Lothar Siemon. Giesche's Erben could do what they pleased with the company without any direct interaction with the majority shareholders. But Giesche's Erben realized they did not have absolute legal control so they attempted to own all capital stock of Silesian-American—without success.

== Post-war ==
The communist government of Poland on January 3, 1946, nationalized certain of its industries, including Silesian-American properties were nationalized and the company’s activity was suspended. In 1967 the assets were paid off.

== Sources ==
- United States Court of Appeals Second Circuit, December 26, 1950. Conway v. Silesian-American Corp. (which may be found at )
- Sixteenth Annual Report of the Securities and Exchange Commission, Fiscal Year Ended June 30, 1950, United States Government Printing Office, Washington: 1950 (which may be found at )
- U.S. Supreme Court December 8, 1947 Silesian American Corporation v. Clark (which may be found at )
- United States Court of Appeals Second Circuit April 13, 1953 Conway v. Union Bank of Switzerland (which may be found at )
- United States Court of Appeals Second Circuit, Second Circuit. July 3, 1946 Silesian-American Corporation et al. v. Markham, Alien Property Custodian (which may be found at )
- United States Court of Appeals Second Circuit December 6, 1956 Scribner & Miller v. Francis Conway, Trustee of Silesian-American Corporation (which may be found at )
- "Industrial Penetration". Time. June 14, 1926.
- Jaros, Jerzy (1983). Tajemnice górnośląskich koncernów [Secrets of Upper Silesian Corporations]. Śląski Instytut Naukowy, Katowice (in Polish)

Also a lot of Polish language sources, concerning mainly the history of Silesian industry, the history of Katowice and its districts, web pages of particular Polish coal mines. For example: http://www.giszowiec.sewera.pl/ and.
