= Kyburg =

Kyburg may refer to:

- Henry E. Kyburg, Jr. (1928–2007), philosopher/logician
- Kyburg, Zürich, a town in the Canton of Zürich, Switzerland
- Kyburg (castle), a castle in the municipality Kyburg, Switzerland
- House of Kyburg that took their name from the castle
- County of Kyburg, a former administrative unit in the Canton of Zürich, Switzerland
- Kyburg-Buchegg, a municipality in the Canton of Solothurn, Switzerland
