= Kyburg family =

Medieval Swiss noble family

Kyburg
- Coat of arms (mid 13th century)
- Parent house: Dillingen
- Country: Duchy of Swabia
- Founded: 1180
- Founder: Hartmann III von Kyburg
- Final ruler: Hartmann IV von Kyburg
- Titles: Count of Kyburg
- Estate: County of Kyburg
- Dissolution: 1264

The Kyburg family (/ˈkaɪbɜːrɡ/; German: [ˈkyːbʊʁk]; also Kiburg) was a noble family of grafen (counts) in the Duchy of Swabia, a cadet line of the counts of Dillingen, who in the late 12th and early 13th centuries ruled the County of Kyburg, corresponding to much of what is now Northeastern Switzerland.

The family was one of the four most powerful noble families in the Swiss Plateau (beside the House of Habsburg, the House of Zähringen and the House of Savoy) during the 12th century. With the extinction of the Kyburg family's male line in 1264, Rudolph of Habsburg laid claim to the Kyburg lands and annexed them to the Habsburg holdings, establishing the line of "Neu-Kyburg", which was in turn extinct in 1417.

== History ==
=== Early history ===
The first line of counts of Kyburg were influential in local politics during the 1020s, but the male line died out in 1078. Kyburg castle, southeast of Winterthur (in the modern canton of Zürich), passed on to the Swabian counts of Dillingen. Through the marriage of Hartmann von Dillingen (d. 1121) with a certain Adelheid, the House of Dillingen acquired the old Kyburg possessions as well as territorial claims in the Thurgau. The exact origin of Adelheid is unclear. She is either the granddaughter of the Count of Grüningen-Winterthur or from a cadet branch of the Winterthur family, the Counts of Nellenburg. She might also be the daughter of Adalbert II von Winterthur (died 1053), the last knight from Winterthur, who died in 1053 at the Battle of Civitate against the Normans.

=== Expansion of the Kyburg lands ===
The Kyburg land continued to be part of the possessions of the House of Dillingen until the grandson of Hartmann von Dillingen, Hartmann III (d. 1180), split the Dillingen lands. Adalbert (died 1170) received the Swabian territories, while Hartmann III von Dillingen got the Swiss lands and became Hartmann I of Kyburg. The House of Kyburg were vassals of the Duke of Swabia, who was of the House of Hohenstaufen and would become the Kings of Germany from 1138–1254. When the House of Lenzburg died out in 1172/73, the Kyburgs together with the Hohenstaufen and Zähringen split the Lenzburg possessions between them. The Kyburg family acquired the allodial title to the Vogtei of Windegg or Gaster (today 7 municipalities in the See-Gaster Wahlkreis of St. Gallen) and land around Baden. Later additional Lenzburg territories, the Schänis Abbey and Beromünster, were also acquired by the House of Kyburg.

In 1180 the family began to consolidate their power. They founded the cities of Diessenhofen and Winterthur to help spread their power. They also appointed many of the Lenzburg, and later Zähringen, vassals to be unfree knights or Ministerialis for the Kyburg family.

When the Zähringen family died out in 1218, the Kyburgs grabbed another chance to expand. Anna von Zähringen, the sister of the last Duke of Zähringen, Berthold V, was the wife of Ulrich III von Kyburg (†1227). From the Zähringen line the Kyburgs acquired land west of the Rhine and in Burgundy including the cities of Fribourg, Thun and Burgdorf as well as estates in the canton of Zurich. However, the House of Hohenstaufen, the family of the Holy Roman Emperors, refused to support the Kyburg claims on the city of Zurich and in 1226 on the Abbey of St. Gall. As a result, they turned increasingly away from the Hohenstaufens and in 1243 and were one of the mainstays of the pro-Pope and anti-Holy Roman Emperor Party.

Around 1220 they started to make claims on property and rights that had unclear ownership and was near property that they already owned. In 1225 they founded a burial site for the Chorherrenstift Heiligberg in the center of the property of the former Freiherr von Weisslingen at Winterthur, and in 1233 founded Töss Abbey west of Winterthur. Both sites were endowed with property that they had taken from the Weisslingen and Rossberg families. These two properties served to define the borders between the Kyburg and Rapperswil families.

At the same time the Kyburg family attempted to strengthen themselves through marriage. Hartmann V, a grandson of Ulrich III was engaged to Anna of Rapperswil in 1227. His uncle, Hartmann IV, called the Elder, married Margaret of Savoy while his sister Heilwig, the future mother of King Rudolf I von Habsburg, married Albert IV of Habsburg.

Even though the family continued to found cities and expand, they were declining in power. In 1230 they founded Zug and Baden, then Frauenfeld, Aarau, Lenzburg, and Mellingen. In 1250 they founded Sursee, Weesen and the fortified towns of Kyburg and Laupen. The last two were Richensee and Huttwil which they lost shortly thereafter.

== Neu-Kyburg ==
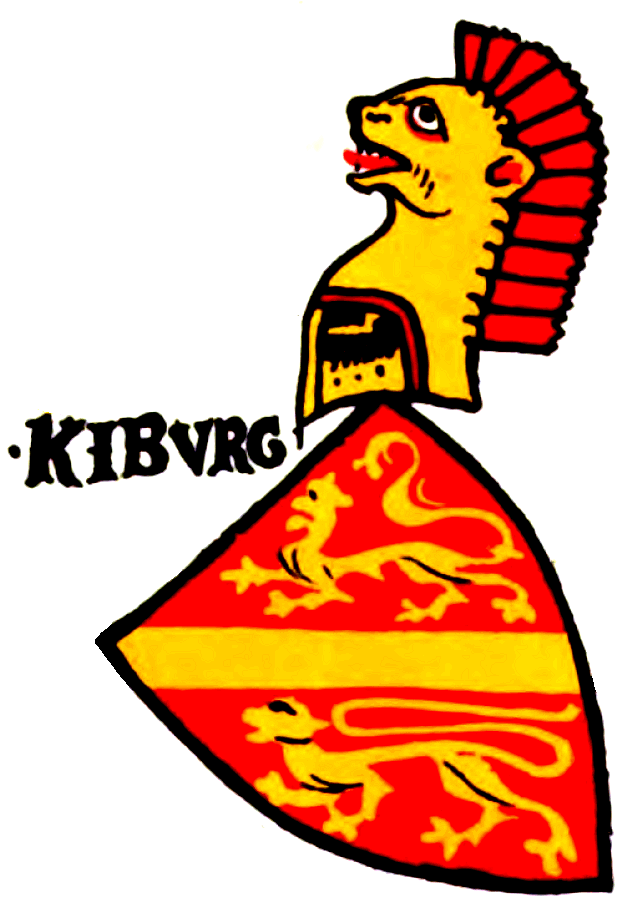
Arms of the Grafen von Kyburg in the Zürich armorial, c. 1340

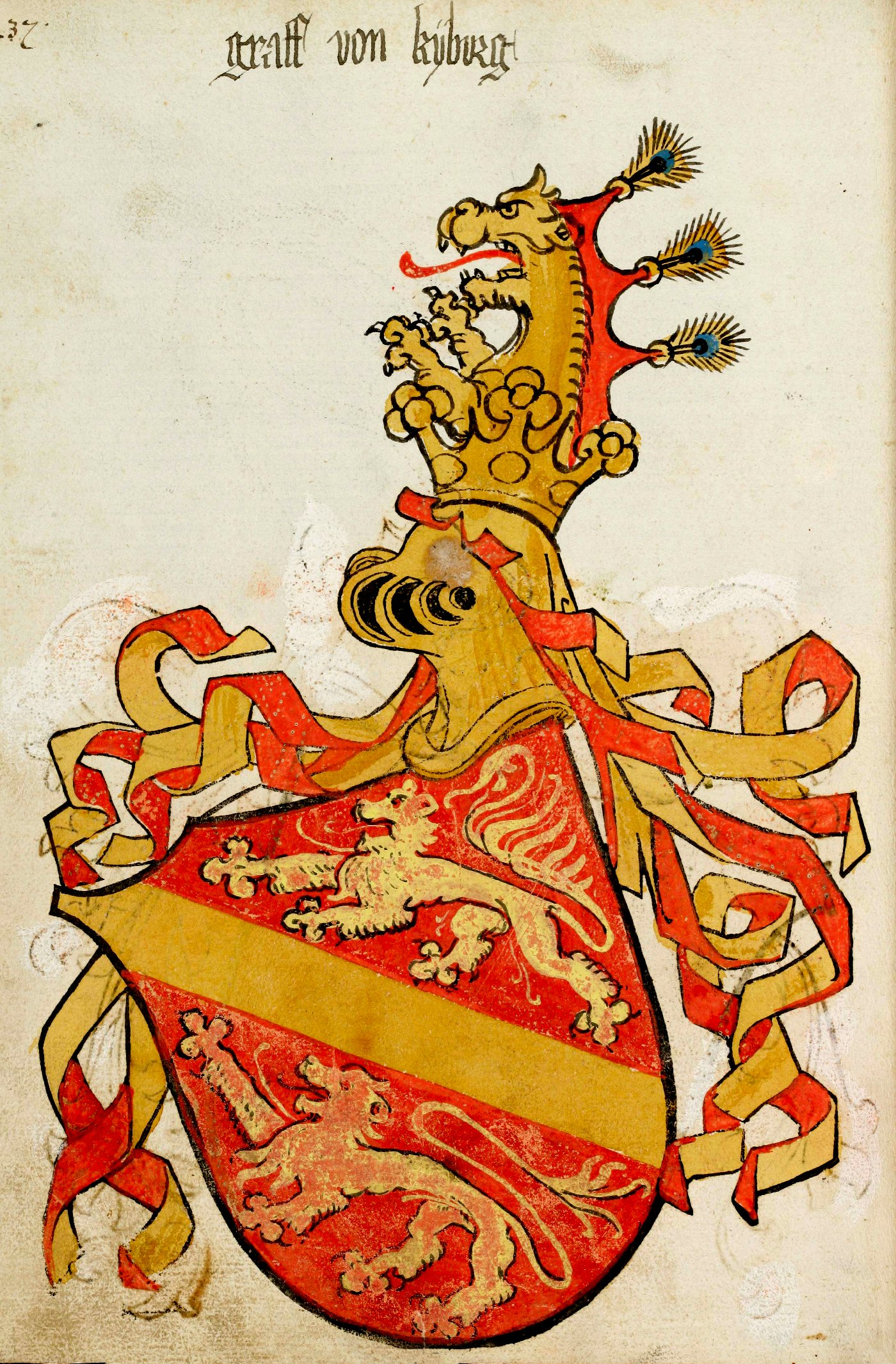
Comital arms from the Wappenbuch of Ulrich Rösch, abbot of St. Gall (r. 1463–1491).

In 1250/51 the childless Hartmann IV gave the western part of the property with the center of Burgdorf to his nephew Hartmann V. As a result, Hartmann V, who was supported by the Habsburgs, came into conflict repeatedly with the growing city-state of Bern. His uncle had to step in often to keep the peace. When Hartmann V died in 1263, Count Rudolf von Habsburg became the guardian of Hartmann's daughter Anna, and also took over the administration of the western section. In 1264, after the death of Hartman IV, Rudolf stepped in to control the eastern half as well. Though this brought him into conflict with the claims by the widow Margaret of Savoy and her family.

Anna, daughter of Hartmann V, married Eberhard I of Habsburg-Laufenburg. This marriage was intended to secure Habsburg interests in Aargau (Argovia) against Savoy. The son of Eberhard and Anna, Hartmann I (1275–1301) again called himself "of Kyburg". His line came to be known as that of Neu-Kyburg or Kyburg-Burgdorf, persisting until 1417.

In 1322, the brothers Eberhard II and Hartmann II started fighting with each other over who would inherit the undivided lands. The fighting led to the "fratricide at Thun Castle" where Eberhard killed his brother Hartmann. To avoid punishment by his Habsburg overlords, Eberhard fled to Bern. In the following year, he sold the town of Thun, its castle and the land surrounding Thun to Bern. Bern granted the land back to Eberhard as a fief.

The decline of Neu-Kyburg began with a failed raid by Rudolf II on Solothurn, on 11 November 1382. The ensuing conflict with the Old Swiss Confederacy is known as the Burgdorferkrieg (also Kyburgerkrieg). Bern took the opportunity to assert its interests in Aargau against the Habsburgs, and after the Bernese laid siege to Burgdorf, Neu-Kyburg was forced to concede an unfavourable peace. Friedrich V, count of Toggenburg acquired Kyburg and Winterthur in 1384 (lost again in 1402 by Friedrich VII), and Bern bought Thun and Burgdorf, the most important cities of Neu-Kyburg, and their remaining towns passed to Bern and Solothurn by 1408. The last of the Neu-Kyburgs, Berchtold, died destitute in Bern in 1417.

== Bailiwick of Kyburg ==
The Bailiwick of Kyburg within the Zürichgau in the 18th century

With the extinction of the comital line, the county passed back to the direct possession of Frederick IV, Duke of Austria, who was forced to sell the county to Zürich in 1424. In the Old Zürich War, most of the territory was given to emperor Frederick III, with only the Neuamt west of the Glatt river remaining with Zürich. However, the Habsburgs again agreed to sell the county to Zürich in 1452. From this time until the French invasion in 1798, the territory was a bailiwick (Landvogtei) administered by a total of 59 successive reeves (Landvögte). The town of Winterthur remained with Habsburg until 1467, when it was bought by Zürich and treated as a separate jurisdiction.

In 1815, Kyburg castle was again made the seat of regional administration (Oberamt). With the creation of the modern Canton of Zürich in 1831, Kyburg lost its administrative role, and the castle was sold to one Franz Heinrich Hirzel of Winterthur who intended to use it as a quarry. To prevent its destruction, the castle was bought by the exiled Polish count Alexander Sobansky (1799–1861) in 1835.

The bailiwick of Kyburg within the Zürichgau was divided into four Ämter:

- Niederamt (or Unteramt) between Glatt and Töss as far as Oberembrach-Bassersdorf.
- Oberamt south of the Töss
- Enneramt between Töss and Thur
- Ausseramt between Thur and Rhine

To this were added two Nebenämter,

- Embracheramt (Embrach, Oberembrach, Lufingen)
- Illnaueramt (Kyburg, Illnau, Brütten, Lindau, Volketswil)

Not part the four Ämter were Wangen and Töss, and the exclaves Ettenhausen and Ebmatingen.

== Family tree of the Kyburg family ==
HOUSE OF; DILLINGEN	HOUSE OF; LENZBURG	HOUSE OF; ZÄHRINGEN	HOUSE OF; HABSBURG
Hartmann I of Dillingen † 1121	Adelheid of Winterthur
Hartmann II † 1134	Ulrich † 1127; Bishop of Konstanz	Adalbert † 1170	Richenza of Lenzburg-Baden
Hartmann III before 1152 † 1180	Richinza of Lenzburg
Ulrich III of Kyburg before 1183 † 1227	Anna of Zähringen
Ulrich, Bishop of Chur; Bishop 1233-1237	Alice of Lothringen	Werner † 1228 on Crusade	Hartman IV; 1213-1264	Margaretha of Savoy †1273	Hedwig of Kyburg	Albert IV, Count of Habsburg † 1239
Anna of Rapperschwyl †1253	Hartmann V 1218-1263	Elizabeth of Chalon	Rudolph of Habsburg; 1218–1291; King of the Romans 1273-1291
Werner †infant	Anna	Eberhard von Habsburg-Laufenburg; 1227-1284	Habsburg Kings and Holy Roman Emperors
Counts of Neu-Kyburg or Kyburg-Burgdorf line extinguished 1418

== Family tree of the Neu-Kyburg family ==
Anna
Margaretha married Dietrich VII of Cleves

Eberhard von Habsburg-Laufenburg; 1227-1284
Eberhard I †before 1290	Peter illegitimate Vogt of Oltingen	Hartmann I c.1275-1301	Elisabeth of Freiburg c.1280-1322
Margaritha of Neuchâtel	Hartmann II †1322 murdered by Eberhard II	Eberhard II †17 April 1357	Anastasia of Signau c. 1313-1382	Katherina married Albrecht of Werdenberg
Eberhard III	Eberhard IV †14 July 1395	Anna of Nidau	Hartmann III	Berchtold †1417; Last of the Neu-Kyburg line
Ego II sold his title in 1406 †c.1415	Rudolph II †1383
