= Battle at Brůdek =

Battle fought between Henry III and Břetislav I (August 1040)

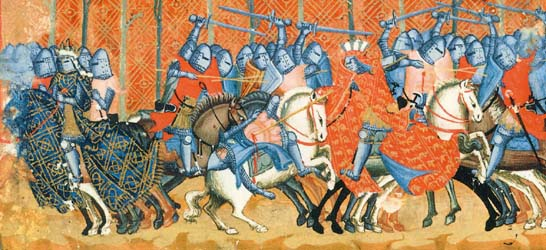
- Miniature illustration of the battle from the Chronicle of Dalimil (14th century)
Date	22/23 August 1040
Location	Upper Palatine Forest 49.487°N 12.738°E
Result	Bohemian victory

Belligerents
Holy Roman Empire	Duchy of Bohemia; Kingdom of Hungary

Commanders and leaders
Henry III; Otto of Schweinfurt; Werner of Maden †	Břetislav I

Casualties and losses
Heavy	Unknown

The Battle at Brůdek (Czech bitva u Brůdku; German Schlacht bei Stokau, Schlacht bei Biwanka) was fought between Henry III, King of the Romans, and Břetislav I, Duke of Bohemia, on 22/23 August 1040. The battle took place in the Upper Palatine Forest in what is now the Domažlice District of Plzeň Region, Czech Republic.

Břetislav was leading a campaign against Poland in 1039, and after he conquered Gniezno, he removed the relics of Adalbert of Prague to Prague, intended as a move to establish a separate archbishopric there, in order to secede from the jurisdiction of the archbishop of Mainz. Archbishop Bardo complained about this to Henry, who was already unhappy with Břetislav's war against Poland, as both Bohemia and Poland were nominally vassal of the Holy Roman Empire. Břetislav agreed to send his son Spytihněv as a hostage to the court of the king, however because he refused the payment of a tribute requested by Henry, the king moved against Bohemia with two armies.

Břetislav had won a respite by offering his son as hostage, which he used to gain the support of Peter, King of Hungary, who sent 3,000 support troops. Břetislav also fortified the passes of the Bohemian Forest and intended to ambush Henry, who was anticipating the attack and moved in several detachments. When Henry located the intended ambush, he sent a vanguard of 1,000 men into a side valley of the Chamb in order to enclose the enemy. This vanguard, led by Werner I of Maden, count of Winterthur, the bearer of the imperial banner, was caught up in the prepared sconces and almost completely destroyed. Henry's second wing, led by margrave Otto of Schweinfurt, was forced to retreat with heavy losses the following day.

Henry was forced to retreat, and sent Gunther of Bohemia with orders to Eckard II, Margrave of Meissen, who was leading a Saxon force invading Bohemia from the north, to do likewise. Eckard negotiated a retreat some two weeks after.

Henry requested a truce, but was answered with the demand for unconditional surrender, so the king planned a second campaign for the following year. This turned out to be more successful, Henry succeeded in meeting with the Saxon forces before Prague on 8 September and Břetislav was forced to surrender on 29 September 1041.

An inscription found in the church at Valtířov, Nový Kramolín mentions Henry III as founder of Stockau Abbey in 1041. A legend of the 18th century connects the name of Stockau to a tree stump (Stock) on which the king supposedly rested during the battle. The altar of the abbey's church was supposed to correspond to the location of this tree stump. The chapel of St. Wenceslas in Brůdek, Všeruby municipality is said to have been built by Břetislav in 1047 to commemorate the battle. The original wooden building was replaced in the 14th century, and again rebuilt during 1669–71 (restored 1878–90).
