= Reichsbanner =

Reichsbanner ("banner of the realm/empire") may refer to:

- the Reichsbanner of the crusader-era, later known as Reichssturmfahne ("imperial war flag")
- Reichsbanner Schwarz-Rot-Gold, a 1920s German political organisation
