= County of Kyburg =

Swiss county from 11th to 18th century

County/Bailiwick of Kyburg Grafschaft/Landvogtei Kyburg
- 1053–1798
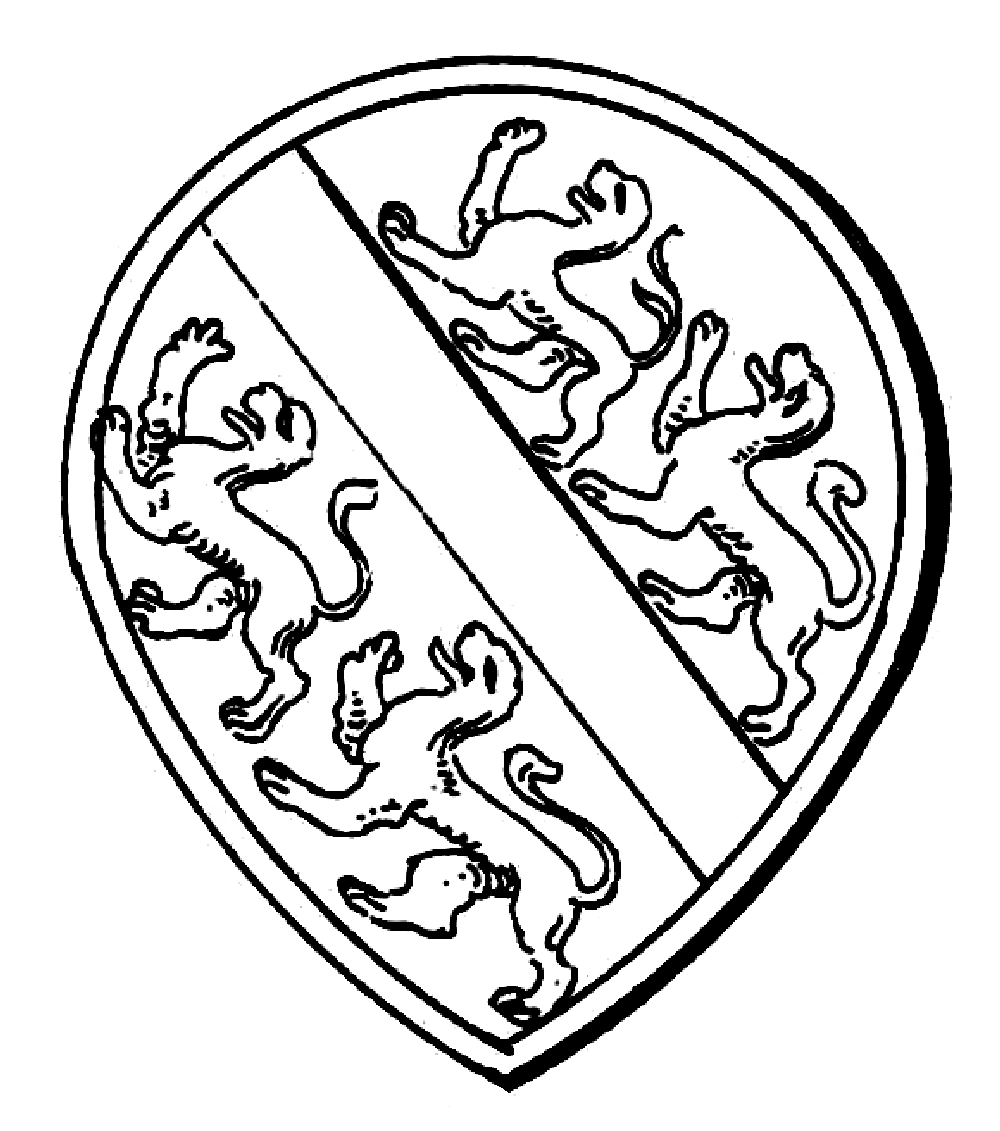
- Coat of arms (c.1180–1230) Coat of arms (after 1263)

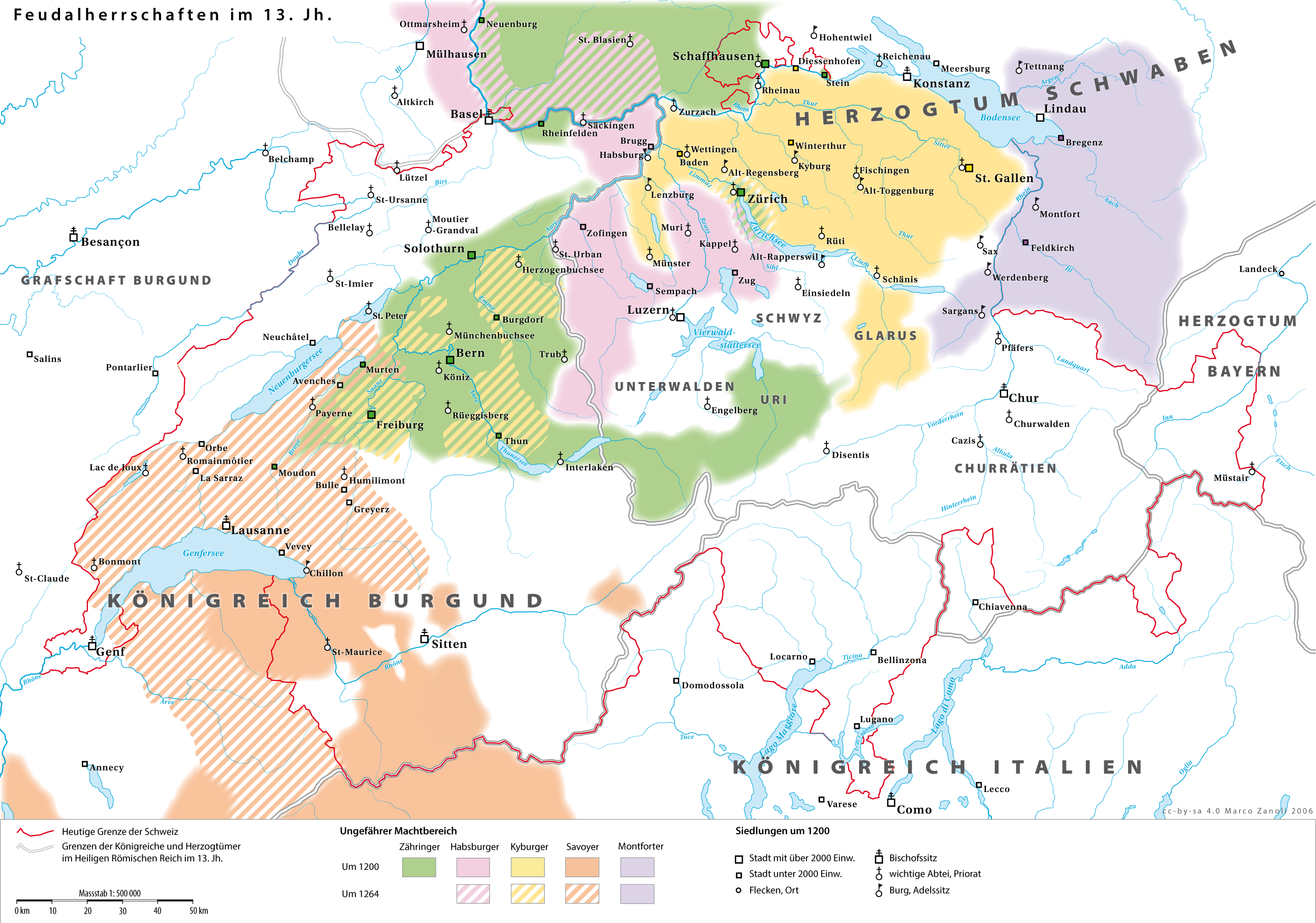
- Feudal territories in Switzerland c. 1200. The territory of the house of Kyburg, including their terrories inherited from Lenzburg in 1173, is shown in yellow.
- Capital: Kyburg
- Government: Feudalism
- Graf
  - d. 1121: Hartmann I. von Dillingen
- Landvogt
  - 1795–1798: Hans Caspar Ulrich
- History
  - Death of Adalbert II von Winterthur: 1053
  - Inheritance from Lenzburg: 1173
  - Comital line extinct: 1264
  - Burgdorferkrieg: 1383
  - Neu-Kyburg line extinct: 1417
  - Landvogtei of Zürich: 1452
  - Disestablished: 1798
Preceded by	Succeeded by
Counts of Winterthur	Helvetic Republic / Helvetic Republic

The County of Kyburg probably came into existence in the 11th century and is first mentioned in 1027. After 1053 it was a possession of the counts of Dillingen. It was greatly expanded with the extinction of the House of Lenzburg in 1173.

During 1180–1250, the counts of Kyburg existed as a separate cadet line of the counts of Dillingen. The county was ruled by Hartmann V, nephew of the last count of Kyburg in the agnatic line, during 1251–1263. It then passed to the House of Habsburg as possession of the counts of Neu-Kyburg (also Kyburg-Burgdorf) after the extinction of the agnatic line of the House of Kyburg, until the extinction of Neu-Kyburg in 1417. It then passed under direct Habsburg suzerainty, then briefly to Zürich (1424–1442), to emperor Frederick III (1442–1452) and back to Zürich in 1452, from which time it was administered as a bailiwick (Landvogtei) of Zürich until the establishment of the Helvetic Republic in 1798.

Despite not being in possession anymore, the Habsburg monarchs continued carrying the historic title of "Princely Count of Kyburg" in the grand title of the Emperor of Austria.

== Creation of the county ==
The first mention of Kyburg Castle was in 1027 when Emperor Conrad II destroyed the Chuigeburch. By 1096 the Counts of Dillingen also included Count of Kyburg as one of their titles. By 1180 the family split into two lines, the Kyburgs and the Dillingens. The county expanded when the male line of the Counts of Lenzburg went extinct in 1173, followed by the Counts of Zähringen in 1218. From the Zähringen lands they inherited the cities of Thun, Burgdorf and Fribourg. Over the following decades they founded a number of towns including; Diessenhofen, Winterthur, Zug, Baden, Frauenfeld, Aarau, Mellingen, Lenzburg, Sursee, Weesen, Laupen, Richensee, Wangen an der Aare and Huttwil. However, in 1250, quarreling between Hartmann IV and his nephew Hartmann V led to dividing the county in half. Hartmann IV (the Elder) received the original County of Kyburg and all the Kyburg lands east of the Reuss river while Hartmann V (the Younger) received everything west of the Reuss as well as Zug and Arth.

== Under Habsburg rule ==
When Hartmann IV died without a male heir in 1264, the Count of Kyburg passed to Rudolf of Habsburg. The western Kyburg lands were sold to Rudolf in 1273 by Hartmann V's daughter Anna, but were permanently separated from the County of Kyburg. Initially after acquiring Kyburg Castle, Rudolf often directly ruled over the county from the castle. However, after his election to Emperor he only rarely returned to Kyburg. Over the following years, as the Habsburgs gained power in Austria, Kyburg went from a centerpiece of their power to a minor province. After 1364 the Habsburgs used Kyburg as collateral for loans or as a reward for vassals. In 1384 the county was pledged to the Counts of Toggenberg and in 1402 it was held by Kunigunde of Montfort-Bregenz. During the Appenzell Wars, the county was invaded in 1407 and the castle was besieged.

In 1424 the city of Zürich bought the county for 8,750 gulden. At the time it included the Kloten and Embrach regions and the modern day Districts of Winterthur and Pfäffikon (but not the city of Winterthur). During the Old Zürich War of 1442, Zürich returned the county to Austria in exchange for their support. It returned to Zürich in 1452 as collateral for a 17,000 gulden loan, which the Habsburgs never repaid. The Habsburgs continued to claim Kyburg as one of their titles until 1918.

== Part of Zürich ==
County of Kyburg in the Canton of Zürich, 1750

By acquiring the county, Zürich received a large area with rich farmland and a bewildering array of feudal laws, obligations and estates. By the 18th century the county still represented about half the territory of the entire canton. They divided the county into six administrative regions and appointed a Landvogt who ruled the entire county from Kyburg Castle. Under the Landvogt there were six Untervögte who administered the six regions. The position of Landvogt became a springboard to becoming a member of the city council or the mayor of Zürich. Beginning in 1535 the Landvogt was appointed by the council for a period of six years.

== End of the county ==
During the 1798 French invasion of Switzerland, local peasants rose up in rebellion and attacked Kyburg Castle. The French controlled Helvetic Republic swept away the old feudal organizations including the County of Kyburg. It was dissolved and the area divided between several new districts. After the fall of Napoleon and the restoration in Switzerland, Kyburg and Pfäffikon were combined into a district in 1815. However, it was short lived and in 1831 the district was dissolved and the administrative seat moved away from Kyburg Castle.
