= Gunther of Bohemia =

German Catholic hermit and diplomat

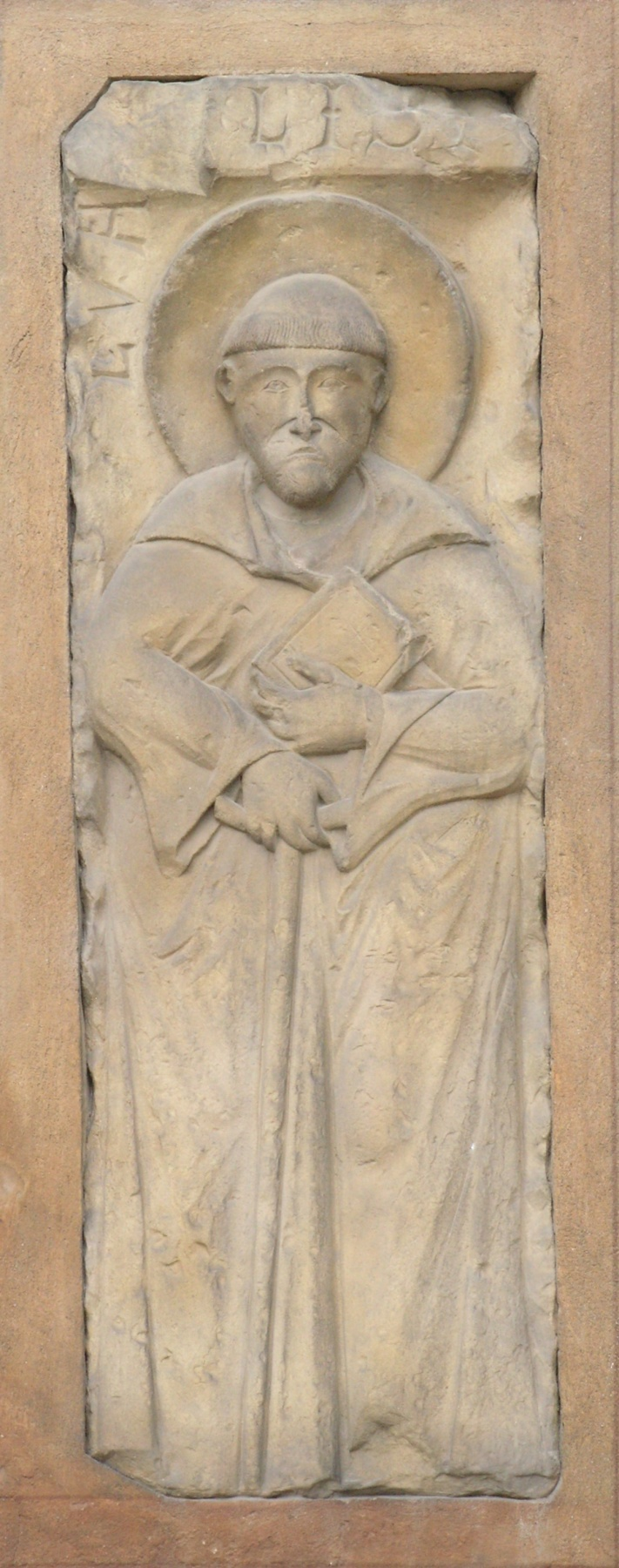
Gunther's tombstone, Břevnov Monastery (now in Prague)

Gunther (Czech: Vintíř; German: Günther; Hungarian: Günter; c. 955–1045) was a German (Bavarian) Catholic hermit and diplomat, who had quite important role in early history of Hungary and especially Bohemia, thanks to his good personal relationships with the rulers of those countries. In Czech, German, and Hungarian settings, he is venerated as a saint, his feast day is 9 October (Roman Martyrology 2004).

== Life ==
Gunther was born around 955 to a noble family, related to the imperial Ottonian dynasty as well as with the Hungarian Arpads. He was a Duke of Thuringia, and is numbered among the ancestors of the princely house of Schwarzburg. He spent the early part of his life at court in the midst of worldly pleasures and ambitious intrigues.

He was converted in 1005 at the age of fifty by Gotthard of Hildesheim, Abbot of Hersfeld, later Bishop of Hildesheim, and resolved to embrace the monastic life to do penance for his past faults. With the consent of his heirs, he bequeathed all his goods to the Abbey of Hersfeld, reserving the right to richly endow and maintain the monastery of Göllingen, the ownership of which he persisted in retaining despite all the efforts of Gotthard to prevent him. In 1006, the novice made a pilgrimage to Rome, and in the following year made his vows as a lay brother in the Niederaltaich Abbey before the Abbot Gotthard. Gunther helped to bring civilization to the region by clearing the forests and planting fields.

Soon afterwards, Gunther urgently entreated to be allowed to govern his monastery of Göllingen, and Gotthard's remonstrances could not turn him aside from his purpose. Shortly after his elevation to the abbacy, the former lay brother fell ill, and as he could not agree with his monks, the affairs of the monastery were soon in a perilous condition. By his charitable counsel, mingled with severe reprimands, Gotthard dispelled Gunther's ambitious aspirations, who once more returned to his humble condition at Niederaltaich and led an edifying life.

In 1008, he withdrew to a wild, steep place near Lalling in the Bavarian Forest, to live there as a hermit. In 1011, he penetrated farther north in the forest with several companions and settled at Rinchnach, where he built cells and a church of Saint John the Baptist.

It is said that Gunther received the gift of infused knowledge and became a powerful preacher, though deficient in ordinary ecclesiastical learning; he could probably neither read nor write. Wolfher, his biographer, relates that he knew him intimately, and often heard his admirable sermons on his patron, St John the Baptist—sermons which drew tears from all who heard them.

Gunther paid frequent visits to his relative, the Hungarian king, obtained large sums from him for the poor, and urged him to build several churches and monasteries. Mabillon has reproduced the deed of donation made by King Stephen I of Hungary on 6 June 1009. In 1029, Conrad II, Holy Roman Emperor, richly endowed the monastery of Rinchnach, and in 1040, Emperor Henry III affiliated it with Niederaltaich Abbey.

In his old age, Gunther was highly respected by the rulers of the Holy Roman Empire (Germany), Bohemia, Hungary, and Poland. This enabled him to mediate between the Bohemian and German factions in the conflict between Duke Bretislaus I of Bohemia and the German king Henry III, Holy Roman Emperor in 1040. Gunther was likely present at the German defeat in the Battle at Brůdek on 22/23 August 1040, and he was the leader of the delegation negotiating with Bretislaus at Chlumec in the aftermath of the battle.

Gunther died at about the age of ninety in the hermitage on Březník mountain (in today's Prášily municipality, near Hartmanice, southwestern Bohemia) on 10 October 1045, in the arms of Duke Bretislaus and of Šebíř, Bishop of Prague. He was buried in Břevnov Monastery, but his remains were destroyed by the Hussites in 1420.

== Legacy ==
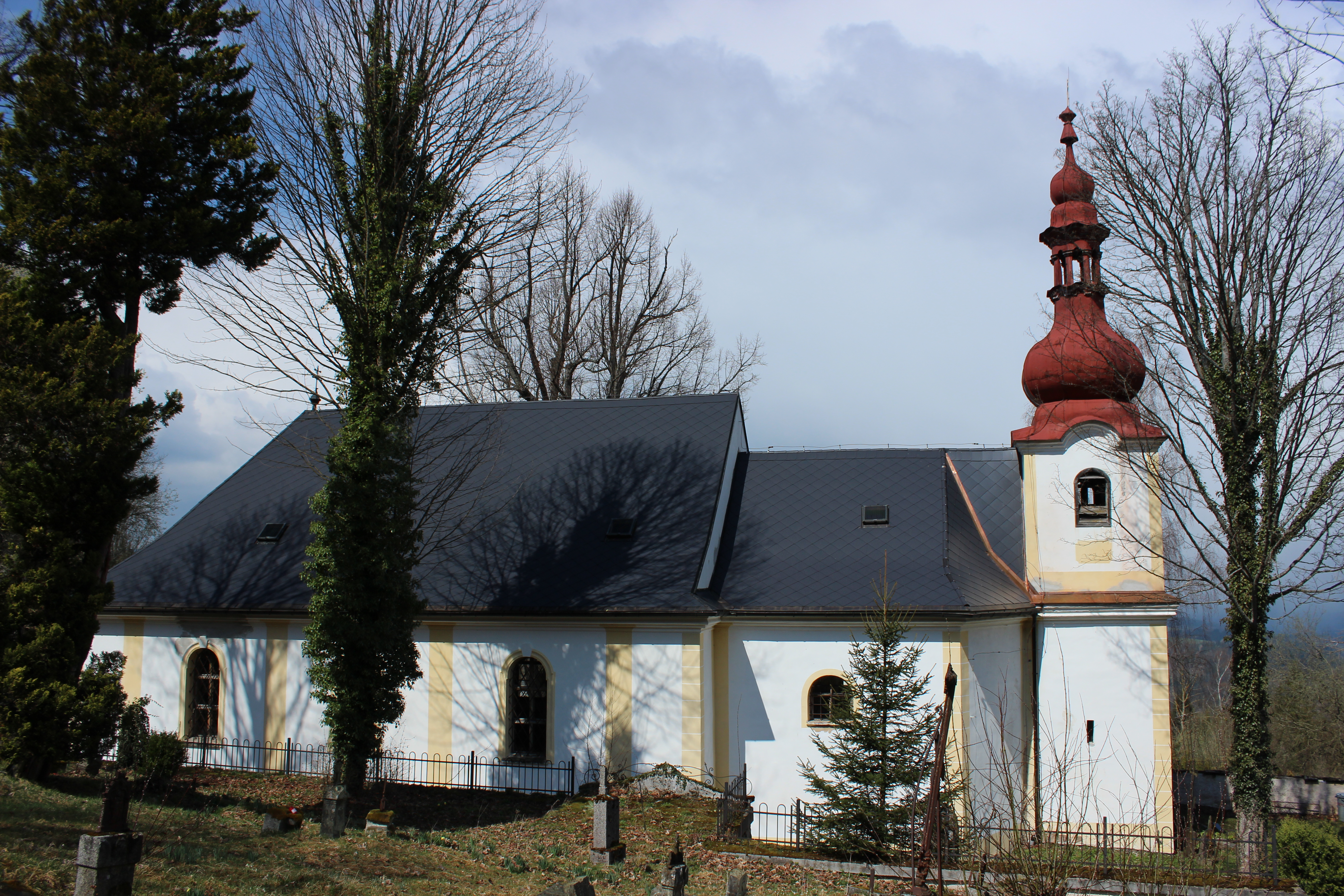
Church of St. Gunther in Hartmanice-Dobrá Voda

St. Gunther's Way (German: Gunthersteig; Czech: Vintířova stezka) is a walking holiday route that runs from Niederalteich Abbey on the Danube via Rinchnach and the Guntherstein into Bohemia. Departing from the Niederalteich Monastery on the Danube, the path goes deep into the Bavarian Forest and across the Czech border to hamlet Dobrá Voda (now part of town Hartmanice).

In that hamlet stands the only church in the world dedicated to this person, the Church of Saint Gunther, built in 1706–34 and carefully renovated through 1995, on the occasion of the 950th anniversary of Gunter's death. During the reconstruction, the interior of the church was newly created by Czech artist Vladimíra Tesařová in a unique way: altar, sacrificial table, lectern, crèche, Stations of the Cross, and the statue of Gunther himself are all cast from glass.

Also in Hungary can be found a reminder of Gunther: one of the two main churches in the town Mór, the Church of Holy Trinity, has a Baroque Gunther's statue (from 1744) in a niche on the right side of its portal facade.
