= Counts of Dillingen =

Swabian family during the Hupaldinger dynasty

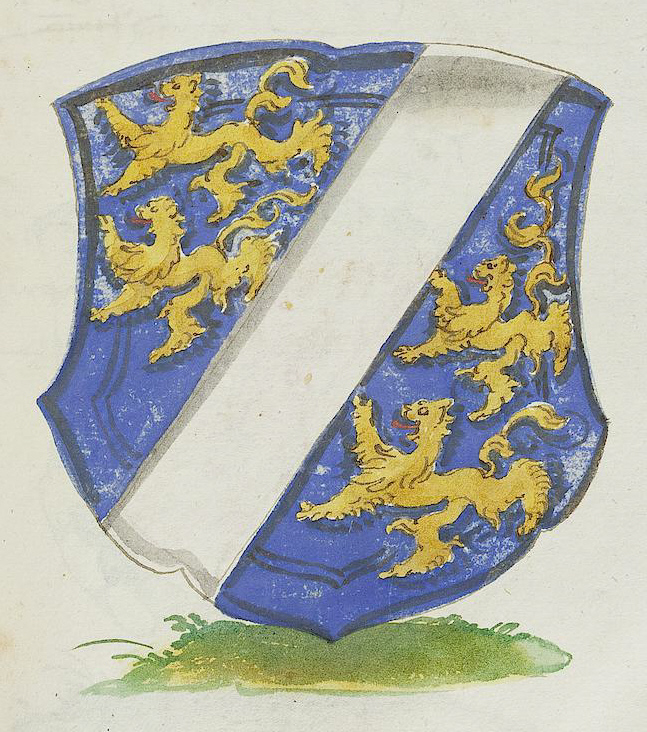
Coat of arms of Counts of Dillingen

The Counts of Dillingen were a Swabian comital family of the Hupaldinger (Hucpaldinger) dynasty during AD 955–1286.

== History ==
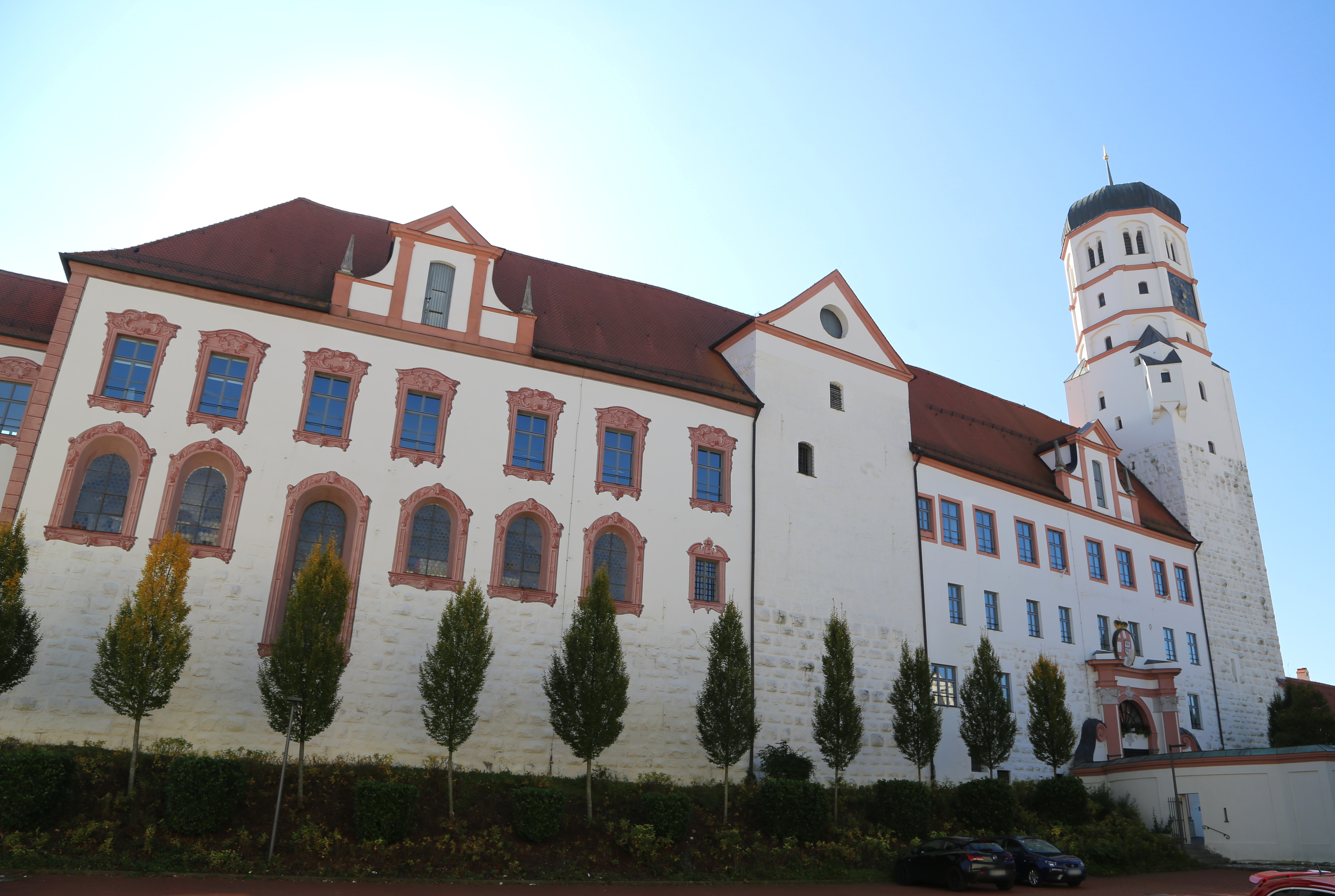
Castle Dillingen

The family originate in Wittislingen, with archaeological evidence of grave goods suggesting the presence of Alamannic nobility from at least the 7th century. They acquired substantial territory west of the Danube, between Gundelfingen and Donauwörth, by the second half of the 8th century.

The founder of the dynasty was Hucpald I who died in 910 and was succeeded by his son Dietpald I. Dietpald's brother Ulrich of Augsburg was appointed Prince-Bishopric of Augsburg in 923. Hucpald's daughter Heylwig married Herman I, Count Palatine of Lotharingia.

In 953, rebellion broke out led by King Otto's son, Liudolf, Duke of Swabia. The duchies of Bavaria, Swabia, and Franconia were in open civil war against the King, and even in his native Duchy of Saxony revolts began to spread. The Dillingens supported the king. In 954 Arnulf II, Count Palatine of Bavaria, laid siege to Augsburg, damaging the walls such that Bishop Ulrich retired to the fortress of Mantahinga. Arnulf then laid siege to Mantahinga, but was surprised by a dawn attack by Count Dietpald's relief force. The rebels were soundly defeated and Swabia returned to royal control.

When the Magyars invaded in August 955, they laid siege to Augsburg. Ulrich and his forces put up a staunch resistance, providing King Otto time to make his defense. When the Magyars learned of Otto's approach, they suspended the siege to regroup. As the Hungarians departed, Ulrich's brother, Count Dietpald I used the opportunity to lead soldiers to Otto's camp during the night. Dietpald was killed in the subsequent battle.

Dietpald's son Richwin was given the inheritance of his father as comitatus (i.e. with the rank of comes "count") by Otto the Great. The Hupalding counts built Dillingen castle in the late 9th or early 10th century, and Dillingen had become their main seat by the late 10th century.

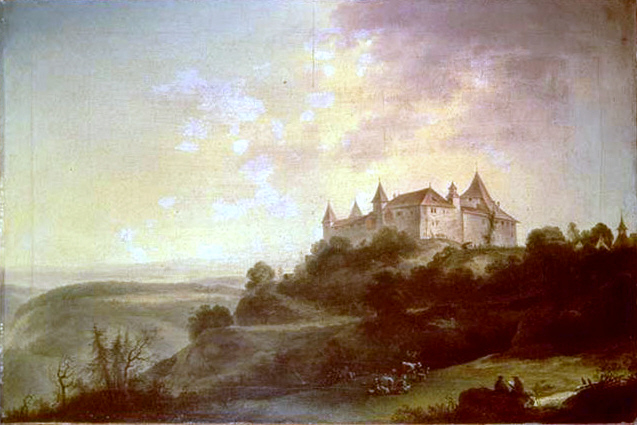
Schloss Kyburg

Hartmann I, son of Hupald IV (d. 1074) was born c. 1040 and in 1065 married Adelheid, daughter of the count of Winterthur. The male line of the counts of Winterthur had been extinct in 1053, and Hartmann I via his wife inherited the County of Kyburg with Kyburg Castle and its lands. By 1096 the counts of Dillingen included count of Kyburg as one of their titles. Hartmann I founded Neresheim Abbey in 1095, shortly before departing for the First Crusade. Many nobles found it difficult to maintain bare essentials at so great a distance from their home territories. Poverty was rife among crusaders in the Holy Land, and Hartmann sold his armor for food. He was near destitute until duke Godfrey assigned him a daily allotment from his own provisions. Hartmann I retired to Neresheim Abbey in his old age, and died there in 1121.

In 1111, the Dillingen's title is recorded as comites de Dilinga. Schloss Dillingen was expanded and fortified in the 12th century; it is mentioned as castrum Dilingin in 1220.

Hartmann's younger son Ulrich I became bishop of Constance (r. 1111–1127) while the elder brothers Hartmann II and Adalbert I expanded the territory held by the family. Hartmann II also retired to Neresheim Abbey and died in 1134, probably without a male heir. Adalbert I acquired further territory in the Thurgau by marriage, and participated in the feud between the Welfs and Staufer. Adalbert is named Count of Kyburg in documents, suggesting that he administered the family's southern possessions while his brother was still alive, but after the death of Hartmann II, Adalbert unified the family territory. He died in 1151. Adalbert is the ancestor of the two comital lines of Dillingen and Kyburg.

Adalbert's sons split the family lands: Hartmann III of Dillingen taking the Swiss property, while his brother Adalbert II received the Swabian territories. Hartmann of Kyburg acquired territory from the inheritance of the Counts of Lenzburg in 1173. He founded the cities of Diessenhofen (1178), Winterthur (1180) and possibly Frauenfeld. After the death of his brother Adalbert II in 1170 he again unified the family territories. After his death in 1080, the counties of Dillingen and Kyburg were again separated with his son Adalbert III continuing the Dillingen line and his other son Ulrich the cadet Kyburg line. Ulrich married Anna, daughter of Berthold IV, Duke of Zähringen. Both brothers accompanied Frederick Barbarossa on the Third Crusade in 1189.

Adalbert III von Dillingen sided with Philip of Swabia in the feud against Wittelsbach. He was succeeded by his son Hartmann IV, who in 1246 sided with "anti-king" Henry Raspe. In reaction, Conrad IV invaded Dillingen in 1246, 1247 and again in 1249. Hartmann's daughter Udilhild married Frederick V, Count of Zollern.

Adalbert IV, son of Hartmann IV, is mentioned as illustris nunc comes de Dilingen in 1255. He died without issue in 1257, and the allod of the manor of Dillingen passed to his younger brother, Hartmann Graf von Dillingen, Prince-Bishopric of Augsburg, which he donated to the Church of Augsburg in 1258. Upon his death in 1286, he likewise bequeathed to the Church of Augsburg his paternal inheritance, including the town and castle of Dillingen, which served as a refuge for future bishops.

== Sources ==
- Gerhard Köbler, Historisches Lexikon der deutschen Länder. Die deutschen Territorien vom Mittelalter bis zur Gegenwart, 7th ed. (2007), 141f.
- Friedrich Zoepfl (1957). "Dillingen". Neue Deutsche Biographie (in German). Vol. 3. Berlin: Duncker & Humblot. pp. 720–720. (full text online).
- Paul Kläui (1966). "Hartmann I., Graf von Dillingen-Kyburg". Neue Deutsche Biographie (in German). Vol. 7. Berlin: Duncker & Humblot. pp. 726–726. (full text online).
- Adolf Layer, Die Grafen von Dillingen. In: Jahrbuch des Historischen Vereins Dillingen an der Donau Bd. 75, Dillingen 1973
