= Battle at Chlumec (1040) =

Battle between Henry III of Holy Roman Empire against Břetislav I, Duchy of Bohemia

A supposed Battle at Chlumec between the Holy Roman Empire and the Duchy of Bohemia is sometimes mentioned as having taken place near Chlumec in 1040, concluding the unsuccessful first campaign by Henry III against Břetislav I.

This presumably refers to the encounter between the Saxon force led by Eckard II, Margrave of Meissen and the Bohemian forces of Břetislav I, which met near the Bílina River (some 20 km south-west of Chlumec) n early September 1040, but according to Perlbach (1870:451f.), the commanders reached an agreement allowing the Saxons to withdraw without battle.

The Saxon forces led by Eckard II, Margrave of Meissen and Bardo, bishop of Mainz, assembled at Dohna, on the left bank of the Elbe, on 15 August. They were supposed to unite with Henry's forces before marching against Prague, but they remained in Dohna for ten days. During this time, Henry was ambushed in the Upper Palatine Forest and suffered heavy losses. Eckard did not enter Bohemia immediately because he was opposed by Bohemian forces led by the count of Bílina. Instead, he negotiated a bribe, and on 24 August, the count of Bílina allowed the Saxons to move south into Bohemia across the passes of the Central Bohemian Uplands, putting up only token resistance.

Eckard passed Chlumec, and pillaged the Bohemian countryside for nine days, suffering only minor losses in a skirmish on 31 August. At Gnevin, Eckard was reached by messengers sent by Henry, led by Gunther of Bohemia, informing him of his defeat at Brůdek and ordering him to retreat. Meanwhile, Břetislav had moved up against the Saxon force. Gunther appears to have negotiated an agreement between Eckard and Břetislav allowing the Saxons to retreat without engagement, but Břetislav captured the treacherous count of Bílina, having him blinded and mutilated and thrown into a gully (Perlbach 1870:452, citing Cosmas of Prague).

Henry started a second, successful campaign the following year, in August 1041, this time uniting with the forces of Eckard II near Prague, which forced Břetislav's surrender.
