= Nürensdorf =

- Municipality
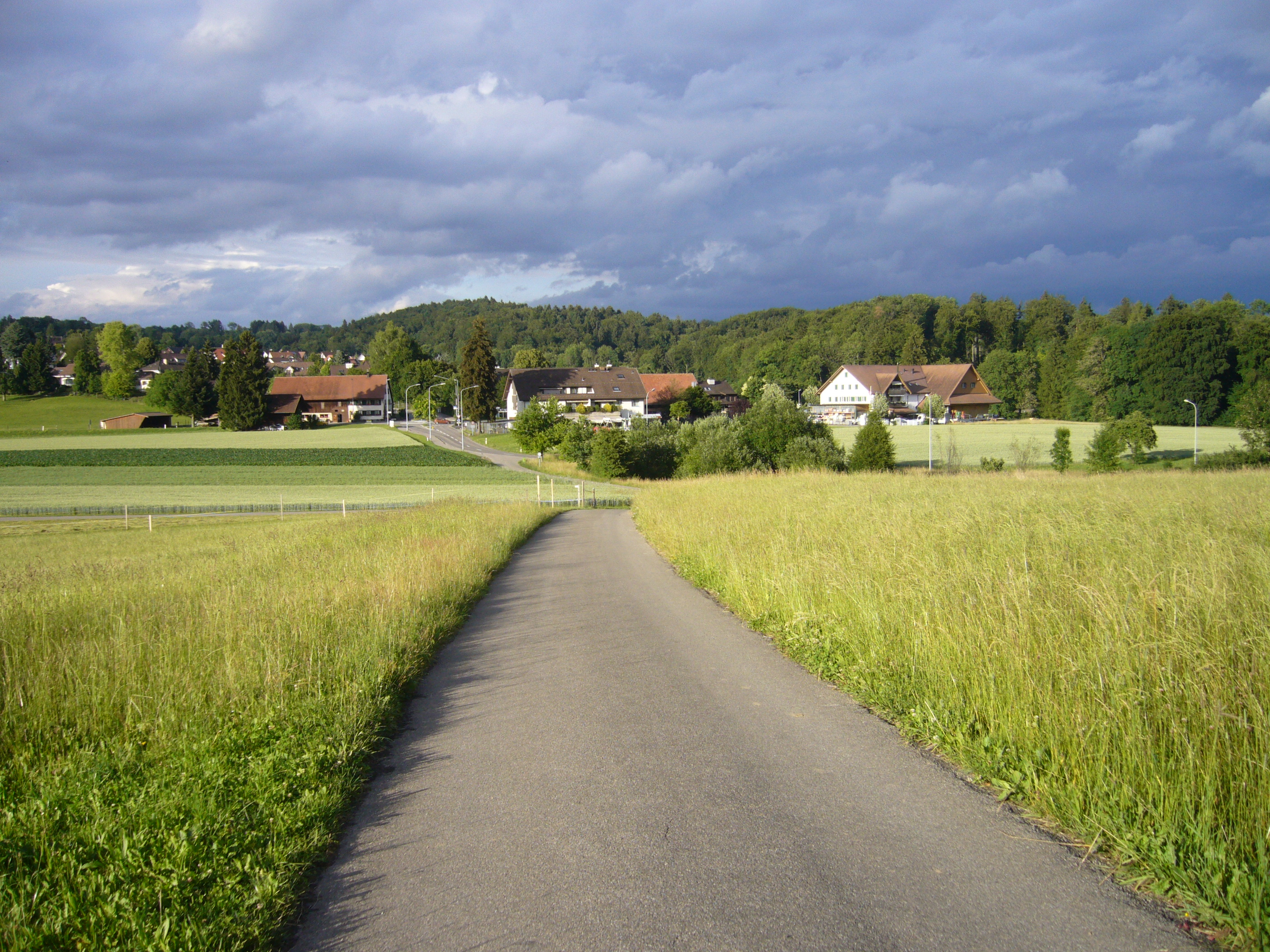

- Flag Coat of arms
- Location of Nürensdorf
- Location within Switzerland Location within Canton of Zurich
- Coordinates: 47°26′N 8°38′E
- Country: Switzerland
- Canton: Zurich
- District: Bülach

Area
  - Total: 10.09 km^{2} (3.90 sq mi)
- Elevation: 502 m (1,647 ft)

Population (December 2020)
  - Total: 5,628
  - Density: 557.8/km^{2} (1,445/sq mi)
- Time zone: UTC+01:00 (CET)
  - Summer (DST): UTC+02:00 (CEST)
- Postal code: 8309
- SFOS number: 64
- ISO 3166 code: CH-ZH
- Surrounded by: Bassersdorf, Brütten, Kloten, Lindau, Oberembrach
- Website: www.nuerensdorf.ch

Nürensdorf (Swiss Standard German pronunciation: [ˈnyːrənsdɔrf]) is a municipality in the district of Bülach in the canton of Zürich in Switzerland.

== History ==
Nürensdorf is first mentioned around 1150 as Noelistorf. In 1277 it was mentioned as Nueristorf.

Aerial view (1964)

== Geography ==
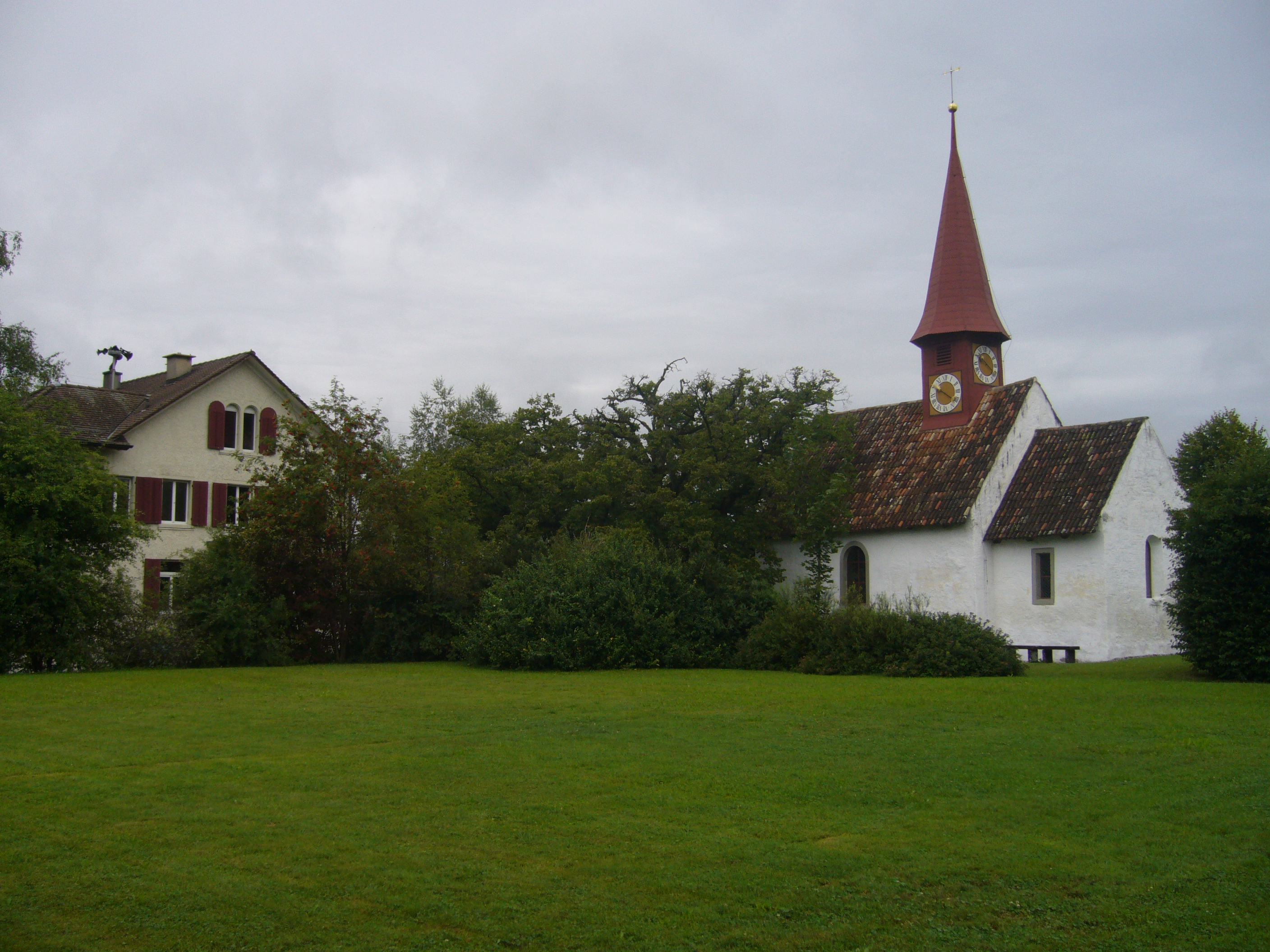
Nürensdorf school and Chappel of St. Oswald

Nürensdorf has an area of 10.1 km^{2} (3.9 sq mi). Of this area, 48.6% is used for agricultural purposes, while 32.1% is forested. The rest of the land, (19.2%) is settled.

The municipality is located on the south west edge of the Brütten plateau. The main village is Nürensdorf, a Haufendorf (an irregular, unplanned and quite closely packed village, built around a central square) which was a Straßendorf (Linear village) until about 1700. The municipality also includes the town sections of Birchwil (first mentioned around 1155 as Byrchenwilare), Breite and Oberwil, the hamlets of Hakab, Breitenloo, Chlihus and until 1931 Baltenswil (now part of Bassersdorf). Additionally, since 1869, the village of Breitehof has been part of the municipality.

== Demographics ==
Nürensdorf has a population (as of 31 December 2020) of 5,628. As of 2007, 11.3% of the population was made up of foreign nationals. Over the last 10 years the population has grown at a rate of 12.9%. Most of the population (as of 2000) speaks German (90.6%), with Italian being second most common (2.2%) and French being third (1.2%).

In the 2007 election the most popular party was the SVP which received 45.6% of the vote. The next three most popular parties were the FDP (15.3%), the SPS (11.8%) and the CSP (9.5%).

The age distribution of the population (as of 2000) is children and teenagers (0–19 years old) make up 22.5% of the population, while adults (20–64 years old) make up 66.2% and seniors (over 64 years old) make up 11.3%. In Nürensdorf about 83.9% of the population (between age 25-64) have completed either non-mandatory upper secondary education or additional higher education (either university or a Fachhochschule).

Nürensdorf has an unemployment rate of 1.75%. As of 2005, there were 68 people employed in the primary economic sector and about 29 businesses involved in this sector. 327 people are employed in the secondary sector and there are 42 businesses in this sector. 452 people are employed in the tertiary sector, with 111 businesses in this sector.

Historical population
Year	Pop.	±%
1467	145	—
1634	409	+182.1%
1799	832	+103.4%
1850	1,114	+33.9%
1900	1,068	−4.1%
1950^{a}	777	−27.2%
1960	906	+16.6%
1970	2,012	+122.1%
2000	4,475	+122.4%
2022	5,698	+27.3%
^a Baltenswil had a population in 1930 of 245. It became part of Bassersdorf in 1931. Source:
