= Guntherstein =

Coordinates: 48.864689°N 13.146396°E

The Guntherstein (c.700 m above sea level (NHN)) is a crag in the Bavarian Forest with good views, high above the bowl of the Lallinger Winkel and village of Lalling in Bavaria, Germany.

The name comes from Saint Gunther, who once moved from Niederalteich Abbey to the then empty and primeval Bavarian Forest, cleared parts of the forests for settlement and later settled himself in the Bohemian Forest. The Gunthersteig, a hiking trail that leads in several days from Niederalteich via the Guntherstein and the border crossing at Gsenget to St. Gunther's Church in Czech Dobrá Voda near Hartmanice, still commemorates him today.

From this prominent rock there is a view over the Lallinger Winkel south to the Danube plain. On clear föhn days the view reaches as far as the Alps.
