= Prášily =

- Municipality
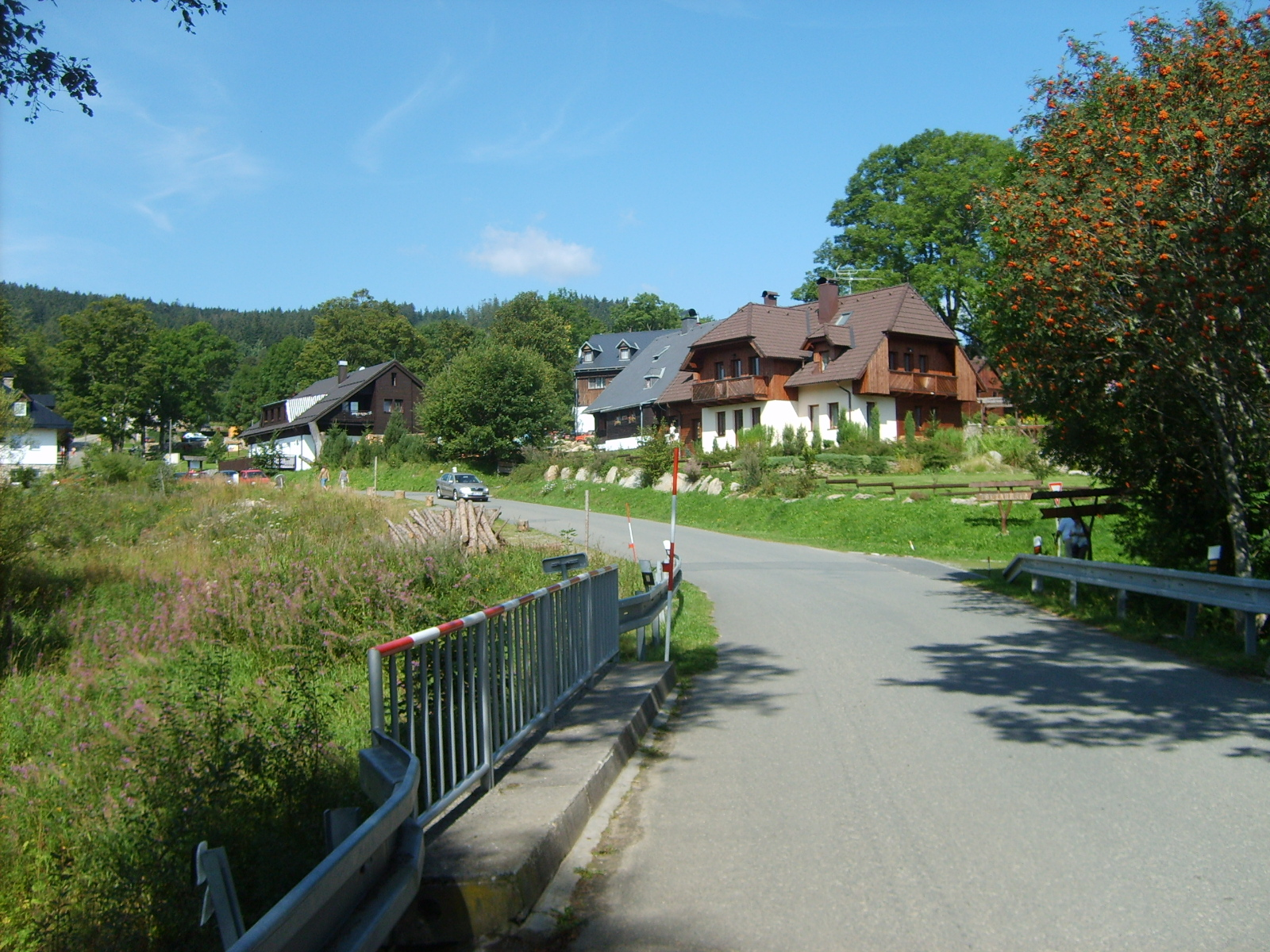
- Entrance to Prášily from the direction of Srní

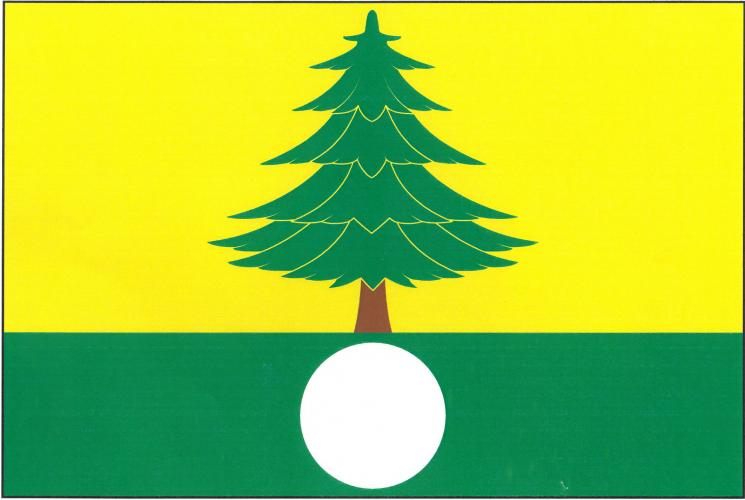
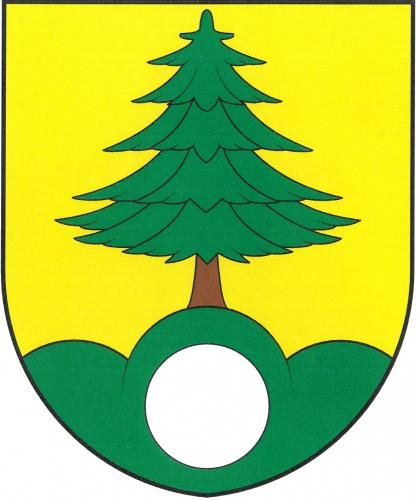
- Flag Coat of arms

- Location in the Czech Republic
- Coordinates: 49°6′19″N 13°22′41″E
- Country: Czech Republic
- Region: Plzeň
- District: Klatovy
- First mentioned: 1732

Area
  - Total: 112.33 km^{2} (43.37 sq mi)
- Elevation: 880 m (2,890 ft)

Population (2026-01-01)
  - Total: 153
  - Density: 1.36/km^{2} (3.53/sq mi)
- Time zone: UTC+1 (CET)
  - Summer (DST): UTC+2 (CEST)
- Postal code: 342 01
- Website: www.sumavanet.cz/prasily/

Prášily (German: Stubenbach) is a municipality and village in Klatovy District in the Plzeň Region of the Czech Republic. It has about 200 inhabitants.

== Administrative division ==
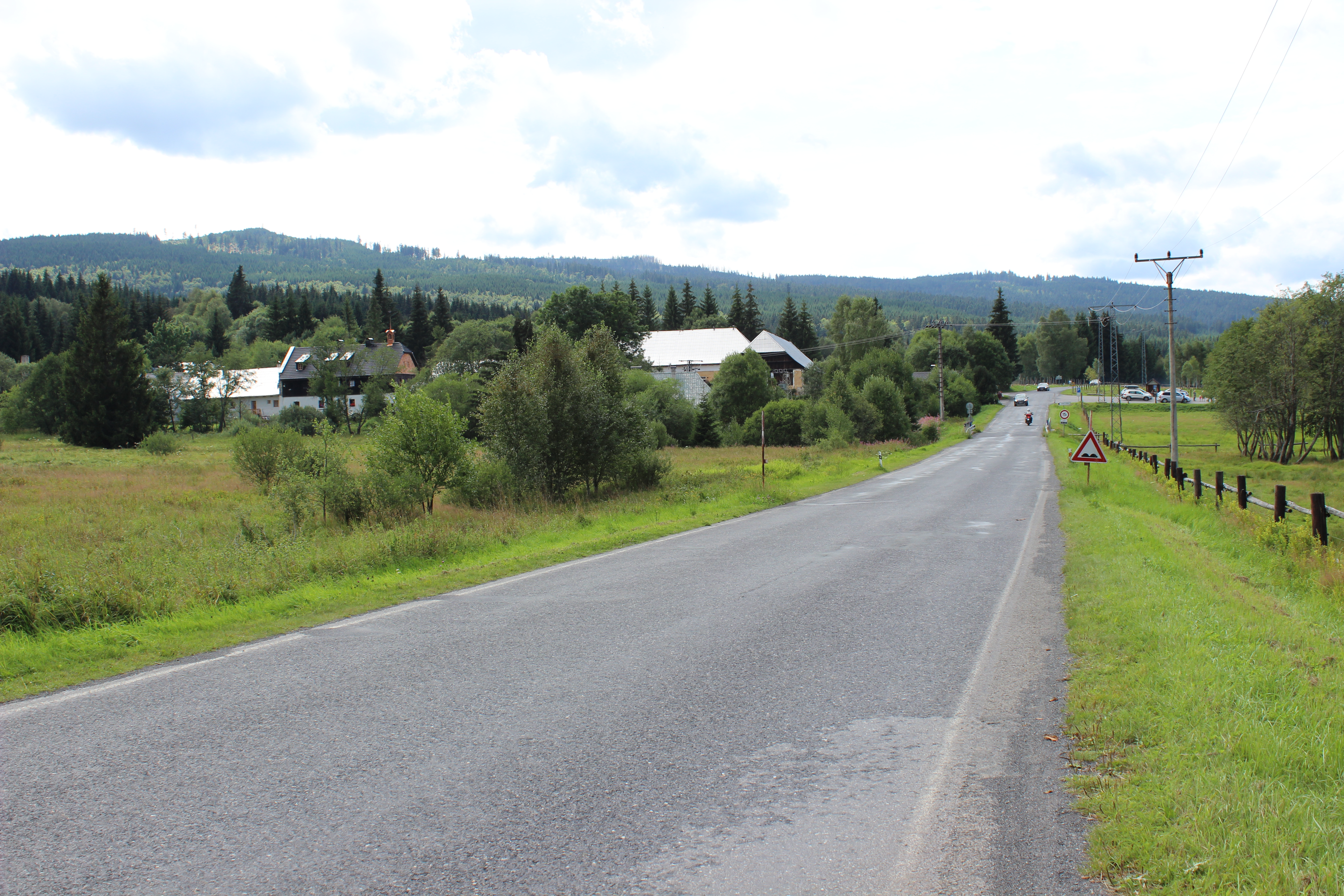
Nová Hůrka village

Prášily consists of two municipal parts (in brackets population according to the 2021 census):

- Prášily (104)
- Nová Hůrka (30)

== Etymology ==
The initial German name Stubenbach was transferred to the settlement from the local stream. The stream (German: Bach) flows through a deep gorge here, which was called die finstere Stube ('the dark room'). The Czech name originated as an inaccurate translation of the German name, from the German verb stauben (Czech: prášit, i.e. 'to dust').

== Geography ==
Prášily is located about 32 kilometres (20 mi) south of Klatovy and 70 km (43 mi) south of Plzeň. It borders Germany in the southwest. It lies in the Bohemian Forest and within the Šumava National Park. The highest point is the Plesná mountain at 1,338 m (4,390 ft) above sea level. The Křemelná River flows through the municipality. A small but notable body of water is Lake Laka, one of few natural lakes in the Czech Republic.

With an area of 112.33 km^{2}, Prášily is the largest municipality in the country without the town status by size, even though most of Prášily's territory is covered by forests.

== History ==
The first written mention of Prášily is from 1732. In 1749, Lorenz Gattermayer bought the area from Countess Mansfeld and founded here two glassworks. After the Seven Years' War, Gattermayer had to sell Prášily due to debts. The new owners were the Kinsky family, who leased the glassworks to the Abele family. During their era, tens of thousands of mirrors were produced in Prášily and the village experienced the greatest development. The school was opened in 1787 and the construction of the church began in 1793.

In the early 1820s, glass factories disappeared due to competition. Lumberjacks moved into the abandoned houses. A paper mill was established in the buildings of the glass grinding mills in 1918, but it was destroyed by fire in 1933. Before World War I, the area was acquired by the Schwarzenberg family, who owned it until 1930.

After World War II, the German-speaking population was expelled.

== Demographics ==
Historical population

Year	Pop.	±%
1869	3,397	—
1880	4,460	+31.3%
1890	5,166	+15.8%
1900	4,894	−5.3%
1910	3,418	−30.2%

Year	Pop.	±%
1921	3,365	−1.6%
1930	2,835	−15.8%
1950	328	−88.4%
1961	319	−2.7%
1970	291	−8.8%

Year	Pop.	±%
1980	188	−35.4%
1991	148	−21.3%
2001	131	−11.5%
2011	150	+14.5%
2021	134	−10.7%

Source: Censuses

== Transport ==
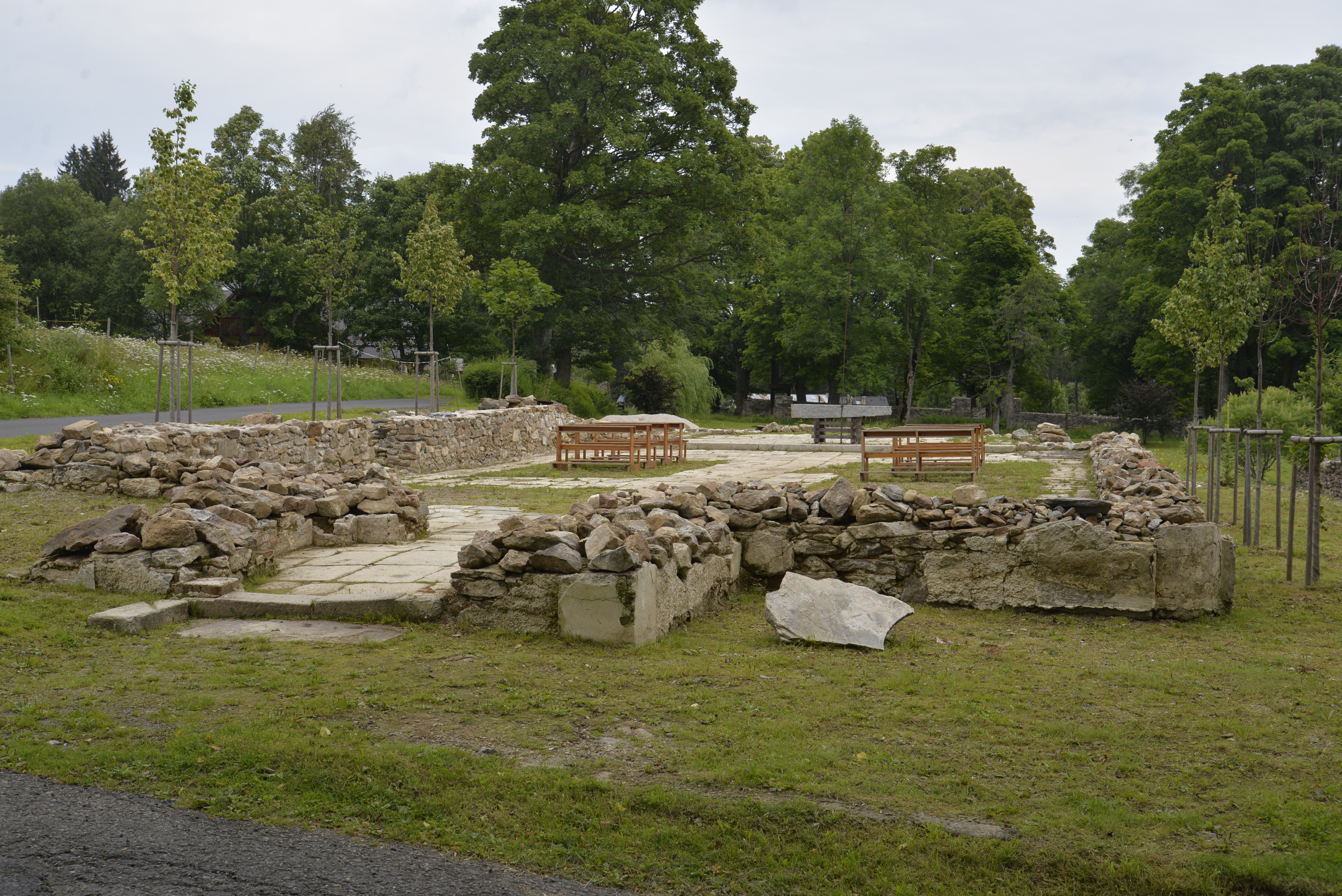
Remnants of the Church of Saint Procopius

There are no railways or major roads passing through the municipality.

== Sights ==
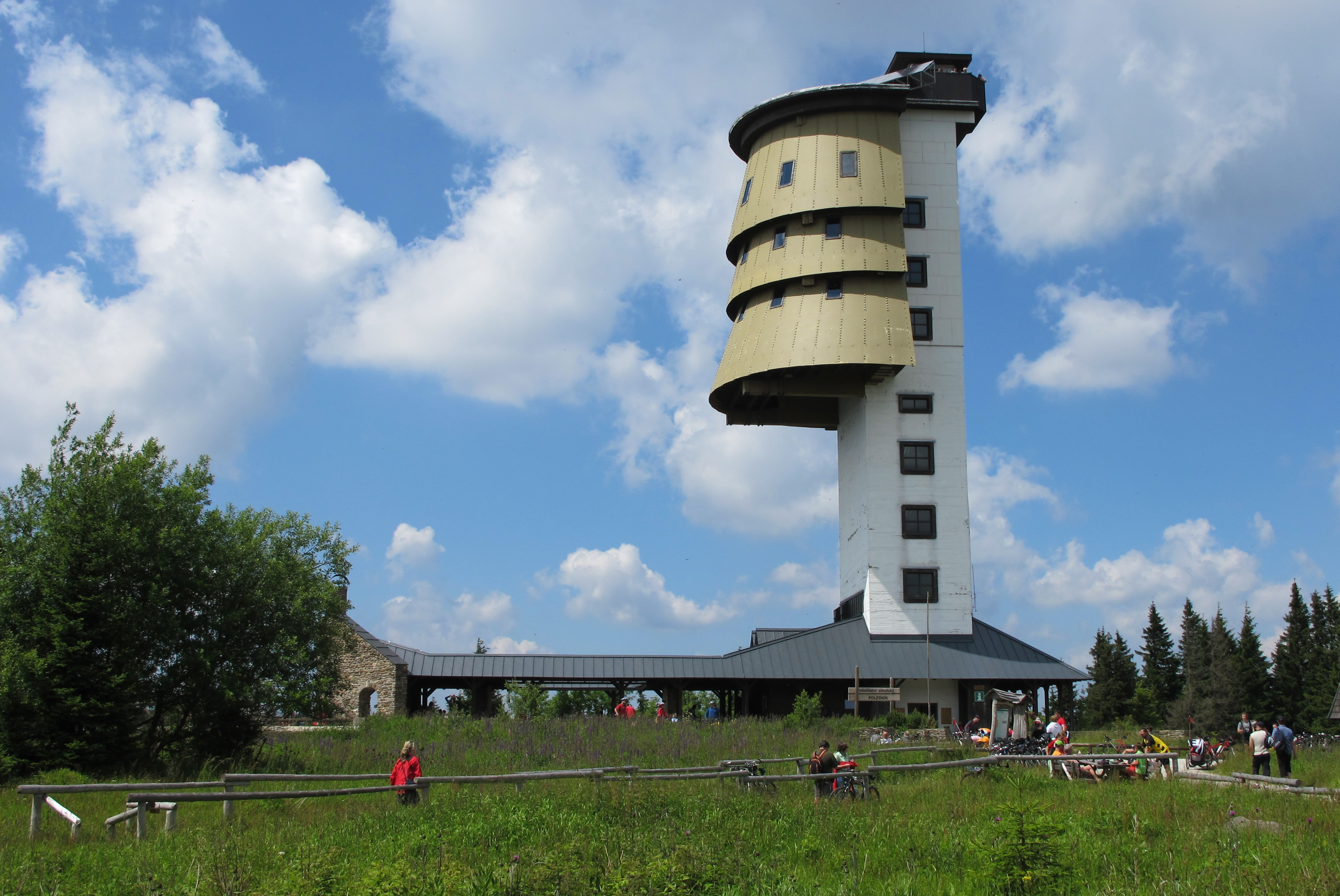
Poledník observation tower

The main landmark of Prášily was the Church of Saint Procopius. It was built in the Neoclassical style in 1802–1803 and was demolished in 1978. Although it was demolished, its remains are protected as a cultural monument.

In Prášily is a freely accessible botanical garden with more than 5,000 species of plants. It covers an area of 1.5 ha (3.7 acres) and is the highest botanical garden in the country.

On Poledník Hill (1,315 m (4,314 ft) above sea level) is the eponymous observation tower. It was created by the reconstruction of a military building and was opened in 1998. It is 37 m (121 ft) high and, due to the climatic conditions, is only accessible in the summer season.

== Notable people ==
- Gunther of Bohemia (c. 955 – 1045), Catholic hermit and diplomat; died in the hermitage on Březník mountain
