= Flags of the Holy Roman Empire =

Imperial banners used by Holy Roman Emperor

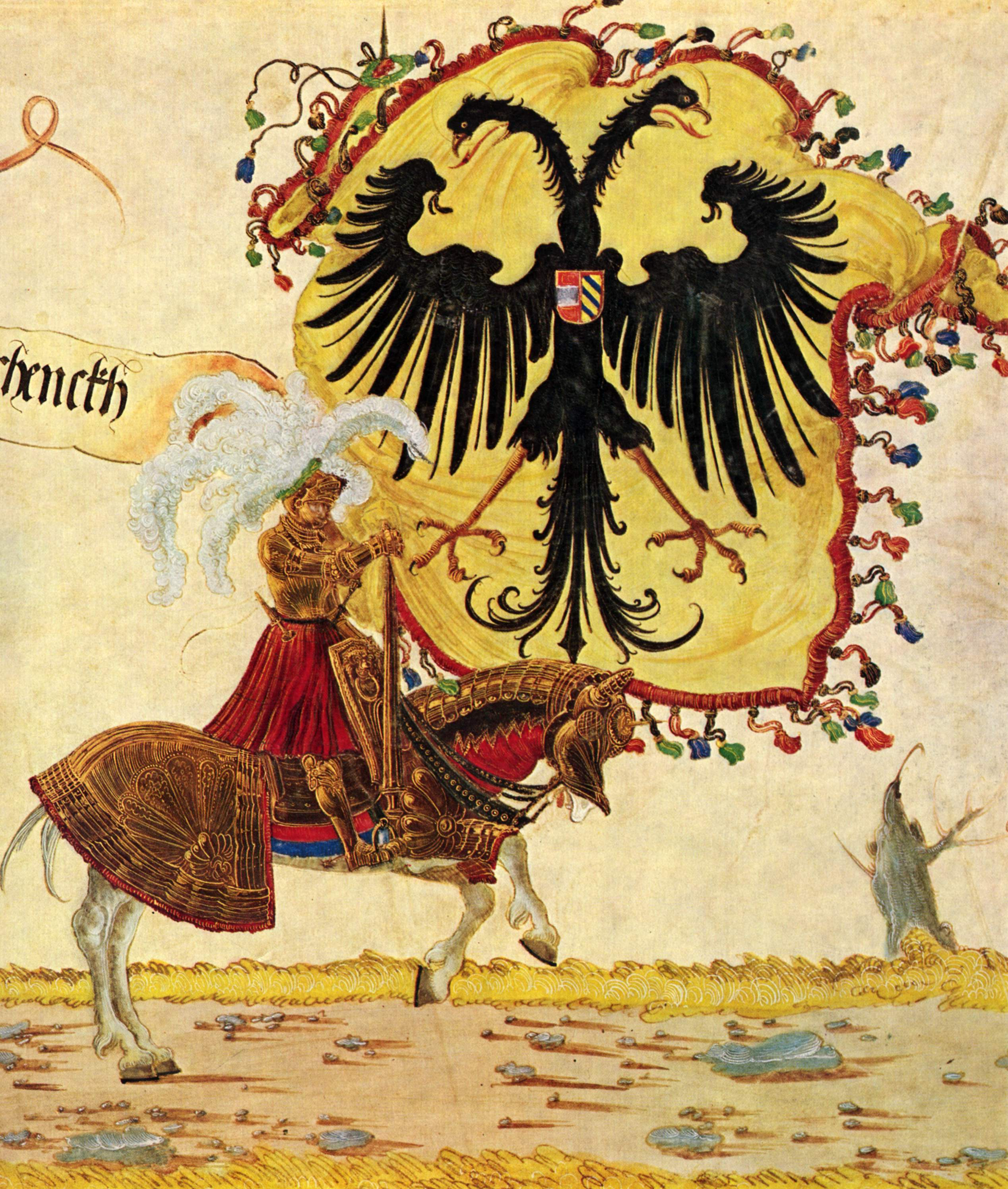
Emperor Maximilian with the Imperial Banner, bordered in crimson and parti-colored fringe. (Albrecht Altdorfer, c. 1515)

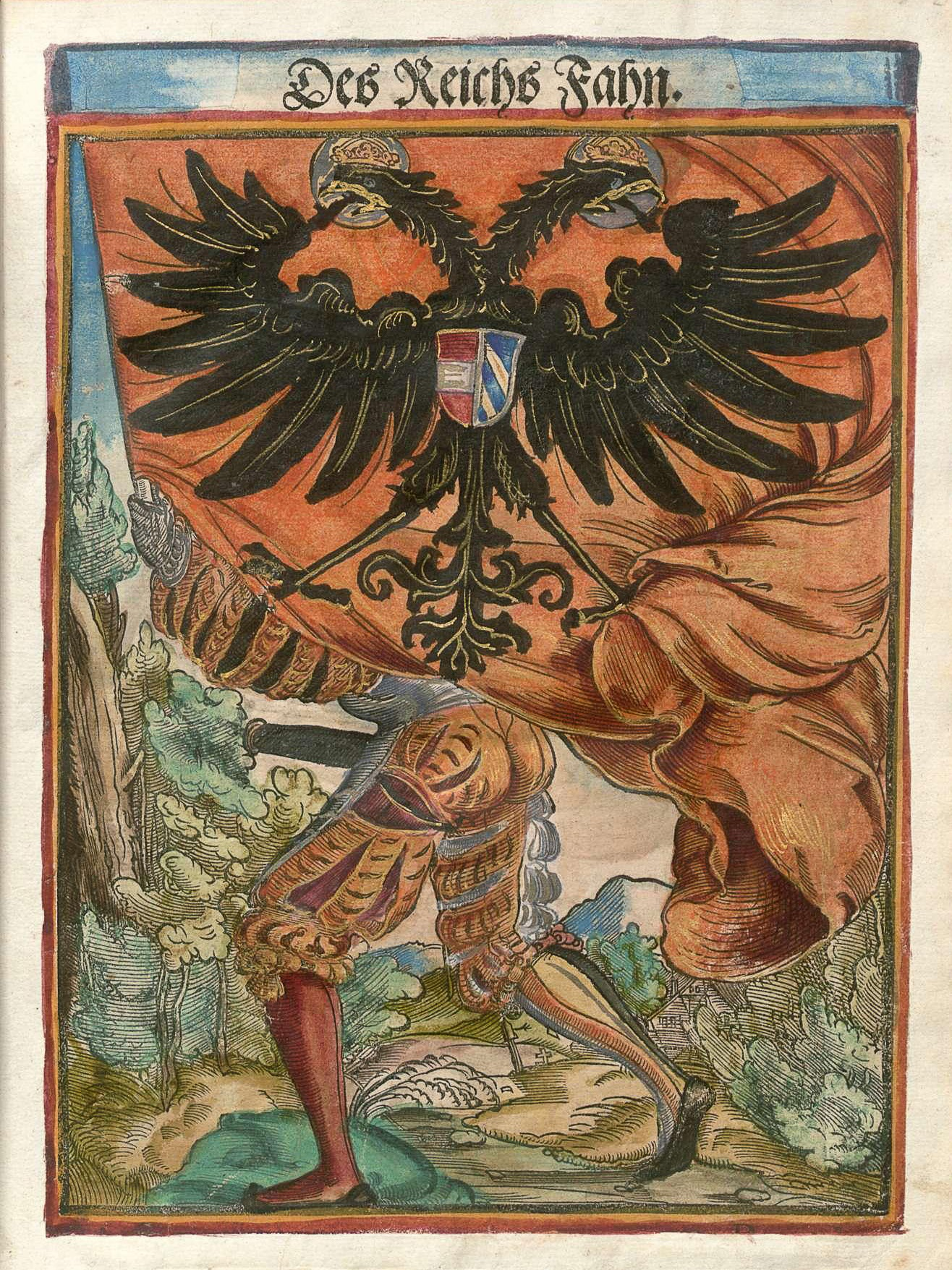
"The Flag of the Empire" (Des Reichs Fahn), 1545

The flag of the Holy Roman Empire was not a national flag, but rather an imperial banner used by the Holy Roman Emperor; black and gold were used as the colours of the imperial banner, a black eagle on a golden background. After the late 13th or early 14th century, the claws and beak of the eagle were coloured red. From the early 15th century, a double-headed eagle was used.

In 1804, Napoleon Bonaparte declared the First French Empire. In response to this, Emperor Francis II of the Habsburg dynasty declared his personal domain to be the Austrian Empire and became Francis I of Austria. Taking the colours of the banner of the Holy Roman Emperor, the flag of the Austrian Empire was black and gold. Francis II was the last Holy Roman Emperor, with Napoleon forcing the empire's dissolution in 1806. After this point, these colours continued to be used as the Flag of the Habsburg monarchy until 1918.

The colours red and white were also significant during this period. When the Holy Roman Empire took part in the Crusades, a war flag was flown alongside the black-gold imperial banner. This flag, known as the "Saint George Flag", was a white cross on a red background: the reverse of the St George's Cross used as the flag of Lombardy and England. Red and white were also colours of the Hanseatic League (13th–17th centuries). Hanseatic trading ships were identifiable by their red-white pennants and most Hanseatic cities adopted red and white as their city colours (see Hanseatic flags). Red and white still feature as the colours of many former Hanseatic cities such as Hamburg or Bremen.

In northern Italy, during the conflict between the Guelphs and Ghibellines in the 12th to 14th centuries, the armies of the Ghibelline (pro-imperial) communes adopted the war banner of the Holy Roman Emperor (white cross on red) as their own, while the Guelph (anti-imperial) communes reversed the colours (red cross on white). These two schemes are prevalent in the modern civic heraldry of northern Italian towns and remains a revealing indicator of their past factional leanings. Traditionally Ghibelline towns like Pavia, Novara, Como, and Asti continue to display the Ghibelline cross. The Guelph cross can be found on the civic arms of traditionally Guelph towns like Milan, Vercelli, Alessandria, Reggio, and Bologna.

== Imperial banners ==
According to Meyers Konversations-Lexikon of 1897 (under the heading "Banner"), the German Imperial Banner at the time of Henry the Fowler (r. 919–936) and Otto the Great (r. 936–973) depicted the Archangel Michael; at the time of Frederick Barbarossa (r. 1152–90), an eagle; at the time of Otto IV (r. 1198–1215) an eagle hovering over a dragon, and since the time of Sigismund (r. 1410–37), and "perhaps earlier", the Imperial Eagle, namely a black eagle in a yellow field, bearing the arms of the emperor's house on its breast.

Reconstructions	Date	Use	Description
	14th century	The earliest Imperial Banner of the Holy Roman Emperor and royal banner of the King of the Romans	Or, an eagle sable displayed
	early 1400s	Imperial Banner of the Holy Roman Emperor	Or, an Imperial Eagle displayed with a halo sable armed and langued gules
	c. 1430–1806	Imperial Banner of the Holy Roman Emperor	Or, a double-headed Imperial Eagle displayed with a halo sable armed and langued gules
	1437–1493	Imperial Banner of Frederick III	The Imperial banner with an escutcheon of the coat of arms of Frederick III (gules, a fess argent)
	1493–1556	Imperial Banner of Maximilian I and Charles V	The Imperial banner with an escutcheon of the coat of arms of Maximilian I (gules a fess argent, impaling bendy of six Or and azure a bordure gules)
	1519–1556	Imperial Banner of Charles V	The Imperial banner with an escutcheon of the coat of arms of Charles V

== War flag ==
The Reichsfahne (Imperial flag) was a field ensign of the Holy Roman Empire, originally an equestrian flag or gonfalon. An early bearer was Werner I, count of Winterthur, who carried the flag for Conrad II and Henry III and who died in the battle at Brůdek in 1040. In the 12th century, the Reichsfahne apparently showed a white cross on a red field. It was the sign of the united armed forces of the Empire until the late 15th century, but it could be sent by the king to local lords to sanction them in their defense of Landfrieden. Thus, king Sigismund gave the banner to the Swiss Confederacy, sanctioning their war against the Habsburgs in 1415.

In the late medieval period, the cross design of the Reichsfahne was replaced by the Imperial eagle. It was treated as an Imperial fief traditionally granted to Swabian nobles. In 1336, it was granted to Ulrich III, Count of Württemberg. On this occasion, it was first referred to as the Reichssturmfahne ("Imperial War Flag"). It remained part of the heraldic insignia of the House of Württemberg until the 19th century. The flag itself was kept in Stuttgart until 1944, when it was destroyed in a bombing raid. The flag showed the imperial eagle in a square field, with a red Schwenkel (pennon) on top. It is not to be confused with the Reichsrennfahne, granted to the Electors of Saxony in their function as Reichserzmarschall. This latter flag showed two crossed swords in a black and white field.

Flag	Date	Use	Description
	12th–early 14th centuries	Reichssturmfahne (War flag, used alongside the Imperial Banner)	It was developed from the Knights Templar's flag in the 12th century during the Papacy-sponsored crusades, and was in use as Imperial War Flag during the 13th and early 14th centuries. It was smaller than the imperial banner, carried before the emperor or his appointed commander in battle.
	15th century	Reichssturmfahne	
	15th century	Reichsrennfahne	

== Free Imperial Cities ==
Some free imperial cities took to displaying symbols of the empire, especially the Imperial eagle, as part of their flags or coats of arms.

Flag	Date	Use	Description
		Flag of the Free Imperial City of Memmingen	Per pale argent, dimidiated an Imperial Eagle displayed sable, impaling a cross pattée gules
		Coat of arms of the Free Imperial City of Nuremberg	Per pale Or, a double-headed Imperial Eagle displayed with langued gules, dimidiated with bendy of gules and argent
	15th century	Flag of Geneva	Geneva had the dual status of free city and Prince-Bishopric from the 12th century; this is reflected in the flag of Geneva, which since the 15th century has shown both the Imperial Eagle and a key of St. Peter, divided per pale.
