= Counts of Winterthur =

Coat of arms of Counts of Winterthur

The Counts of Winterthur were a Swabian noble family, a branch of the Udalrichinger dynasty, who ruled parts of Thurgau in the 10th and 11th centuries. They are named for the Alemannic settlement at Vitudurum, but their rule predates the foundation of the city of Winterthur in 1180.

== History ==
The first count of Winterthur was Liutfried II (fl.970s), third son of Udalrich VI of Bregenz (d. 955). This Liutfried likely built the first Kyburg castle in the later 10th century. He was succeeded by his son Adalbert I (d. 8 September 1030).

Liutfried's younger son Werner of Kyburg (d. 17 August 1030, not to be confused with his grandson Werner I of Winterthur) was a friend of Ernest II, Duke of Swabia, who after his failed against emperor Conrad II sought refuge in Kyburg castle. Conrad besieged and destroyed the castle and both Ernest and Werner managed to flee to Falkenstein castle in Schramberg, where they were killed by troops of Warmann, bishop of Constance.

Adalbert's son Werner I (c. 990–1040) (de) was appointed landgrave in Hessengau (Maden) by Conrad II in 1027 before succeeding his father as count in 1030. Werner was bearer of the Reichsfahne (imperial flag) under Conrad II and Henry III and he died in the battle at Brůdek against Bretislav I.

The last count of Winterthur was Adalbert II (c. 1025–1053), the second son of Werner I. Adalbert died without a male heir, and the title passed to Hartmann I, count of Dillingen, who married Adalbert's daughter Adelheid in 1065.
