= Lufingen =

- Municipality
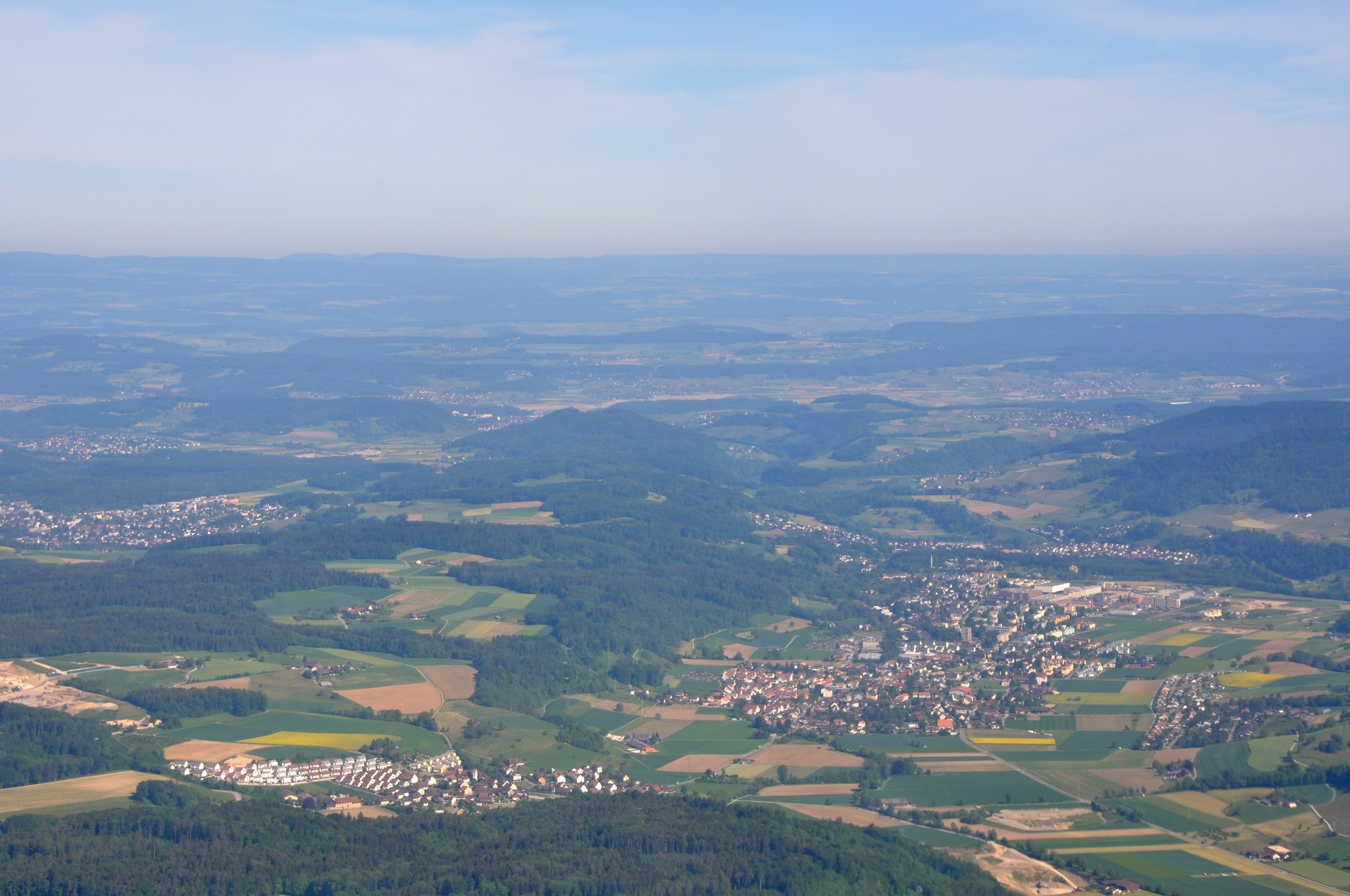

- Flag Coat of arms
- Location of Lufingen
- Location within Switzerland Location within Canton of Zurich
- Coordinates: 47°30′N 8°36′E
- Country: Switzerland
- Canton: Zurich
- District: Bülach

Area
  - Total: 5.22 km^{2} (2.02 sq mi)
- Elevation: 459 m (1,506 ft)

Population (December 2020)
  - Total: 2,562
  - Density: 491/km^{2} (1,270/sq mi)
- Time zone: UTC+01:00 (CET)
  - Summer (DST): UTC+02:00 (CEST)
- Postal code: 8426
- SFOS number: 63
- ISO 3166 code: CH-ZH
- Surrounded by: Embrach, Kloten, Oberembrach, Winkel
- Website: www.lufingen.ch

Lufingen (German pronunciation: [ˈluːfɪŋən]) is a municipality in the district of Bülach in the canton of Zürich in Switzerland.

== History ==
Aerial view (1959)

Lufingen is first mentioned in 1157 as Luvingin.

== Geography ==
Lufingen has an area of 5.2 km^{2} (2.0 sq mi). Of this area, 50.7% is used for agricultural purposes, while 37.8% is forested. Of the rest of the land, 11.4% is settled (buildings or roads) and the remainder (0.2%) is non-productive (rivers, glaciers or mountains). The municipality is located in the upper Embrachertal. It includes the village of Lufingen and since 1871 the village of Augwil.

== Demographics ==
Lufingen has a population (as of 31 December 2020) of 2,562. As of 2007, 14.2% of the population was made up of foreign nationals. Over the last 10 years the population has grown at a rate of 47.6%. Most of the population (as of 2000) speaks German (88.9%), with Albanian being second most common ( 2.1%) and Italian being third ( 1.8%).

In the 2007 election the most popular party was the SVP which received 48.5% of the vote. The next three most popular parties were the FDP (12.1%), the SPS (10.6%) and the CSP (8.9%).

The age distribution of the population (as of 2000) is children and teenagers (0–19 years old) make up 20.4% of the population, while adults (20–64 years old) make up 69.3% and seniors (over 64 years old) make up 10.3%. In Lufingen about 83.8% of the population (between age 25–64) have completed either non-mandatory upper secondary education or additional higher education (either university or a Fachhochschule).

Lufingen has an unemployment rate of 2.17%. As of 2005, there were 32 people employed in the primary economic sector and about 14 businesses involved in this sector. 62 people are employed in the secondary sector and there are 12 businesses in this sector. 128 people are employed in the tertiary sector, with 32 businesses in this sector. The historical population is given in the following table:

| year | population |
|---|---|
| 1467 | c. 15^{a} |
| 1634 | 148^{a} |
| 1850 | 259^{a} |
| 1900 | 332^{b} |
| 1950 | 343 |
| 2000 | 1,172 |

^a Not including Augwil
^b After 1871 population numbers include Augwil
