= Oberembrach =

- Municipality
- Flag Coat of arms
- Location of Oberembrach
- Location within Switzerland Location within Canton of Zürich
- Coordinates: 47°29.262′N 8°37.107′E
- Country: Switzerland
- Canton: Zürich
- District: Bülach

Area
  - Total: 10.20 km^{2} (3.94 sq mi)
- Elevation: 459 m (1,506 ft)

Population (December 2020)
  - Total: 1,105
  - Density: 108.3/km^{2} (280.6/sq mi)
- Time zone: UTC+01:00 (CET)
  - Summer (DST): UTC+02:00 (CEST)
- Postal code: 8425
- SFOS number: 65
- ISO 3166 code: CH-ZH
- Surrounded by: Brütten, Embrach, Kloten, Lufingen, Nürensdorf, Pfungen, Winterthur
- Website: www.oberembrach.ch

Oberembrach is a municipality in the district of Bülach in the canton of Zürich in Switzerland.

== History ==
Oberembrach is first mentioned in 1274 as Obern-Emmerach. However, the village was not an independent municipality until 1809. Before that date it was part of the municipality of Embrach.

Aerial view (1948)

== Geography ==
Oberembrach has an area of 10.2 km^{2} (3.9 sq mi). Of this area, 58.3% is used for agricultural purposes, while 34.1% is forested. Of the rest of the land, 7.3% is settled (buildings or roads) and the remainder (0.2%) is non-productive (rivers, glaciers or mountains).

The municipality is located in the upper Wildbachtal. It includes the Haufendorf (an irregular, unplanned and quite closely packed village, built around a central square) of Oberembrach. In addition to the village, it includes the hamlets of Hausen, Madlikon, Mühlberg, Ober-, Untermettmenstetten, Ober-, Unterwagenburg, Rotenfluh, Sonnenbühl, Stigen and Stürzikon. In 1871 the hamlets of Augwil and Vordermarchlen were removed from Oberrembrach and transferred to Lufingen. In 1927 the hamlets of Eigental, Hinter- and Vorderbänikon were transferred to Kloten.

== Demographics ==
Oberembrach has a population (as of 31 December 2020) of 1,105. As of 2007, 6.8% of the population was made up of foreign nationals. Over the last 10 years the population has decreased at a rate of -0.9%. Most of the population (as of 2000) speaks German (95.1%), with French being second most common ( 1.0%) and Portuguese being third ( 0.8%).

In the 2007 election the most popular party was the SVP which received 51.7% of the vote. The next three most popular parties were the FDP (10.6%), the SPS (9.1%) and the CSP (9%).

The age distribution of the population (as of 2000) is children and teenagers (0–19 years old) make up 24.5% of the population, while adults (20–64 years old) make up 63.9% and seniors (over 64 years old) make up 11.5%. In Oberembrach about 88.8% of the population (between age 25-64) have completed either non-mandatory upper secondary education or additional higher education (either university or a Fachhochschule).

Oberembrach has an unemployment rate of 1.55%. As of 2005, there were 81 people employed in the primary economic sector and about 35 businesses involved in this sector. 40 people are employed in the secondary sector and there are 13 businesses in this sector. 56 people are employed in the tertiary sector, with 19 businesses in this sector. The historical population is given in the following table:

year	population
1850	843
1900	617
1950	571
1990	1,001
2000	990
