= Brütten =

- Municipality
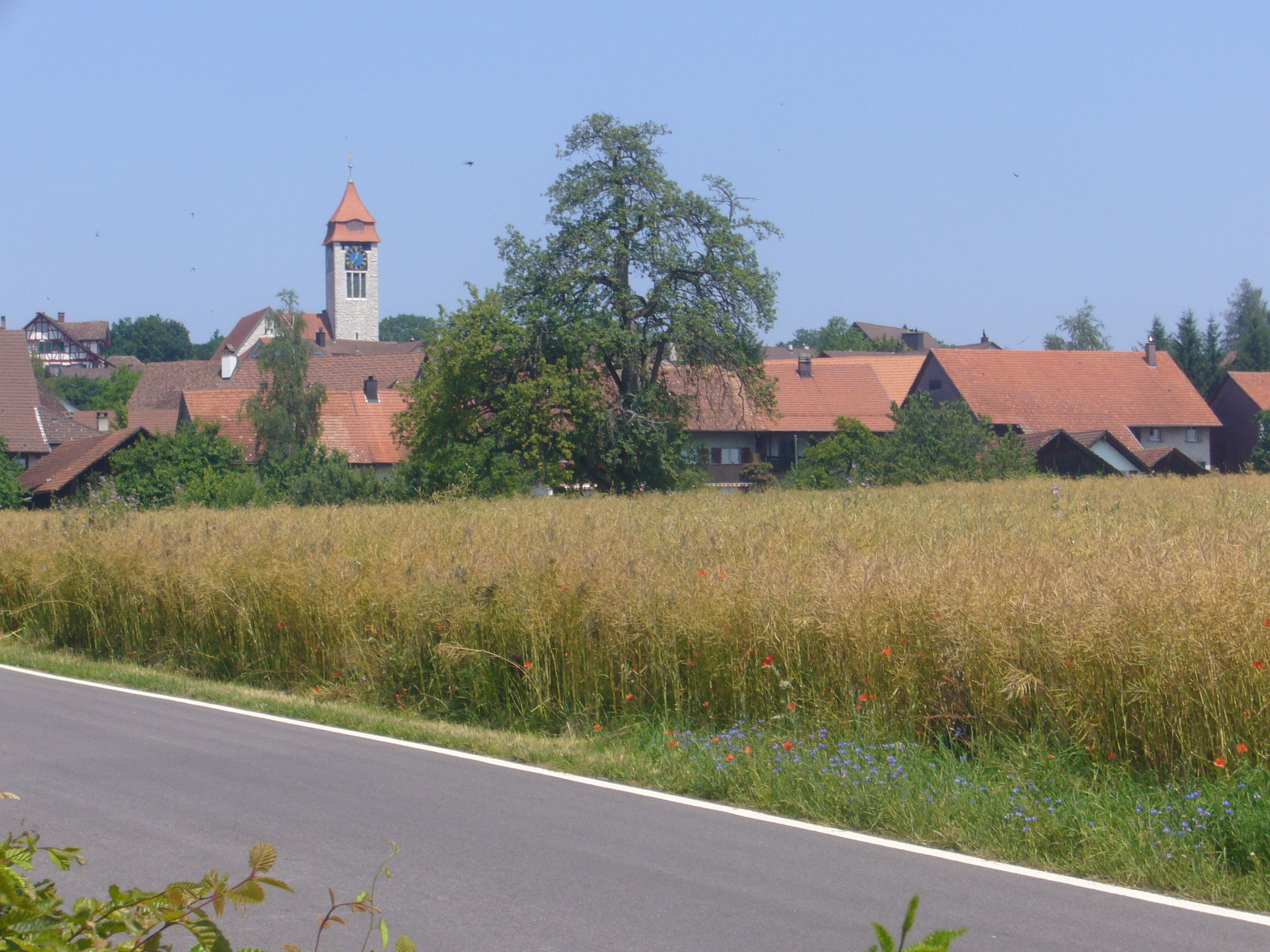

- Flag Coat of arms
- Location of Brütten
- Location within Switzerland Location within Canton of Zurich
- Coordinates: 47°28′N 8°40′E
- Country: Switzerland
- Canton: Zurich
- District: Winterthur

Area
  - Total: 6.67 km^{2} (2.58 sq mi)
- Elevation: 610 m (2,000 ft)

Population (December 2020)
  - Total: 2,063
  - Density: 309/km^{2} (801/sq mi)
- Time zone: UTC+01:00 (CET)
  - Summer (DST): UTC+02:00 (CEST)
- Postal code: 8311
- SFOS number: 213
- ISO 3166 code: CH-ZH
- Localities: Straubikon
- Surrounded by: Lindau, Nürensdorf, Oberembrach, Winterthur
- Website: www.bruetten.ch

Brütten (Swiss Standard German pronunciation: [ˈbrʏtn̩]) is a municipality in the district of Winterthur, in the Canton of Zürich, Switzerland.

== History ==
Brütten is first mentioned in 876 as Pritta.

== Geography ==
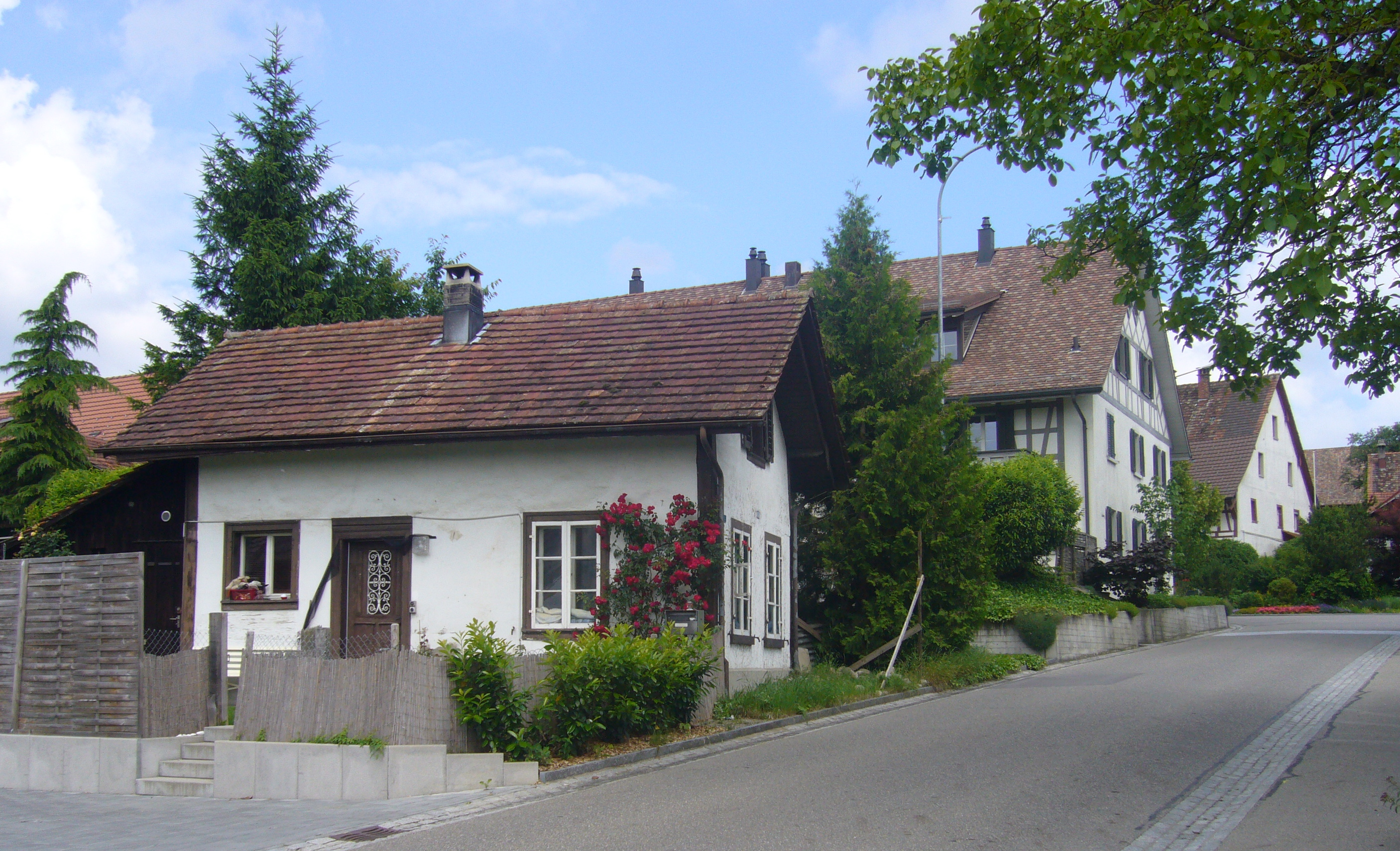
Within the village of Brütten.

Brütten has an area of 6.7 km^{2} (2.6 sq mi). Of this area, 58.9% is used for agricultural purposes, while 30.1% is forested. The rest of the land, (11%) is settled. In 1996 housing and buildings made up 6.1% of the total area, while transportation infrastructure made up the rest (4.6%). As of 2007 7.2% of the total municipal area was undergoing some type of construction.

The municipality is located on a high plateau west of the Kempt and Töss Valleys. It includes the village of Brütten along with the hamlets of Strubikon, Birch, Eich and since 1922 Obereich.

== Demographics ==
Brütten has a population (as of 31 December 2020) of 2,063. As of 2007, 5.7% of the population was made up of foreign nationals. As of 2008 the gender distribution of the population was 50.5% male and 49.5% female. Over the last 10 years the population has grown at a rate of 9.7%. Most of the population (as of 2000) speaks German (95.1%), with English being second most common ( 1.3%) and French being third ( 1.1%).

In the 2007 election the most popular party was the SVP which received 36.2% of the vote. The next three most popular parties were the FDP (16.7%), the SPS (12.7%) and the CSP (11.7%).

The age distribution of the population (as of 2000) is children and teenagers (0–19 years old) make up 24.1% of the population, while adults (20–64 years old) make up 64.4% and seniors (over 64 years old) make up 11.4%. The entire Swiss population is generally well educated. In Brütten about 90.1% of the population (between age 25-64) have completed either non-mandatory upper secondary education or additional higher education (either university or a Fachhochschule). There are 744 households in Brütten.

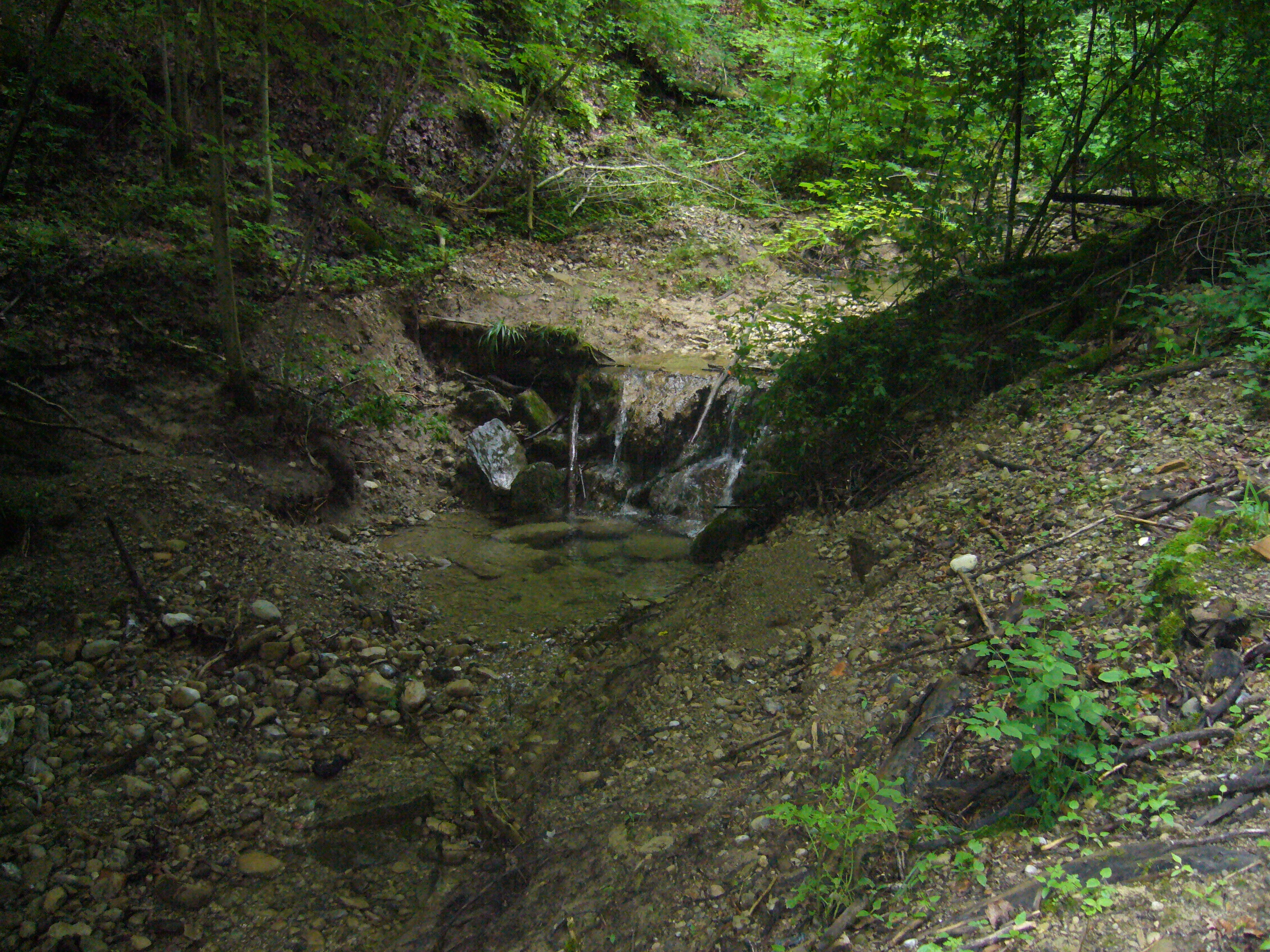
Waterfall in the Hubackertobel between Brütten and Winterthur.

Brütten has an unemployment rate of 1.22%. As of 2005, there were 92 people employed in the primary economic sector and about 29 businesses involved in this sector. 44 people are employed in the secondary sector and there are 16 businesses in this sector. 197 people are employed in the tertiary sector, with 49 businesses in this sector. As of 2007 54.4% of the working population were employed full-time, and 45.6% were employed part-time.

As of 2008 there were 391 Catholics and 1080 Protestants in Brütten. In the 2000 census, religion was broken down into several smaller categories. From the census, 64.4% were some type of Protestant, with 61.7% belonging to the Swiss Reformed Church and 2.6% belonging to other Protestant churches. 19.9% of the population were Catholic. Of the rest of the population, 0% were Muslim, 0.9% belonged to another religion (not listed), 2.1% did not give a religion, and 12.6% were atheist or agnostic.

The historical population is given in the following table:

year	population
1467	c.70
1634	230
1850	515
1900	462
1950	492
1970	671
2000	1,774
2010	1,927
2020	2,063
