= Nový Kramolín =

- Municipality
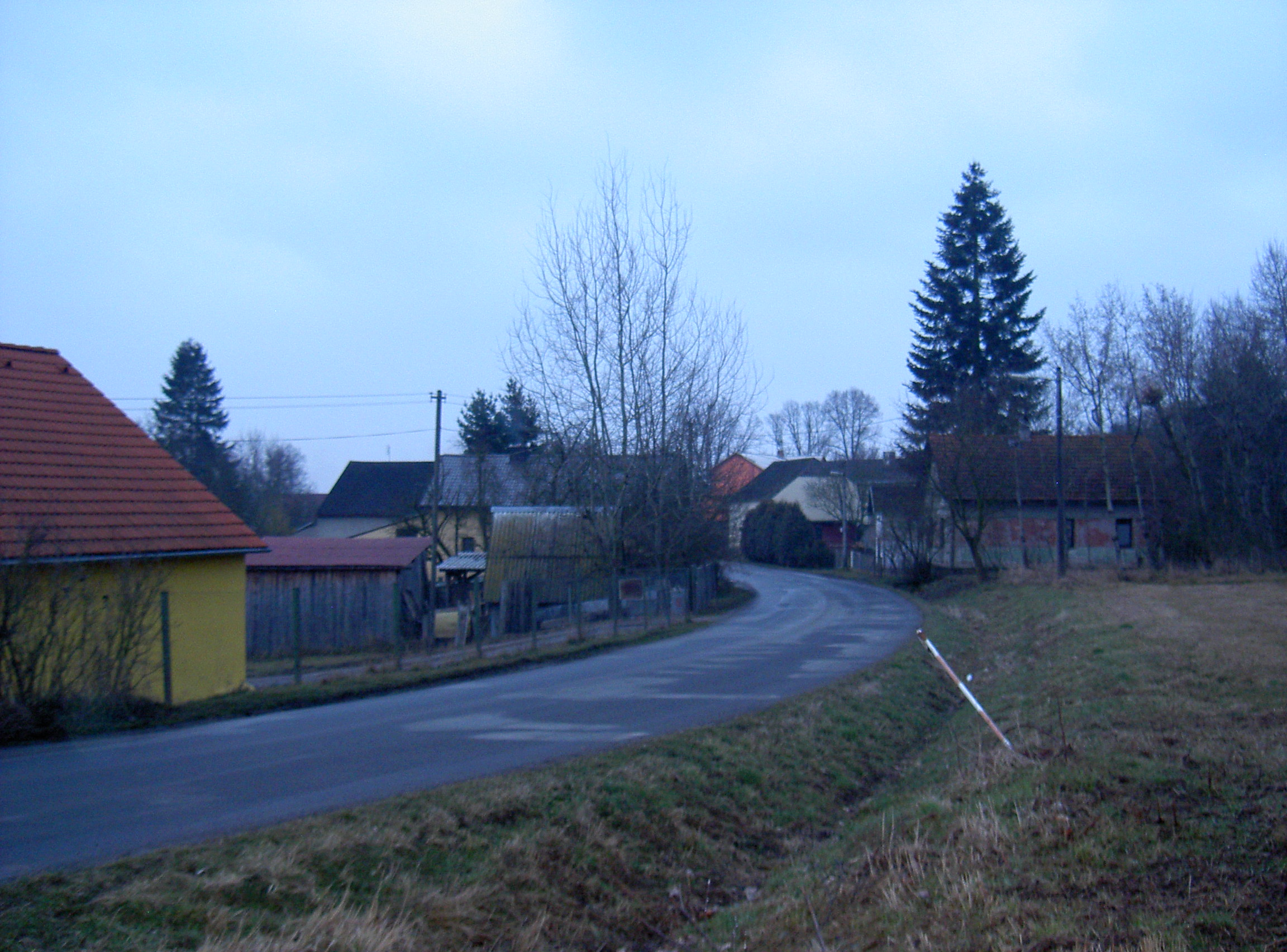
- A road in Nový Kramolín

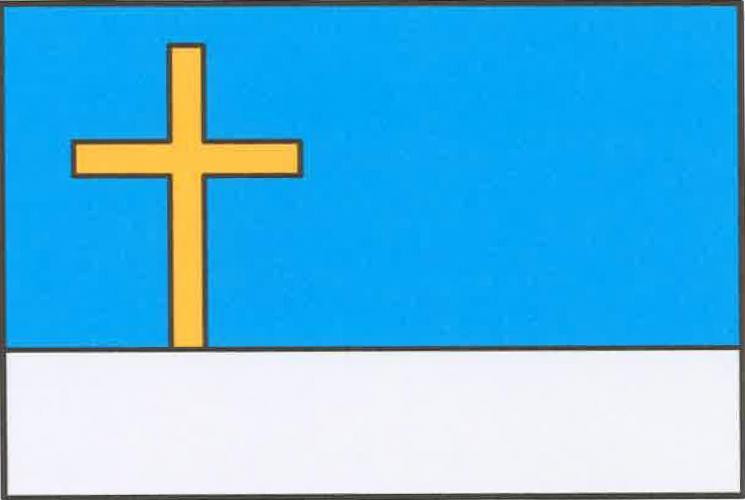
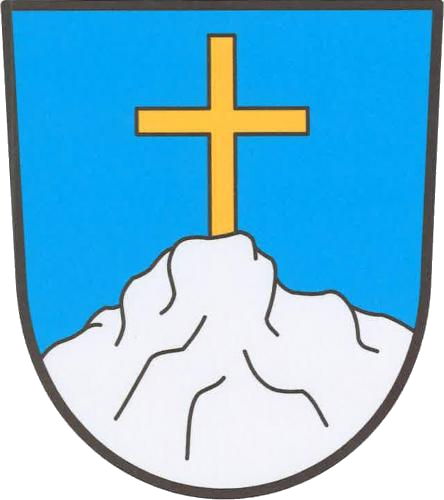
- Flag Coat of arms

- Location in the Czech Republic
- Coordinates: 49°28′39″N 12°48′18″E
- Country: Czech Republic
- Region: Plzeň
- District: Domažlice
- First mentioned: 1379

Area
  - Total: 9.19 km^{2} (3.55 sq mi)
- Elevation: 462 m (1,516 ft)

Population (2026-01-01)
  - Total: 236
  - Density: 25.7/km^{2} (66.5/sq mi)
- Time zone: UTC+1 (CET)
  - Summer (DST): UTC+2 (CEST)
- Postal code: 344 01
- Website: www.novykramolin.cz

Nový Kramolín is a municipality and village in Domažlice District in the Plzeň Region of the Czech Republic. It has about 200 inhabitants.

Nový Kramolín lies approximately 11 kilometres (7 mi) west of Domažlice, 53 km (33 mi) south-west of Plzeň, and 137 km (85 mi) south-west of Prague.

== Demographics ==
Historical population
| Year | Pop. | ±% |
|---|---|---|
| 1869 | 609 | — |
| 1880 | 548 | −10.0% |
| 1890 | 600 | +9.5% |
| 1900 | 630 | +5.0% |
| 1910 | 654 | +3.8% |
| 1921 | 609 | −6.9% |
| 1930 | 544 | −10.7% |
| 1950 | 192 | −64.7% |
| 1961 | 157 | −18.2% |
| 1970 | 204 | +29.9% |
| 1980 | 179 | −12.3% |
| 1991 | 202 | +12.8% |
| 2001 | 230 | +13.9% |
| 2011 | 230 | +0.0% |
| 2021 | 215 | −6.5% |
Source: Censuses
