= Zurich railway station (disambiguation) =

Zürich railway station, or Zurich railway station, may refer to a number of railway stations:

- Zürich Affoltern railway station
- Zürich Airport railway station
- Zürich Altstetten railway station
- Zürich Binz railway station
- Zürich Brunau railway station
- Zürich Enge railway station
- Zürich Friesenberg railway station
- Zürich Giesshübel railway station
- Zürich Hardbrücke railway station
- Zürich Hauptbahnhof railway station
- Zürich Leimbach railway station
- Zürich Letten railway station
- Zürich Manegg railway station
- Zürich Oerlikon railway station
- Zürich Saalsporthalle-Sihlcity railway station
- Zürich Schweighof railway station
- Zürich Seebach railway station
- Zürich Selnau railway station
- Zürich Stadelhofen railway station
- Zürich Tiefenbrunnen railway station
- Zürich Triemli railway station
- Zürich Wiedikon railway station
- Zürich Wipkingen railway station
- Zürich Wollishofen railway station
