= Sood-Oberleimbach railway station =

Railway station in north-east Switzerland

Sood-Oberleimbach
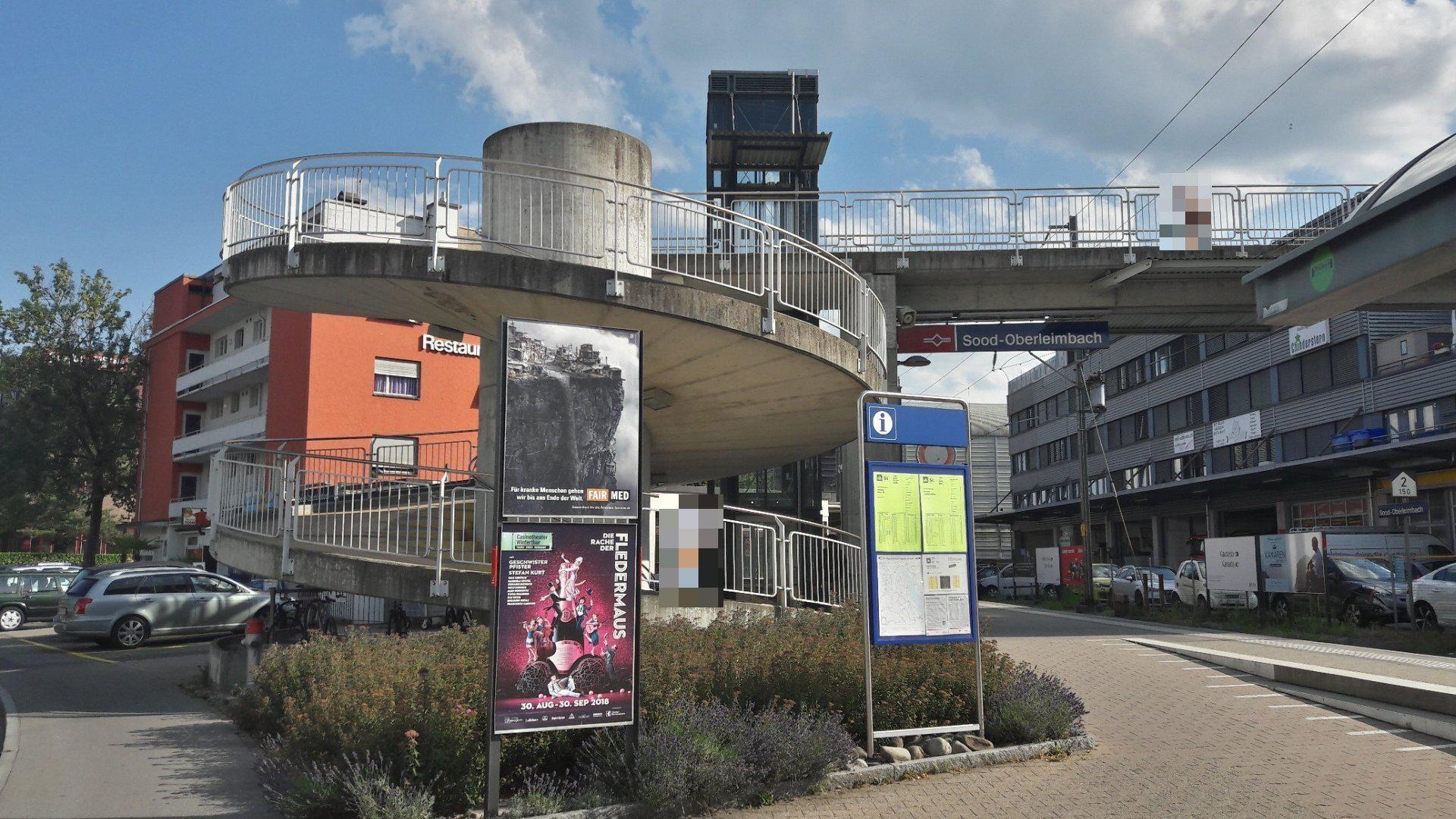
- Sood-Oberleimbach railway station in 2018

General information
- Location: Soodstrasse, Adliswil, Canton of Zürich, Switzerland
- Coordinates: 47.319697°N 8.521501°E
- Elevation: 443 m (1,453 ft)
- Owner: Sihltal Zürich Uetliberg Bahn
- Operator: Sihltal Zürich Uetliberg Bahn
- Line: Sihltal line
- Platforms: 1 side platform

Other information
- Fare zone: ZVV 150

Services
Preceding station	Zurich S-Bahn	Following station
Adliswil towards Sihlwald	S4	Zürich Leimbach towards Zürich HB SZU
Adliswil towards Langnau-Gattikon	SN4 Limited service	Zürich Leimbach towards Zürich HB SZU
Location

Sood-Oberleimbach is a railway station in the Sihl Valley, and the municipality of Adliswil, in the Swiss Canton of Zurich, within fare zone 150 of the Zürcher Verkehrsverbund (ZVV). The station is on the Sihltal line, which is operated by the Sihltal Zürich Uetliberg Bahn (SZU).

== Services ==
The station is served by the following S-Bahn train services:

Operator	Train Type	Route	Typical Frequency	Notes
SZU	S4	Zürich HB - Zürich Selnau - Zürich Giesshübel - Zürich Saalsporthalle-Sihlcity - Zürich Brunau - Zürich Manegg - Zürich Leimbach - Sood-Oberleimbach - Adliswil - Sihlau - Wildpark-Höfli - Langnau-Gattikon - Sihlwald	3-6 trains per hour	Part of Zurich S-Bahn. 1 train per hour beyond Langnau-Gattikon
SZU	SN4	Zürich HB - Zürich Selnau - Zürich Giesshübel - Zürich Saalsporthalle-Sihlcity - Zürich Brunau - Zürich Manegg - Zürich Leimbach - Sood-Oberleimbach - Adliswil - Sihlau - Wildpark-Höfli - Langnau-Gattikon	Friday/Saturday late night/early morning (also in operation for special occasions)	Zurich S-Bahn nighttime service. Hourly arriving from 01:23-04:23 and departing from 01:43-03:43
