= Sihlwald railway station =

Railway station in Horgen, Switzerland

Sihlwald
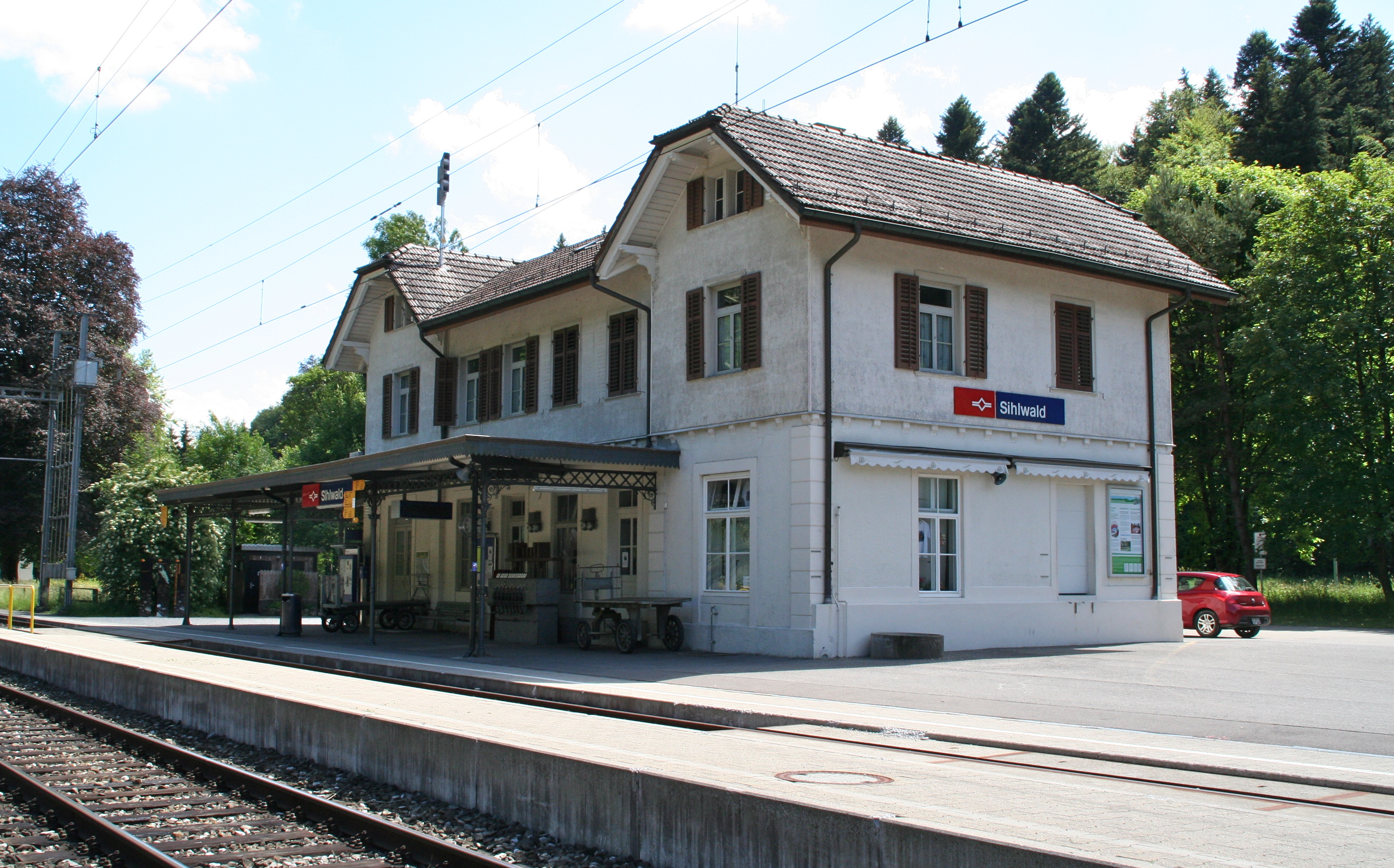

General information
- Location: Alte Sihltalstrasse, Horgen, Canton of Zürich; Switzerland
- Coordinates: 47.2683°N 8.5575°E
- Elevation: 488 m (1,601 ft)
- Owner: Sihltal Zürich Uetliberg Bahn
- Operator: Sihltal Zürich Uetliberg Bahn
- Line: Sihltal line
- Platforms: 1 side platform

History
- Opened: 1892

Services
Preceding station	Zurich S-Bahn	Following station
Terminus	S4	Langnau-Gattikon towards Zürich HB SZU
Location
- Location within Canton of Zurich

Sihlwald is a railway station in the Sihl Valley, in the municipality of Horgen, Canton of Zurich, Switzerland. The station is on the Sihltal line, which is operated by the Sihltal Zürich Uetliberg Bahn (SZU). The station takes its name from the Sihlwald forest and nature reserve, whose visitor centre is adjacent to the station.

Sihlwald was the original terminus of the Sihtal line, which was opened from Bahnhof Selnau in Zurich in 1892. In 1897 the Sihltal line was extended to Sihlbrugg station and a connection with the Zürich to Lucerne line of the Swiss Northeastern Railway (NOB).

The station retains a locomotive shed dating from the time of that extension that is used by the heritage railway association Zürcher Museums-Bahn.

== History ==
Today, the station is the formal terminus of service S4 of the Zürich S-Bahn, although the situation within a protected forest and with few other traffic generators nearby means that most S4 trains terminate at Langnau-Gattikon, one stop nearer Zürich, leaving this station to be served by one train an hour. The stretch of railway beyond Sihlwald to Sihlbrugg still exists, but no longer carries a regular passenger train service.

== Services ==
The station is served by the following passenger train services:

Operator	Train Type	Route	Typical Frequency	Notes
SZU	S4	Zürich HB - Zürich Selnau - Zürich Giesshübel - Zürich Saalsporthalle-Sihlcity - Zürich Brunau - Zürich Manegg - Zürich Leimbach - Sood-Oberleimbach - Adliswil - Sihlau - Wildpark-Höfli - Langnau-Gattikon - Sihlwald	1 train per hour	Zurich S-Bahn

== Gallery ==
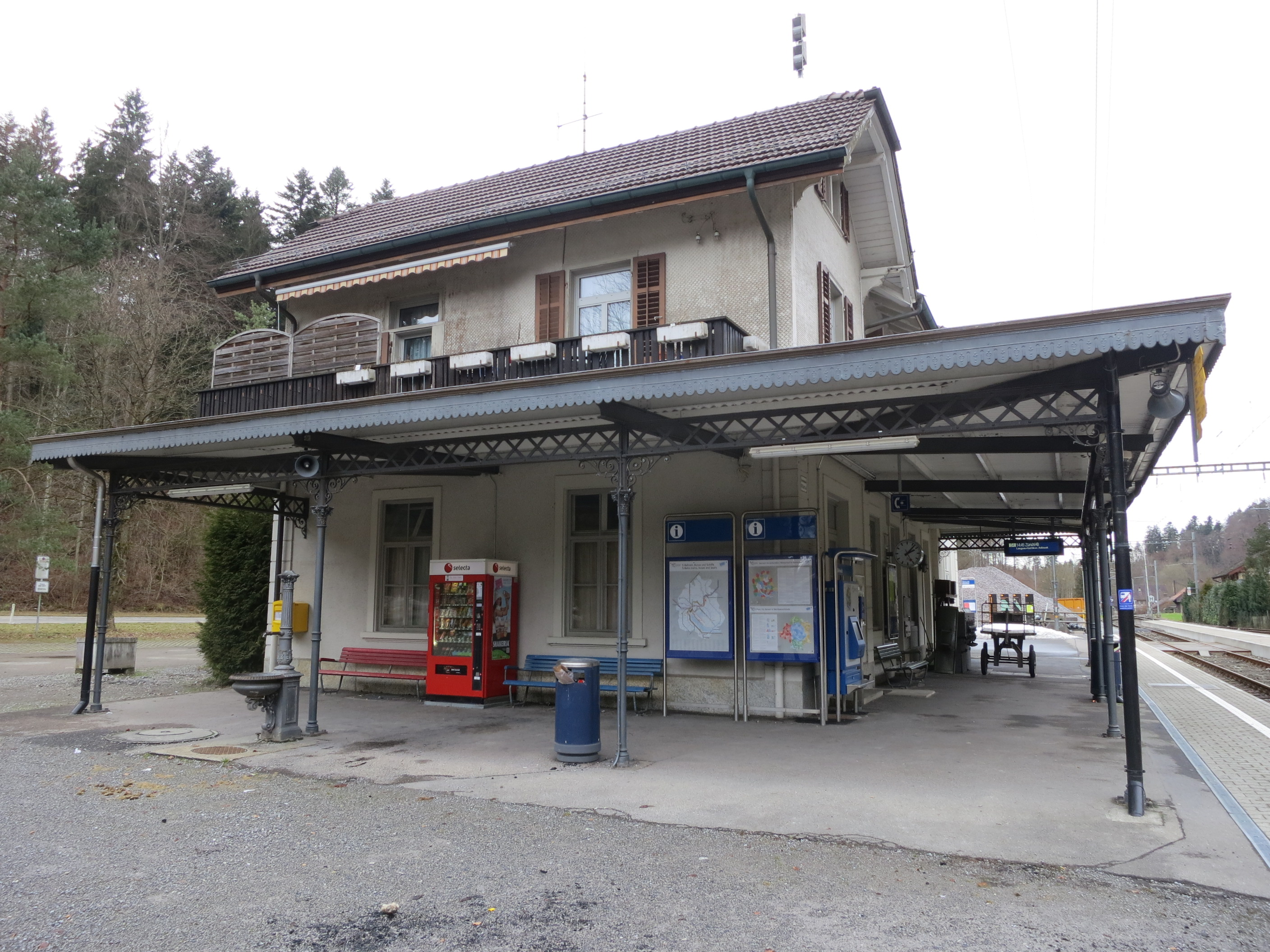
The station building

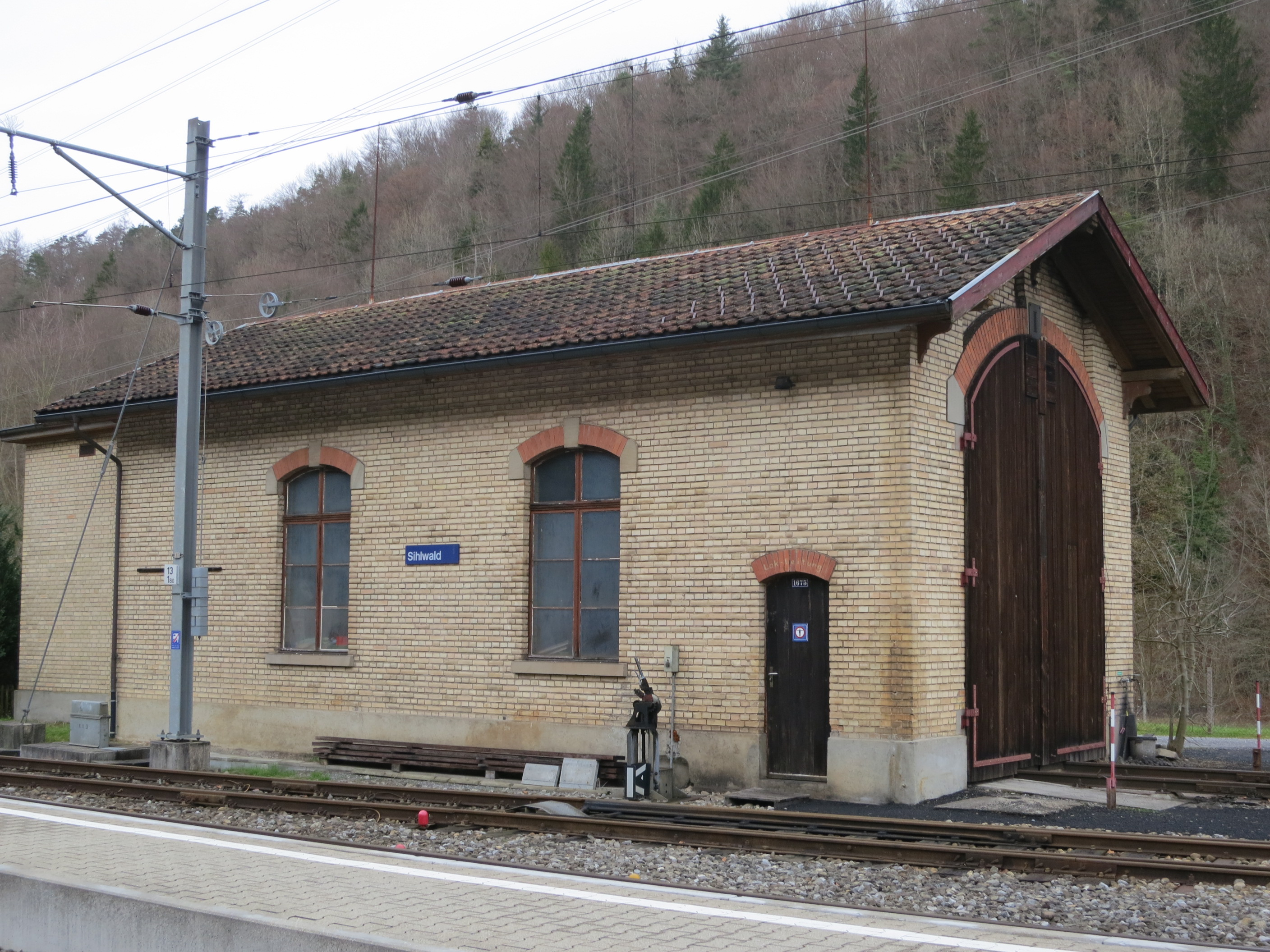
The locomotive shed
