= Sihlau railway station =

Railway station in Canton of Zürich, Switzerland

Sihlau
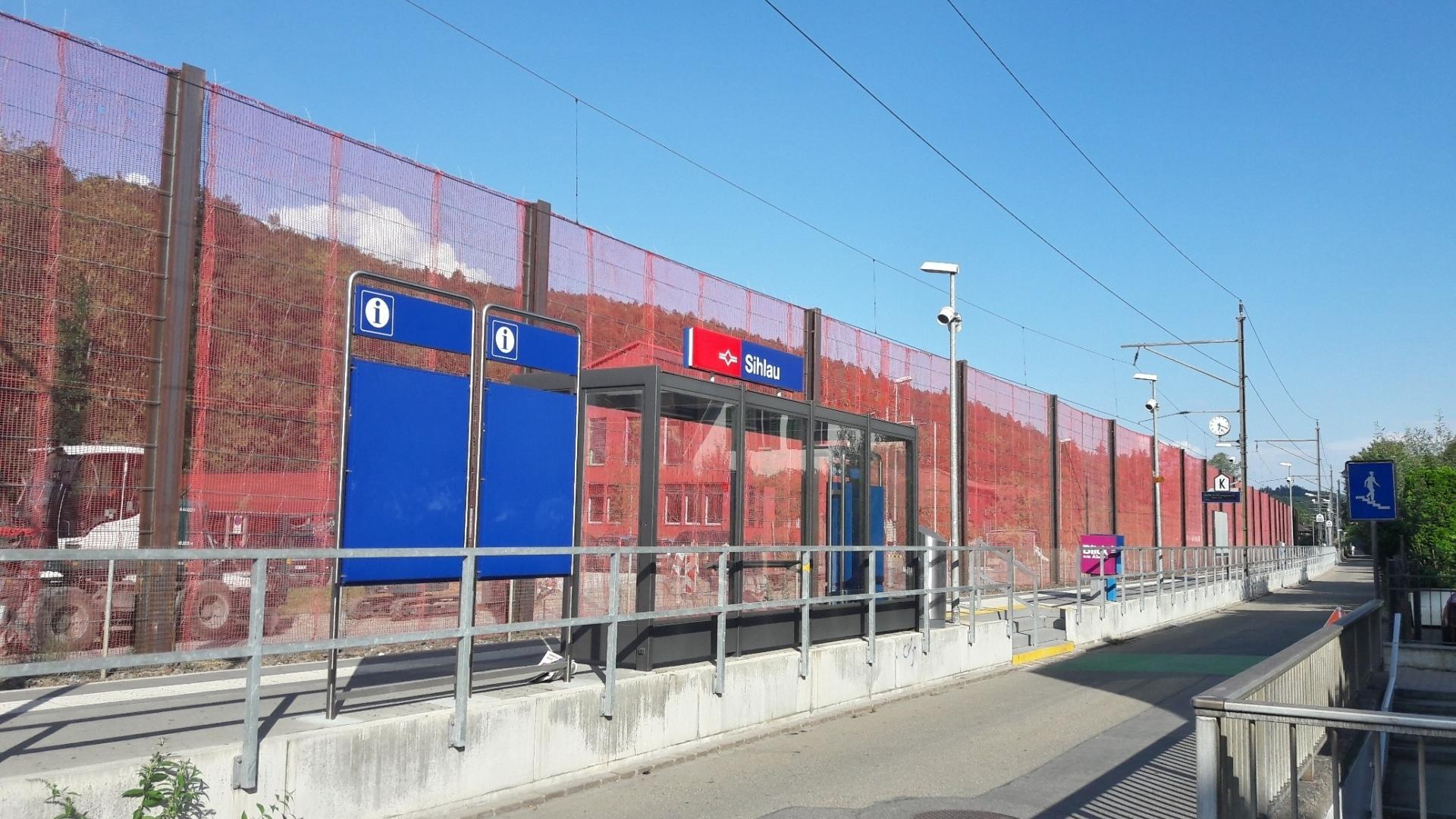
- Sihlau railway station in 2018

General information
- Location: Sihlaustrasse, Adliswil, Canton of Zürich, Switzerland
- Coordinates: 47.303171°N 8.525219°E
- Elevation: 456 m (1,496 ft)
- Owner: Sihltal Zürich Uetliberg Bahn
- Operator: Sihltal Zürich Uetliberg Bahn
- Line: Sihltal line

Services
Preceding station	Zurich S-Bahn	Following station
Wildpark-Höfli towards Sihlwald	S4	Adliswil towards Zürich HB SZU
Wildpark-Höfli towards Langnau-Gattikon	SN4 Limited service	Adliswil towards Zürich HB SZU
Location

Sihlau is a railway station in the Sihl Valley, and the municipality of Adliswil, in the Swiss Canton of Zurich. The station is on the Sihltal line, which is operated by the Sihltal Zürich Uetliberg Bahn (SZU). It takes its name from the nearby settlement of Sihlau.

== Services ==
The station is served by the following S-Bahn train services:

Operator	Train Type	Route	Typical Frequency	Notes
SZU	S4	Zürich HB - Zürich Selnau – Zürich Giesshübel – Zürich Saalsporthalle-Sihlcity – Zürich Brunau – Zürich Manegg – Zürich Leimbach – Sood-Oberleimbach – Adliswil – Sihlau – Wildpark-Höfli – Langnau-Gattikon - Sihlwald	3-6 trains per hour	Part of Zurich S-Bahn. 1 train per hour beyond Langnau-Gattikon
SZU	SN4	Zürich HB – Zürich Selnau – Zürich Giesshübel – Zürich Saalsporthalle-Sihlcity – Zürich Brunau – Zürich Manegg – Zürich Leimbach – Sood-Oberleimbach – Adliswil – Sihlau – Wildpark-Höfli – Langnau-Gattikon	Friday/Saturday late night/early morning (also in operation for special occasions)	Hourly arriving from 01:27–04:28 and departing from 01:40–04:35
