= Adliswil railway station =

Railway station in Canton of Zürich, Switzerland

Adliswil
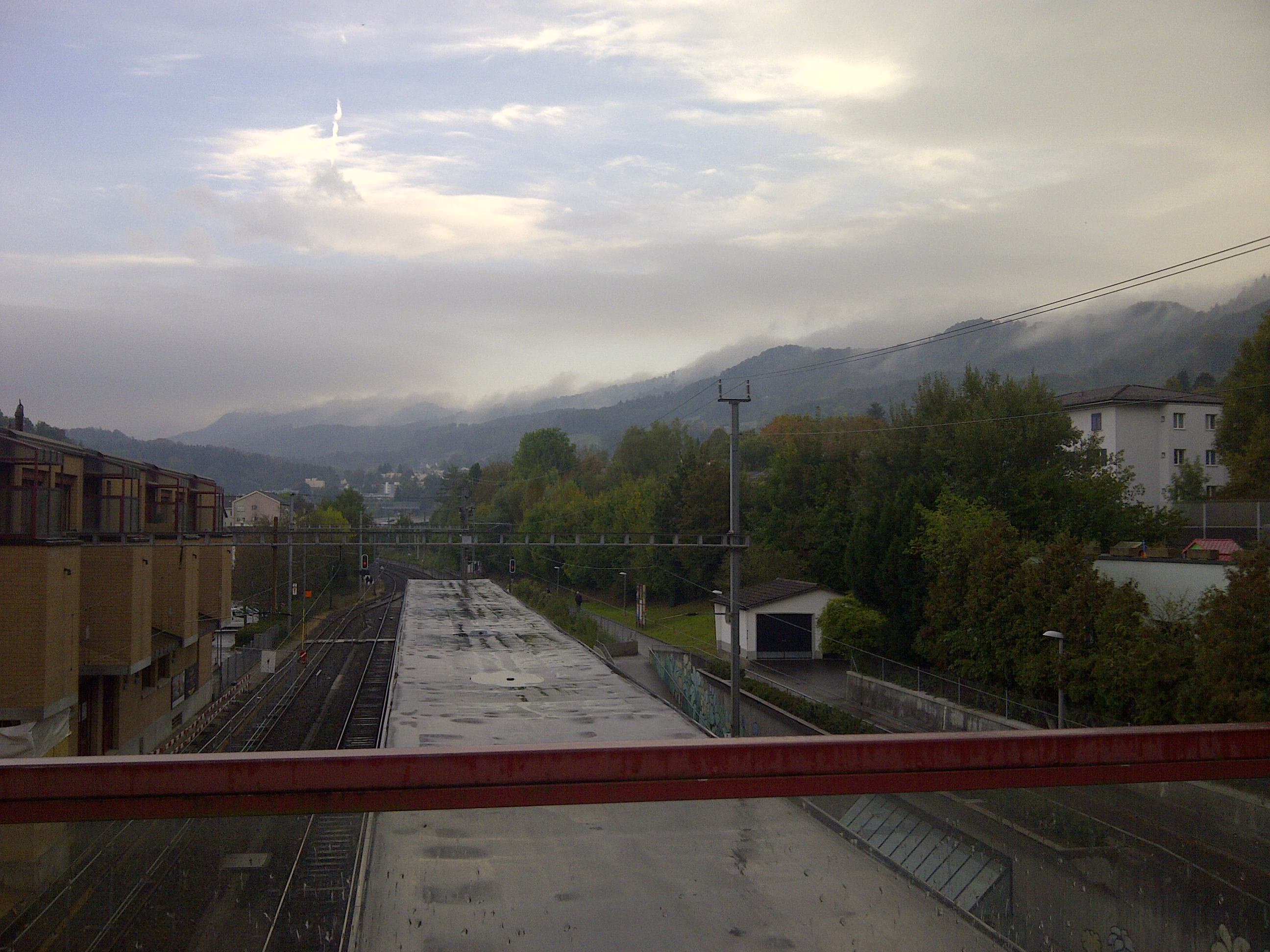
- Adliswil railway station from the pedestrian bridge

General information
- Location: Bahnhofplatz, Adliswil, Canton of Zurich, Switzerland
- Coordinates: 47.3124°N 8.5240°E
- Elevation: 452 m (1,483 ft)
- Owner: Sihltal Zürich Uetliberg Bahn
- Operator: Sihltal Zürich Uetliberg Bahn
- Line: Sihltal line
- Connections: Adliswil-Felsenegg cable car; Zimmerbergbus lines 151, 156, 184, 185

History
- Former names: Adlisweil

Services
Preceding station	Zurich S-Bahn	Following station
Sihlau towards Sihlwald	S4	Sood-Oberleimbach towards Zürich HB SZU
Sihlau towards Langnau-Gattikon	SN4 Limited service	Sood-Oberleimbach towards Zürich HB SZU
Location

Adliswil is a railway station in the Sihl Valley, and the municipality of Adliswil, in the Swiss Canton of Zürich. The station is on the Sihltal line, which is operated by the Sihltal Zürich Uetliberg Bahn (SZU).

The station is a short walking distance away from the valley station of the aerial lift to Felsenegg and the Albis ridge. A panoramic footpath runs along that ridge from the upper terminus to Uetliberg station on the SZU's Uetliberg line.

== Layout ==
The station has an island platform. It is located a ca. 400 m (1,300 ft) walk east of the valley station of the Adliswil-Felsenegg cable car, which provides a link to Felsenegg hill. It can be reached via the pedestrian bridge crossing the railway line.

== Services ==
The station is served by the following S-Bahn services:

Operator	Train Type	Route	Typical Frequency	Notes
SZU	S4	Zürich HB SZU – Zürich Selnau – Zürich Giesshübel – Zürich Saalsporthalle-Sihlcity – Zürich Brunau – Zürich Manegg – Zürich Leimbach – Sood-Oberleimbach – Adliswil – Sihlau – Wildpark-Höfli – Langnau-Gattikon – Sihlwald	3–6 trains per hour	Part of Zurich S-Bahn. 1 train per hour beyond Langnau-Gattikon
SZU	SN4	Zürich HB SZU – Zürich Selnau – Zürich Giesshübel – Zürich Saalsporthalle-Sihlcity – Zürich Brunau – Zürich Manegg – Zürich Leimbach – Sood-Oberleimbach – Adliswil – Sihlau – Wildpark-Höfli – Langnau-Gattikon	Friday/Saturday late night/early morning (also in operation for special occasions)	Zurich S-Bahn nighttime service. Hourly arriving from 01:26–04:26 and departing from 01:42–03:42
