= Sihlcity =

Coordinates: 47°21′30″N 8°31′21″E

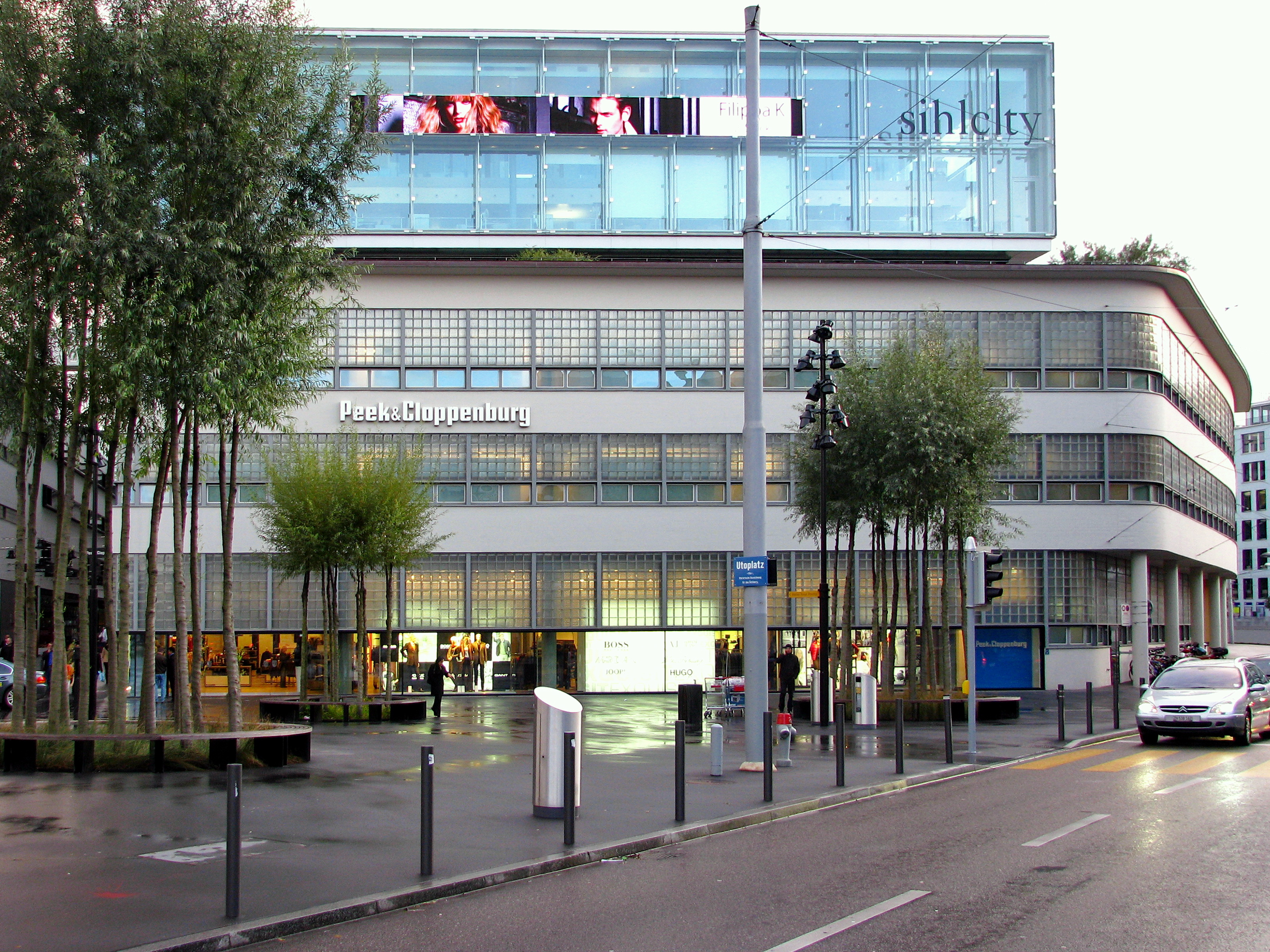
- View from the West (main entrance)
- Location: Zurich
- Address: Kalanderplatz 1; 8045 Zürich
- Opened: 2007
- Developer: Karl Steiner AG
- Architect: Theo Hotz AG
- Num. of stores: 80
- Floor area: 98,000 m^{2} (1,050,000 sq ft)
- Parking: 850 for cars (of which 50 are park and ride); 300 bike parking
- Public transit: Zürich Saalsporthalle (S4); 5 13; 72; 89 200 210 444 445
- Website: sihlcity.ch/de/home

Main hall in shopping center

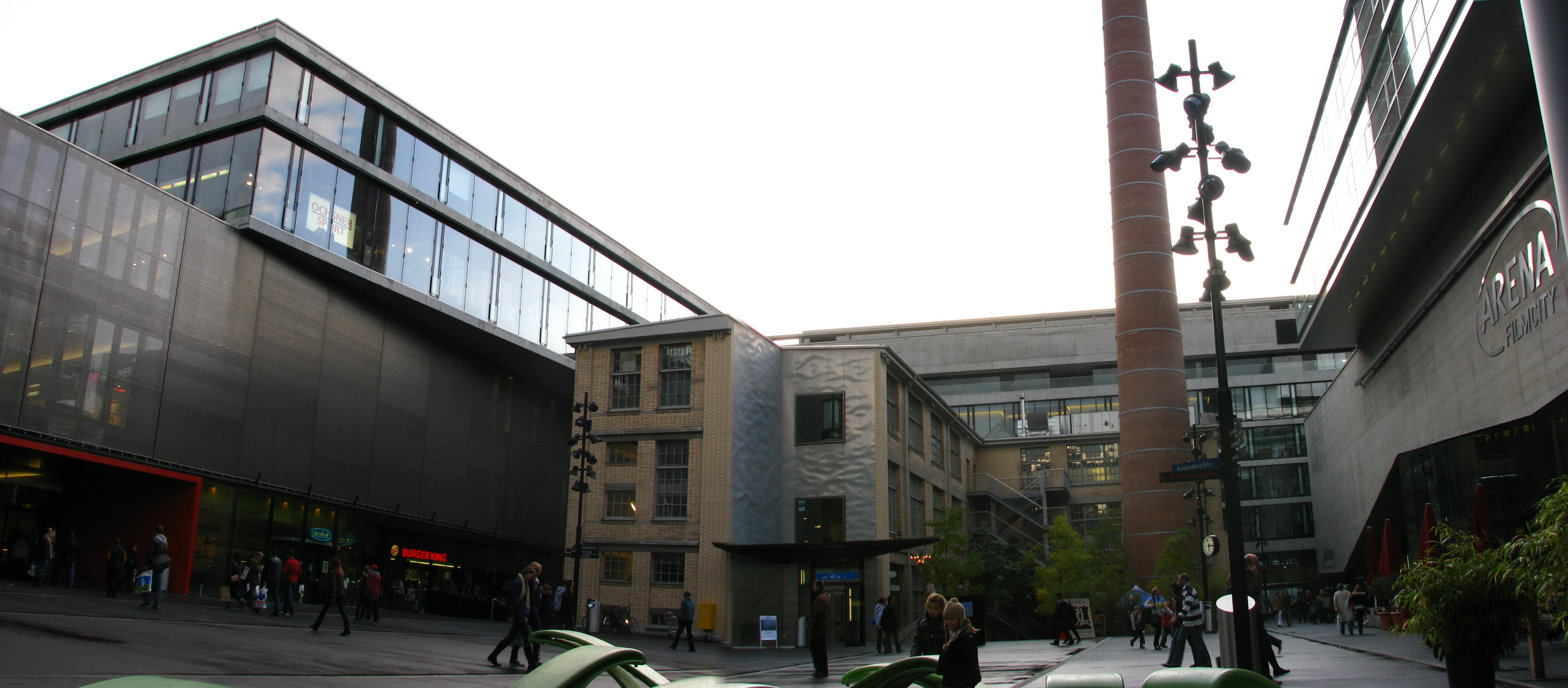
Main Place, seen from the North

Sihlcity is a shopping mall located in the Swiss city of Zurich which was built on the ground of a former paper mill near the Sihl river in the Wiedikon district. It opened on 22 March 2007.

It comprises some 100,000 m^{2} (1,100,000 sq ft) of rental space with a range of facilities, such as restaurants, a shopping center, a multiplex cinema, entertainment, health and fitness/wellness area (spa), nightclub, a chapel, and formerly a Four Points hotel. The now-vacant Four Points is being replaced in the summer of 2024 by a new hotel, The Home Hotel, with a French restaurant and interiors and decor inspired by the Dada movement.

Sihlcity is the place of work for 2,300 people. It has 20,000 daily visitors.

== Offers ==
Among others, Sihlcity offers the following shops, restaurants and entertainments.

- Arena Cinemas
- Butlers
- C&A
- Coop/Coop City
- Dosenbach
- Guess
- H&M
- Jack&Jones
- Joe & The Juice
- L'Occitane en Provence
- Läderach
- Levi's
- Marc O'Polo
- McDonald's
- MediaMarkt
- Mister Minit
- Mobility
- New Yorker
- Peek & Cloppenburg
- Sephora
- Starbucks
- Snipes
- Søstrene Grene
- Sunrise
- Swarovski
- Swisscom
- Triumph
- Vapiano
- Zara

== Transport ==
Zürich Saalsporthalle-Sihlcity railway station is adjacent to Sihlcity and is a stop on line S4 of the Zurich S-Bahn. It is a 5-minute ride on that line from Zurich Central Station (departs from Zürich HB SZU underground platforms).

The Zurich tram network also serves Sihlcity (tram/bus stop Sihlcity Nord) with routes 13 from/to Bahnhofstrasse/Paradeplatz and Central Station or 5 from/to Bürkliplatz and Bellevueplatz. Trolleybus line 72 and other bus lines also call at Sihlcity Nord.

== See also ==
- Europaallee
- Glattzentrum
- Seedamm-Center
