= Wildpark-Höfli railway station =

Station on the Zürich S-Bahn, Switzerland

Wildpark-Höfli
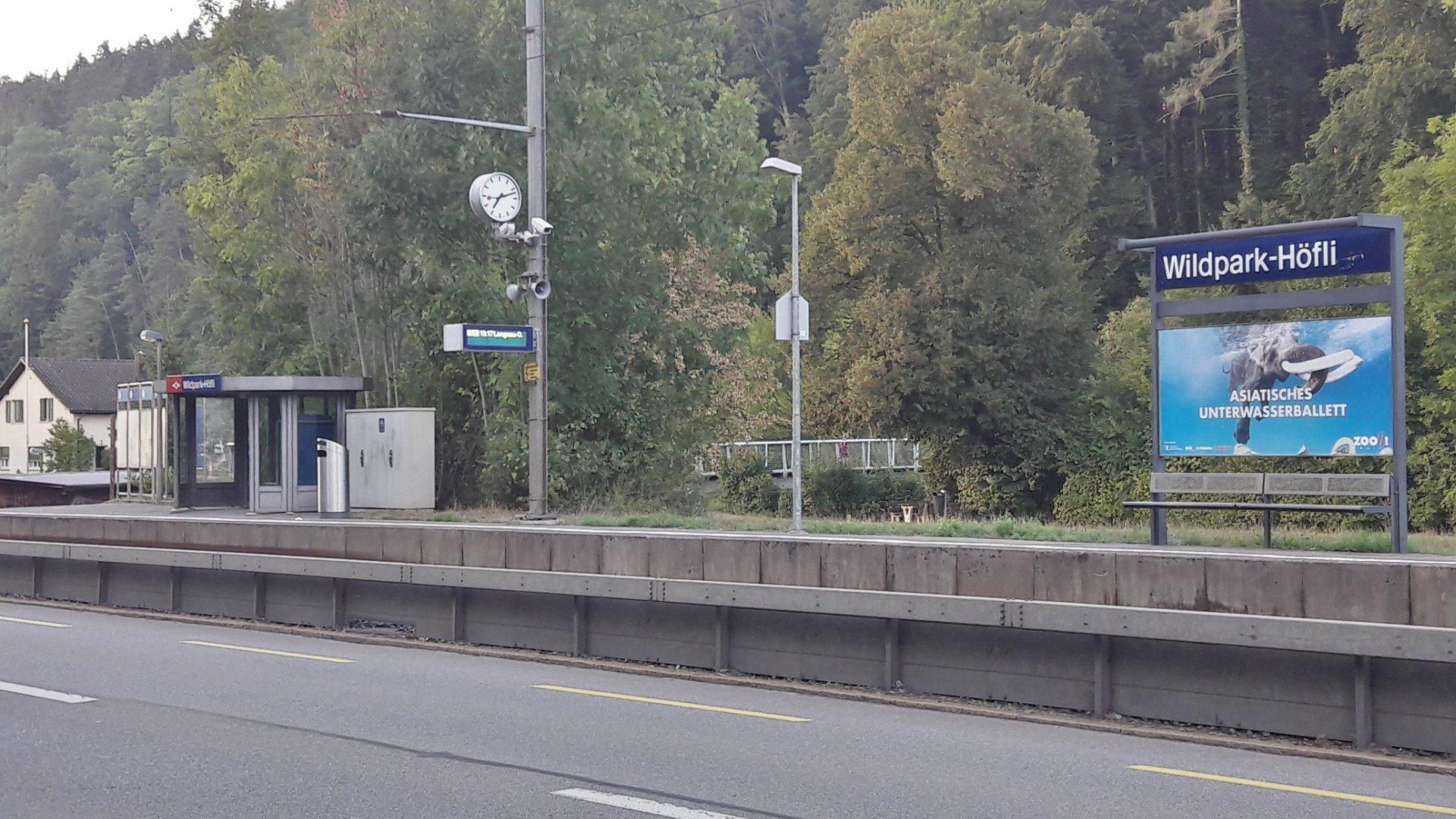
- Wildpark-Höfli railway station in 2018

General information
- Location: Zelgweg, Langnau am Albis, Canton of Zurich, Switzerland
- Coordinates: 47.296666°N 8.535079°E
- Elevation: 458 m (1,503 ft)
- Owner: Sihltal Zürich Uetliberg Bahn
- Operator: Sihltal Zürich Uetliberg Bahn
- Line: Sihltal line
- Platforms: 1 side platform
- Tracks: 1

Services
Preceding station	Zurich S-Bahn	Following station
Langnau-Gattikon towards Sihlwald	S4	Sihlau towards Zürich HB SZU
Langnau-Gattikon Terminus	SN4 Limited service	Sihlau towards Zürich HB SZU
Location

Wildpark-Höfli is a railway station in the Sihl Valley, and the municipality of Langnau am Albis, in the Swiss Canton of Zurich. The station is on the Sihltal line, which is operated by the Sihltal Zürich Uetliberg Bahn (SZU). Opened in 1982, it replaced the nearby Gontenbach station, which was located about 500 m (1,600 ft) north.

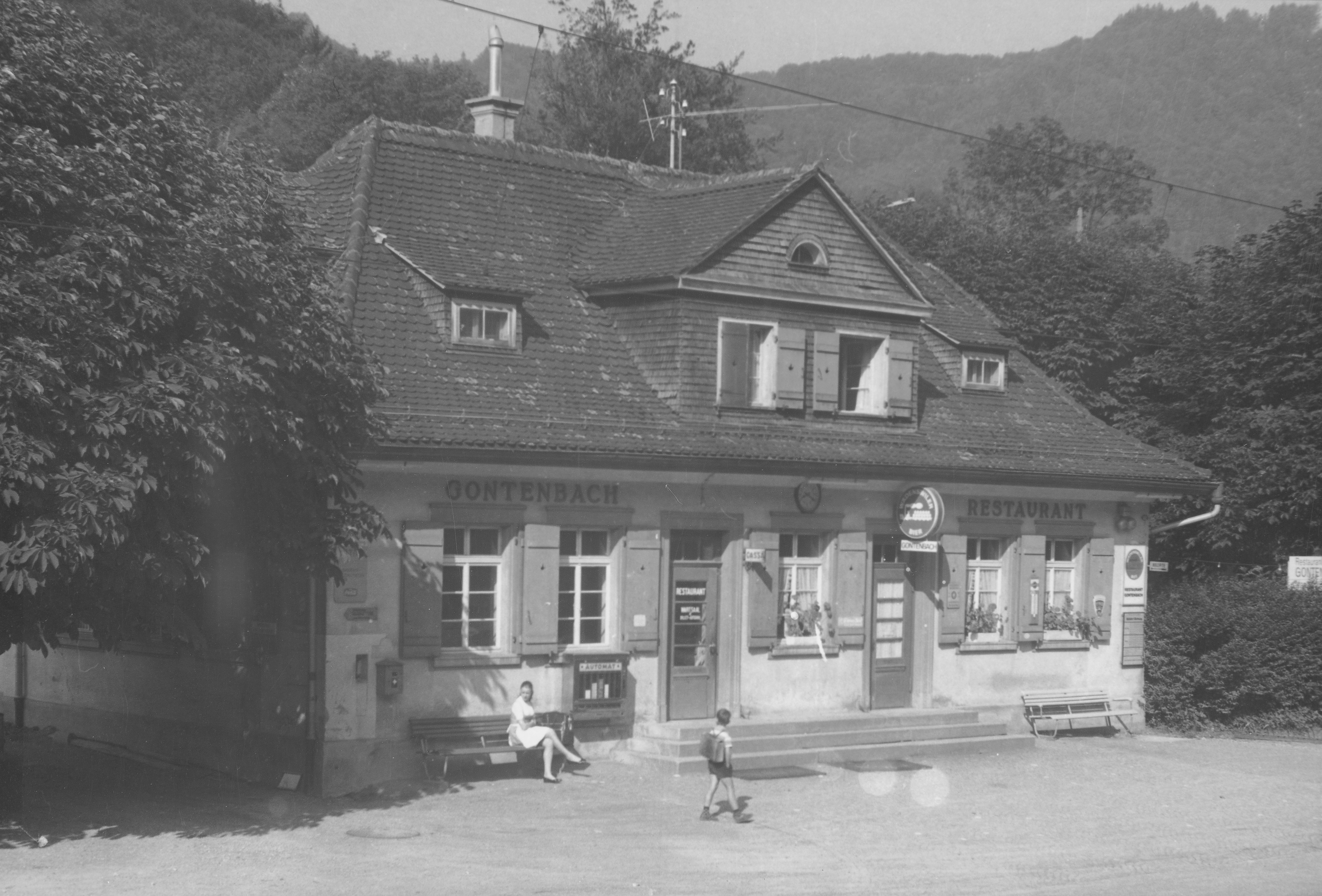
The replaced Gontenbach railway station in 1971

The station. which has a single side platform and track, takes its name from the nearby settlement of Höfli and the Wildpark Langenberg, a nearby zoo.

== Services ==
The station is served by the following S-Bahn trains:

Operator	Train Type	Route	Typical Frequency	Notes
SZU	S4	Zürich HB - Zürich Selnau - Zürich Giesshübel - Zürich Saalsporthalle-Sihlcity - Zürich Brunau - Zürich Manegg - Zürich Leimbach - Sood-Oberleimbach - Adliswil - Sihlau - Wildpark-Höfli - Langnau-Gattikon - Sihlwald	3 trains per hour	Part of Zurich S-Bahn. 1 train per hour beyond Langnau-Gattikon
SZU	SN4	Zürich HB - Zürich Selnau - Zürich Giesshübel - Zürich Saalsporthalle-Sihlcity - Zürich Brunau - Zürich Manegg - Zürich Leimbach - Sood-Oberleimbach - Adliswil - Sihlau - Wildpark-Höfli - Langnau-Gattikon	Friday/Saturday late night/early morning (also in operation for special occasions)	Zurich S-Bahn nighttime service. Hourly arriving from 01:29-04:29 and departing from 01:38-03:38
