= Zurich Brunau railway station =

Railway station in the Swiss city of Zürich

Zürich Brunau
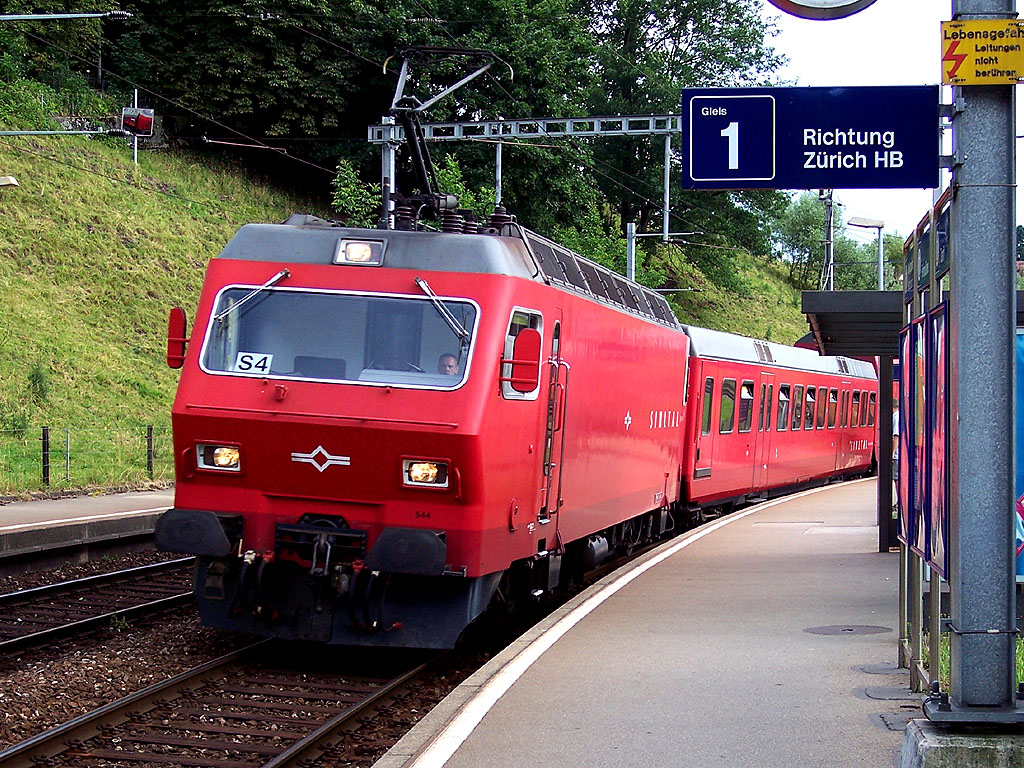
- An S4 Sihltalbahn train of Sihltal Zürich Uetliberg Bahn (SZU), headed by Re 456 544, arrives at Zürich Brunau station

General information
- Location: Allmendstrasse, City of Zürich, Canton of Zürich, Switzerland
- Coordinates: 47.351952°N 8.526496°E
- Elevation: 422 m (1,385 ft)
- Owner: Sihltal Zürich Uetliberg Bahn
- Operator: Sihltal Zürich Uetliberg Bahn
- Line: Sihltal line
- Platforms: 2 side platforms

Other information
- Fare zone: ZVV 110

Services
Preceding station	Zurich S-Bahn	Following station
Zürich Manegg towards Sihlwald	S4	Zürich Saalsporthalle towards Zürich HB SZU
Zürich Manegg towards Langnau-Gattikon	SN4 Limited service	Zürich Saalsporthalle towards Zürich HB SZU
Location

Zürich Brunau (German: Zürich Brunau) is a railway station in the Swiss city of Zurich. The station is within fare zone 110 of the Zürcher Verkehrsverbund (ZVV) and located on the Sihltal line, which is owned and operated by the Sihltal Zürich Uetliberg Bahn (SZU).

== Services ==
The station is served by the following S-Bahn trains:

Operator	Train Type	Route	Typical Frequency	Notes
SZU	S4	Zürich HB - Zürich Selnau - Zürich Giesshübel - Zürich Saalsporthalle-Sihlcity - Zürich Brunau - Zürich Manegg - Zürich Leimbach - Sood-Oberleimbach - Adliswil - Sihlau - Wildpark-Höfli - Langnau-Gattikon - Sihlwald	3-6 trains per hour	Part of Zurich S-Bahn. 1 train per hour beyond Langnau-Gattikon
SZU	SN4	Zürich HB - Zürich Selnau - Zürich Giesshübel - Zürich Saalsporthalle-Sihlcity - Zürich Brunau - Zürich Manegg - Zürich Leimbach - Sood-Oberleimbach - Adliswil - Sihlau - Wildpark-Höfli - Langnau-Gattikon	Friday/Saturday late night/early morning (also in operation for special occasions)	Zurich S-Bahn nighttime service. Hourly arriving from 01:16-04:16 and departing from 01:49-03:49

== See also ==
- List of railway stations in Zurich
- Public transport in Zurich
