= List of railway stations in Zurich =

This is a sortable list of railway stations in the city of Zurich, Switzerland, with further information (see below for a map). In total, there are 29 railway stations, of which one is closed. Most stations are on 1,435 mm (4 ft 8 1/2 in) standard-gauge lines, while four of them are tram stops along the 1,000 mm (3 ft 3 3/8 in) metre-gauge tram network, served by a light rail (S18) that continues on its own tracks outside of the city.

The stations lie in the fare zone 110 of the Zürcher Verkehrsverbund (ZVV). They are served by commuter trains of the Zurich S-Bahn and are also well-connected with the Zurich tram and trolleybus network as well as with municipal and regional buses. Long-distance trains (categories: TGV, RJX, ICE, EC, IC, IR, RE, EN, NJ) call at the Main Railway Station, Zürich Hauptbahnhof (Zürich HB), with some IC, IR and RE services also serving Zürich Altstetten and Zürich Oerlikon stations.

Zürich HB is the busiest railway station in Switzerland, and three other railway stations in Zurich (Oerlikon, Stadelhofen and Hardbrücke) rank among the top ten in the country. Most stations are through stations. Zürich HB and Zürich HB SZU are cul-de-sac stations, while Oerlikon is a Keilbahnhof.

Name		Line(s)	Services			District
Name		Line(s)	Day-time	Night-time S-Bahn	Tram / Bus / Boat	District
Stettbach		Zürichberg Line	S3 S9 S11 S12	SN1 SN5 SN6 SN9	7 12 743 744 745 751 752 754 760	12
Zürich Affoltern		Wettingen–Effretikon	S6 S21	SN6	37 44 61 62 492	11
Zürich Altstetten		Zurich–Baden, Zurich–Affoltern am Albis–Zug	S5 S11 S12 S14 S19 S42	SN1 SN5	20 51 31 45 78 80 83 89 304 307 485	9
Zürich Balgrist		Zurich tram network	S18	SN18	4 77 99	7 / 8
Zürich Binz		Uetliberg Line	S10	—	76	3
Zürich Brunau		Sihltal Line	S4	SN4	—	2
Zürich Enge		Lake Zurich Left-Bank Line	S2 S8 S24	SN8	5 7 8 13 66 200 210 444 445	2
Zürich Friesenberg		Uetliberg Line	S10	—	32	3
Zürich Giesshübel		Sihltal Line	S4	SN4	—	3
Zürich Hardbrücke		Zurich–Baden, Käferberg Line	S3 S5 S6 S7 S9 S11 S12 S15 S16 S20 S21	SN1 SN5 SN6 SN7 SN9	8 33 72 83	5
Zürich HB (Main Station)	Surface (Note: Tracks (Gleis) 3–18)	Käferberg Line, Lake Zurich Left-Bank Line, Zurich–Baden, Wipkingen Line	RJX NJ EC EN ICE 12 ICE/ECE 20 IC 87 RE37 RE48 S21 S24 S25 S42	—	3 4 6 7 10 11 13 14 15 17 50 51 31 46 ZSG	1
Zürich HB (Main Station)	SZU station (Note: Tracks (Gleis) 21–22)	Sihltal Line, Uetliberg Line	S4 S10	SN4	3 4 6 7 10 11 13 14 15 17 50 51 31 46 ZSG	1
Zürich HB (Main Station)	Löwenstrasse (Note: Tracks (Gleis) 31–34)	Zurich–Baden, Weinberg Tunnel	S2 S8 S14 S19	SN8	3 4 6 7 10 11 13 14 15 17 50 51 31 46 ZSG	1
Zürich HB (Main Station)	Museumstrasse (Note: Tracks (Gleis) 41–44)	Zurich–Baden, Käferberg Line, Hirschengraben Tunnel	S3 S5 S6 S7 S9 S11 S12 S15 S16 S20 S23	SN1 SN5 SN6 SN7 SN9	3 4 6 7 10 11 13 14 15 17 50 51 31 46 ZSG	1
Zürich Kreuzplatz		Zurich tram network	S18	SN18	2 4 31	7 / 8
Zürich Hegibachplatz		Zurich tram network	S18	SN18	4 31 33 77	7 / 8
Zürich Leimbach		Sihltal Line	S4	SN4	70	2
Zürich Letten (closed)		Lake Zurich Right-Bank Line	—	—	—	6
Zürich Manegg		Sihltal Line	S4	SN4	70	2
Zürich Oerlikon		Oerlikon–Bülach, Wettingen–Effretikon, Zürich–Winterthur	RE48 S3 S6 S7 S8 S9 S14 S15 S16 S19 S21 S24	SN6 SN7 SN8 SN9	10 50 51 61 62 64 75 80 768 781 787	11
Zürich Rehalp		Zurich–Esslingen Line	S18	SN18	4	8
Zürich Saalsporthalle		Sihltal Line	S4	SN4	5 13 89 200 210 444 445	2
Zürich Schweighof		Uetliberg Line	S10	—	89	3
Zürich Seebach		Wettingen–Effretikon	S6	SN6	(nearby: 51 40 42 75 768)	11
Zürich Selnau		Uetliberg Line	S4 S10	SN4	8	4
Zürich Stadelhofen		Lake Zurich Right-Bank Line, Zürichberg Line	S3 S5 S6 S7 S9 S11 S12 S15 S16 S20 S23	SN1 SN5 SN6 SN7 SN9	2 4 5 (nearby: 11 15 912 916 ZSG )	1
Zürich Stadelhofen FB		Zurich tram network	S18	SN18	2 4 5 (nearby: 11 15 912 916 ZSG )	1
Zürich Tiefenbrunnen		Lake Zurich Right-Bank Line	S6 S16	SN7	11 15 33 912 916 ZSG	8
Zürich Triemli		Uetliberg Line	S10	—	(nearby: 9 14 33 80 215 220 235 236 245 350)	3
Zürich Wiedikon		Lake Zurich Left-Bank Line	S2 S8 S24	SN8	9 14 67 76 215 220 235 236 245 350 (nearby: 2 3 32)	3
Zürich Wipkingen		Wipkingen Line	S24	—	33 46	10
Zürich Wollishofen		Lake Zurich Left-Bank Line	S8 S24	SN8	7 70 161 165 184 185 ZSG	2

== Map ==
The map shows railway lines in the city of Zurich (fare zone 110) with all railway stations and Zurich S-Bahn line numbers. Stations with names in bold are additionally served by long distance trains.

Omitted in the map are the connectors between Seebach and Glattbrugg/Opfikon, between Oerlikon and Altstetten, and between Altstetten and Wiedikon/Thalwil (all used by freight trains to bypass Zürich HB), and the connector between Wiedikon and Giesshübel which links the networks of Swiss Federal Railways and SZU.

== See also ==
- List of railway stations
- Public transport in Zurich
- Rail transport in Switzerland
