= Langnau-Gattikon railway station =

Railway station in Langnau am Albis, Switzerland

Langnau-Gattikon
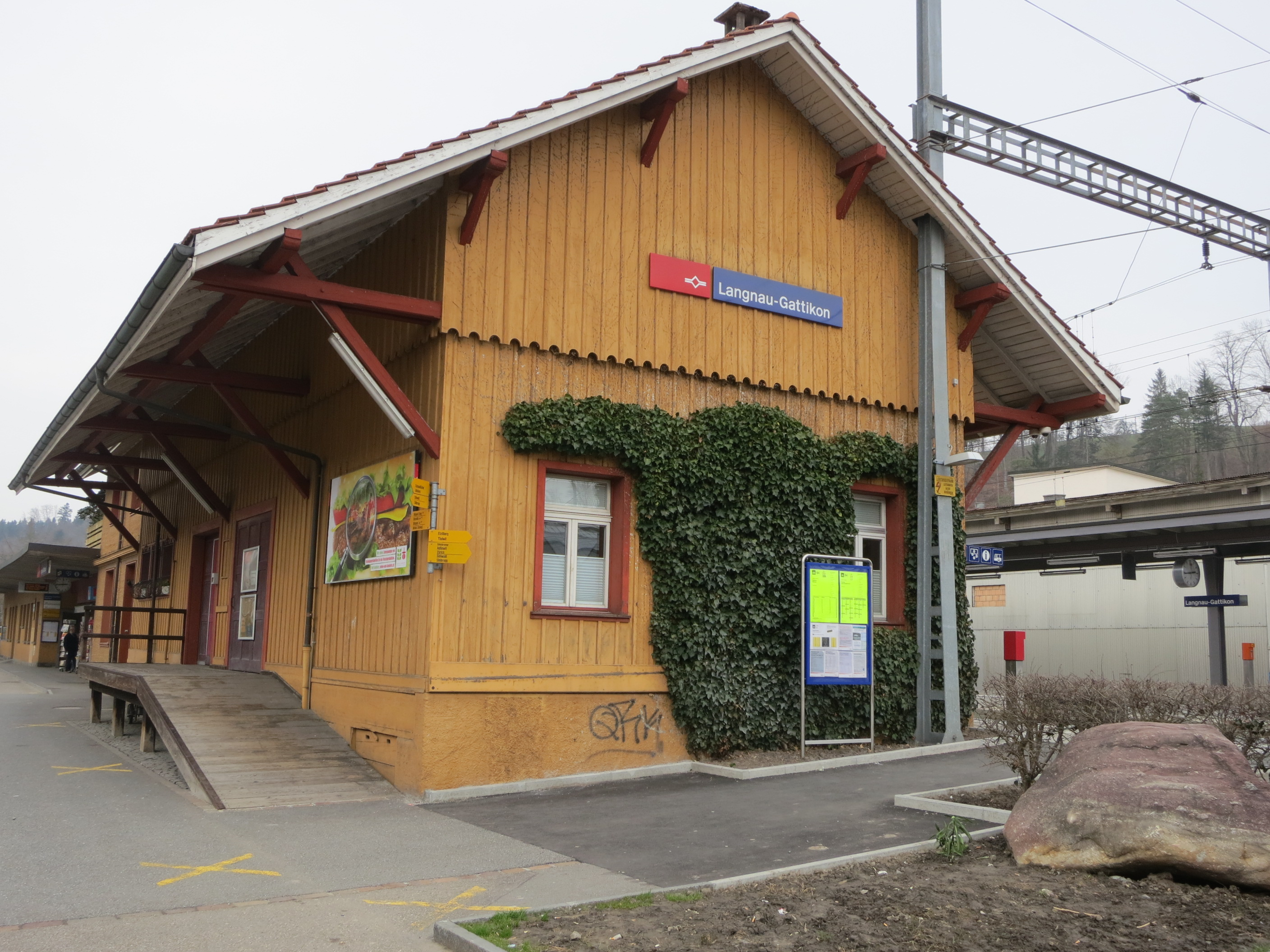

General information
- Location: Stationsstrasse, Langnau am Albis, Canton of Zürich, Switzerland
- Coordinates: 47.286704°N 8.544477°E
- Elevation: 468 m (1,535 ft)
- Owner: Sihltal Zürich Uetliberg Bahn
- Operator: Sihltal Zürich Uetliberg Bahn
- Line: Sihltal line
- Platforms: 1 island, 1 side platform
- Tracks: 3
- Connections: ZVV: Langnau-Gattikon, Bahnhof
- Bus: Zimmerbergbus lines 140, 153; PostAuto bus line 240

Services
Preceding station	Zurich S-Bahn	Following station
Sihlwald Terminus	S4	Wildpark-Höfli towards Zürich HB SZU
Terminus	SN4 Limited service	Wildpark-Höfli towards Zürich HB SZU
Location

Langnau-Gattikon is a railway station in the Sihl Valley, and the municipality of Langnau am Albis, in the Swiss Canton of Zurich. Gattikon is an adjacent settlement, part of the municipality of Thalwil. The station is on the Sihltal line, which is operated by the Sihltal Zürich Uetliberg Bahn (SZU).

== Services ==
=== S-Bahn ===
The station is served by the following S-Bahn train services:

Operator	Train Type	Route	Typical Frequency	Notes
SZU	S4	Zürich HB - Zürich Selnau - Zürich Giesshübel - Zürich Saalsporthalle-Sihlcity - Zürich Brunau - Zürich Manegg - Zürich Leimbach - Sood-Oberleimbach - Adliswil - Sihlau - Wildpark-Höfli - Langnau-Gattikon - Sihlwald	3-6 trains per hour to Zurich; 1 train per hour to Sihlwald	Zurich S-Bahn. 1 train per hour beyond Langnau-Gattikon
SZU	SN4	Zürich HB - Zürich Selnau - Zürich Giesshübel - Zürich Saalsporthalle-Sihlcity - Zürich Brunau - Zürich Manegg - Zürich Leimbach - Sood-Oberleimbach - Adliswil - Sihlau - Wildpark-Höfli - Langnau-Gattikon	Friday/Saturday late night/early morning (also in operation for special occasions)	Zurich S-Bahn nighttime service. Hourly arriving from 01:27-04:27 and departing from 01:40-03:40

=== Bus ===
Zimmerbergbus links the railway station with Gattikon and Thalwil railway station. A PostAuto line links the station with the Albis Pass.
