= Zürich Saalsporthalle railway station =

Railway station in the Swiss city of Zürich

Zürich Saalsporthalle
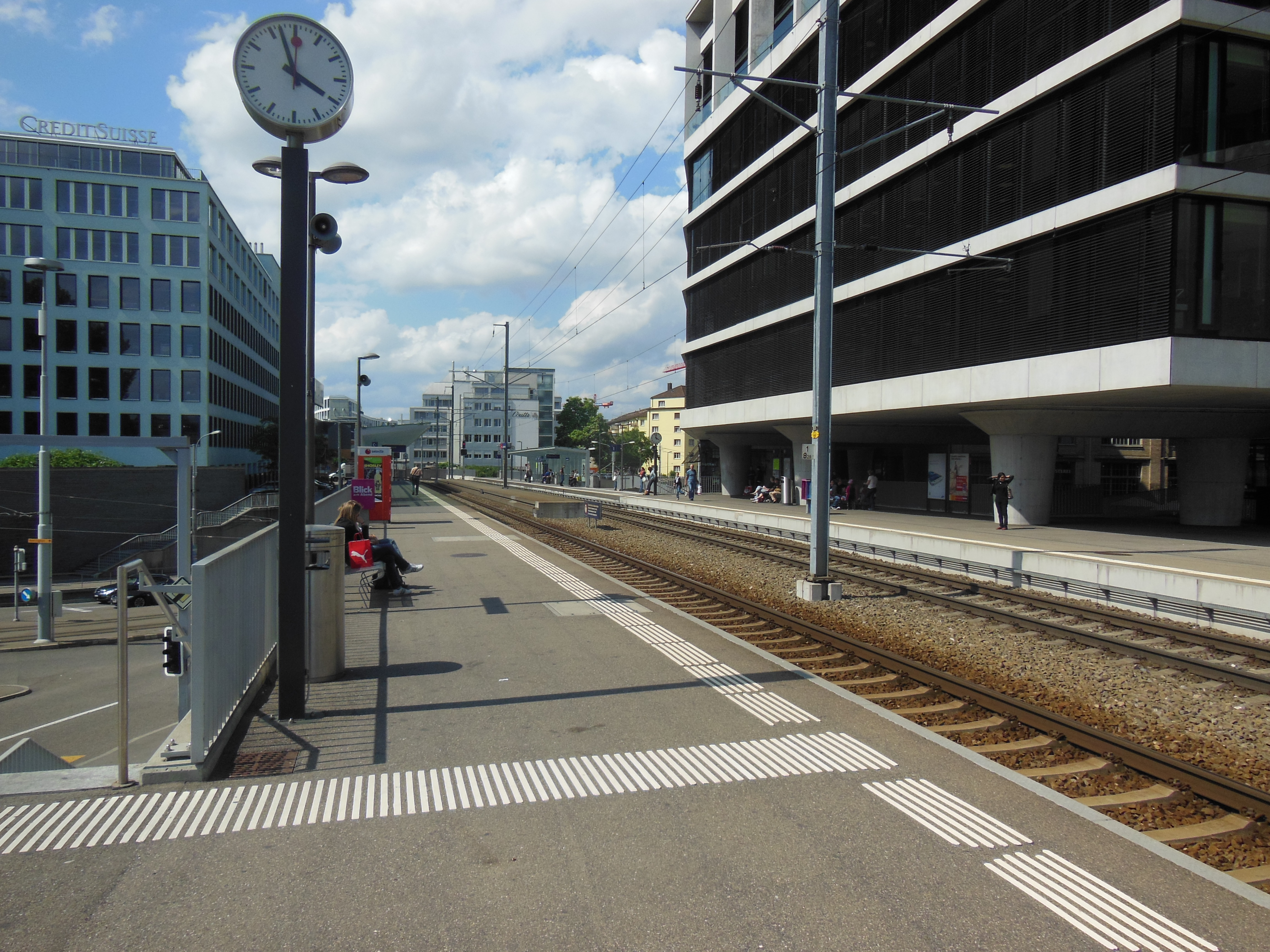
- Zürich Saalsporthalle station, with Sihlcity shopping centre to right

General information
- Location: Giesshübelstrasse/Allmendstrasse, 8045 Zurich, Canton of Zurich, Switzerland
- Coordinates: 47.3579°N 8.5218°E
- Elevation: 420 m (1,380 ft)
- Owner: Sihltal Zürich Uetliberg Bahn
- Operator: Sihltal Zürich Uetliberg Bahn
- Line: Sihltal line
- Platforms: 2 side platforms
- Connections: ZVV: Bhf. Saalsporthalle
- Tram: VBZ trams 5 13
- Bus: VBZ bus line 89; PostAuto bus lines 200 210; Aargau Verkehr bus lines 444 445

Other information
- Fare zone: ZVV 110

Services
Preceding station	Zurich S-Bahn	Following station
Zürich Brunau towards Sihlwald	S4	Zürich Giesshübel towards Zürich HB SZU
Zürich Brunau towards Langnau-Gattikon	SN4 Limited service	Zürich Giesshübel towards Zürich HB SZU
Location

Zürich Saalsporthalle (German: Zürich Saalsporthalle) is a railway station in the Swiss city of Zürich, adjacent to the Sihlcity shopping mall and the Saalsporthalle (a sports hall). It is located within fare zone 110 of the Zürcher Verkehrsverbund (ZVV). The station is on the Sihltal line which is operated by the Sihltal Zürich Uetliberg Bahn (SZU).

== Services ==
=== S-Bahn ===
The station is served by the following S-Bahn train services:

Operator	Train Type	Route	Typical Frequency	Notes
SZU	S4	Zurich HB - Zürich Selnau - Zürich Giesshübel - Zürich Saalsporthalle-Sihlcity - Zürich Brunau - Zürich Manegg - Zürich Leimbach - Sood-Oberleimbach - Adliswil - Sihlau - Wildpark-Höfli - Langnau-Gattikon - Sihlwald	3-6 trains per hour	Part of Zurich S-Bahn. 1 train per hour beyond Langnau-Gattikon
SZU	SN4	Zürich HB - Zürich Selnau - Zürich Giesshübel - Zürich Saalsporthalle-Sihlcity - Zürich Brunau - Zürich Manegg - Zürich Leimbach - Sood-Oberleimbach - Adliswil - Sihlau - Wildpark-Höfli - Langnau-Gattikon	Friday/Saturday late night/early morning (also in operation for special occasions)	Zürich S-Bahn nighttime service. Hourly arriving from 01:15-04:15 and departing from 01:51-03:51

=== Tram and bus ===
The adjacent tram stop is served by tram lines 5 (from/to Bürkliplatz and Bellevueplatz) and 13 (from/to Bahnhofstrasse) of the Zurich tram network, in addition to bus lines 89, 200, 210, 444 and 445 to Zürich Enge.

== See also ==
- List of railway stations in Zurich
- Public transport in Zurich
