= Sihltal railway line =

Railway service in Switzerland

Sihltal railway line (S4)
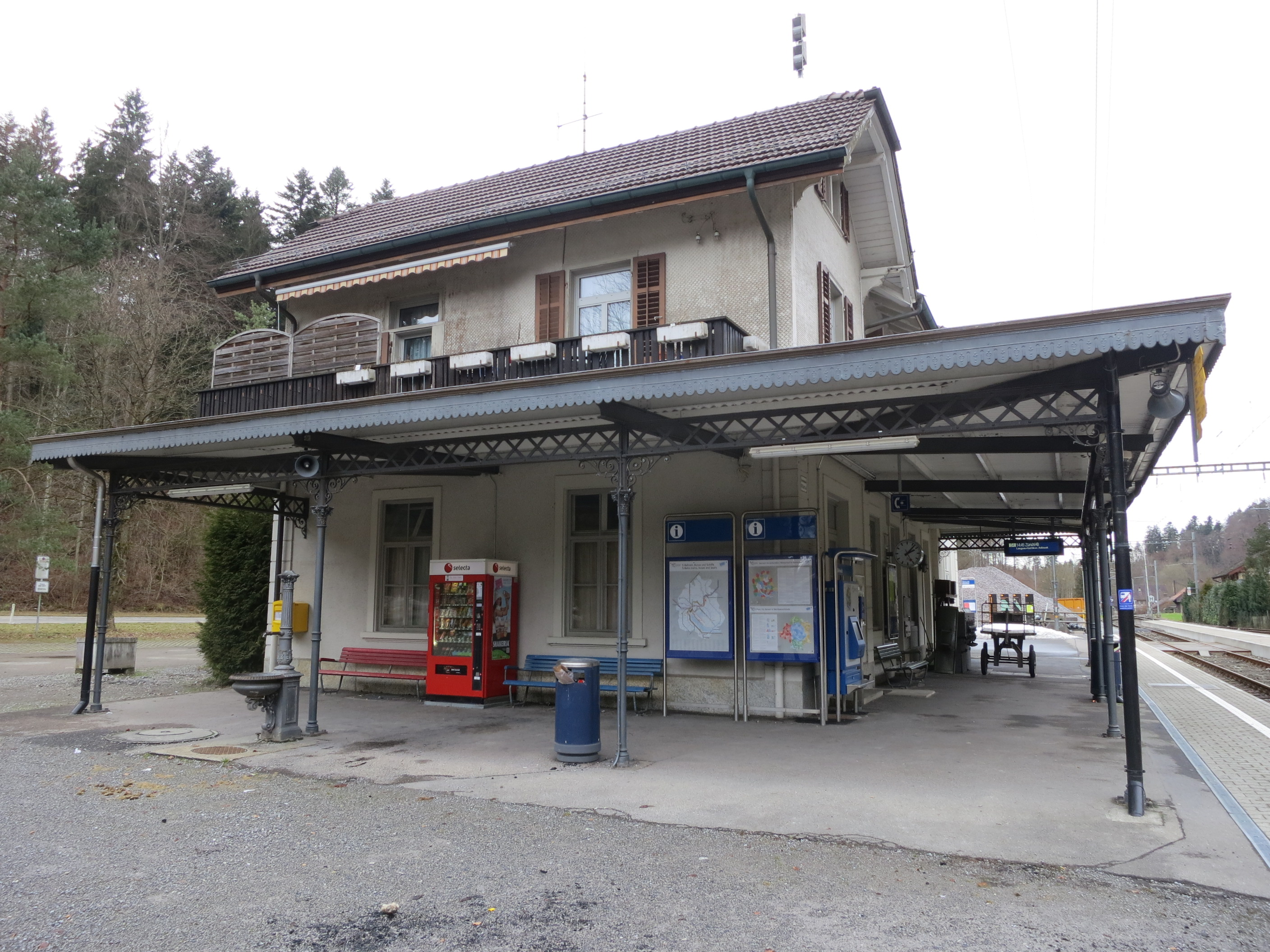
- Sihlwald is the passenger terminus

Overview
- Native name: Sihltalbahn
- Owner: SZU
- Line number: 712
- Locale: Zürich, Switzerland
- Termini: Zürich HB SZU; Sihlwald
- Stations: 13

Service
- Operator(s): SZU

History
- Opened: 3 August 1892
- Electrification: 3 June 1924

Technical
- Line length: 18.6 km (11.6 mi)
- Number of tracks: Mixture of single and double track
- Track gauge: 1,435 mm (4 ft 8 1/2 in) standard gauge
- Electrification: 15 kV 16.7 Hz AC supplied by overhead line

The Sihltal railway line (German: Sihltalbahn) is a railway line in the Swiss canton of Zürich, which connects the city of Zürich with the communities of the Sihl Valley. Passenger service on the line now forms part of the Zürich S-Bahn, branded as that network's service S4, and is part of the Zürcher Verkehrsverbund (ZVV) zone-based fare network.

The line was opened in 1892 and electrified in 1924. Today it is owned by the Sihltal Zürich Uetliberg Bahn SZU AG, a company that also owns the Uetliberg line, and organizes the Zimmerberg Bus, and operates the Luftseilbahn Adliswil-Felsenegg (LAF).

== History ==
The Sihltal line was built by the Sihltalbahn company (SiTB), which opened a line from Zürich Selnau to Sihlwald 3 August 1892. Selnau was already the terminus of the Uetliberg line, and the two lines ran in parallel as far as Giesshübel station. That December, a freight branch was constructed linking Giesshübel station with Wiedikon station on the Lake Zürich left bank line of the Swiss Northeastern Railway (NOB).

On 1 June 1897 the Sihltal line was extended to Sihlbrugg and a connection with the Thalwil–Arth-Goldau railway of the NOB. In 1924 the line was electrified using alternating current. In 1932 the management of the Sihltal line took over the management of the Uetliberg line, but the two companies remained in existence until 1973, when they were merged to form the SZU.

In 1990, the two lines were extended from their previous joint terminus at Bahnhof Selnau to a terminus at Zürich HB SZU, beneath Zürich Main Station. This extension involved the construction of a new rail tunnel from Selnau to HB, and a new underground intermediate station adjacent to the former terminus. The underground platform and tracks used at HB were already in existence, having been built prior to 1973 for a U-Bahn scheme that was ultimately rejected by voters. Once the new extension had been opened, the former terminus at Selnau was redeveloped and little evidence of it is now visible.

In 2006, the line was upgraded to allow a service every 10 minutes during peak periods. At the same time passenger services were withdrawn between Sihlwald and Sihlbrugg, although the track still exists and is used by occasional trains.

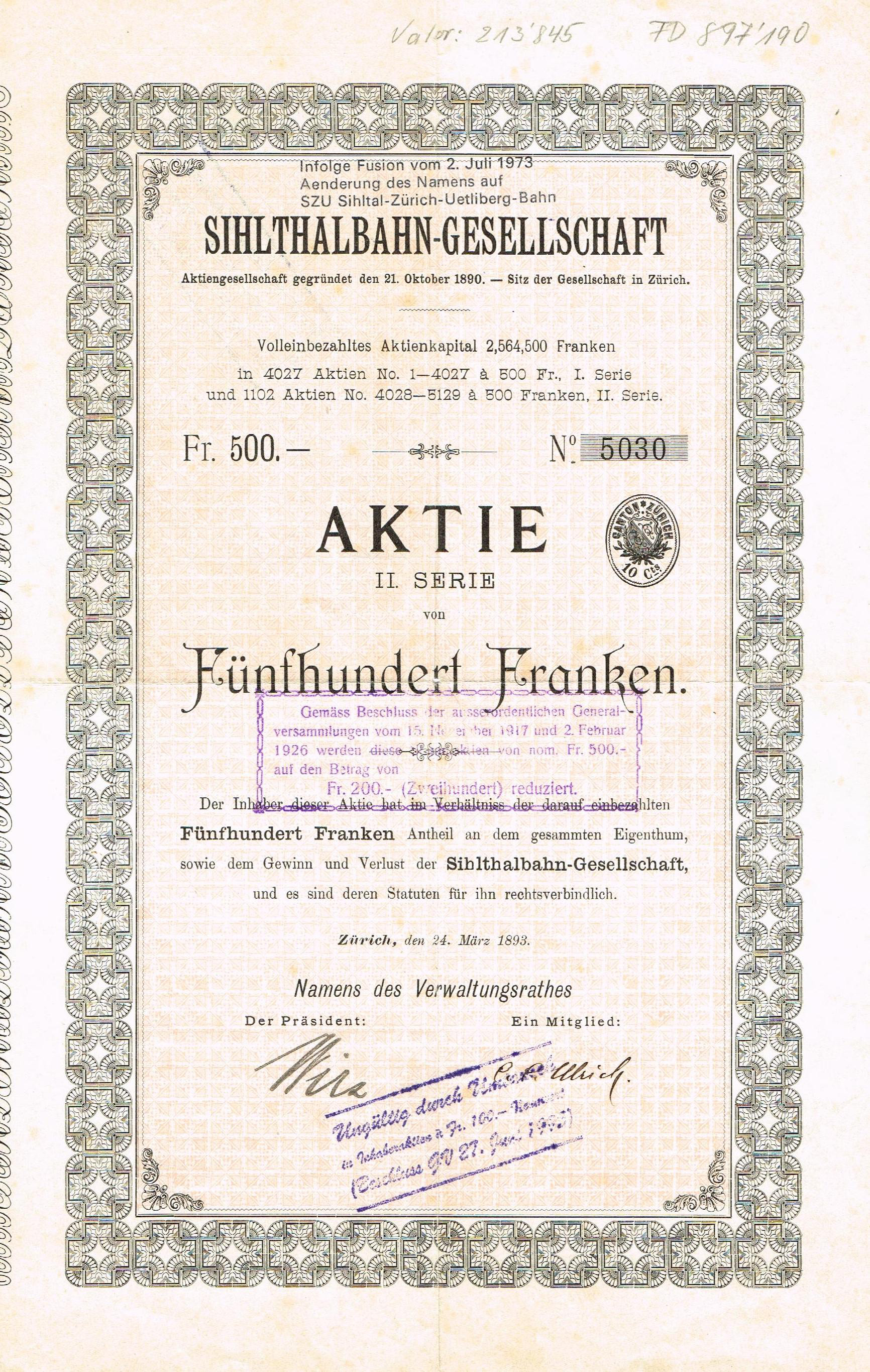
Share of the Sihlthalbahn-Gesellschaft, issued 24. March 1893

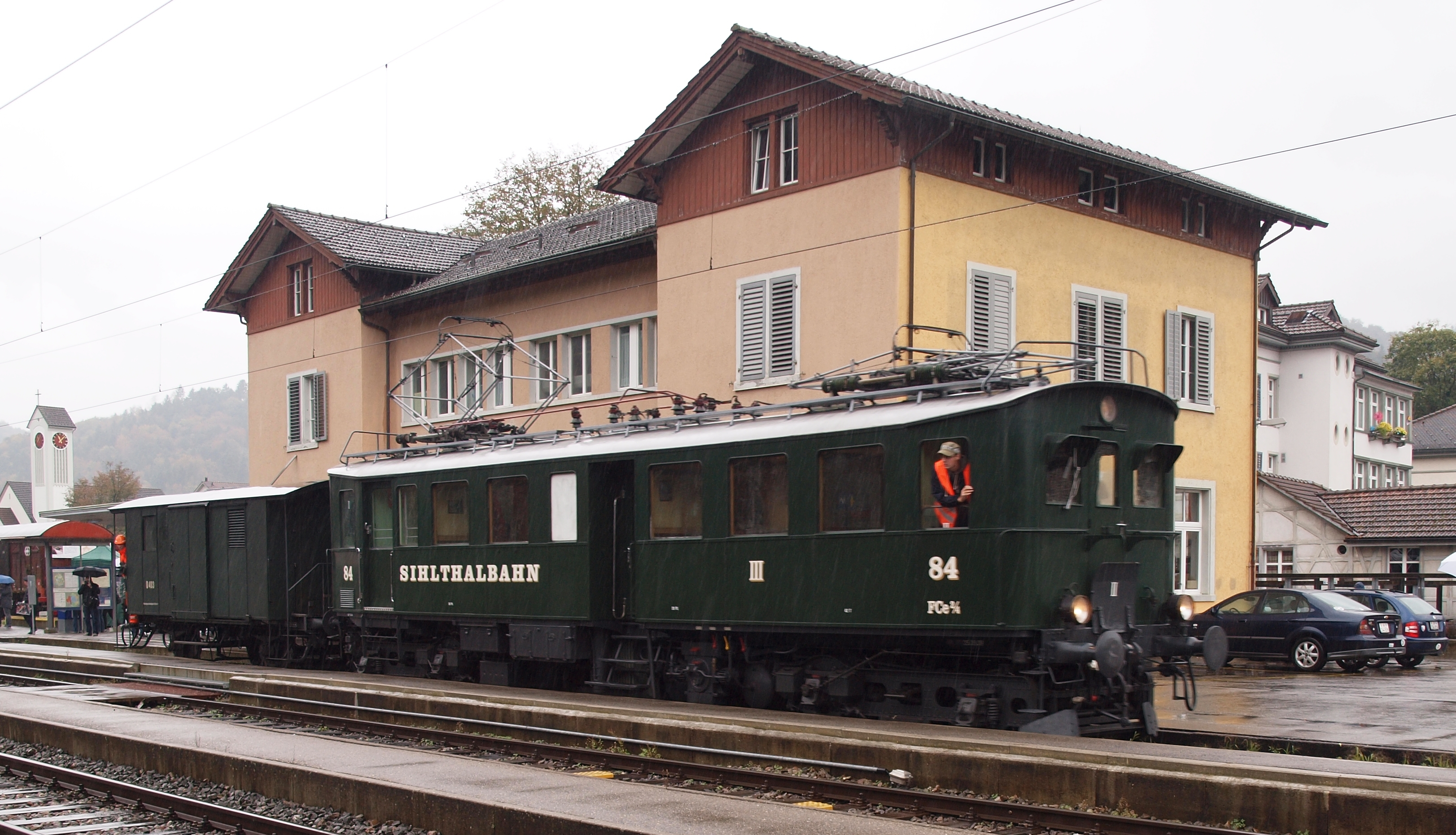
A 1924 railcar now preserved by the Zürcher Museums-Bahn

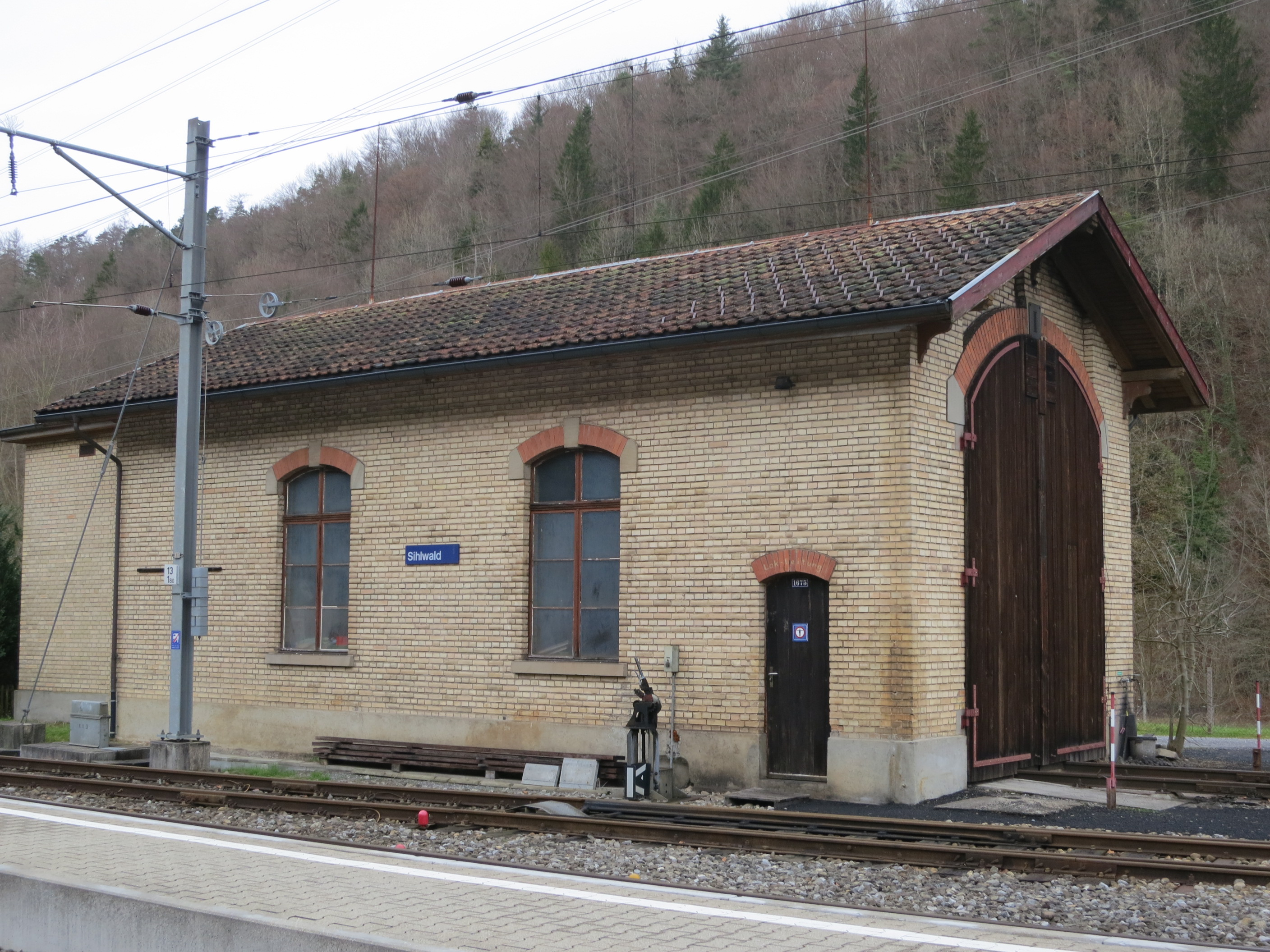
The 1897 locomotive shed at Sihlwald

== Operation (S4) ==
S4
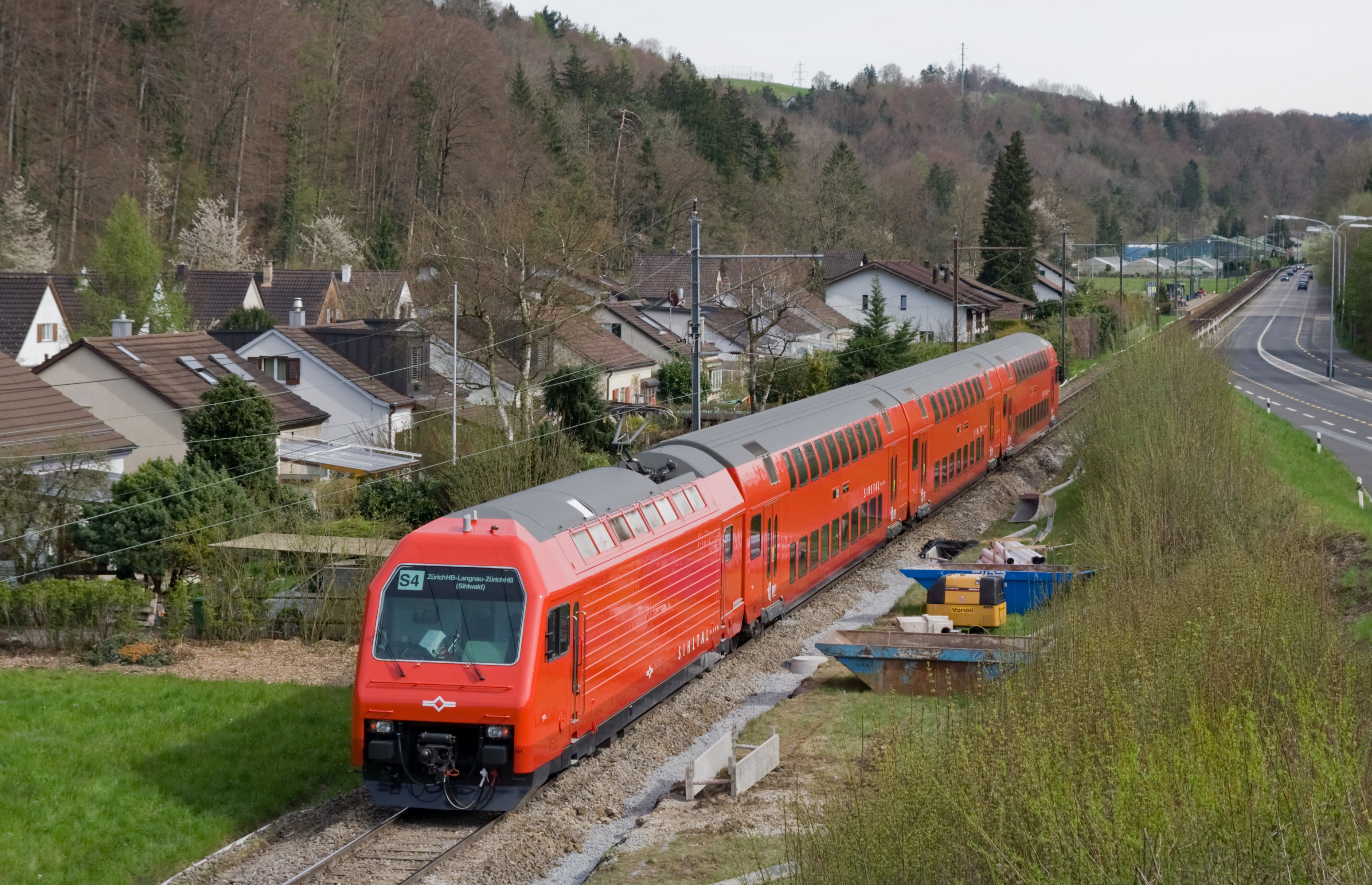
- S4 on the Sihltal line in the Sihl valley

Overview
- Service type: Zürich S-Bahn service
- Current operator: SZU

Route
- Termini: Zürich HB SZU; Sihlwald
- Stops: 11
- Service frequency: Every 20 minutes

Technical
- Rolling stock: Class 450 and 456 locomotives; Single- and double-decker coaches

=== Route ===
The Sihltal line shares a common terminus with the Uetliberg line, utilising a dedicated underground island platform (Zürich HB SZU) at Zürich Hauptbahnhof station. There is no rail connection to the rest of the station, but the platform is served by the same complex of pedestrian subways and subterranean shopping malls that link the station's other platforms.

From Hauptbahnhof to Zürich Giesshübel station the two lines share a common twin-track line, initially in tunnel, partly running along and under the Sihl river. The current Selnau station is located in this under-river tunnel section.

The two lines diverge at Giesshübel station, which is only served by trains on the Sihltal line. Also located here is a junction with the freight only branch to Zürich Wiedikon station on the Swiss Federal Railways' Lake Zürich left bank line. The next stop on the line is Zürich Saalsporthalle-Sihlcity station, which is adjacent to the large Sihlcity shopping mall, with direct access to the platforms from the mall. Further suburban stations follow at Zürich Brunau, Zürich Manegg and Zürich Leimbach.

Leaving the city of Zürich behind, the line closely follows the river Sihl, serving the stations of Sood-Oberleimbach, Adliswil and Sihlau in the municipality of Adliswil. At Adliswil, a short walk provides an interchange to the Adliswil-Felsenegg cable car, which rises to the summit of Felsenegg.

Beyond Adliswil, the stations of Wildpark-Höfli, Langnau-Gattikon and Sihlwald are served, although many trains terminate at Langnau-Gattikon. Beyond Sihlwald, the line continues to a junction with the Swiss Federal Railways' Thalwil–Arth-Goldau railway at Sihlbrugg station, although this section of line does not carry a regular passenger service.

=== Services ===
Zürich S-Bahn network as of December 2018

- S4 Zürich HB–Adliswil–Langnau-Gattikon (–Sihlwald)
  Hourly trains operate between Langnau-Gattikon and Sihlwald.

The passenger services on the line now forms part of the Zürich S-Bahn, branded as the S4. Trains usually run every 20 minutes outside peak periods, and every 10 minutes during peak periods. Most trains terminate at Langnau-Gattikon station, with only one train per hour continuing to Sihlwald station. Standard Zürcher Verkehrsverbund (ZVV) zonal fare tariffs apply to the line.

The night service (SN4) of the S4 line, operating on weekends after midnight, runs between Zürich Hauptbahnhof and Langnau-Gattikon.

The Zürcher Museums-Bahn (ZMB) operates occasional heritage railway services over the Sihltal line. On the last Sunday of every month from April to October, a steam service is operated from Zürich Wiedikon station to Sihlbrugg station. The ZMB preserves a selection of former Sihltal line rolling stock, including two early steam locomotives, and a railcar and a locomotive built for the original electrification.

=== Infrastructure ===
The Sihltal line is constructed to standard gauge and uses overhead lines for electrification. Both it and the Uetliberg line, with which it shares right-of-way between Zürich HB SZU and Zürich Giesshübel, are electrified at 15 kV AC.

Prior to August 2022 the Uetliberg line used 1200 V DC. To allow both lines to operate over the shared section, the Uetliberg line used an overhead line offset from the centre of the track, and its cars were equipped with specially designed pantographs to collect from this.

=== Rolling stock ===
Passenger services on the Sihltal line are operated with a mixture of single and double deck cars, sometimes with examples of both types in the same train. Traction is provided by electric locomotives, which operate their trains in push-pull mode with a driving car at the other end of the train. Six new multiple unit trains have been ordered to enter service in 2013, equipped for dual voltage operation so as to operate on both the Uetliberg and Sihltal lines.

As of 2019, service continues to be provided by Class 450 and 456 electric locomotives in push-pull operation, with 3–4 single- and double-decker coaches. Depending on the configuration, each train has between 351 and 448 seats.

== See also ==
- Rail transport in Switzerland
- List of railway stations in Zurich
- Public transport in Zurich
- ZVV fare zones
