= Zurich Manegg railway station =

Railway station in the Swiss city of Zürich

Zürich Manegg
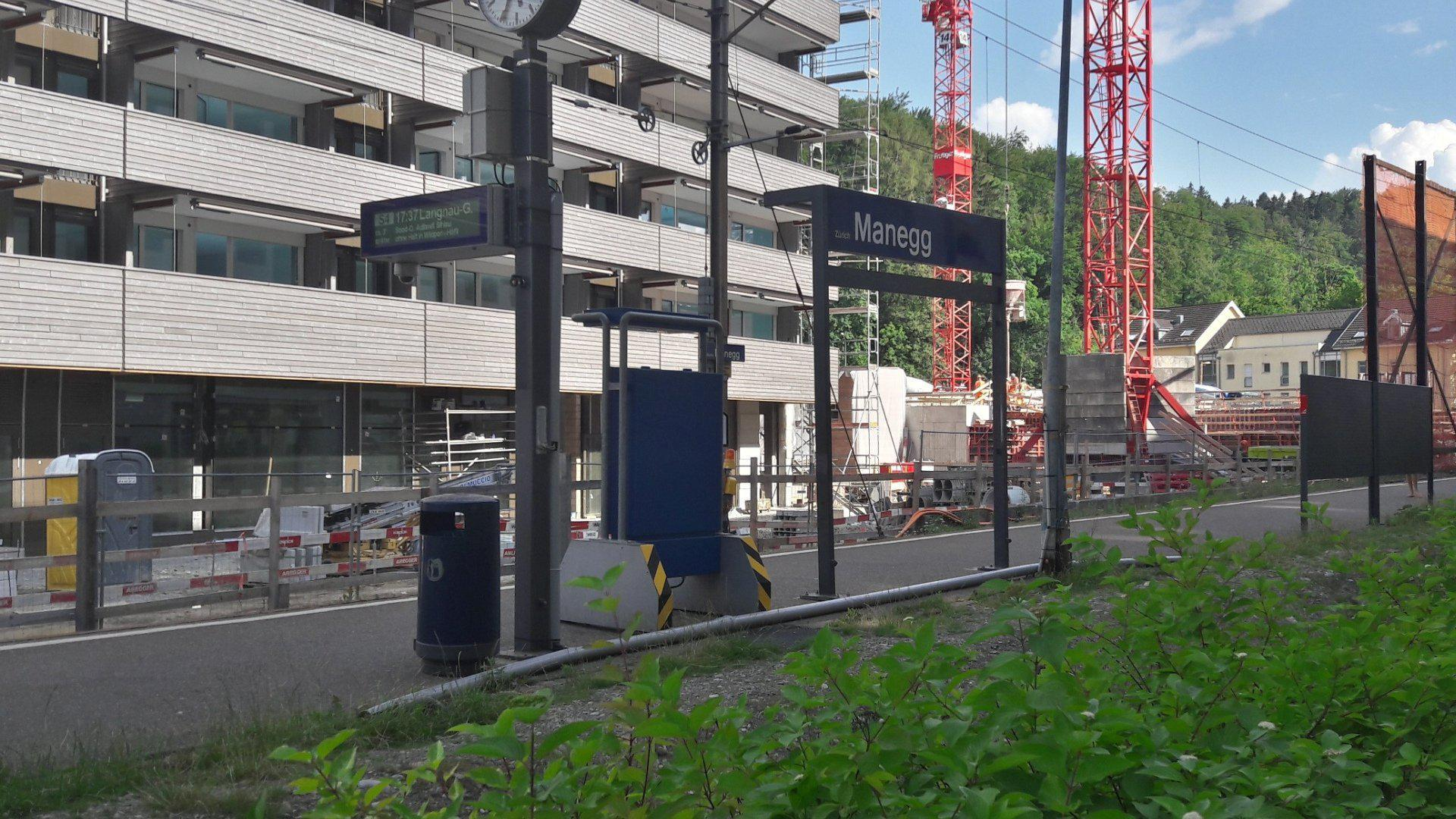
- The station platform in 2018

General information
- Location: Allmendstrasse, City of Zurich, Canton of Zurich, Switzerland
- Coordinates: 47.338216°N 8.519881°E
- Elevation: 431 m (1,414 ft)
- Owner: Sihltal Zürich Uetliberg Bahn
- Operator: Sihltal Zürich Uetliberg Bahn
- Line: Sihltal line
- Platforms: 1 side platform
- Connections: ZVV: Manegg
- Bus: VBZ bus line 70

Other information
- Fare zone: ZVV 110

Services
Preceding station	Zurich S-Bahn	Following station
Zürich Leimbach towards Sihlwald	S4	Zürich Brunau towards Zürich HB SZU
Zürich Leimbach towards Langnau-Gattikon	SN4 Limited service	Zürich Brunau towards Zürich HB SZU
Location

Zürich Manegg (German: Zürich Manegg) is a railway station in the Swiss city of Zurich. It is located within fare zone 110 of the Zürcher Verkehrsverbund (ZVV). The station is on the Sihltal line, which is owned and operated by the Sihltal Zürich Uetliberg Bahn (SZU).

== Services ==
The station is served by the following S-Bahn train services:

Operator	Train Type	Route	Typical Frequency	Notes
SZU	S4	Zürich HB - Zürich Selnau - Zürich Giesshübel - Zürich Saalsporthalle-Sihlcity - Zürich Brunau - Zürich Manegg - Zürich Leimbach - Sood-Oberleimbach - Adliswil - Sihlau - Wildpark-Höfli - Langnau-Gattikon - Sihlwald	3-6 trains per hour	Part of Zurich S-Bahn. 1 train per hour beyond Langnau-Gattikon
SZU	SN4	Zürich HB - Zürich Selnau - Zürich Giesshübel - Zürich Saalsporthalle-Sihlcity - Zürich Brunau - Zürich Manegg - Zürich Leimbach - Sood-Oberleimbach - Adliswil - Sihlau - Wildpark-Höfli - Langnau-Gattikon	Friday/Saturday late night/early morning (also in operation for special occasions)	Zurich S-Bahn nighttime service. Hourly arriving from 01:19-04:19 and departing from 01:47-03:47

== See also ==
- List of railway stations in Zurich
- Public transport in Zurich
