= Zurich Leimbach railway station =

Railway station in the Leimbach quarter of the Swiss city of Zürich

Zürich Leimbach
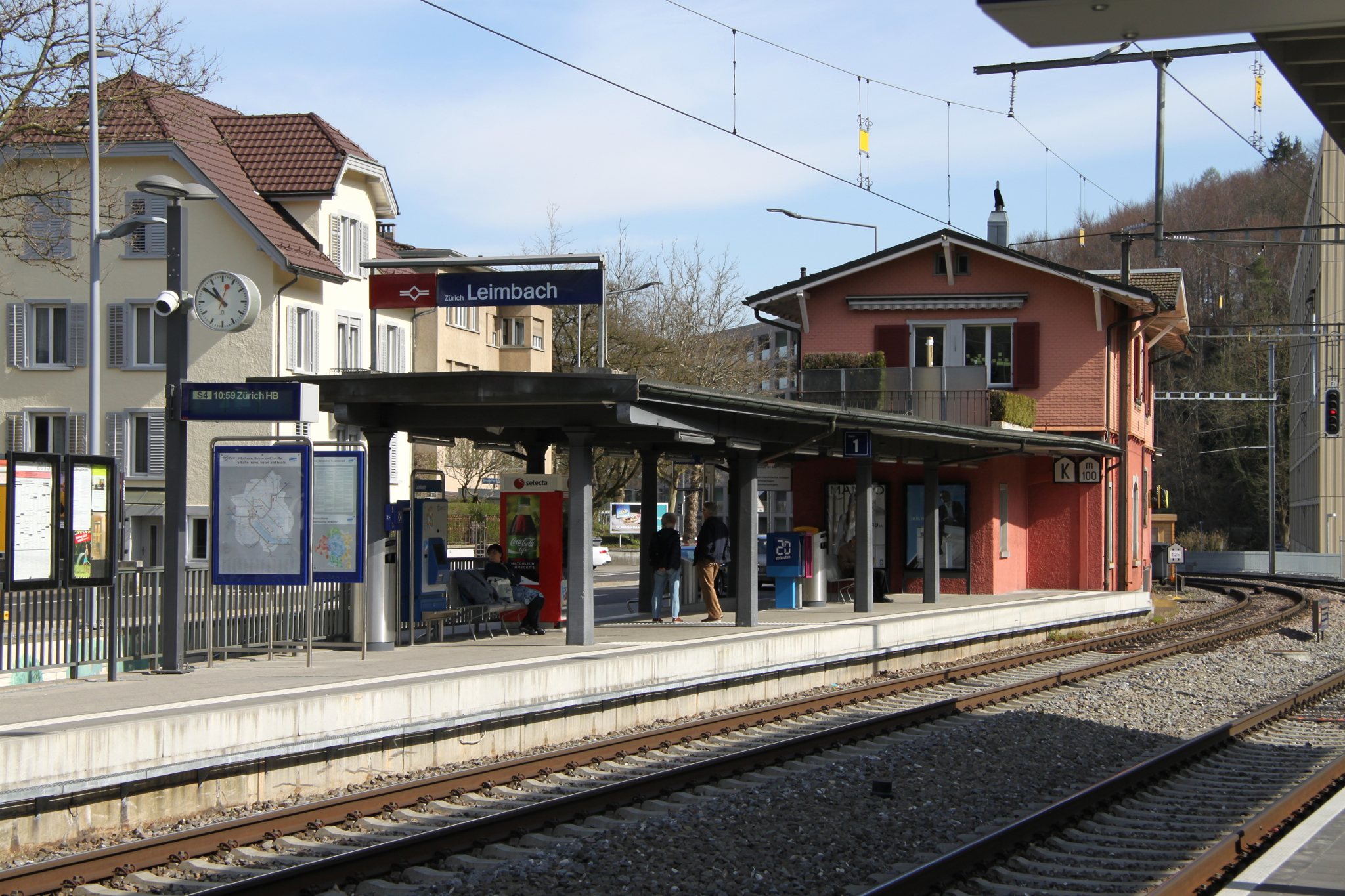

General information
- Location: Leimbachstrasse, City of Zurich, Canton of Zurich, Switzerland
- Coordinates: 47.3336°N 8.5191°E
- Elevation: 435 m (1,427 ft)
- Owner: Sihltal Zürich Uetliberg Bahn
- Operator: Sihltal Zürich Uetliberg Bahn
- Line: Sihltal line
- Platforms: 2 side platforms
- Connections: ZVV: Zürich Leimbach, Bahnhof
- Bus: VBZ bus line 70

Other information
- Fare zone: ZVV 110

Services
Preceding station	Zurich S-Bahn	Following station
Sood-Oberleimbach towards Sihlwald	S4	Zürich Manegg towards Zürich HB SZU
Sood-Oberleimbach towards Langnau-Gattikon	SN4 Limited service	Zürich Manegg towards Zürich HB SZU
Location

Zürich Leimbach (German: Zürich Leimbach) is a railway station in the south-west of the Swiss city of Zurich, in the Leimbach quarter. It is located within fare zone 110 of the Zürcher Verkehrsverbund (ZVV). The station is on the Sihltal line, which is owned and operated by the Sihltal Zürich Uetliberg Bahn (SZU).

== Services ==
The station is served by the following S-Bahn trains:

Operator	Train Type	Route	Typical Frequency	Notes
SZU	S4	Zürich HB - Zürich Selnau - Zürich Giesshübel - Zürich Saalsporthalle-Sihlcity - Zürich Brunau - Zürich Manegg - Zürich Leimbach - Sood-Oberleimbach - Adliswil - Sihlau - Wildpark-Höfli - Langnau-Gattikon - Sihlwald	3-6 trains per hour	Part of Zurich S-Bahn. 1 train per hour beyond Langnau-Gattikon
SZU	SN4	Zürich HB - Zürich Selnau - Zürich Giesshübel - Zürich Saalsporthalle-Sihlcity - Zürich Brunau - Zürich Manegg - Zürich Leimbach - Sood-Oberleimbach - Adliswil - Sihlau - Wildpark-Höfli - Langnau-Gattikon	Friday/Saturday late night/early morning (also in operation for special occasions)	Zurich S-Bahn nighttime service. Hourly arriving from 01:20-04:20 and departing from 01:46-03:46

== See also ==
- List of railway stations in Zurich
- Public transport in Zurich
