= Zurich Giesshübel railway station =

Railway station in the west of the Swiss city of Zurich, on the Sihltal line

Zürich Giesshübel
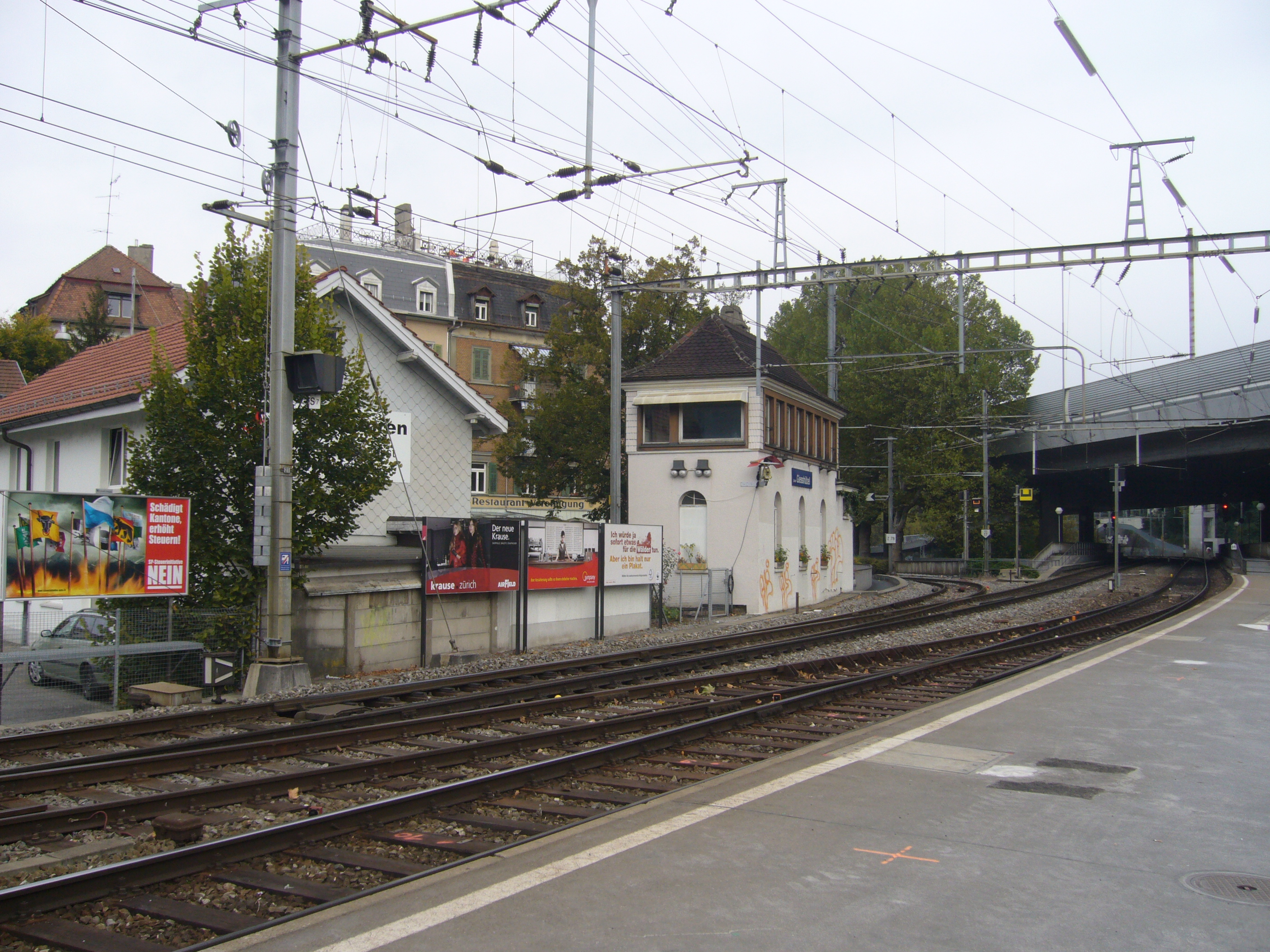

General information
- Location: Giesshübel, City of Zurich, Canton of Zurich, Switzerland
- Coordinates: 47.362152°N 8.52134°E
- Elevation: 418 m (1,371 ft)
- Owner: Sihltal Zürich Uetliberg Bahn
- Operator: Sihltal Zürich Uetliberg Bahn
- Line: Sihltal line
- Platforms: 1 side platform

Other information
- Fare zone: ZVV 110

Services
Preceding station	Zurich S-Bahn	Following station
Zürich Saalsporthalle towards Sihlwald	S4	Zürich Selnau towards Zürich HB SZU
Zürich Saalsporthalle towards Langnau-Gattikon	SN4 Limited service	Zürich Selnau towards Zürich HB SZU
Location

Zürich Giesshübel (German: Zürich Giesshübel) is a railway station in the west of the Swiss city of Zurich, in the city's Alt-Wiedikon quarter. It is located within fare zone 110 of the Zürcher Verkehrsverbund (ZVV). The station is on the Sihltal line which is operated by the Sihltal Zürich Uetliberg Bahn (SZU). Trains on the same company's Uetliberg line pass by the station without stopping, instead serving the nearby Zürich Binz station.

== Services ==
The station is served by the following S-Bahn train services (the S10 does not call at Zürich Giesshübel):

Operator	Train Type	Route	Typical Frequency	Notes
SZU	S4	Zürich HB - Zürich Selnau - Zürich Giesshübel - Zürich Saalsporthalle-Sihlcity - Zürich Brunau - Zürich Manegg - Zürich Leimbach - Sood-Oberleimbach - Adliswil - Sihlau - Wildpark-Höfli - Langnau-Gattikon - Sihlwald	3-6 trains per hour	Part of Zurich S-Bahn. 1 train per hour beyond Langnau-Gattikon
SZU	SN4	Zürich HB - Zürich Selnau - Zürich Giesshübel - Zürich Saalsporthalle-Sihlcity - Zürich Brunau - Zürich Manegg - Zürich Leimbach - Sood-Oberleimbach - Adliswil - Sihlau - Wildpark-Höfli - Langnau-Gattikon	Friday/Saturday late night/early morning (also in operation for special occasions)	Zurich S-Bahn nighttime service. Hourly arriving from 01:13-04:13 and departing from 01:53-03:53

== See also ==
- List of railway stations in Zurich
- Public transport in Zurich
