= Zürcher Museums-Bahn =

Heritage railway in Zurich, Switzerland

Coordinates: 47.26929652°N 8.55775856°E

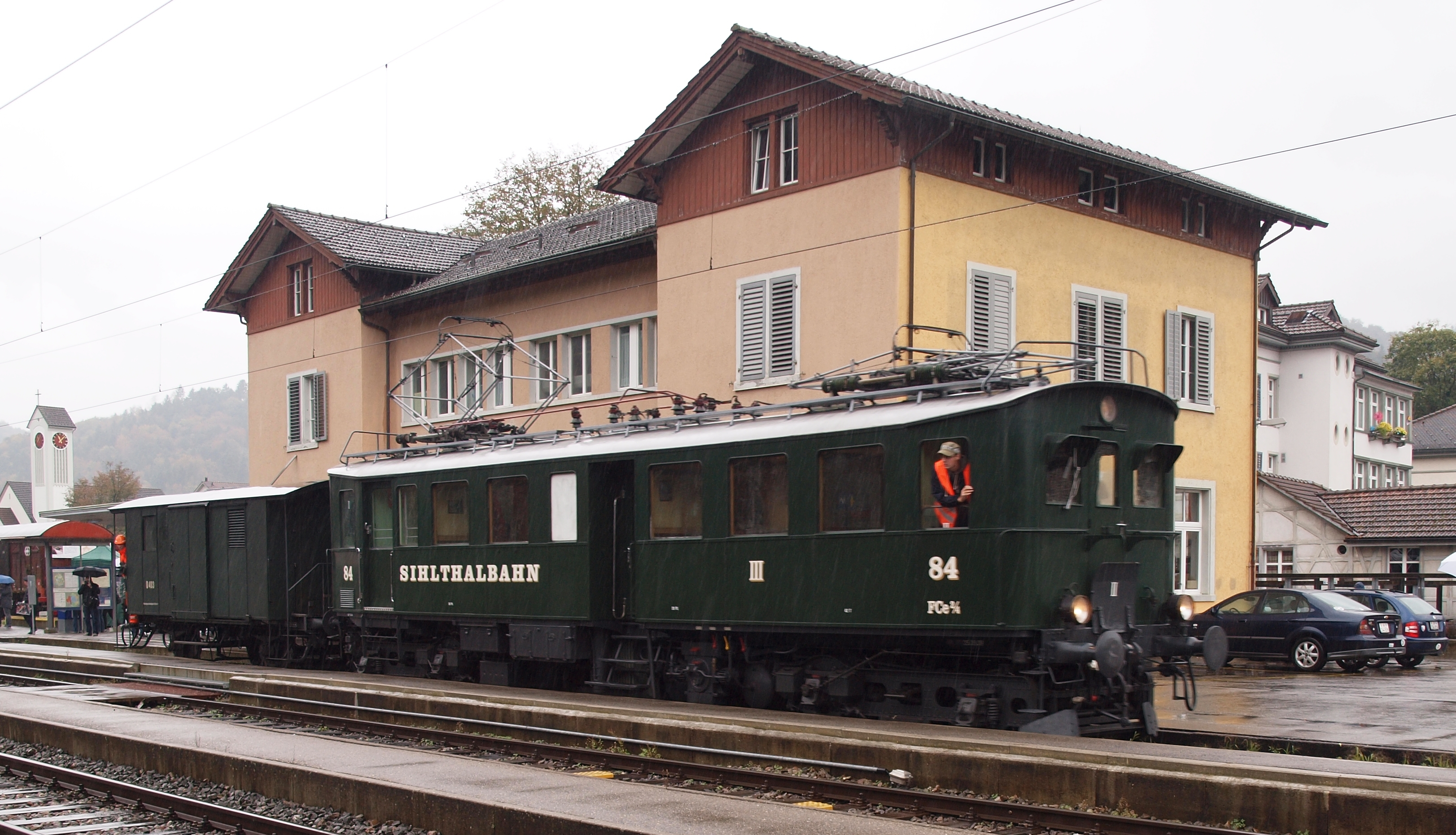
One of the railcars built for the electrification of the Sihltal line in 1924 and now preserved by the ZMB

The Zürcher Museums-Bahn (ZMB) is a heritage railway association based in the Swiss city of Zurich. It operates occasional services over the Sihltal line of the Sihltal Zürich Uetliberg Bahn, and preserves rolling stock, much of which formerly belonged to that operator.

On the last Sunday of every month from April to October, a steam service is operated from Zurich Wiedikon station to Sihlbrugg station. The ZMB preserves a selection of former Sihltal line rolling stock, including two early steam locomotives, and a railcar and a locomotive built for the original electrification.

== See also ==
- List of heritage railways and funiculars in Switzerland
