= Zurich Selnau railway station =

Underground railway station in the centre of the Swiss city of Zürich

Zürich Selnau
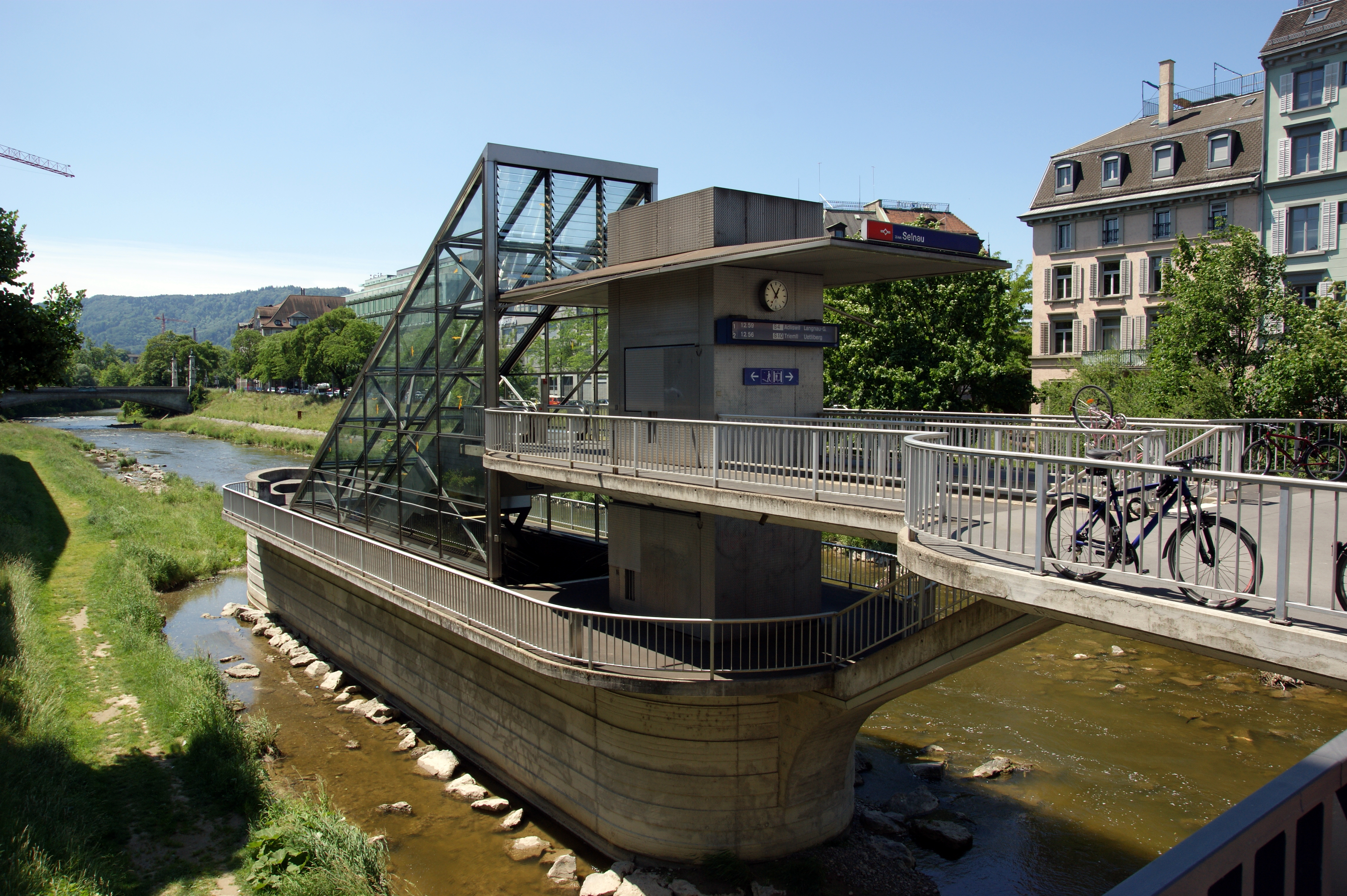
- Northern access to the station in the river Sihl

General information
- Location: Selnau, City of Zürich, Canton of Zürich, Switzerland
- Coordinates: 47.3729°N 8.5321°E
- Elevation: 398 m (1,306 ft)
- Owner: Sihltal Zürich Uetliberg Bahn
- Operator: Sihltal Zürich Uetliberg Bahn
- Line: Uetliberg line Sihltal line
- Platforms: 1 island platform
- Connections: ZVV: Bhf. Selnau
- Tram: VBZ tram 8

Other information
- Fare zone: ZVV 110

Services
Preceding station	Zurich S-Bahn	Following station
Zürich Giesshübel towards Sihlwald	S4	Zürich Hauptbahnhof towards Zürich HB SZU
Zürich Binz towards Uetliberg	S10	Zürich Hauptbahnhof towards Zürich HB SZU
Zürich Giesshübel towards Langnau-Gattikon	SN4 Limited service	Zürich Hauptbahnhof towards Zürich HB SZU
Location

Zurich Selnau (German: Zürich Selnau or Bahnhof Selnau) is an underground railway station on the Zurich S-Bahn system in Selnau in the centre of the Swiss city of Zurich, within fare zone 110 of the Zürcher Verkehrsverbund (ZVV). The station is on a section of tunnel under the river Sihl, common to the Uetliberg and Sihltal railway lines. Before the opening of this tunnel in 1990, the station was the surface-level terminus of these lines.

Only S-Bahn services call at Selnau station, which are operated by the Sihltal Zürich Uetliberg Bahn (SZU).

== Layout ==
The underground station has two tracks, served by a central platform. The platform has access to the streets at each end, with the northern access emerging through an unusual mid-river structure within the river Sihl.

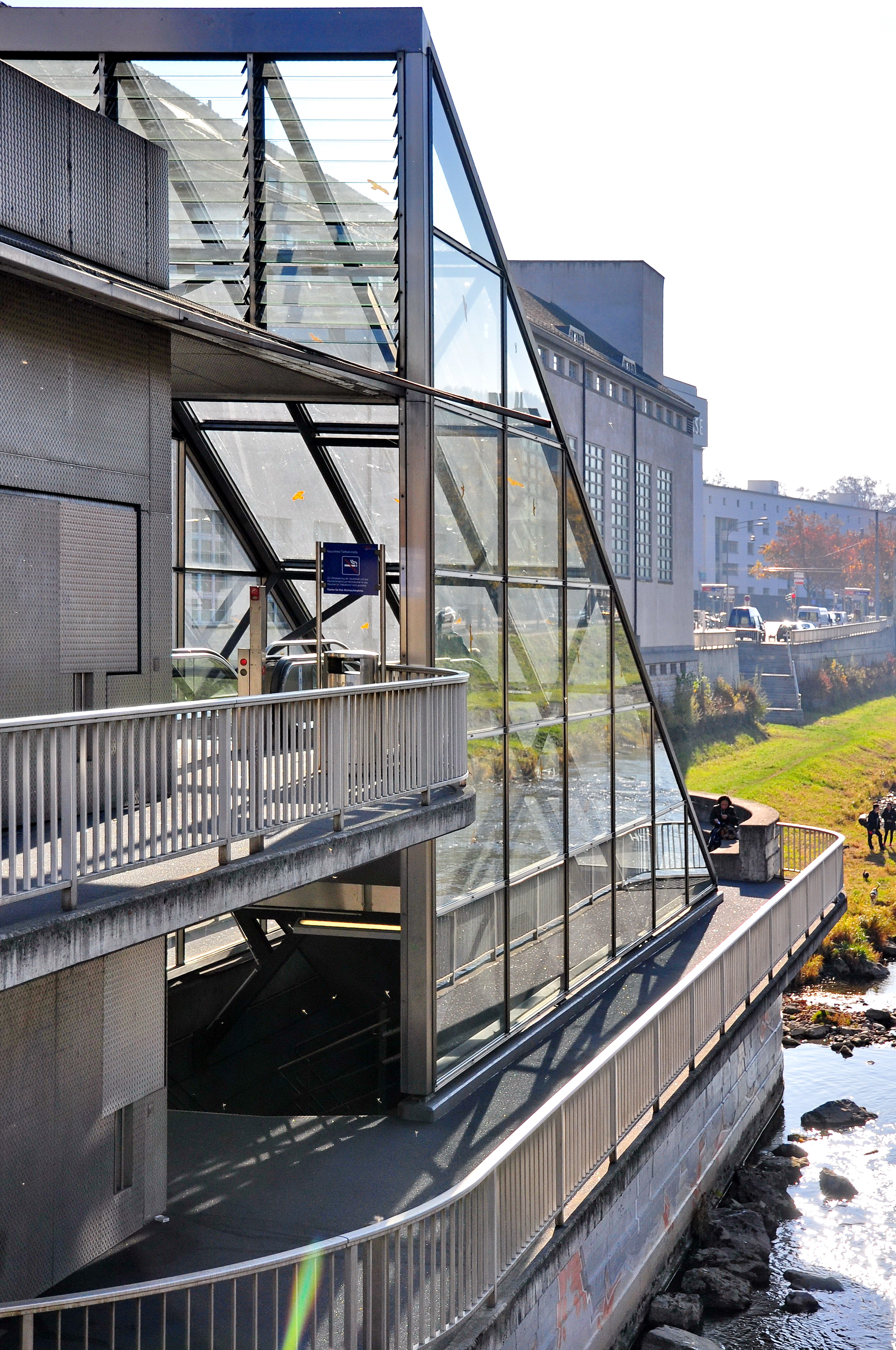
The station seen from street level

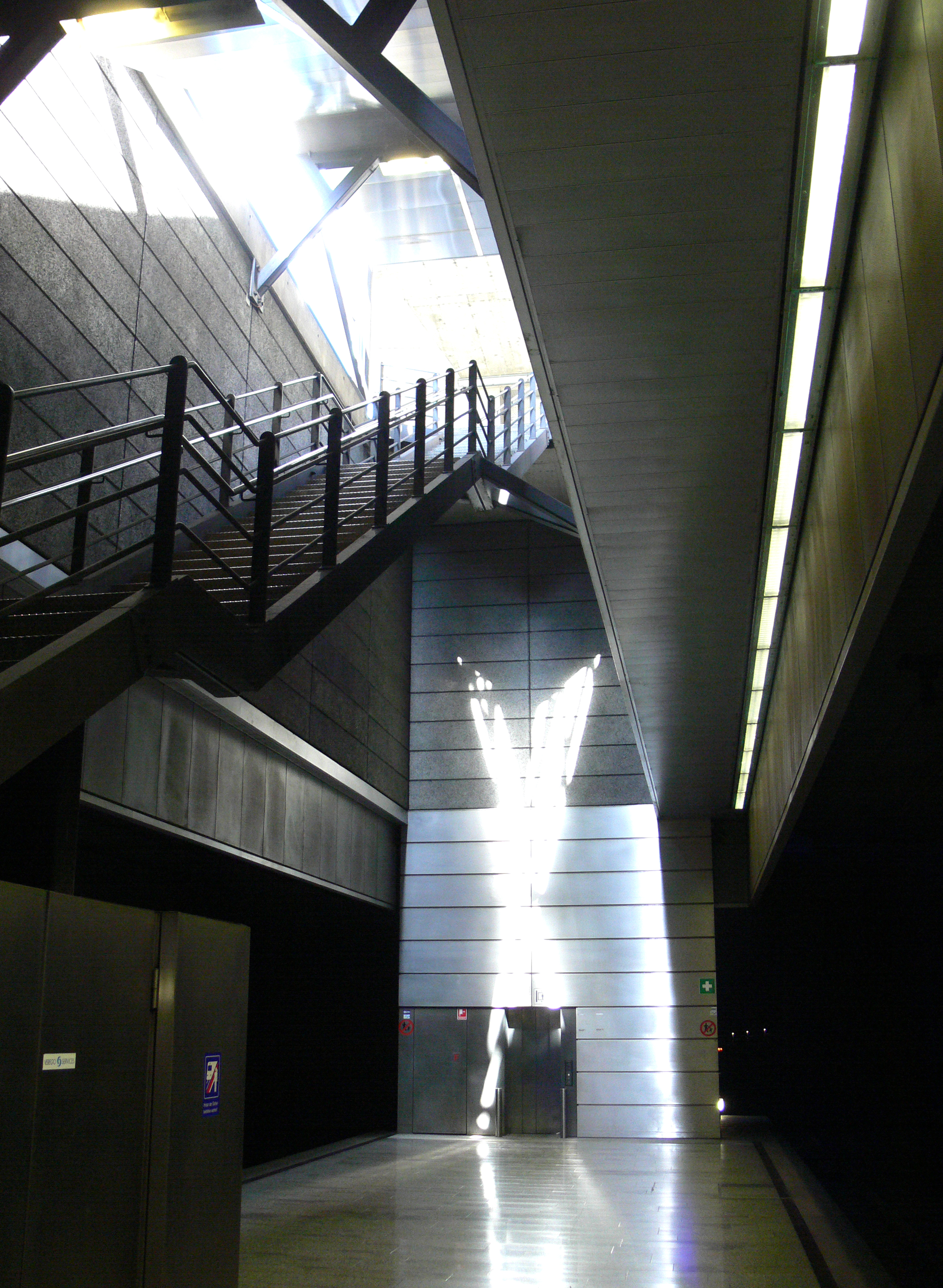
The station seen from platform level

== Service ==
=== S-Bahn ===
The station is served by the following train services of Zurich S-Bahn:

Operator	Train Type	Route	Typical Frequency	Notes
SZU	S4	Zürich HB SZU – Zürich Selnau – Zürich Giesshübel – Zürich Saalsporthalle-Sihlcity – Zürich Brunau – Zürich Manegg – Zürich Leimbach – Sood-Oberleimbach – Adliswil – Sihlau – Wildpark-Höfli – Langnau-Gattikon – Sihlwald	3–6 trains per hour	1 train per hour beyond Langnau-Gattikon
SZU	SN4	Zürich HB SZU – Zürich Selnau – Zürich Giesshübel – Zürich Saalsporthalle-Sihlcity – Zürich Brunau – Zürich Manegg – Zürich Leimbach – Sood-Oberleimbach – Adliswil – Sihlau – Wildpark-Höfli – Langnau-Gattikon	Friday/Saturday late night/early morning (also in operation for special occasions)	Hourly arriving from 01:11–04:11 and departing from 01:55–03:55
SZU	S10	Zürich HB SZU - Zürich Selnau - Zürich Binz – Zürich Friesenberg – Zürich Schweighof – Zürich Triemli – Uitikon Waldegg – Ringlikon – Uetliberg	3–6 trains per hour	Some trains terminate at Triemli

=== Tram ===
The railway station is connected to the Zurich tram network with its own tram stop, called Bhf. Selnau, located at the station's southern entrance. This tram stop lies on line 8. The station's northern entrance is situated in between tram stops Stauffacher (2, 3, 8, 9, 14) and Sihlstrasse (2, 9), both within walking distance.

== History ==
The original Bahnhof Selnau was an above-ground terminal station, serving as the Zurich city terminus of both the Uetliberg and Sihltal lines. It first opened in 1875 to serve the Uetliberg line, and was reached by the Sihltal line in 1892. In 1990, the two lines were extended to an underground terminus at Zürich Hauptbahnhof via a tunnel running under and along the Sihl river. The original cul-de-sac station Bahnhof Selnau, which was situated south of the tram stop Bhf. Selnau, was by-passed by this new line, and a new underground intermediate station was provided north of the former terminus. The original station was then redeveloped.

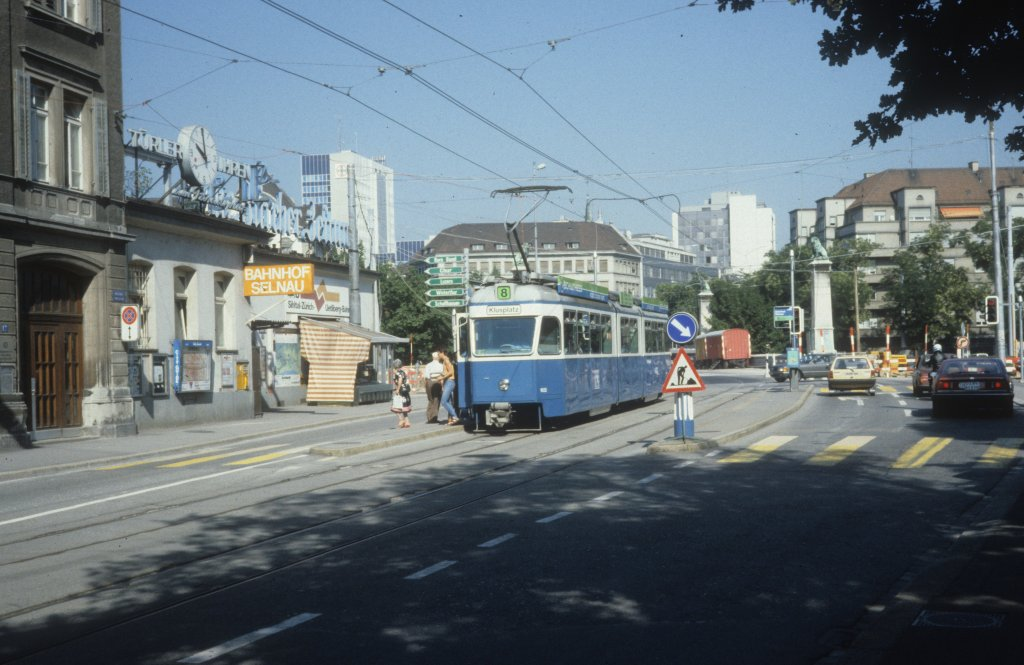
The street front of the original terminal station in 1986

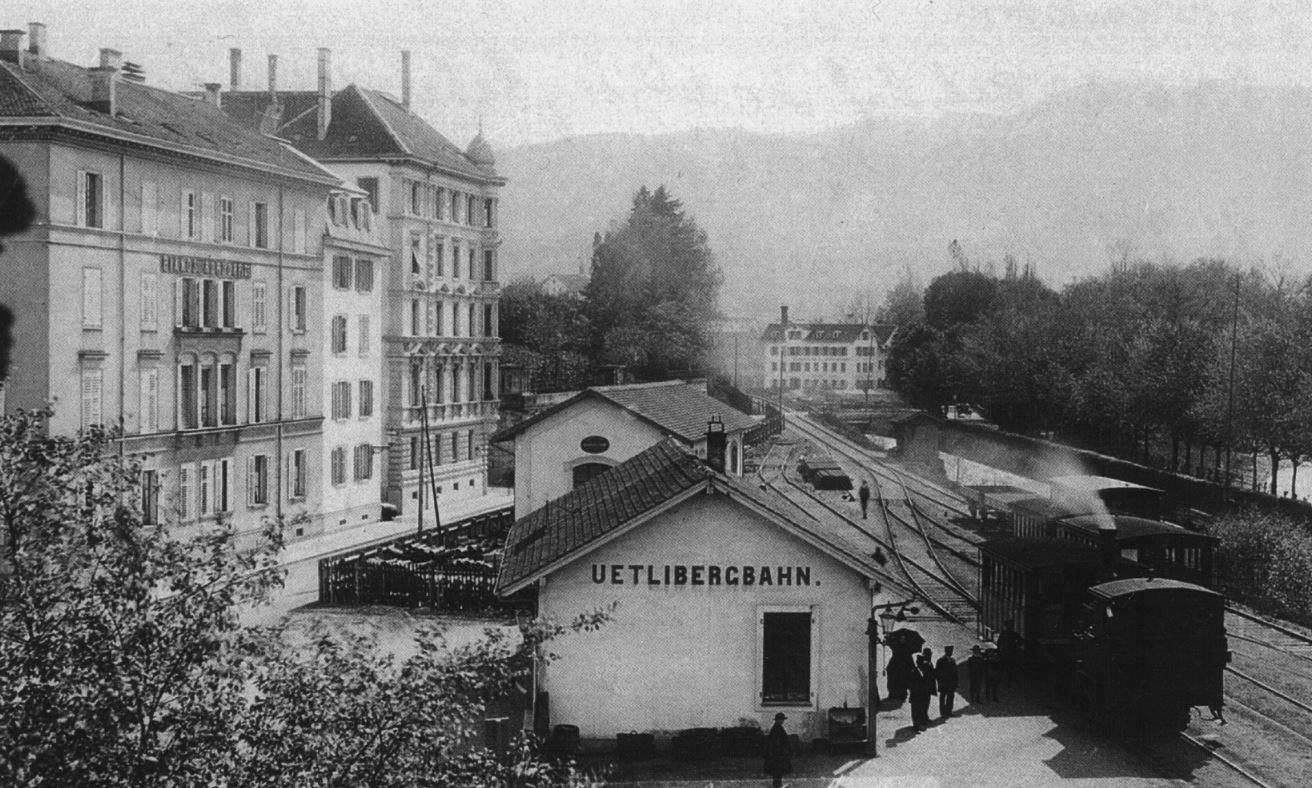
The former surface station in 1885

== See also ==
- List of railway stations in Zurich
- Public transport in Zurich
