= Zurich HB SZU railway station =

Train station in Switzerland

Zurich HB SZU
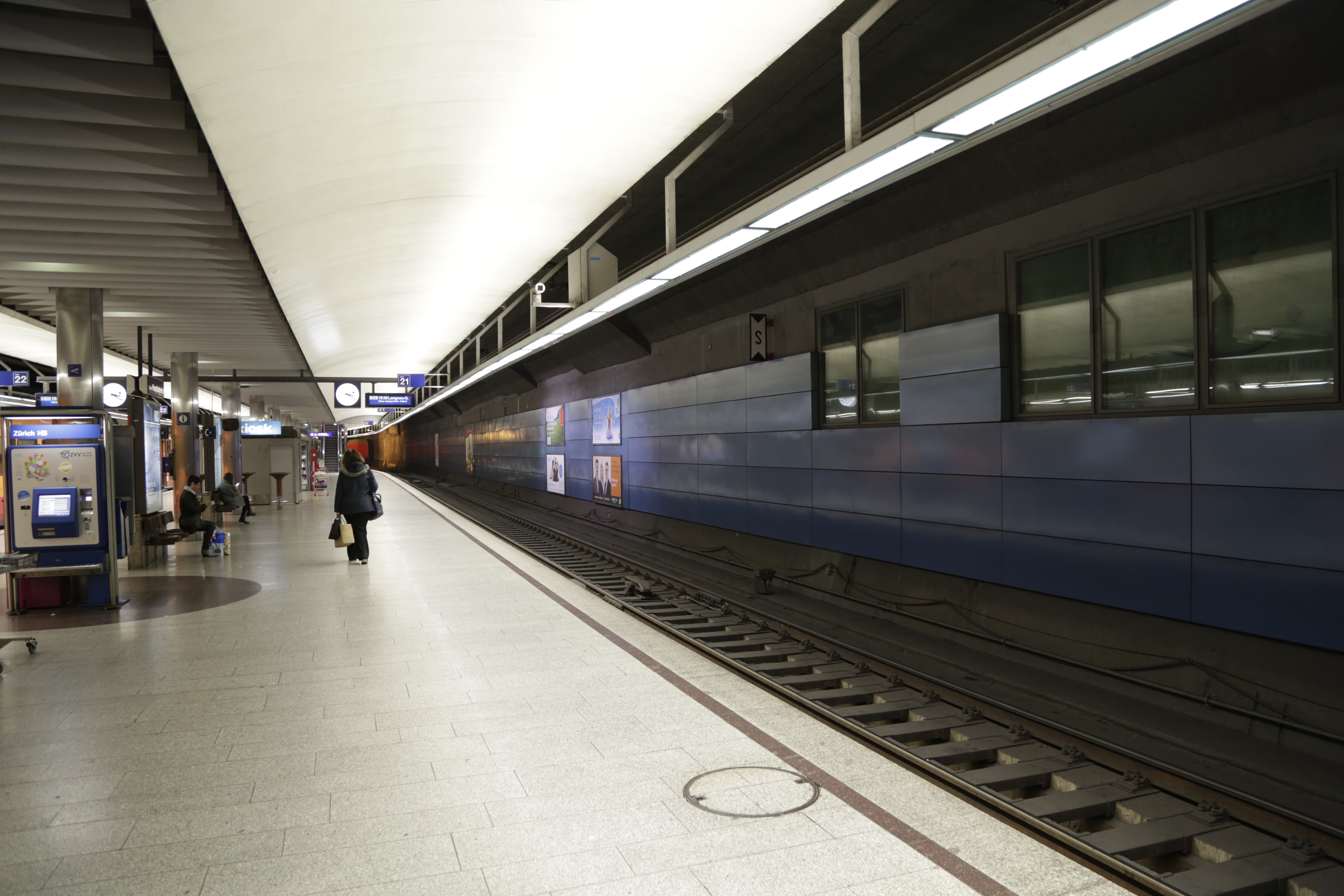
- The station platform in 2015

General information
- Location: Zurich; Canton of Zurich; Switzerland
- Coordinates: 47°22′37″N 8°32′20″E
- Elevation: 396 m (1,299 ft)
- Owner: SZU
- Operator: SZU
- Lines: Sihltal railway line; Uetliberg railway line
- Platforms: 1 island platform
- Tracks: 2
- Train operators: Sihltal Zürich Uetliberg Bahn
- Connections: Zürich Hauptbahnhof

Other information
- Fare zone: 110 (ZVV)

History
- Opened: 5 May 1990

Services
Preceding station	Zurich S-Bahn	Following station
Zürich Selnau towards Sihlwald	S4	Terminus
Zürich Selnau towards Uetliberg	S10	Terminus
Zürich Selnau towards Langnau-Gattikon	SN4 Limited service	Terminus
Location

Zurich HB SZU railway station (German: Bahnhof Zürich HB SZU) is a subsurface railway station situated below Bahnhofplatz in the city centre of Zurich, Switzerland. The station is physically connected to Zürich HB, Zurich Main Station, via the underground ShopVille mall. It is the terminus of the standard gauge Sihltal and Uetliberg railway lines of the Sihltal Zürich Uetliberg Bahn (SZU).

== Layout ==
The cul-de-sac station has a single Island platform. Its two tracks (Gleis), numbered 21 and 22, respectively, are not connected to any of the tracks of Zürich Hauptbahnhof, owned by Swiss Federal Railways (SBB CFF FFS).

== Services ==
=== S-Bahn ===
As of the December 2020 timetable change, the following S-Bahn services stop at Zürich HB SZU:

- Zurich S-Bahn:
  - S4: service every twenty minutes to Langnau-Gattikon; one train per hour continues to Sihlwald
  - S10: four trains per hour to Triemli; one train every half-hour continues to Uetliberg
  - SN4: hourly night-time service on Friday/Saturday to Langnau-Gattikon

=== Trams and buses ===
The station lies below Bahnhofplatz, which is served by trams and trolleybuses of the Verkehrsbetriebe Zürich (VBZ). Through, the undergrgound shopping mall ShopVille, the station is also connected to other stations adjacent to or nearby Zürich Hauptbahnhof (HB), namely:

- Bahnhofplatz/HB: tram lines 3, 6, 10, (Note: only deboarding) 14 and trolleybus 31
- Bahnhofquai/HB to the east via ShopVille: trolleybus 46
- Bahnhofstrasse/HB, south of Bahnhofplatz, via ShopVille: tram lines 4, 7, 10, 11, 13, and 15

The other nearby tram/bus stops Löwenplatz, Sihlpost/HB, Sihlquai/HB and Central can be reached via the streets.

== History ==
The station opened on 5 May 1990, following the completion of a new tunnel under the Sihl from the old terminus at Zürich Selnau (until then a surface station), for which an already built stretch of tunnel of the unrealized Zurich Underground Railway was repurposed.

== 2026 modernization and closure ==
From 26 April until 11 October 2026, the underground SZU station platforms (tracks 21 and 22) at Zürich HB were completely closed to all train traffic for a comprehensive 24-week modernization project. The extensive reconstruction included gutting the station interior, installing a completely modernized smoke extraction system, and raising the platform height to 55 cm to ensure barrier-free, level boarding in compliance with the Swiss Disability Discrimination Act (BehiG).

During this 6-month closure, all S4 and S10 train services were forced to terminate early at Zurich Selnau station. Due to inner-city traffic constraints, no replacement bus services were provided between Selnau and Zürich HB; passengers were instead directed to detour using local VBZ tram lines or proceed on foot to reach the main station.

== See also ==
- List of railway stations in Zurich
- Hirschengraben Tunnel
- Löwenstrasse station
