= Triemli =

Triemli may refer to:

- Triemli Hospital, a major hospital in the Swiss city of Zurich
- Triemli railway station, a railway station in the Swiss city of Zurich
