= Uetliberg (disambiguation) =

Uetliberg or Üetliberg may refer to:

- Uetliberg, a mountain near to the Swiss city of Zurich
- Uetliberg railway line, a suburban railway in the Swiss city of Zurich
- Uetliberg railway station, the upper terminal station of the S10 service of Zürich S-Bahn
- Uetliberg (ship, 1999), a passenger ship on Lake Zurich

== See also ==
- Uetliburg, a village in the municipality of Gommiswald in the Swiss canton of St. Gallen
- Uetliburg Castle, the ruins of which are located on Uetliberg
