= Binz railway station =

Binz railway station may refer to:

- Ostseebad Binz railway station, in the town of Binz, Mecklenburg-Vorpommern, Germany
- Zürich Binz railway station, in the city of Zürich, Switzerland
