= Uitikon =

- Municipality
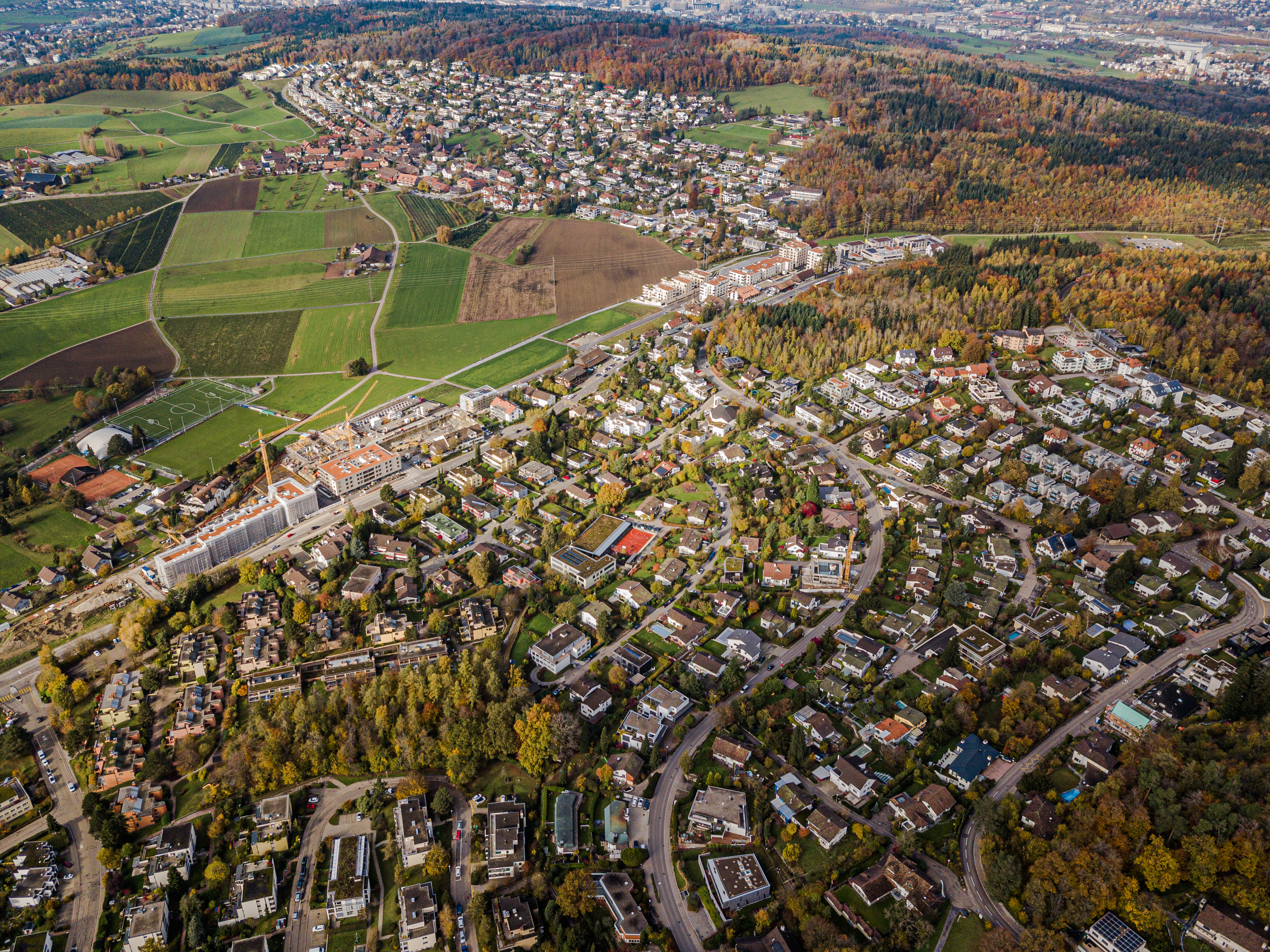

- Flag Coat of arms
- Location of Uitikon
- Location within Switzerland Location within Canton of Zurich
- Coordinates: 47°22′N 8°27′E
- Country: Switzerland
- Canton: Zurich
- District: Dietikon

Area
  - Total: 4.38 km^{2} (1.69 sq mi)
- Elevation: 550 m (1,800 ft)

Population (December 2020)
  - Total: 4,809
  - Density: 1,100/km^{2} (2,840/sq mi)
- Time zone: UTC+01:00 (CET)
  - Summer (DST): UTC+02:00 (CEST)
- Postal code: 8142
- SFOS number: 248
- ISO 3166 code: CH-ZH
- Localities: Uitikon, Waldegg, Ringlikon
- Surrounded by: Birmensdorf, Schlieren, Stallikon, Urdorf, Zurich
- Website: www.uitikon.ch

Uitikon is a village and municipality in the district of Dietikon in the canton of Zürich in Switzerland. Besides the village of Uitikon itself, the municipality includes the villages of Waldegg and Ringlikon.

== Geography ==
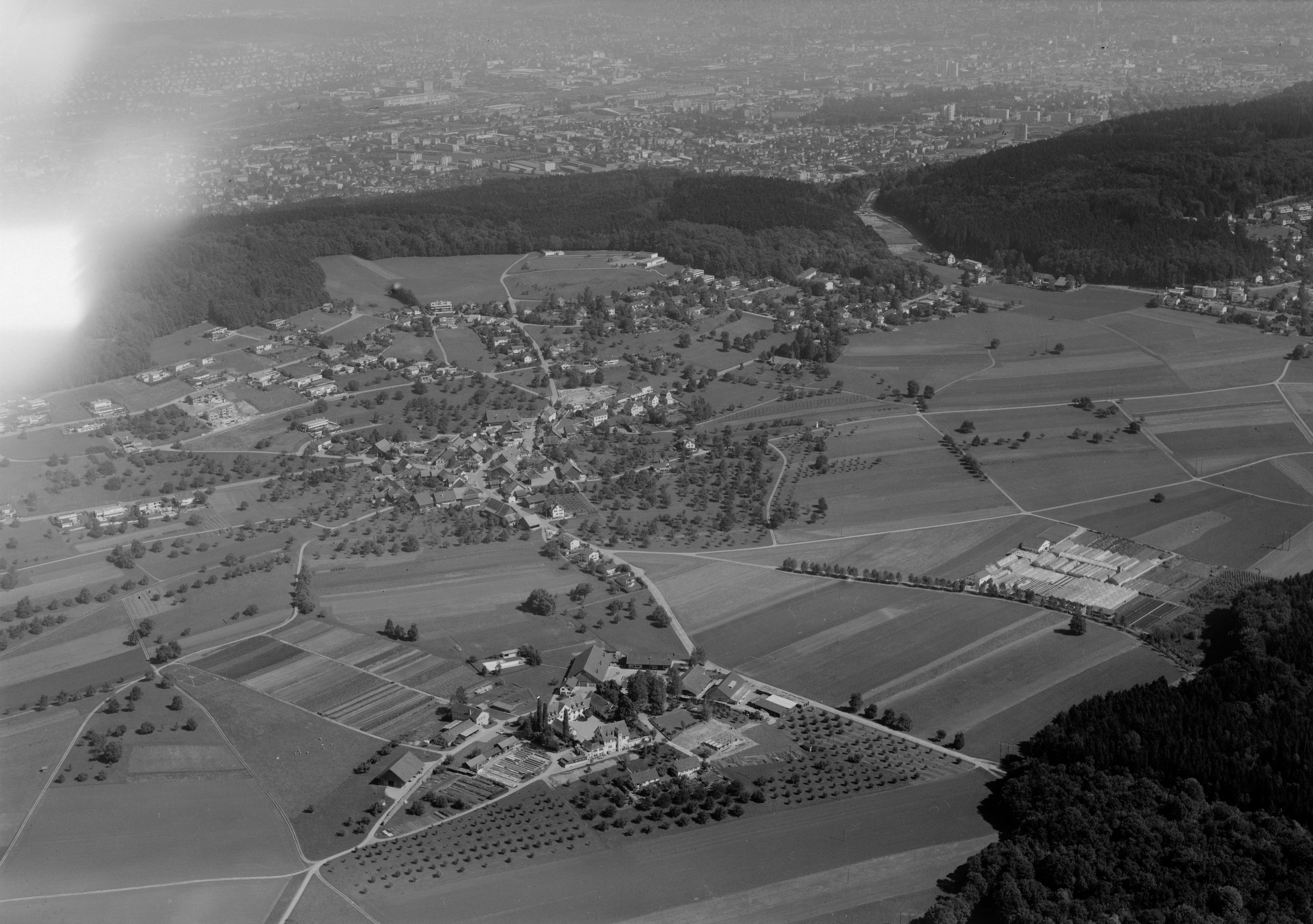
Aerial view (1966)

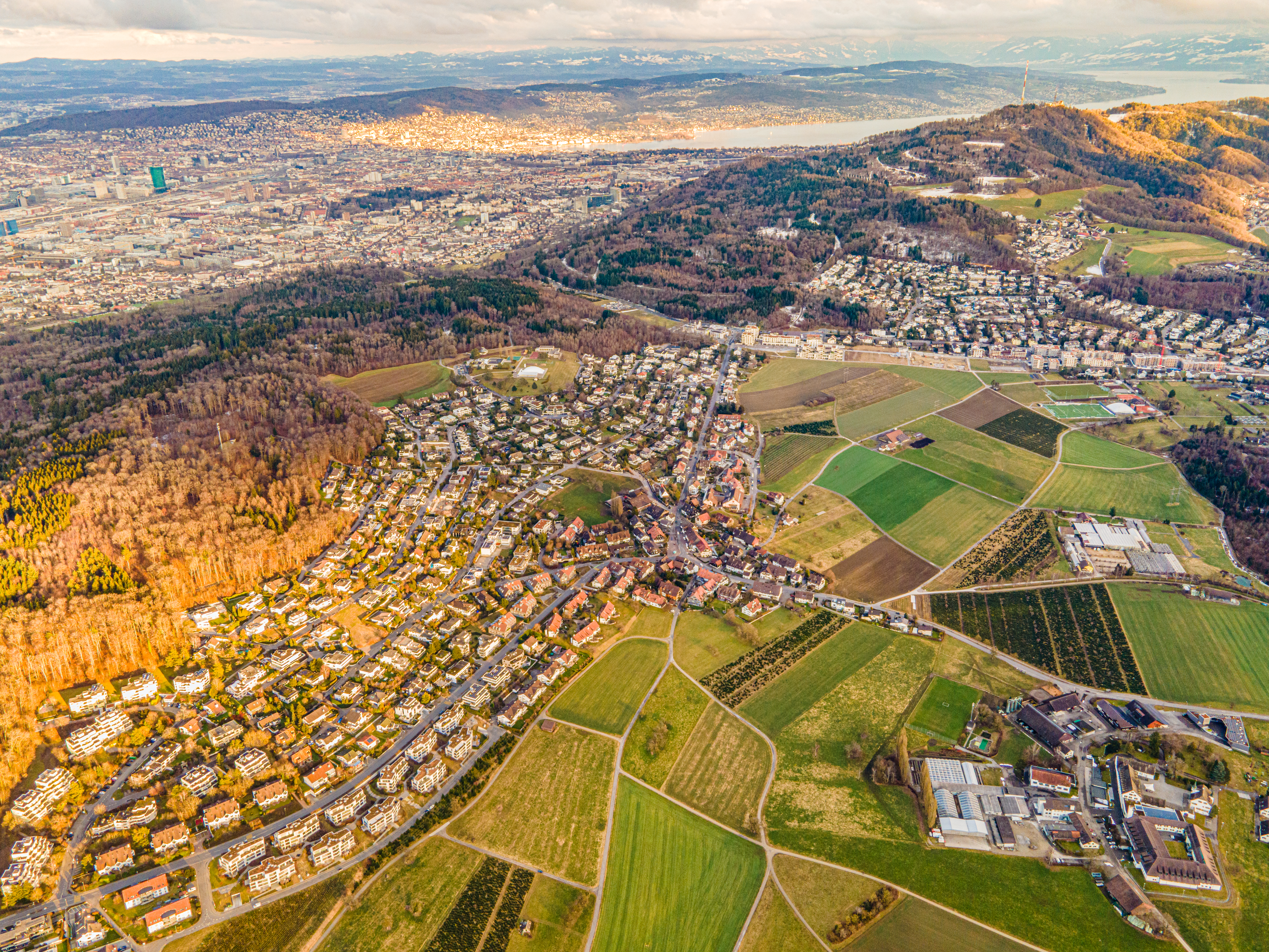
View of Uitikon from west. In front on the lower right is the centre for correctional measures, in the background the Uetliberg and the lake of Zurich.

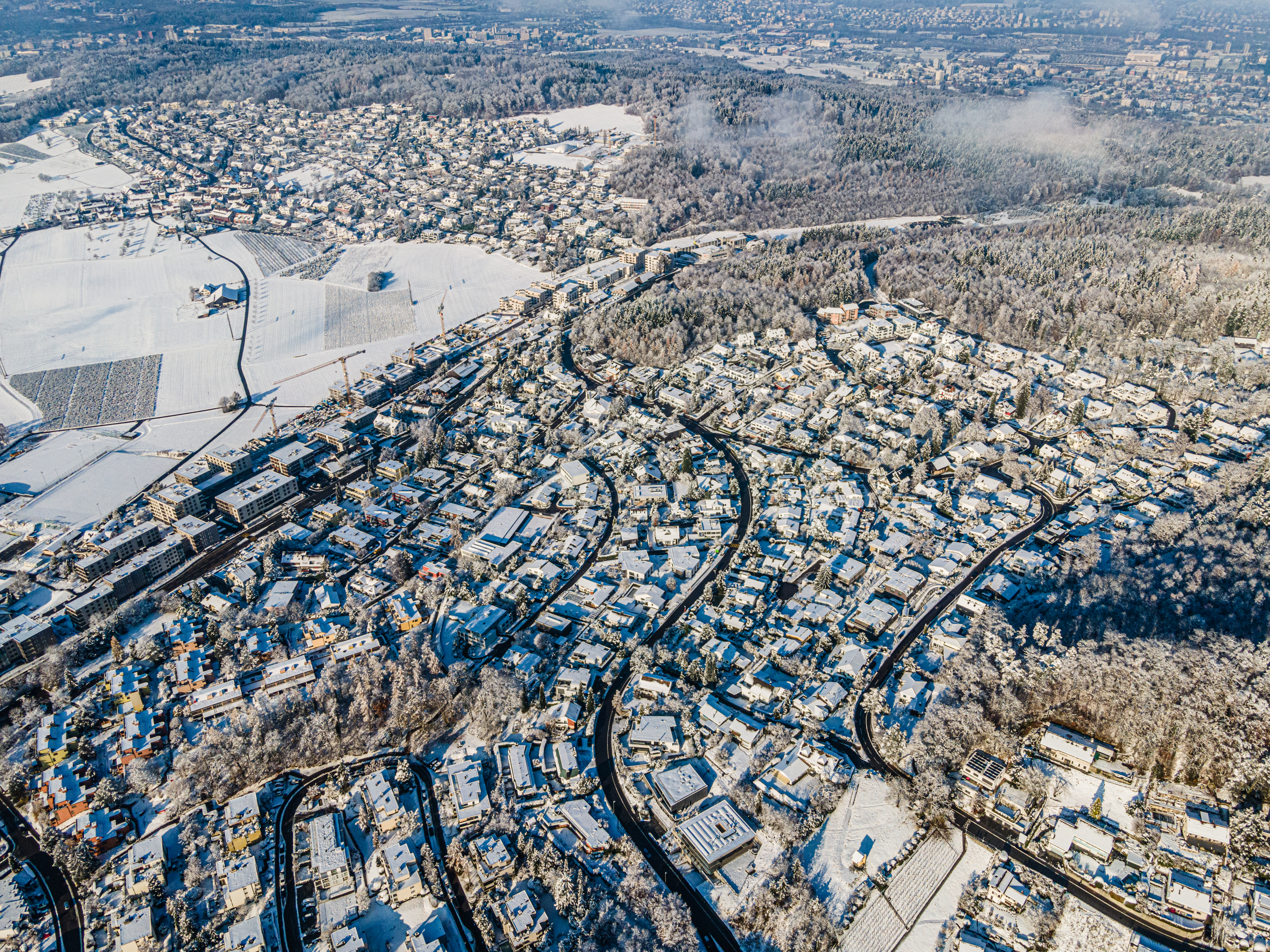
Uitikon during winter time

Uitikon lies on the northern end of the Albis hills that include the Uetliberg mountain and form the western boundary of the city of Zürich. The Uetliberg itself lies some 3 kilometres (1.9 mi) to the south-east, but its north-western flanks lie within the municipal boundary. The municipality is some 8 kilometres (5.0 mi) west of, and 150 metres (490 ft) higher than, Zürich city centre, and straddles the main road west from Zürich to Birmensdorf. The village of Uitikon lies to the north of the road, whilst Waldegg and Ringlikon lie to the south.

Uitikon has an area of 4.4 km^{2} (1.7 sq mi). Of this area, 38.8% is used for agricultural purposes, while 33.8% is forested. Of the rest of the land, 27.2% is settled (buildings or roads) and the remainder (0.2%) is non-productive (rivers, glaciers or mountains). In 1996 housing and buildings made up 22.1% of the total area, while transportation infrastructure made up the rest (5%). Of the total unproductive area, water (streams and lakes) made up 0% of the area. As of 2007 28.3% of the total municipal area was undergoing some type of construction.

== Demographics ==
Uitikon has a population (as of 31 December 2020) of 4,809. As of 2007, 11.9% of the population was made up of foreign nationals. As of 2008 the gender distribution of the population was 49.4% male and 50.6% female. Over the last 10 years the population has grown at a rate of 18%. Most of the population (as of 2000) speaks German (90.3%), with French being second most common ( 2.1%) and English being third ( 1.5%).

In the 2007 election the most popular party was the SVP which received 35.3% of the vote. The next three most popular parties were the FDP (28.8%), the SPS (9.7%) and the CVP (8.7%).

The age distribution of the population (as of 2000) is children and teenagers (0–19 years old) make up 19.5% of the population, while adults (20–64 years old) make up 61.5% and seniors (over 64 years old) make up 19%. In Uitikon about 89.6% of the population (between age 25-64) have completed either non-mandatory upper secondary education or additional higher education (either university or a Fachhochschule). There are 1569 households in Uitikon.

Uitikon has an unemployment rate of 1.51%. As of 2005, there were 55 people employed in the primary economic sector and about 13 businesses involved in this sector. 60 people are employed in the secondary sector and there are 13 businesses in this sector. 785 people are employed in the tertiary sector, with 154 businesses in this sector. As of 2007 65% of the working population were employed full-time, and 35% were employed part-time.

As of 2008 there were 1055 Catholics and 1607 Protestants in Uitikon. In the 2000 census, religion was broken down into several smaller categories. From the 2000 census, 47.2% were some type of Protestant, with 45.2% belonging to the Swiss Reformed Church and 2% belonging to other Protestant churches. 27.8% of the population were Catholic. Of the rest of the population, 0% were Muslim, 4.5% belonged to another religion (not listed), 2.3% did not give a religion, and 17.6% were atheist or agnostic.

== Transport ==
The main road west from Zürich to Birmensdorf passes through the municipality, and provides access to the A3 motorway, which passes to the west.

Uitikon Waldegg railway station, in the village of Waldegg, is a stop of the S-Bahn Zürich on the line S10. PostAuto bus route 201 links the villages of Uitikon, Waldegg and Ringlikon to each other and Waldegg station. Ringlikon village is also served by the nearby Ringlikon railway station, also on the S10.
