= Friesenberg =

District of the city of Zurich, Switzerland

- Quarter
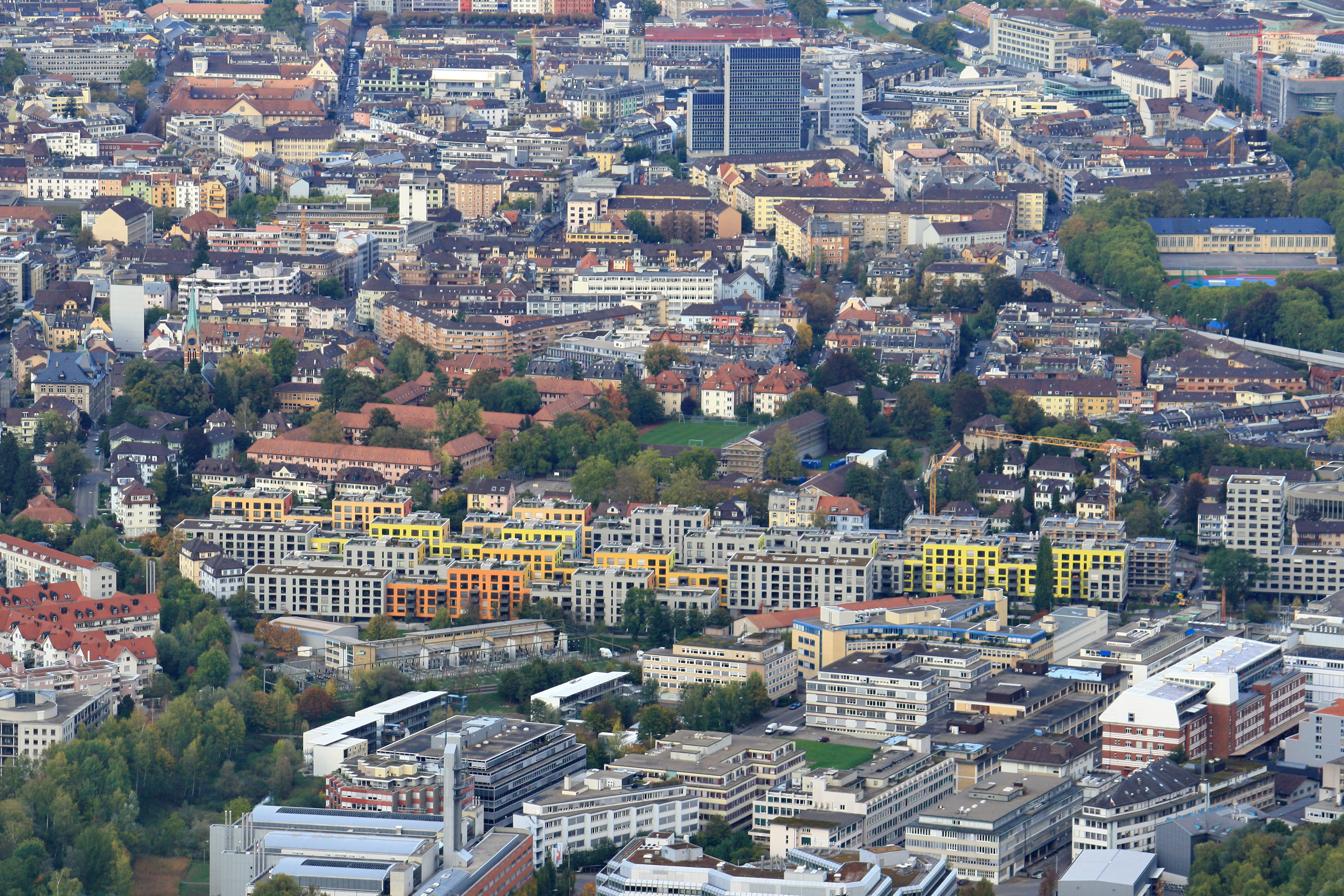
- Werd and Friesenberg (in the foreground) as seen from Uetliberg

- Flag Coat of arms

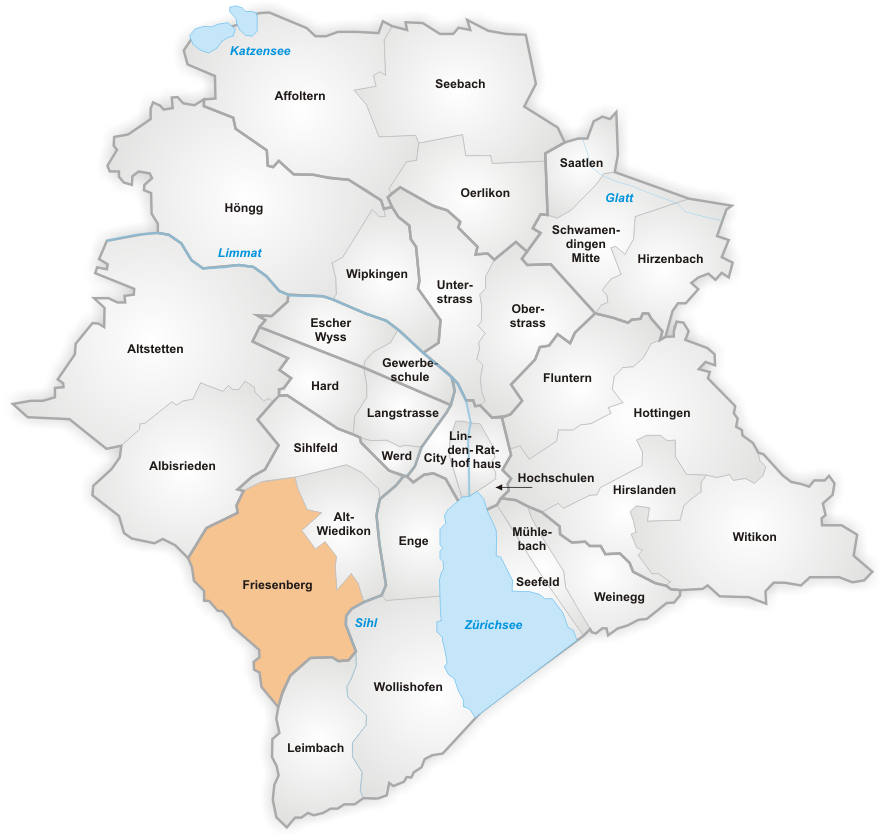
- The quarter of Friesenberg in Zurich
- Coordinates: 47°21′25″N 8°30′18″E
- Country: Switzerland
- Canton: Zurich
- City: Zurich
- District: 3

Friesenberg (Swiss Standard German pronunciation: [ˈfriːzn̩bɛrɡ]) is a district at the foot of the Uetliberg in the city of Zurich in Switzerland. The district is part of the formerly independent municipality of Wiedikon, which was incorporated in 1893 and now forms urban district 3.

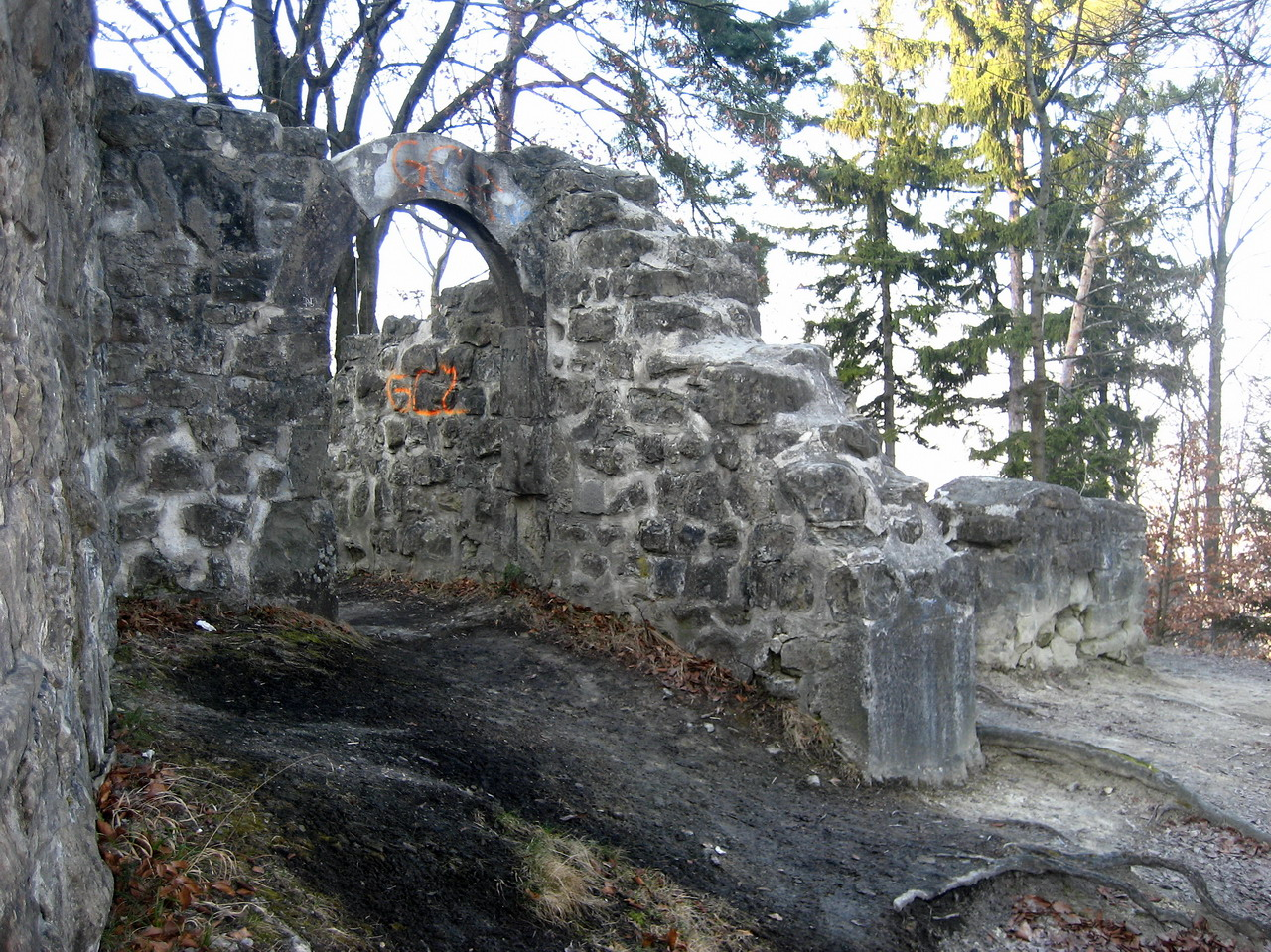
Friesenberg Castle

Aerial view by Walter Mittelholzer (1933)

== Geography ==
Situated at the southern slope of the Uetliberg mountain, Friesenberg was formerly a part of Wiedikon municipality, which was incorporated into Zürich in 1893.

== Demographics ==
The quarter has a population of 10,360 distributed on an area of 5.15 km^{2}.

== Jewish cemeteries ==
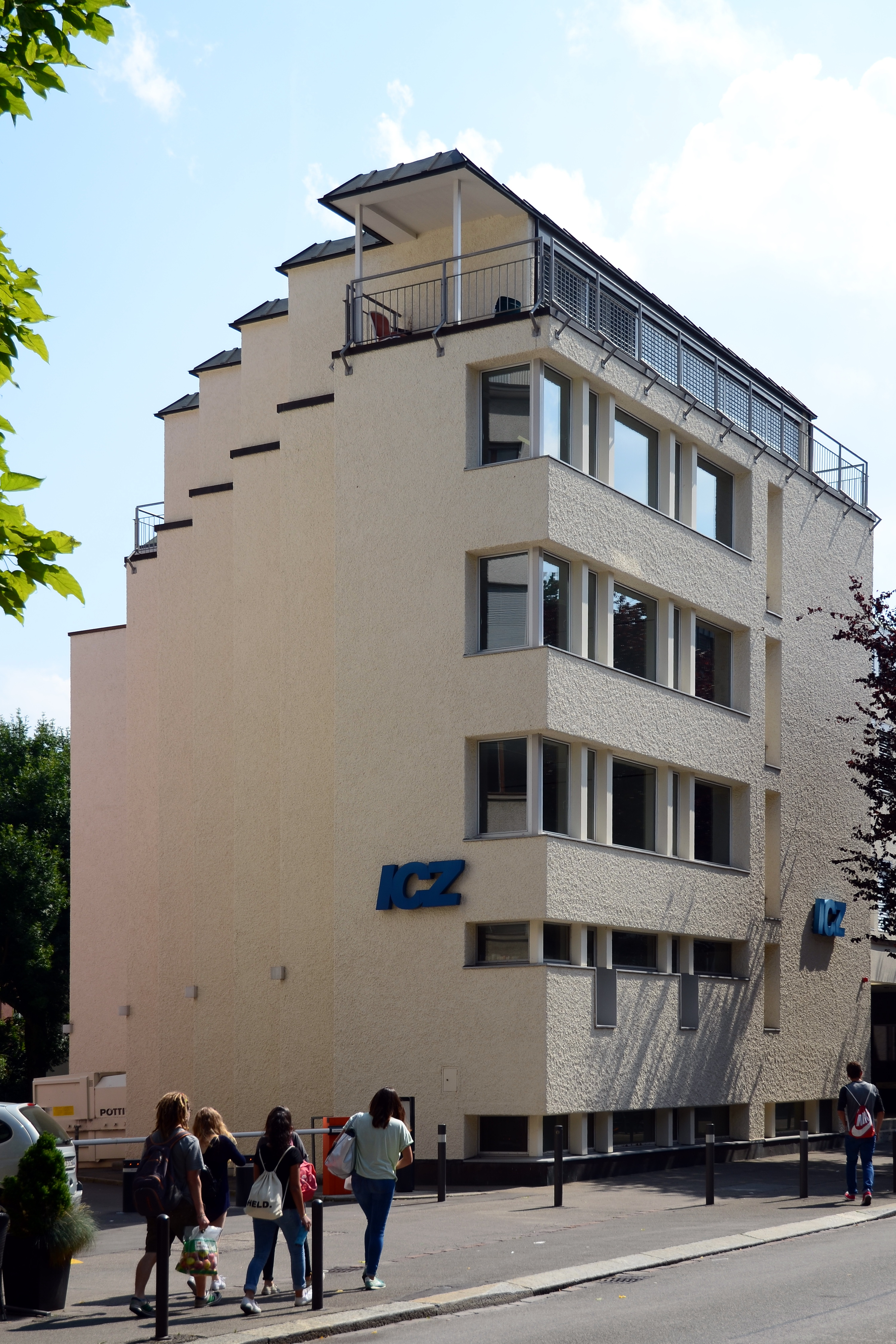
ICZ building and library in Zürich-Enge

On 5 July 1865 the Jewish community, which at that time numbered 30 members, mentioned the acquisition of a field for applying a cemetery. On 31 May 1866 the Unterer Friesenberg cemetery was inaugurated on occasion of the first funeral of a Jewish woman in Zürich. In 1892 a cemetery hall was built, and after several expansions, a large second site was bought in 1916. Since the installation of the second cemetery in 1952, fewer and fewer burials were done at the very first Jewish cemetery in Zürich since the 14th century. Notable interments include Felix Salten (1860–1945), Joseph Schmidt (1904–1942) and Otto Klemperer (1885–1973). Oberer Friesenberg cemetery, the second cemetery of the Israelitische Cultusgemeinde Zürich (ICZ), was inaugurated in 1952 and extended in 1988. At the cemetery grounds there is a large cemetery hall with rooms for ablution. A memorial stone (limestone cube) by Susi Guggenheim Weil recalls the victims of in the Nazi era. Notable interments include Kurt Hirschfeld (1902–1964), Mascha Kaléko (1907–1975), Erwin Leiser (1923–1996), Jenny Splatter Schaner (1907–1996), Margarete Susman (1872–1966), Lydia Woog (1913–2003), and Sigi Feigel (1921–2004), the former ICZ president.

== Transportation ==
The Friesenberg quarter is served by a number of railway stations on line S10 of the Zürich S-Bahn. These include Zürich Friesenberg, Zürich Schweighof and Zürich Triemli stations.

== Literature ==
- Statistical overview from Zürich city (German language): Quartierspiegel Friesenberg. Zürich 2011 (PDF; 2.85 MB)
