= Triemli Hospital =

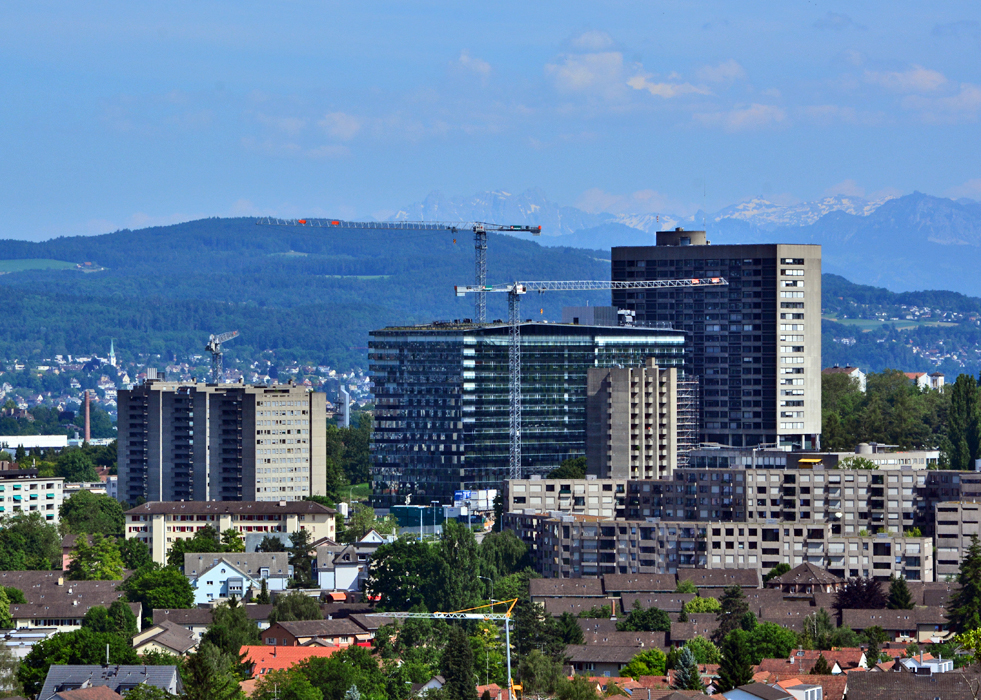
- The Stadtspital Triemli

Geography
- Location: Zurich, canton of Zurich, Switzerland
- Coordinates: 47°21′57″N 8°29′52″E

Services
- Beds: 550

Helipads
| Number | Length | | Surface |
| Number | ft | m | Surface |
|---|---|---|---|
| | | | * Triemlispital: 80: Triemli: 9 14; Zürich Triemli: S10 |

Links
- Website: www.stadt-zuerich.ch
- Lists: Hospitals in Switzerland

Triemli Hospital, also known in German as Stadtspital Triemli or Triemlispital, is a major hospital in the Swiss city of Zürich. The hospital is located in the western suburbs of the city, in the Friesenberg quarter and the Wiedikon district.

Triemli Hospital is a municipal central hospital owned and run by the city of Zürich. It offers its services to patients with all classes of medical insurance. Besides accepting patients from within the city, as a central hospital it also accepts patients forwarded from neighbouring hospitals in the cantons of Glarus, Grisons, Schaffhausen, Schwyz, Uri, Zug and Zürich.

== Transportation ==
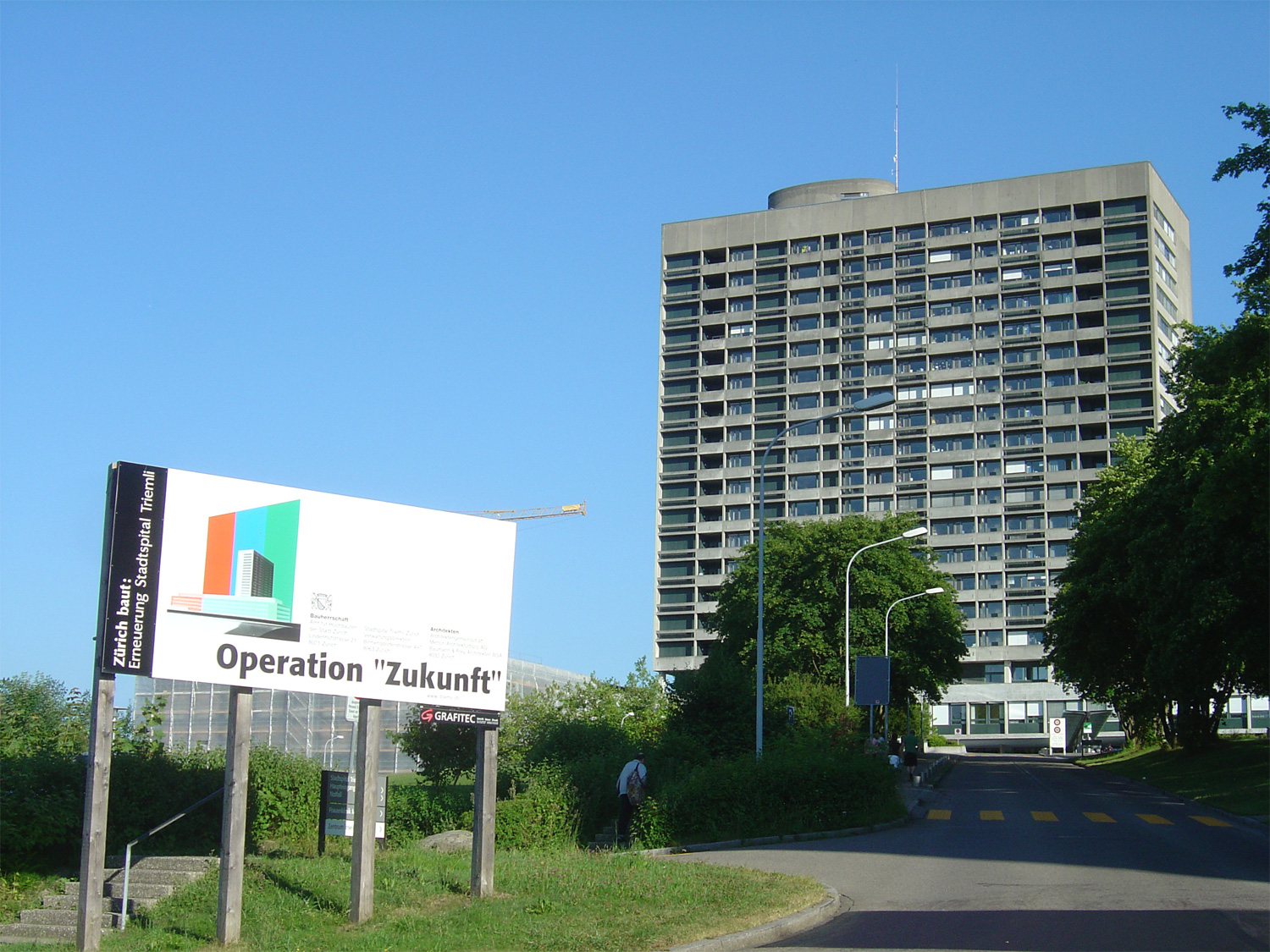

The Zürich Triemli railway station, on line S10 of the Zürich S-Bahn, is situated immediately to the south of the hospital site. There is also a bus stop (Triemlispital) of VBZ line 80 in front of the main entrance. Additionally, the Triemli terminus of Zurich tram routes 9 and 14 is situated on the northern side of the hospital site. All public transport stops have direct pedestrian access to the hospital.

== Infrastructure ==
The Triemli Hospital has a 550-bed facility.
