= Zürich Schweighof railway station =

Railway station in the Friesenberg quarter of the Swiss city of Zürich

Zürich Schweighof
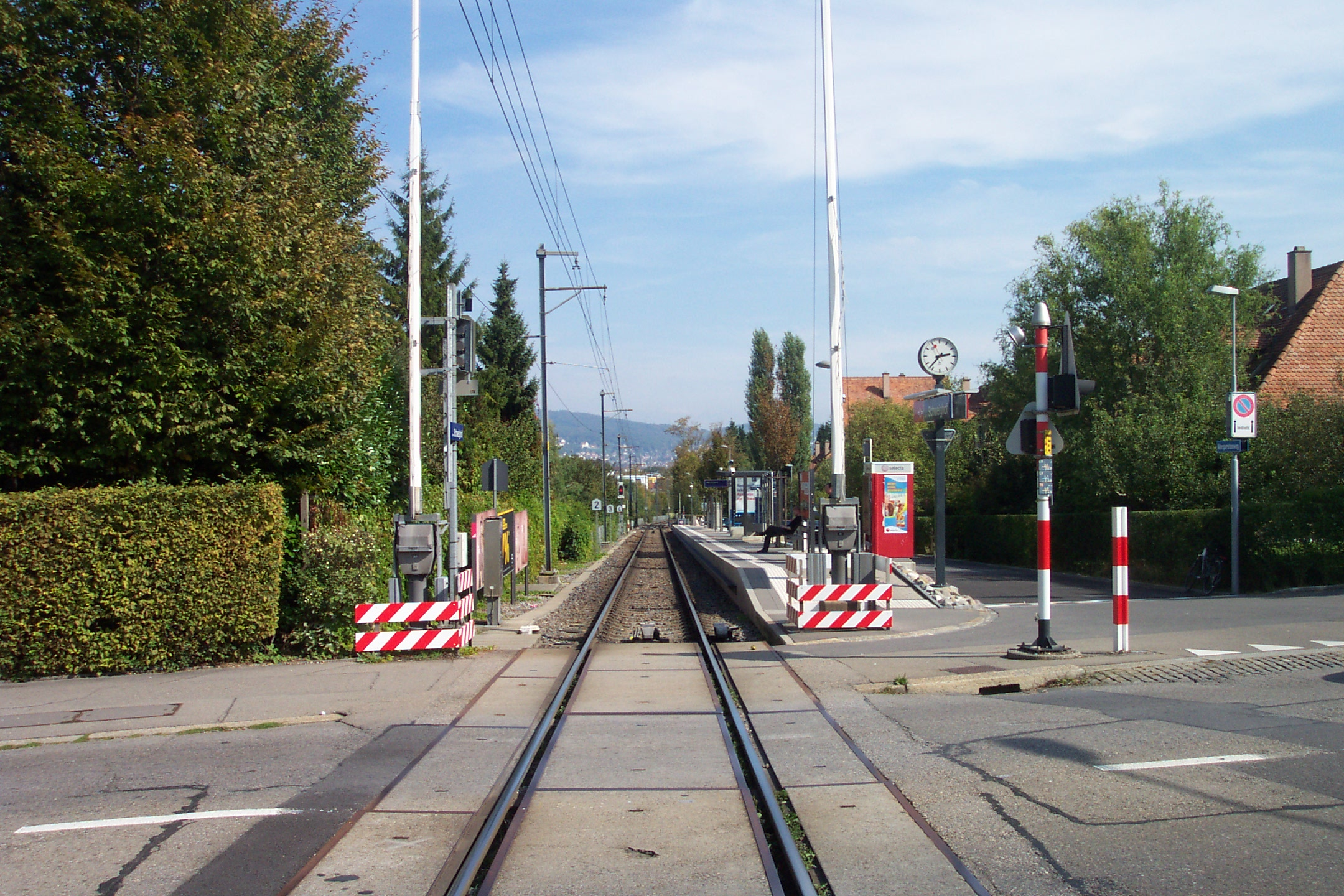
- The station, looking downhill to the station's single track and platform

General information
- Location: Schweighofstrasse, City of Zürich, Canton of Zurich, Switzerland
- Coordinates: 47.3650°N 8.5033°E
- Elevation: 459 m (1,506 ft)
- Owner: Sihltal Zürich Uetliberg Bahn
- Operator: Sihltal Zürich Uetliberg Bahn
- Line: Uetliberg line
- Platforms: 1 side platform
- Connections: ZVV: Schweighof
- Bus: VBZ bus lines 73 89

Other information
- Fare zone: ZVV 110

Services
Preceding station	Zurich S-Bahn	Following station
Zürich Triemli towards Uetliberg	S10	Zürich Friesenberg towards Zürich HB SZU
Location

Zürich Schweighof (German: Zürich Schweighof) is a railway station in the west of the Swiss city of Zurich, on Schweighofstrasse in the city's Friesenberg quarter. It is located within fare zone 110 of the Zürcher Verkehrsverbund (ZVV). The station is on the Uetliberg line, which is operated by the Sihltal Zürich Uetliberg Bahn (SZU).

== Layout ==
The station has a single track, and a single side platform. The only building is a simple shelter on the platform. Immediately to the west of the station, the line crosses Schweighofstrasse by means of a level crossing.

== Services ==
The station is served by the S10 S-Bahn service and VBZ bus lines 73 and 89:

Operator	Train Type	Route	Typical Frequency	Notes
SZU	S10	Zürich HB - Zürich Selnau - Zürich Binz - Zürich Friesenberg - Zürich Schweighof - Zürich Triemli - Uitikon Waldegg - Ringlikon - Uetliberg	3-6 trains per hour	Part of the Zurich S-Bahn. Some trains terminate at Triemli

== See also ==
- List of railway stations in Zurich
- Public transport in Zurich
