= Ringlikon railway station =

Railway station in Uitikon, Zürich, Switzerland

Ringlikon
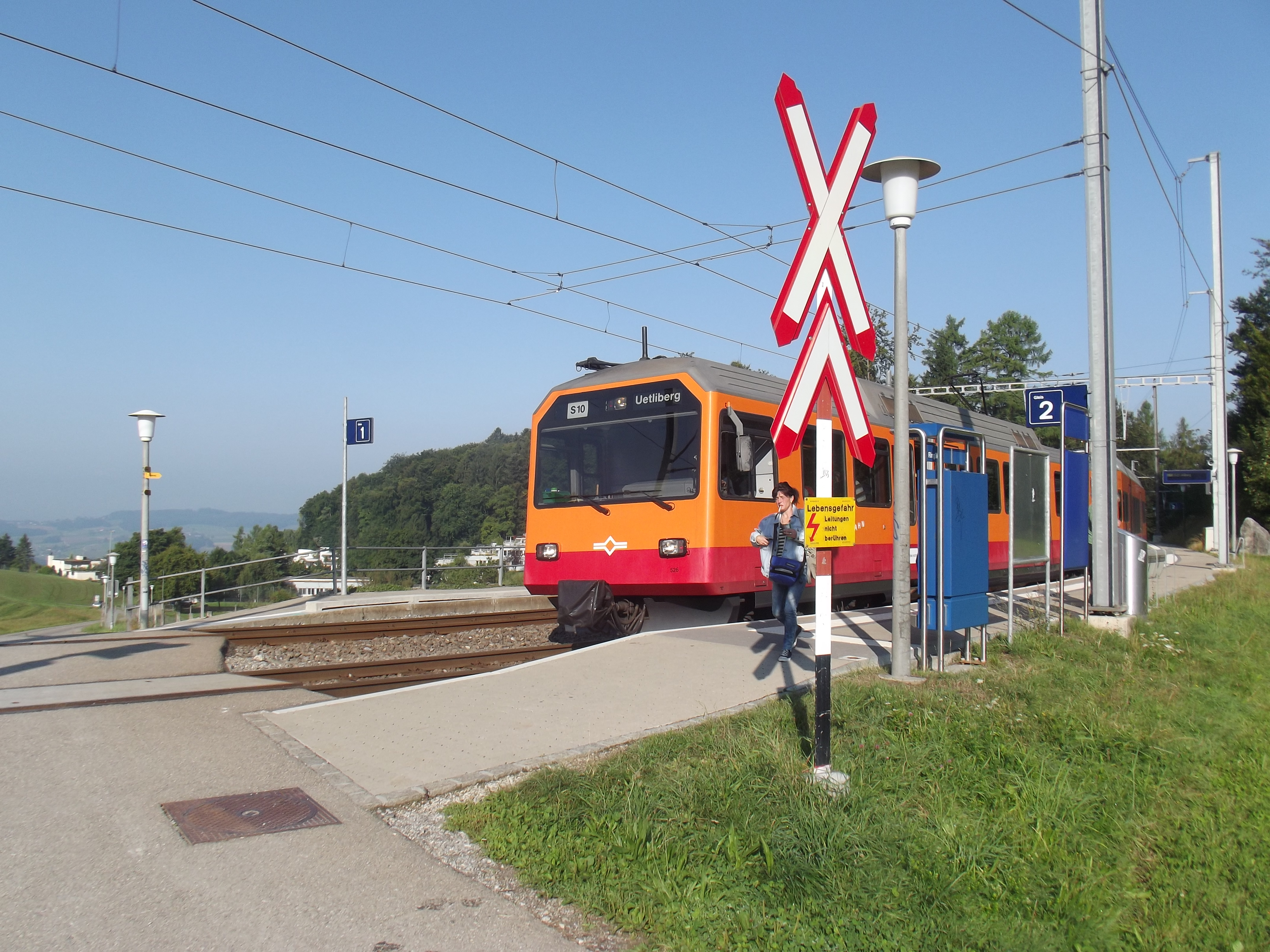

General information
- Location: Ringlikon, Uitikon, Canton of Zurich; Switzerland
- Coordinates: 47.35999°N 8.477433°E
- Elevation: 682 m (2,238 ft)
- Owner: Sihltal Zürich Uetliberg Bahn
- Operator: Sihltal Zürich Uetliberg Bahn
- Line: Uetliberg line
- Platforms: 2 side platforms
- Tracks: 2

Other information
- Fare zone: ZVV 154

Services
Preceding station	Zurich S-Bahn	Following station
Uetliberg Terminus	S10	Uitikon Waldegg towards Zürich HB SZU
Location

Ringlikon is a railway station situated near the village of Ringlikon in the municipality of Uitikon in the canton of Zurich, Switzerland. It is located within fare zone 154 of the Zürcher Verkehrsverbund (ZVV). The station is on the Uetliberg line, which is operated by the Sihltal Zürich Uetliberg Bahn (SZU).

== Layout ==
The station has a passing loop and two side platforms. It has no station building but a shelter. Ringlikon village, which is some 700 m (2,300 ft) distant and 50 m (160 ft) lower, is linked to the station by a footpath.

== Service ==
The station is served by the S10 S-Bahn service:

Operator	Train Type	Route	Typical Frequency	Notes
SZU	S10	Zürich HB - Zürich Selnau - Zürich Binz - Zürich Friesenberg - Zürich Schweighof - Zürich Triemli - Uitikon Waldegg - Ringlikon - Uetliberg	2-3 trains per hour	Part of Zurich S-Bahn

== Gallery ==
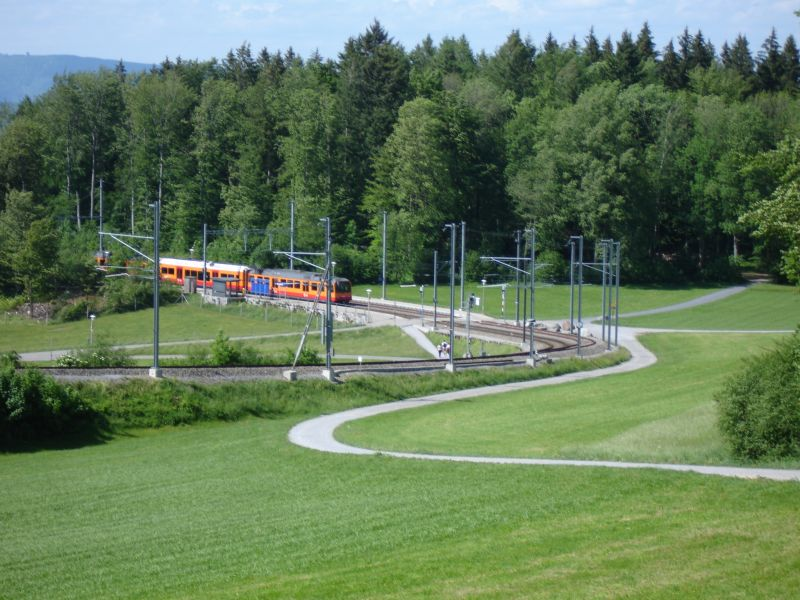
The station seen from path to Uetliberg

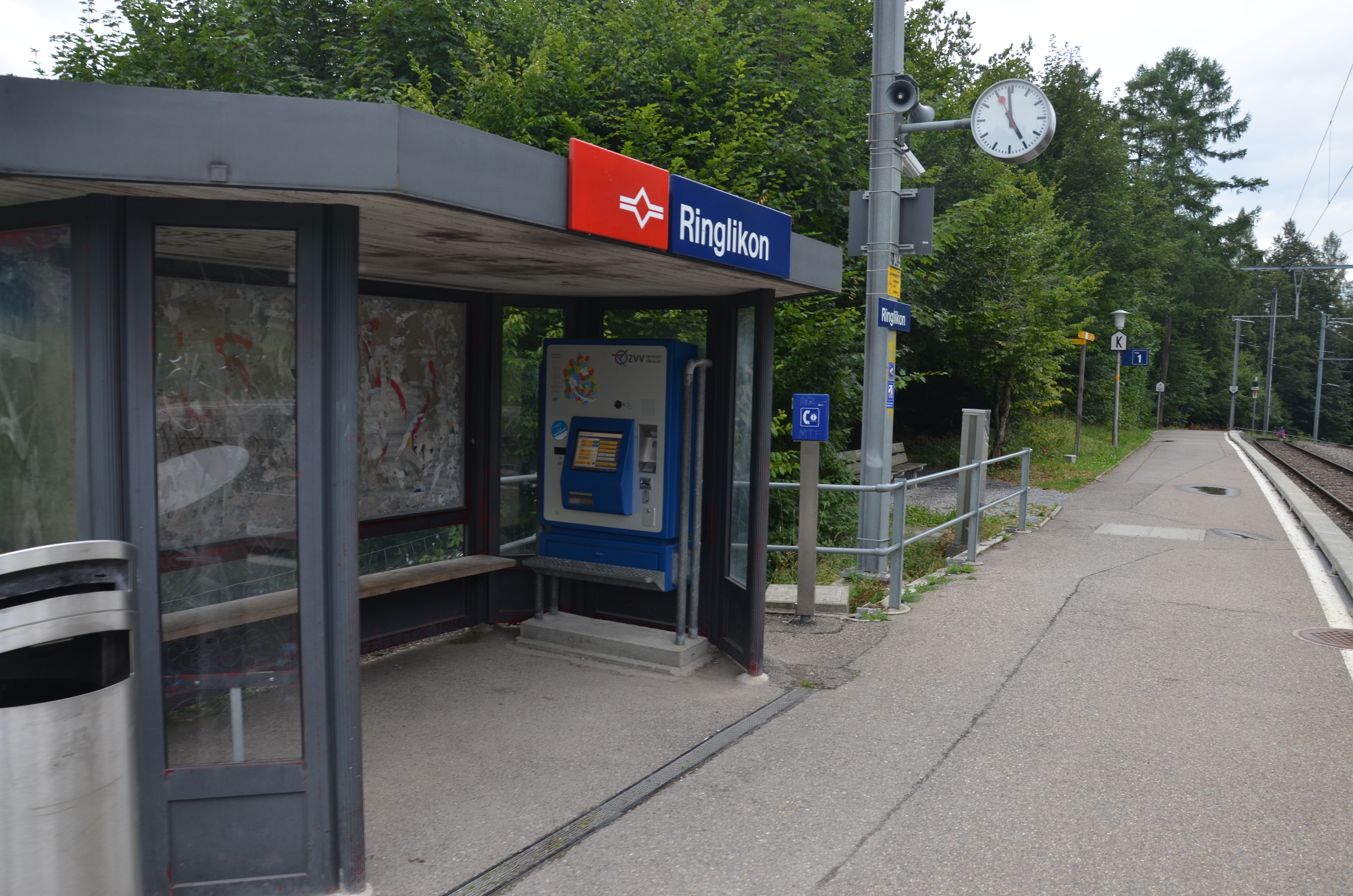
The station facilities
