= Uitikon Waldegg railway station =

Railway station in the municipality of Uitikon in the Swiss canton of Zürich

Uitikon Waldegg
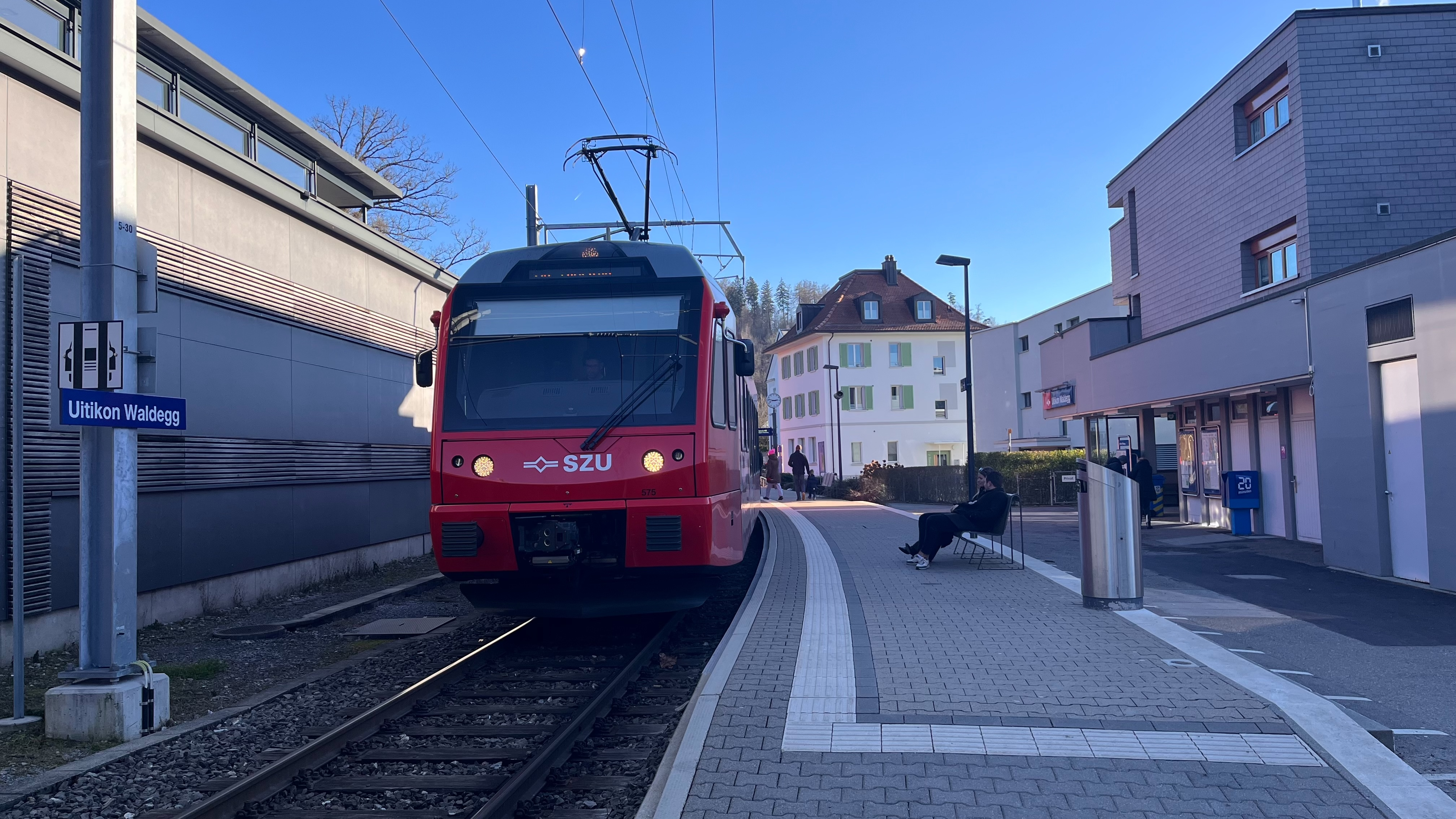

General information
- Location: Waldegg, Uitikon, Canton of Zürich, Switzerland
- Coordinates: 47.3659°N 8.4660°E
- Elevation: 620 m (2,030 ft)
- Owner: Sihltal Zürich Uetliberg Bahn
- Operator: Sihltal Zürich Uetliberg Bahn
- Line: Uetliberg line
- Platforms: 1 side platform
- Tracks: 1
- Connections: ZVV: Uitikon Waldegg, Bahnhof
- Bus: PostAuto bus line 201

Other information
- Fare zone: ZVV 154

Services
Preceding station	Zurich S-Bahn	Following station
Ringlikon towards Uetliberg	S10	Zürich Triemli towards Zürich HB SZU
Location

Uitikon Waldegg is a railway station in the village of Waldegg in the municipality of Uitikon in the canton of Zurich, Switzerland. It is located within fare zone 154 of the Zürcher Verkehrsverbund (ZVV). The station is on the Uetliberg line, which is operated by the Sihltal Zürich Uetliberg Bahn (SZU).

== Service ==
=== S-Bahn ===
The station is served by the S10 S-Bahn service:

Operator	Train Type	Route	Typical Frequency	Notes
SZU	S10	Zürich HB - Zürich Selnau - Zürich Binz - Zürich Friesenberg - Zürich Schweighof - Zürich Triemli - Uitikon Waldegg - Ringlikon - Uetliberg	2-3 trains per hour	Part of Zurich S-Bahn

=== Bus ===
The station is connected, by PostAuto bus route 201, with the villages of Uitikon and Ringlikon. The bus operates two or three times per hour from Monday to Saturday.
