= Zürich Friesenberg railway station =

Railway station in the Friesenberg quarter of the Swiss city of Zürich

Zürich Friesenberg
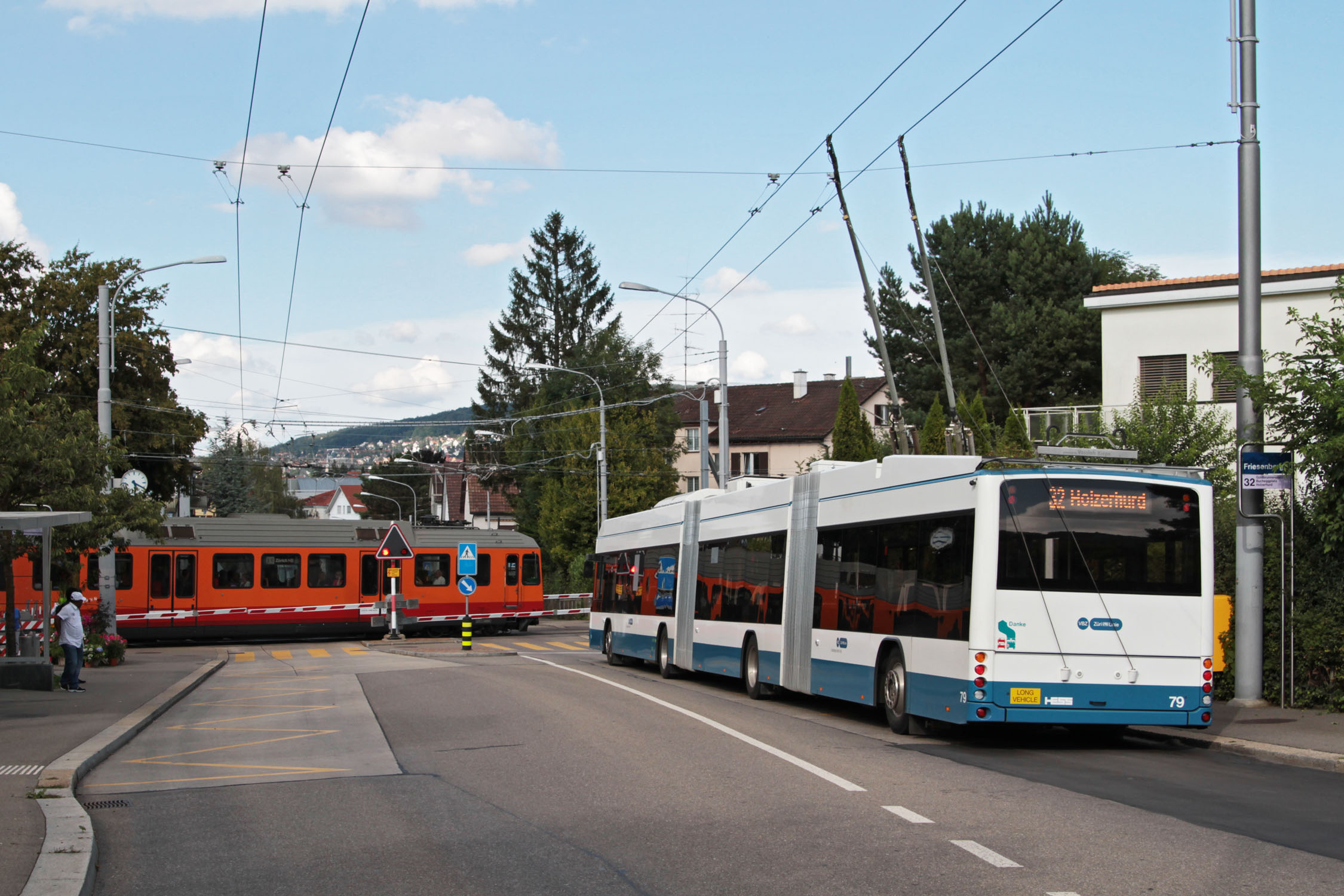
- Uetliberg train and city bi-articulated trolleybus cross at Friesenberg station

General information
- Location: Friesenberg, City of Zürich, Canton of Zürich, Switzerland
- Coordinates: 47.3647°N 8.5080°E
- Elevation: 446 m (1,463 ft)
- Owner: Sihltal Zürich Uetliberg Bahn
- Operator: Sihltal Zürich Uetliberg Bahn
- Line: Uetliberg line
- Platforms: 1 side platform
- Connections: ZVV: Friesenberg
- Trolleybus: VBZ trolleybus 32

Other information
- Fare zone: ZVV 110

Services
Preceding station	Zurich S-Bahn	Following station
Zürich Schweighof towards Uetliberg	S10	Zürich Binz towards Zürich HB SZU
Location

Zürich Friesenberg (German: Zürich Friesenberg) is a railway station in the west of the Swiss city of Zurich, in the city's Friesenberg quarter. It is located within fare zone 110 of the Zürcher Verkehrsverbund (ZVV). The station is on the Uetliberg line, which is operated by the Sihltal Zürich Uetliberg Bahn (SZU).

== Layout ==
The station has a single track and a single side platform, although the line widens into a two track dynamic passing loop on the opposite side of the level crossing on the downhill side of the station. This level crossing is notable as the Uetliberg line, electrified at 1200 V DC, is crossed here by route 32 of the Zurich trolleybus system, electrified at 600 V DC.

== Services ==
The station is served by the S10 S-Bahn service and VBZ trolleybus line 32:

Operator	Train Type	Route	Typical Frequency	Notes
SZU	S10	Zurich HB - Zürich Selnau - Zürich Binz - Zürich Friesenberg - Zürich Schweighof - Zürich Triemli - Uitikon Waldegg - Ringlikon - Uetliberg	3-6 trains per hour	Part of the Zurich S-Bahn. Some trains terminate at Triemli

== See also ==
- List of railway stations in Zurich
- Public transport in Zurich
