= Zürich Triemli railway station =

Railway station in the Friesenberg quarter of the Swiss city of Zürich

Zürich Triemli
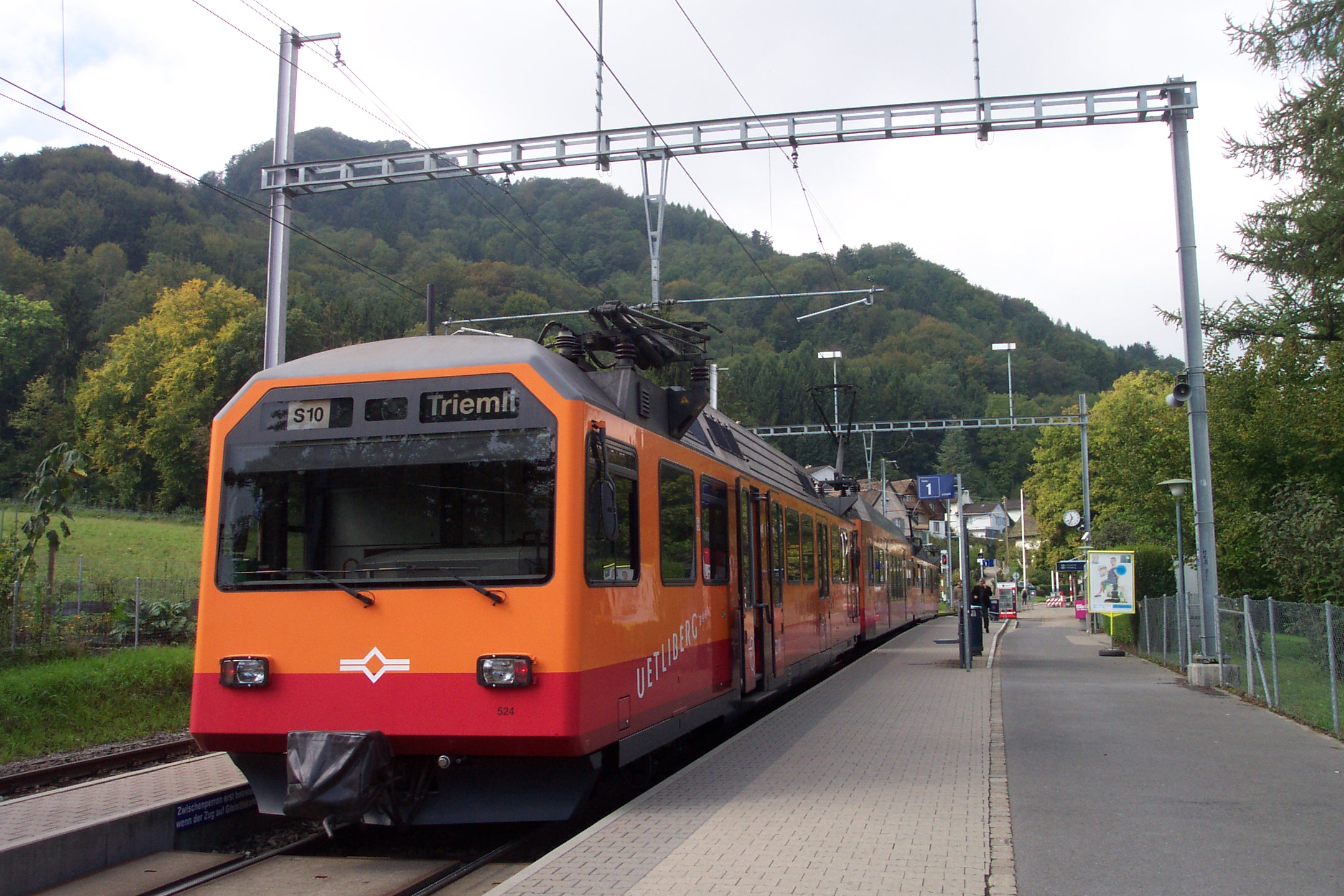
- The station with a terminating train in the platform

General information
- Location: Hohensteinweg, City of Zurich, Canton of Zurich, Switzerland
- Coordinates: 47.3650°N 8.4952°E
- Elevation: 485 m (1,591 ft)
- Owner: Sihltal Zürich Uetliberg Bahn
- Operator: Sihltal Zürich Uetliberg Bahn
- Line: Uetliberg line
- Platforms: 1 side platform
- Tracks: 1
- Connections: ZVV: Triemlispital / Triemli
- Tram: VBZ tram lines 9 14
- Bus: VBZ bus 80

Other information
- Fare zone: ZVV 110

Services
Preceding station	Zurich S-Bahn	Following station
Uitikon Waldegg towards Uetliberg	S10	Zürich Schweighof towards Zürich HB SZU
Location

Zürich Triemli (German: Zürich Triemli) is a railway station in the west of the Swiss city of Zurich, adjacent to the Triemli Hospital in the city's Friesenberg quarter. It is located within fare zone 110 of the Zürcher Verkehrsverbund (ZVV). The station is on the Uetliberg line, which is owned and operated by the Sihltal Zürich Uetliberg Bahn (SZU).

== Layout ==
Situated on a single track line, the station has a single side platform. It previously had a passing loop and two platforms, prior to renovation of the station. Besides being served by through trains between Zürich HB and Uetliberg railway stations, Triemli is also the terminus of a more frequent suburban shuttle service from Zürich HB.

The station is adjacent to the Triemli Hospital, one of Zurich's main hospitals, and there is direct access from the station platform to the hospital site. A level crossing carries Hohensteinweg across the line immediately to the west of the station.

== Services ==
=== S-Bahn ===
The station is served by the S10 S-Bahn service:

Operator	Train Type	Route	Typical Frequency	Notes
SZU	S10	Zürich HB - Zürich Selnau - Zürich Binz - Zürich Friesenberg - Zürich Schweighof - Zürich Triemli - Uitikon Waldegg - Ringlikon - Uetliberg	3-6 trains per hour to Zurich, 2-3 per hour to Uetliberg	Part of Zurich S-Bahn. Some trains terminate here and return to Zürich HB

=== Connections to trams and bus ===
The station is some 400 metres (1,300 ft) on foot away from the terminal bus stop of VBZ bus line 80, located near the entrance of Triemli Hospital (Triemlispital). It is some 500 metres (1,600 ft) on foot from the Triemli terminus of tram lines 9 and 14, which lies at a lower level on the other side of the hospital site.

== Gallery ==
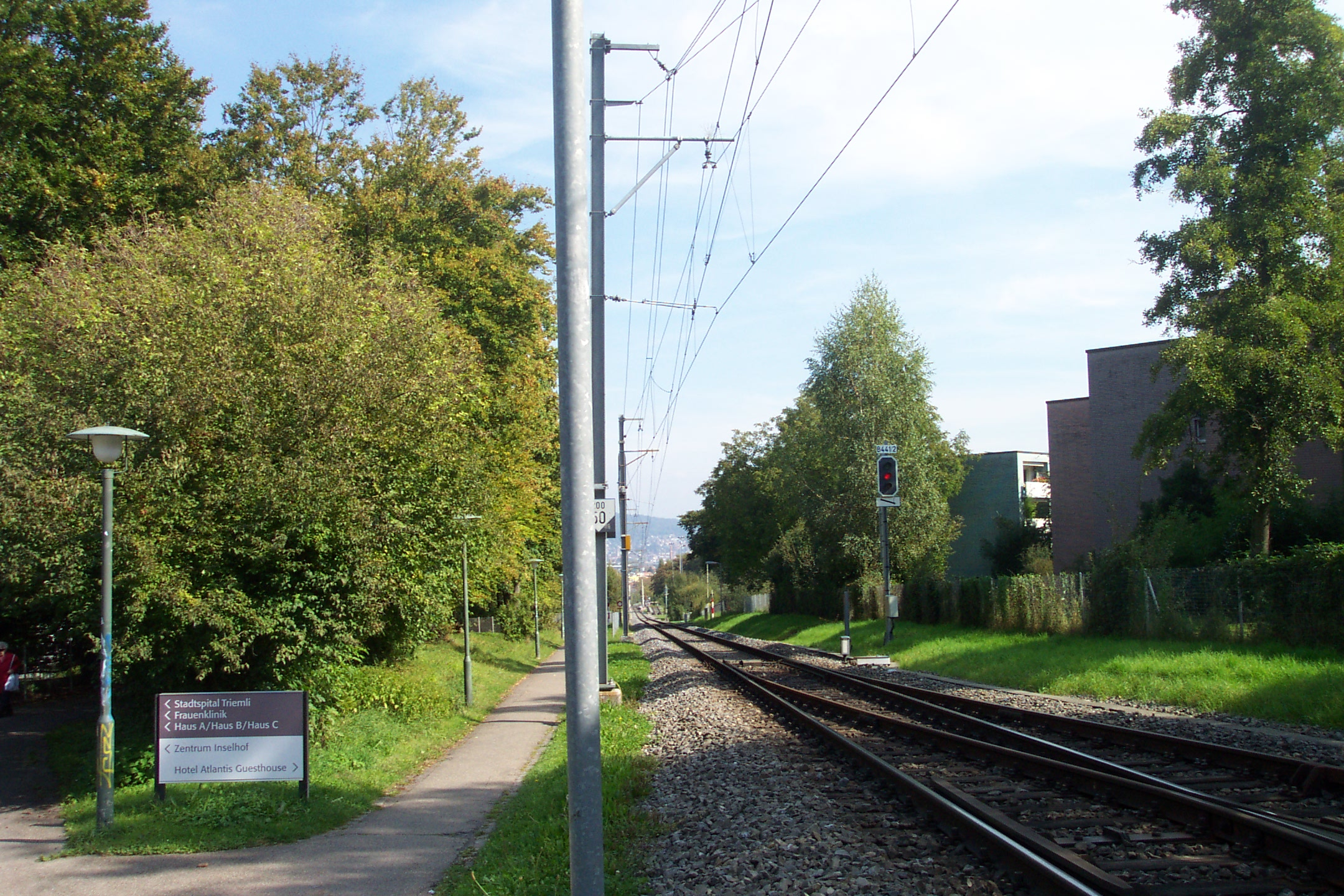
Looking downhill towards Zurich with an entrance to the Stadtspital Triemli to the left

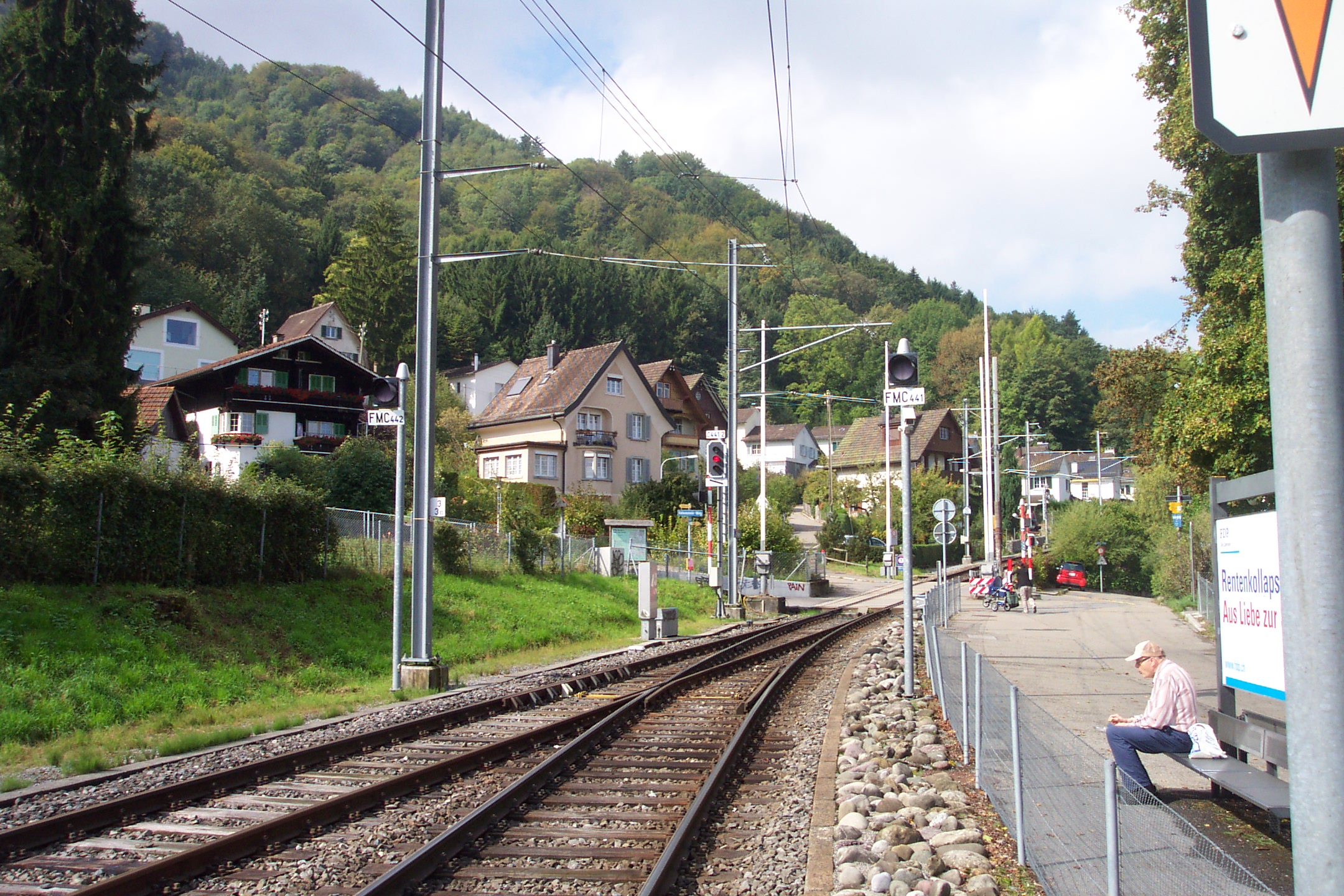
Looking uphill towards the Uetliberg with the level crossing of Hohensteinweg

== See also ==
- List of railway stations in Zurich
- Public transport in Zurich
