= Zürich Binz railway station =

Railway station on the Uetliberg line in the Swiss city of Zürich

Zürich Binz
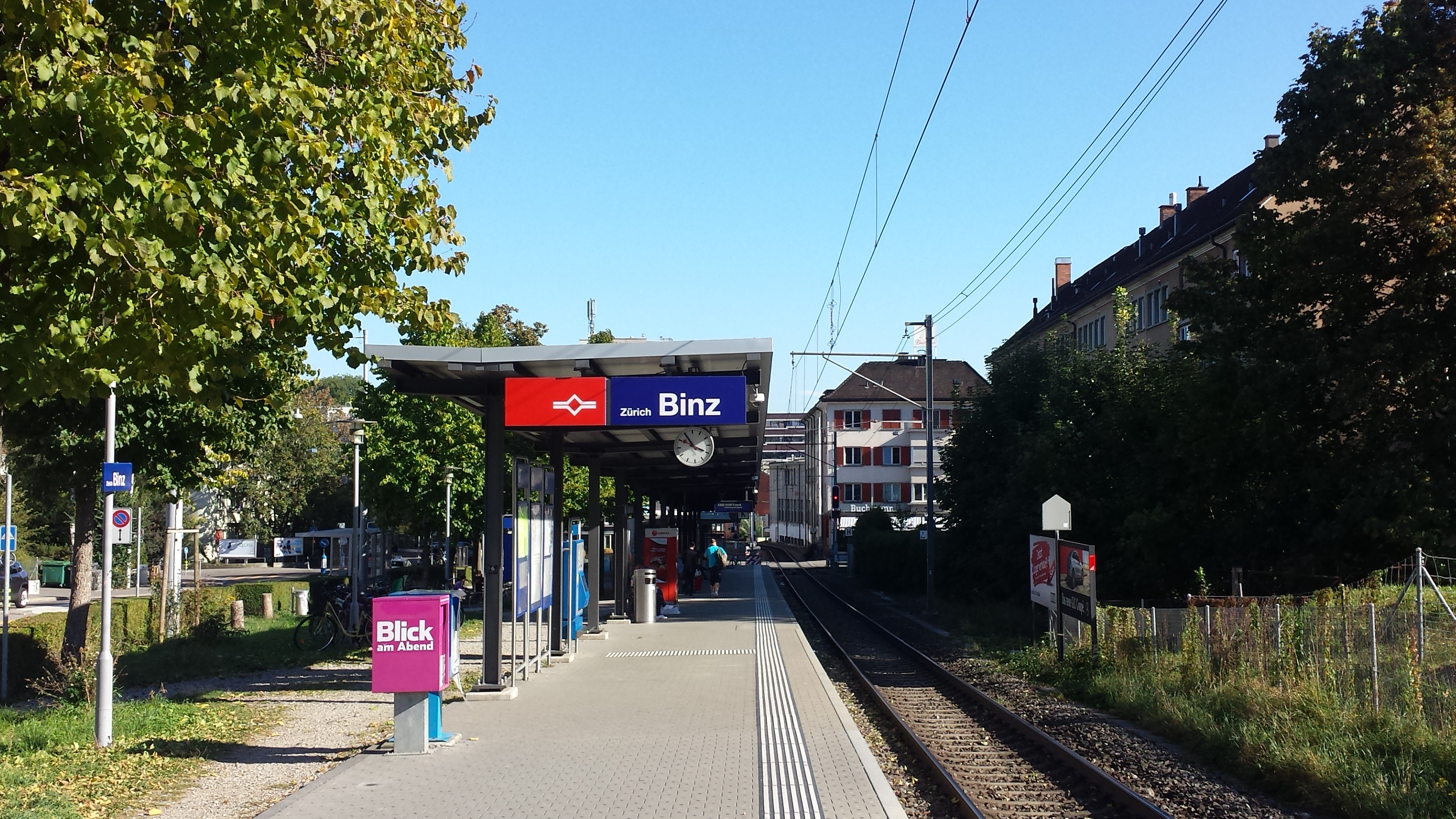

General information
- Location: Alt-Wiedikon, City of Zurich, Canton of Zurich, Switzerland
- Coordinates: 47.362846°N 8.517945°E
- Elevation: 421 m (1,381 ft)
- Owner: Sihltal Zürich Uetliberg Bahn
- Operator: Sihltal Zürich Uetliberg Bahn
- Line: Uetliberg line
- Platforms: 1 side platform
- Connections: ZVV: Binz
- Bus: VBZ bus line 76

Other information
- Fare zone: ZVV 110

Services
Preceding station	Zurich S-Bahn	Following station
Zürich Friesenberg towards Uetliberg	S10	Zürich Selnau towards Zürich HB SZU
Location

Zürich Binz (German: Zürich Binz) is a railway station in the west of the Swiss city of Zurich, in the city's Alt-Wiedikon quarter. It is located within fare zone 110 of the Zürcher Verkehrsverbund (ZVV). The station is on the Uetliberg line, which is owned and operated by the Sihltal Zürich Uetliberg Bahn (SZU).

== Services ==
The station is served by the S10 S-Bahn service and VBZ bus line 76:

Operator	Train Type	Route	Typical Frequency	Notes
SZU	S10	Zürich HB - Zürich Selnau - Zürich Binz - Zürich Friesenberg - Zürich Schweighof - Zürich Triemli - Uitikon Waldegg - Ringlikon - Uetliberg	3-6 trains per hour	Part of Zurich S-Bahn. Some trains terminate at Triemli

The station has a single track, with a single platform, although there is a dynamic passing loop between Binz and Friesenberg. Between Binz and Selnau, all Uetliberg line trains run non-stop, although they pass by Giesshübel station, on the SZU's Sihltal line.

== See also ==
- List of railway stations in Zurich
- Public transport in Zurich
