= Uetliberg railway station =

Railway station in Switzerland, situated near to the summit of the Üetliberg mountain

Uetliberg
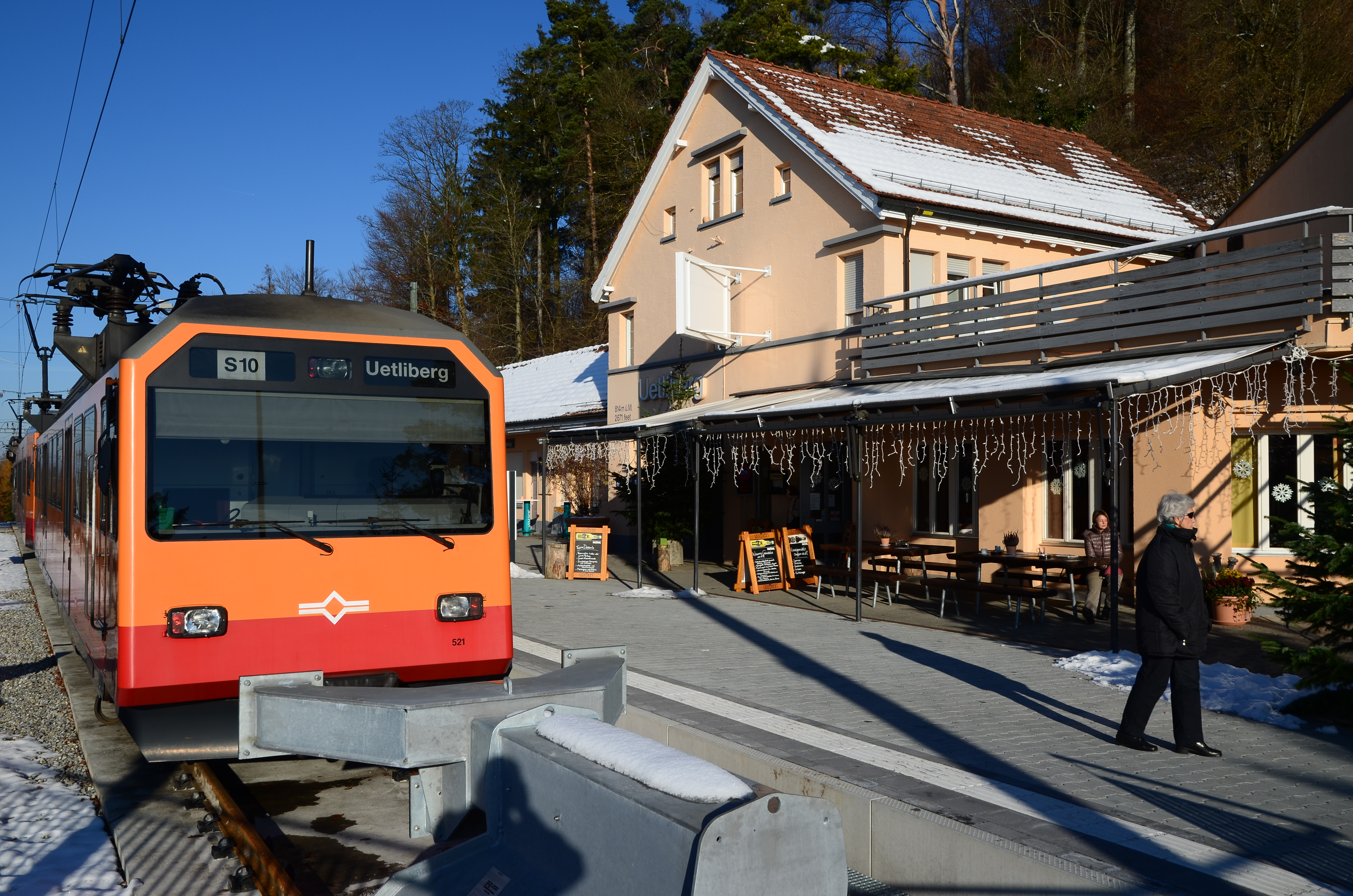

General information
- Location: Uetliberg, Stallikon, Canton of Zurich, Switzerland
- Coordinates: 47.3518°N 8.4876°E
- Elevation: 813 m (2,667 ft)
- Owner: Sihltal Zürich Uetliberg Bahn
- Operator: Sihltal Zürich Uetliberg Bahn
- Line: Uetliberg line
- Platforms: 2 side platforms
- Tracks: 2

Other information
- Fare zone: ZVV 155

Services
Preceding station	Zurich S-Bahn	Following station
Terminus	S10	Ringlikon towards Zürich HB SZU
Location

Uetliberg railway station, situated near the summit of Uetliberg mountain, the Hausberg of the city of Zurich in Switzerland, is the upper terminus of the Uetliberg line of the Sihltal Zürich Uetliberg Bahn (SZU), within fare zone 155 of the Zürcher Verkehrsverbund (ZVV). The railway station is located within the municipality of Stallikon, although the adjacent mountain-top is divided between Stallikon and the city of Zurich.

The station lies some 650 m (2,130 ft) from, and 56 m (184 ft) below, the summit of Uetliberg, to which it is linked by a footpath. It has two terminal tracks with two side platforms, and a substantial station building, which includes a restaurant.

== Services ==
The station is served year-round by S-Bahn trains of the S10 service of Zurich S-Bahn:

Operator	Train Type	Route	Typical Frequency	Notes
SZU	S10	Zürich HB - Zürich Selnau - Zürich Binz - Zürich Friesenberg - Zürich Schweighof - Zürich Triemli - Uitikon Waldegg - Ringlikon - Uetliberg	2-3 trains per hour	Zürich S-Bahn

== History ==
The station dates back to 1875, when the Uetlibergbahn-Gesellschaft opened its line from Zürich Selnau railway station, then a surface terminal station, to the summit of the Uetliberg mountain. Since 1990, Selnau is a below-ground through station and the line continues to Zürich HB SZU, a subsurface station that is connected with Zürich Hauptbahnhof (Zürich HB), the city's central station. The line was electrified using the direct current system in 1923.

== Gallery ==
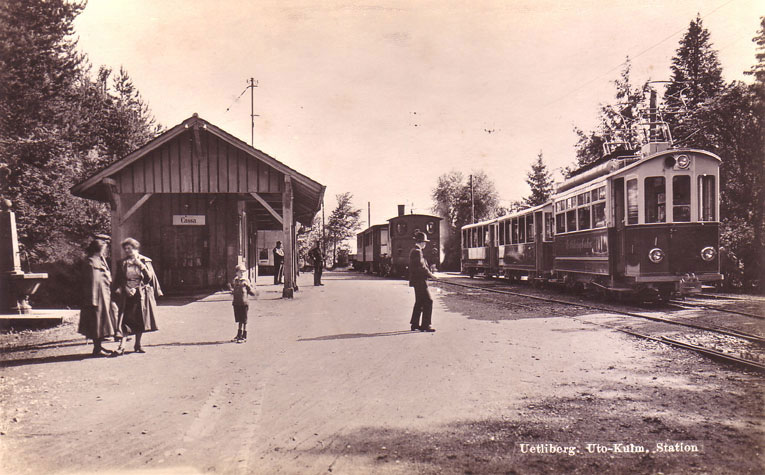
The station in 1925, with both steam and electric trains

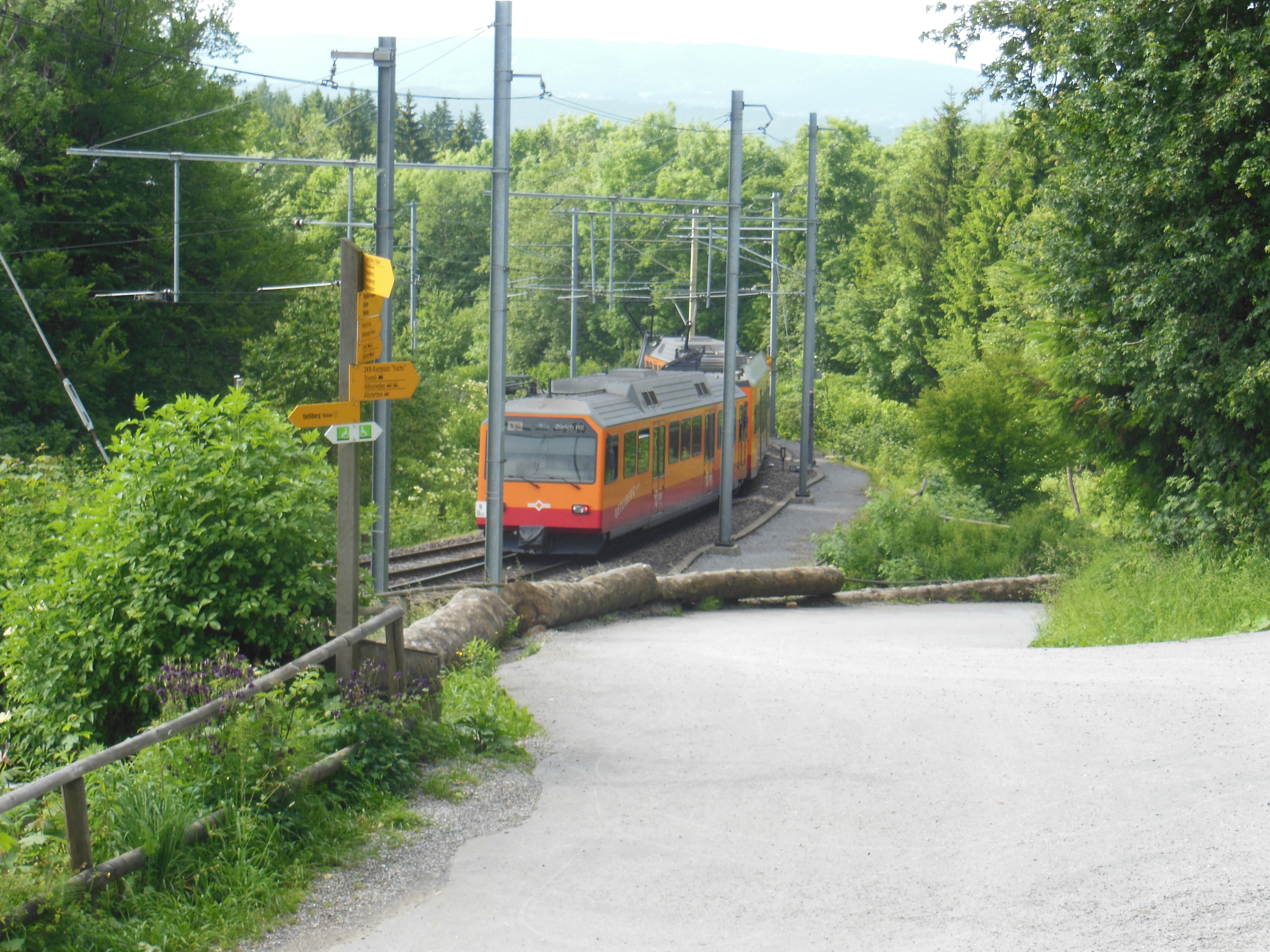
Train approaching the station

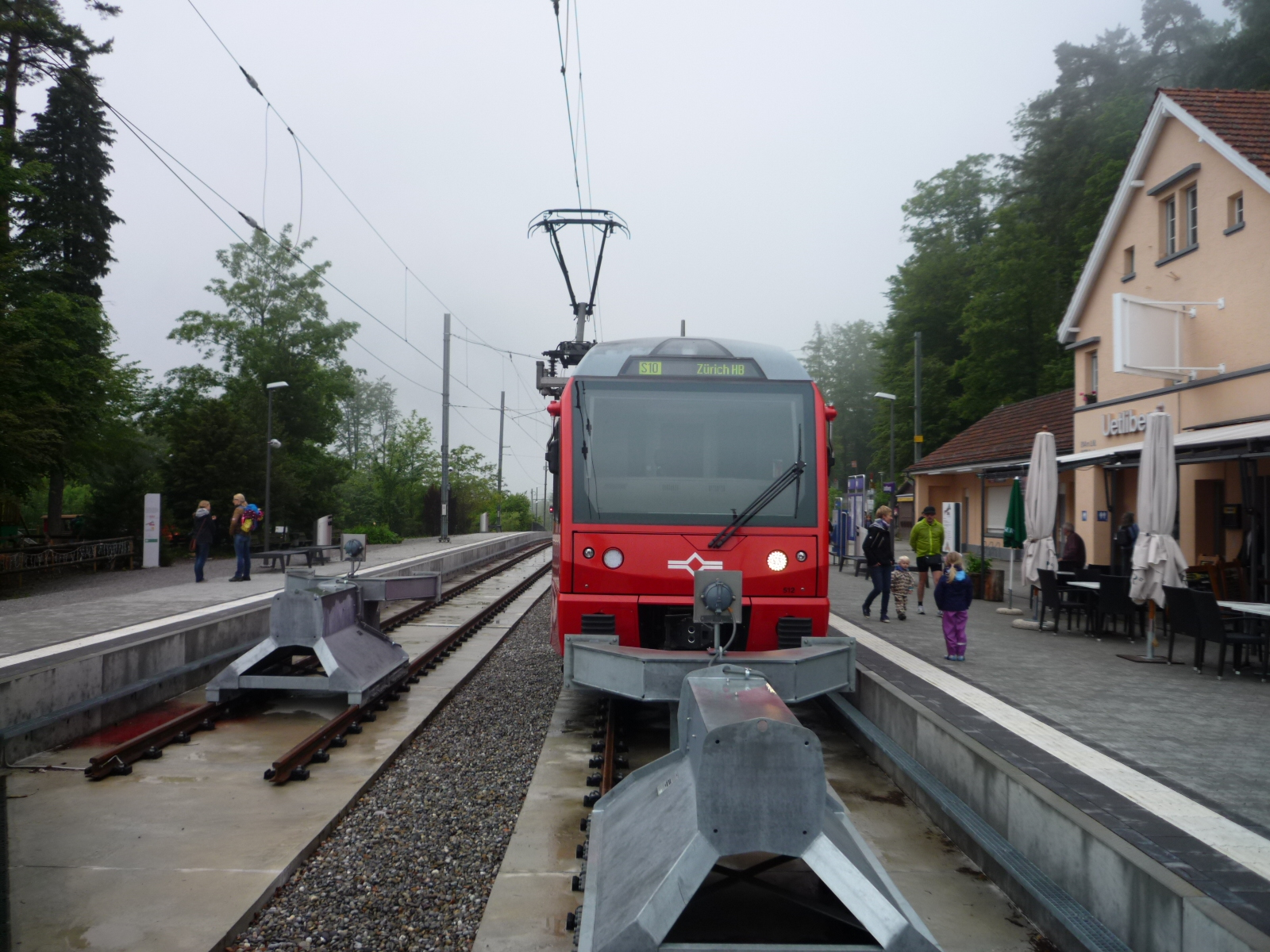
View from the end of the station platform, looking north

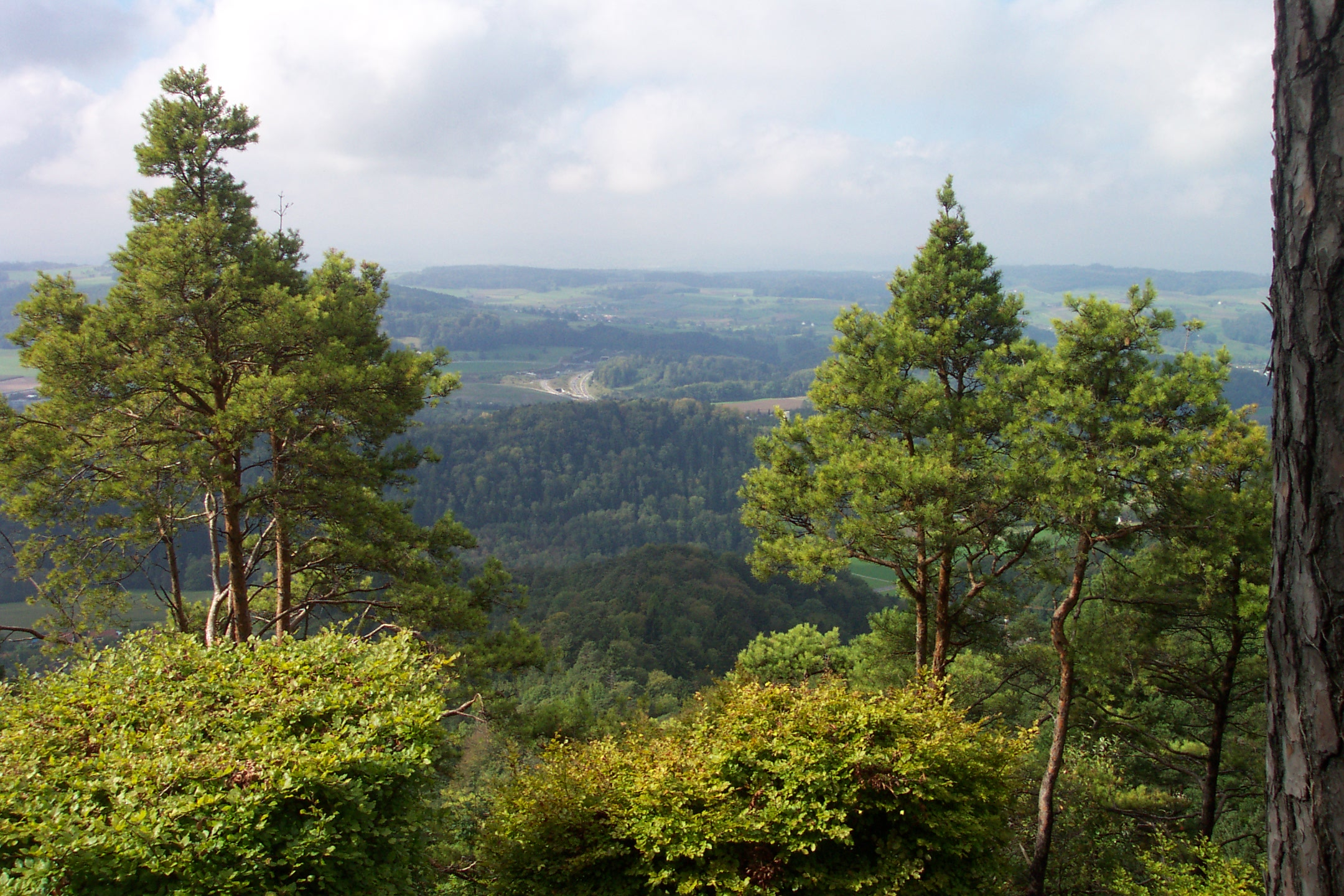
View from the end of the station platform, looking west

== See also ==
- Public transport in Zurich
- Rail transport in Switzerland
