= Uetliberg railway line =

Railway service in Switzerland

Uetliberg railway line (S10)
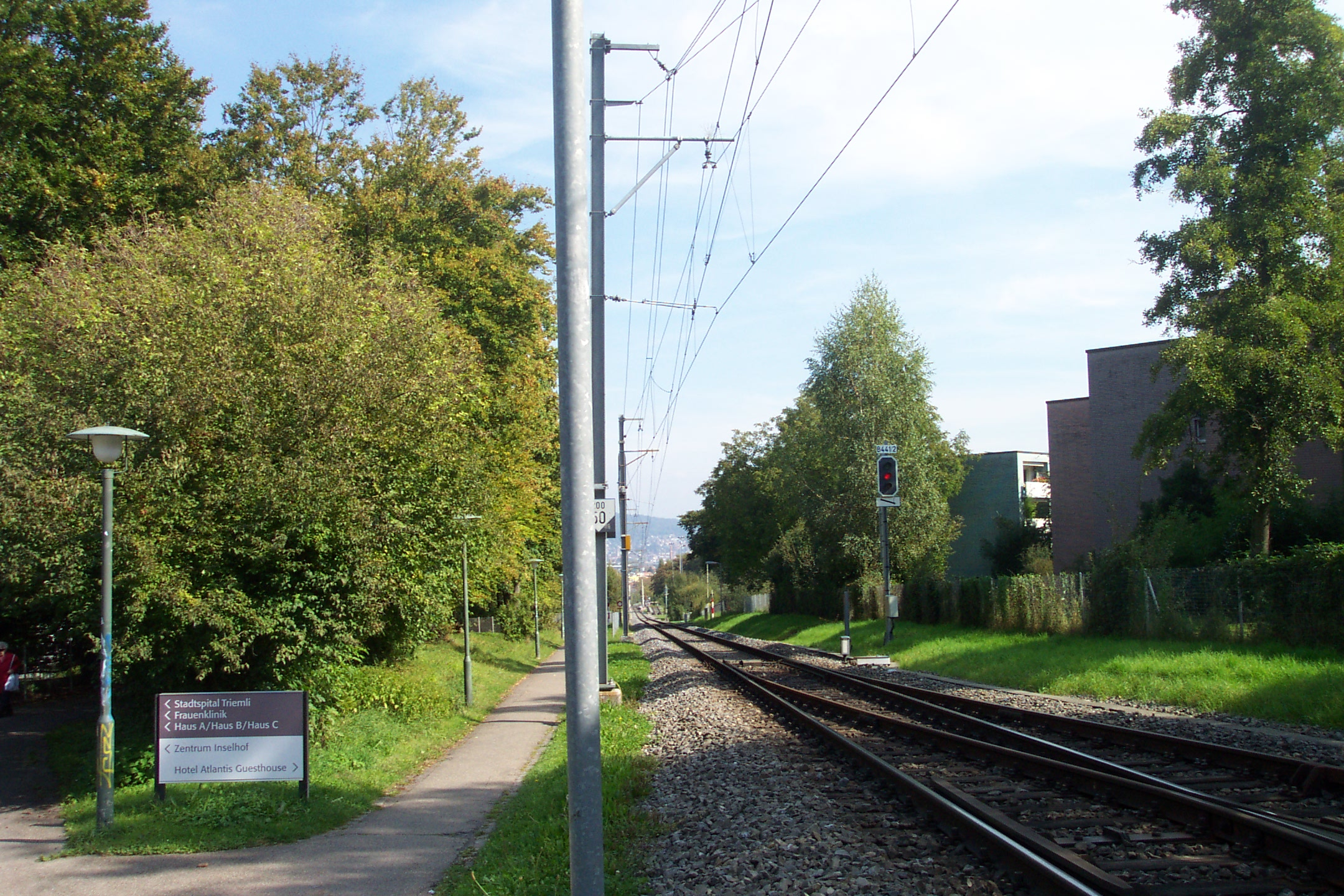
- View down the line towards Zurich from Triemli, showing gradient

Overview
- Status: Operational
- Owner: Sihltal Zürich Uetliberg Bahn
- Locale: Zurich, Switzerland
- Termini: Zürich HB SZU; Uetliberg
- Stations: 9

Service
- Type: Heavy rail with light rail attributes, carrying an S-Bahn service
- System: Zurich S-Bahn
- Services: 1
- Operator: Sihltal Zürich Uetliberg Bahn
- Depot: Giesshübel

History
- Opened: 1875

Technical
- Line length: 10.3 km (6.4 mi)
- Num of tracks: Mixture of single and double track
- Track gauge: 1,435 mm (4 ft 8 1/2 in) standard gauge
- Electrification: 15 kV 16.7 Hz AC
- Maximum incline: 7.9%

The Uetliberg railway line (German: Uetlibergbahn) is a passenger railway line which runs from Zürich Hauptbahnhof (Zürich HB SZU underground platforms), the central station in the Swiss city of Zurich, through the city's western outskirts to near the summit of the Uetliberg, Zurich's Hausberg and local recreational area. The route serves as line S10 of Zurich S-Bahn, with the ZVV's standards zonal fares applying.

The line was opened in 1875 and electrified in 1923. In 1990 it was extended to its current terminus at Zürich HB SZU, beneath Zürich Hauptbahnhof. Today it is owned by the Sihltal Zürich Uetliberg Bahn, a company that also owns the Sihltal line, and operates other transport services.

The line has a maximum gradient of 7.9% and is the steepest standard gauge adhesion railway in Europe. It carries both leisure and local commuter traffic.

== History ==
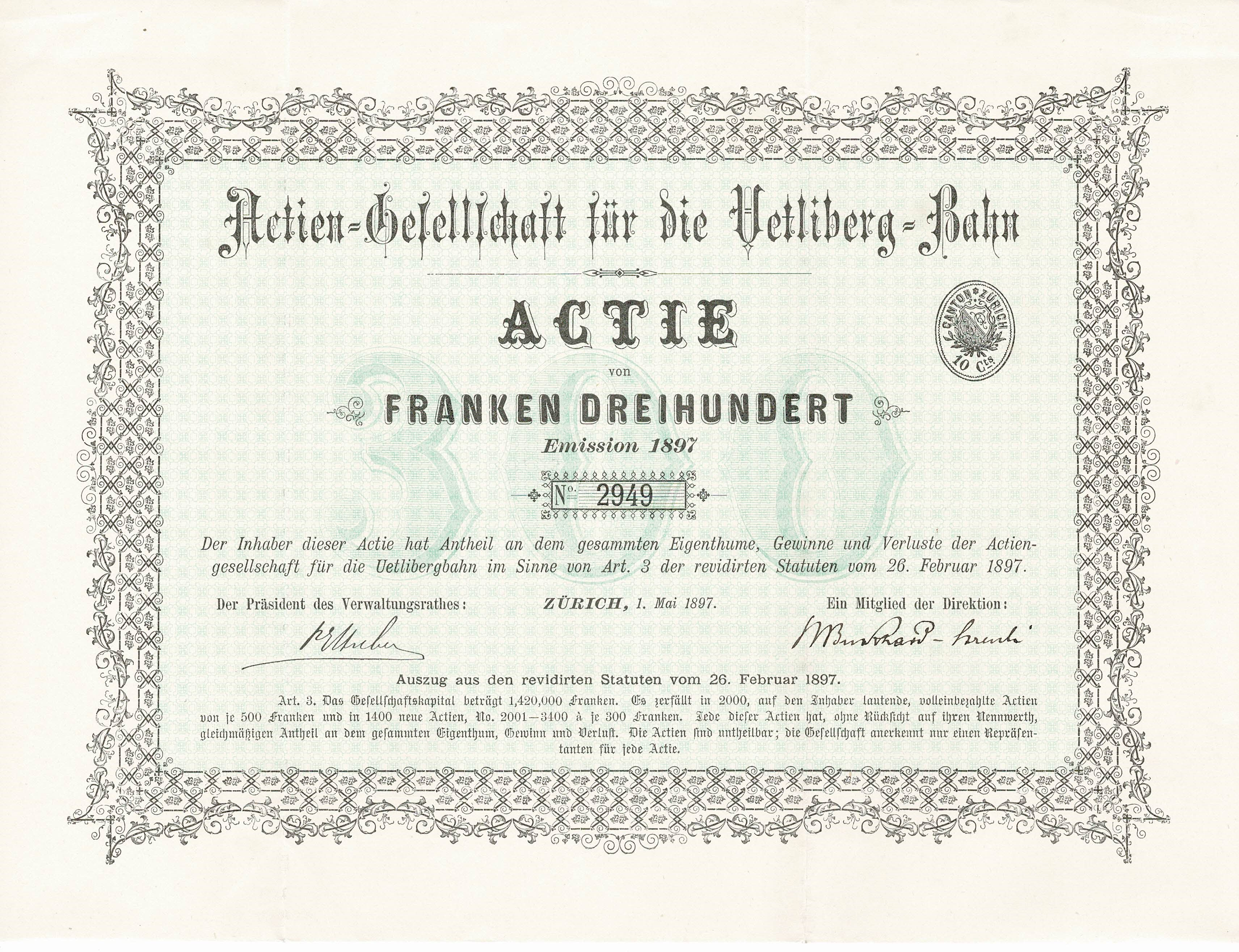
Share of the Uetliberg-Bahn-Gesellschaft, issued 1. May 1897

The Uetliberg line was built by the Uetlibergbahn-Gesellschaft, which opened its line from Selnau station in Zurich to the summit of the Uetliberg mountain in 1875. In 1892 the Sihltal line was opened by another company, running from the Uetliberg line's Selnau station to Sihlwald.

In 1920 the Uetlibergbahn-Gesellschaft became bankrupt and was liquidated. Two years later the line was taken over by the Bahngesellschaft Zürich–Uetliberg (BZUe), and one year after that it was electrified. The original electric rolling stock had many of the attributes of contemporary tramcars, and were designed to be regaugeable to metre gauge as there was a (never realised) plan to integrate the line with the Zurich tram network.

In 1932 the management of the Sihltal line took over the management of the Uetliberg line, but the two companies remained in existence until 1973, when they were merged to form the Sihltal Zürich Uetliberg Bahn.

In 1990, the two lines were extended from their previous joint terminus at Selnau to a terminus at Zürich HB. This extension involved the construction of a new rail tunnel from Selnau to Zurich HB, and a new underground intermediate station adjacent to the former terminus. The underground platform and tracks used at Zurich HB were already in existence, having been built prior to 1973 for a U-Bahn scheme that was ultimately rejected by voters. Once the new extension had been opened, the former terminus at Selnau was redeveloped and little evidence of it is now visible.

Until 2008, a train of the line's original 1923 rolling stock was kept as a museum train by the SZU. However an increase in train frequencies in that year meant that the possibilities of running the stock was much reduced, and depot capacity was at a premium. The train, made up of motor car 2 and trailer C41, has since been loaned to the Swiss Transport Museum in Lucerne.

A project to convert the line from 1200 V DC to 15 kV AC was completed in August 2022.

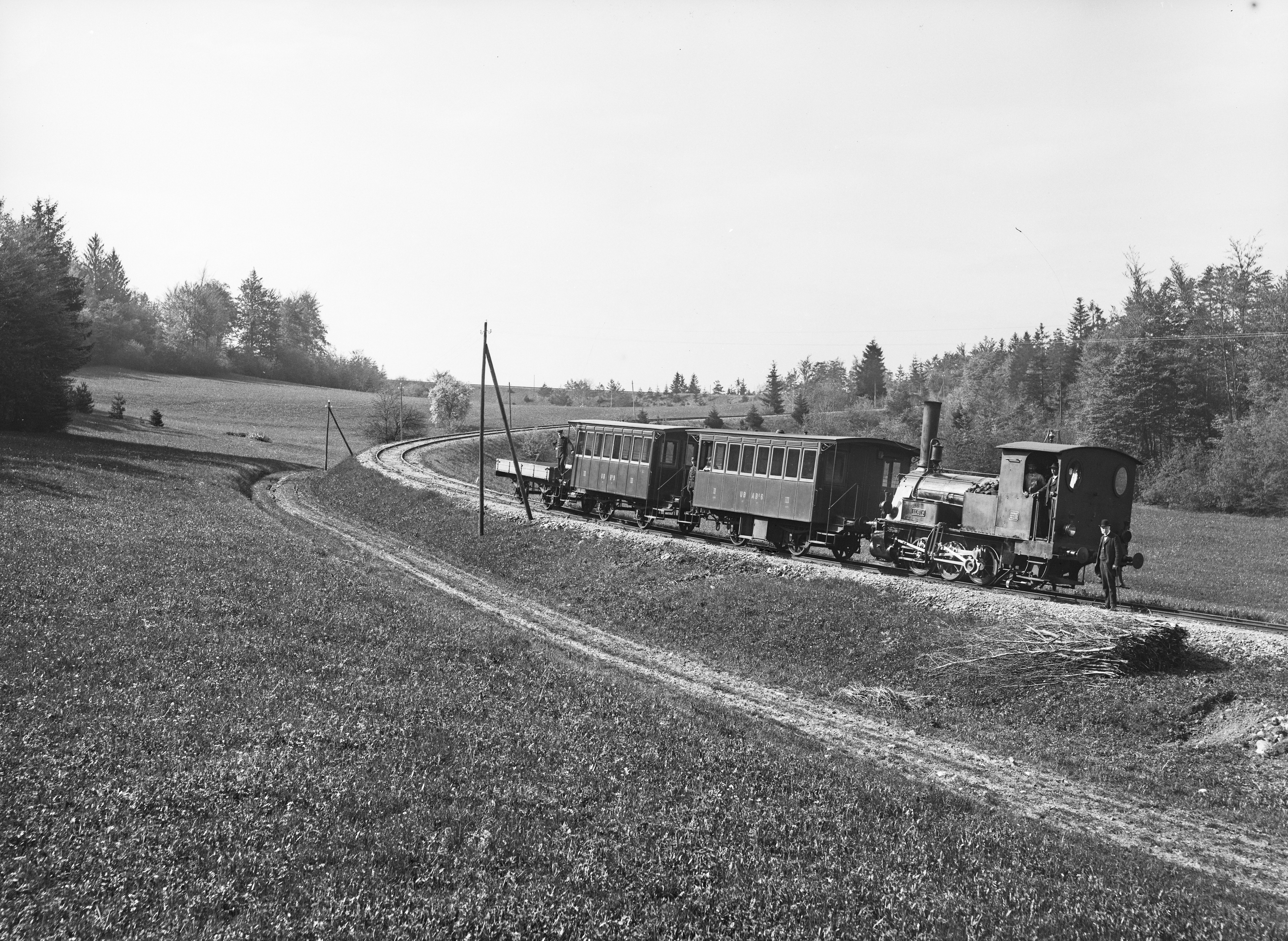
Steam traction on the line in 1910

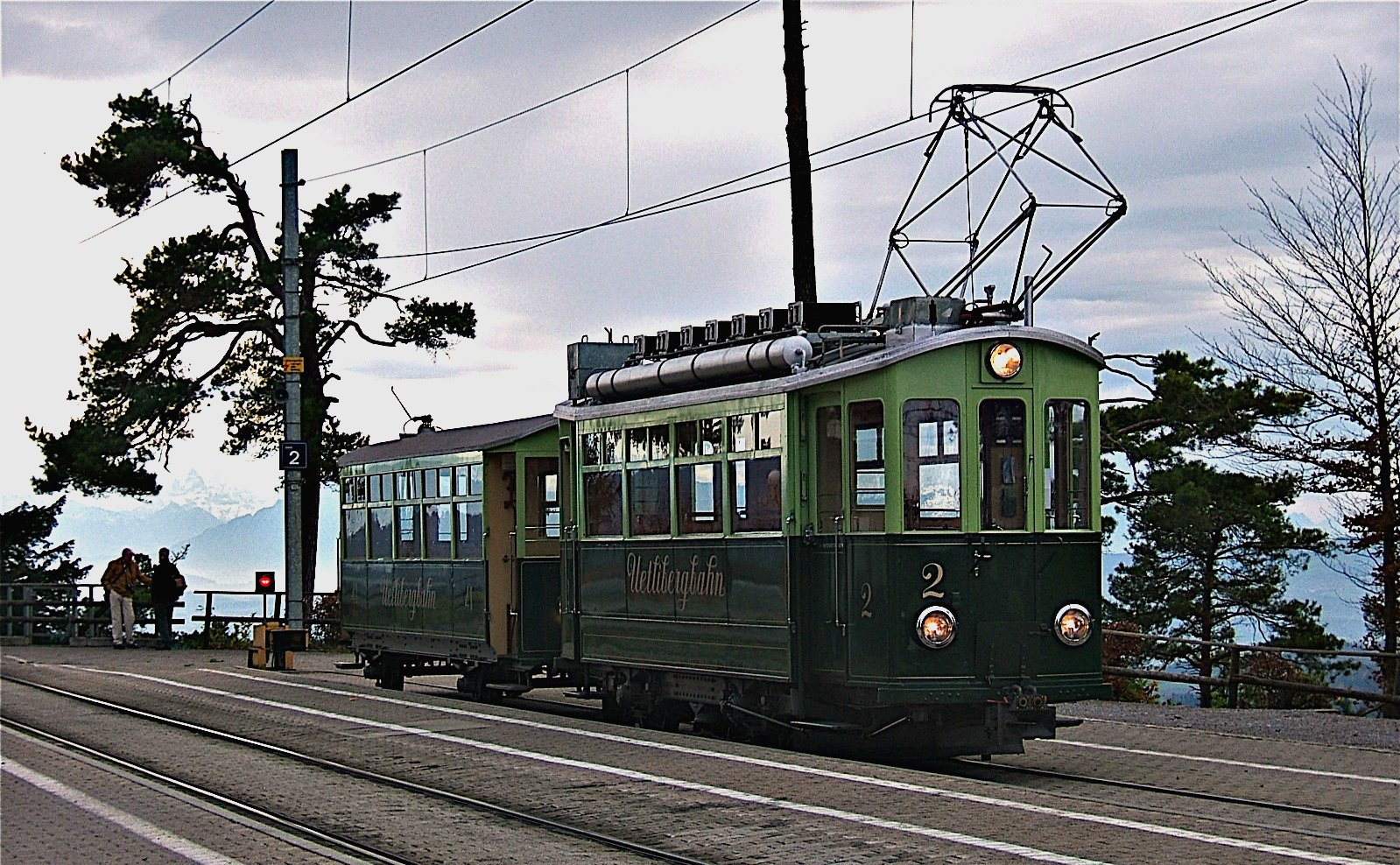
Cars 2 and C41 at Uetliberg in 2008

== Operation (S10) ==
S10
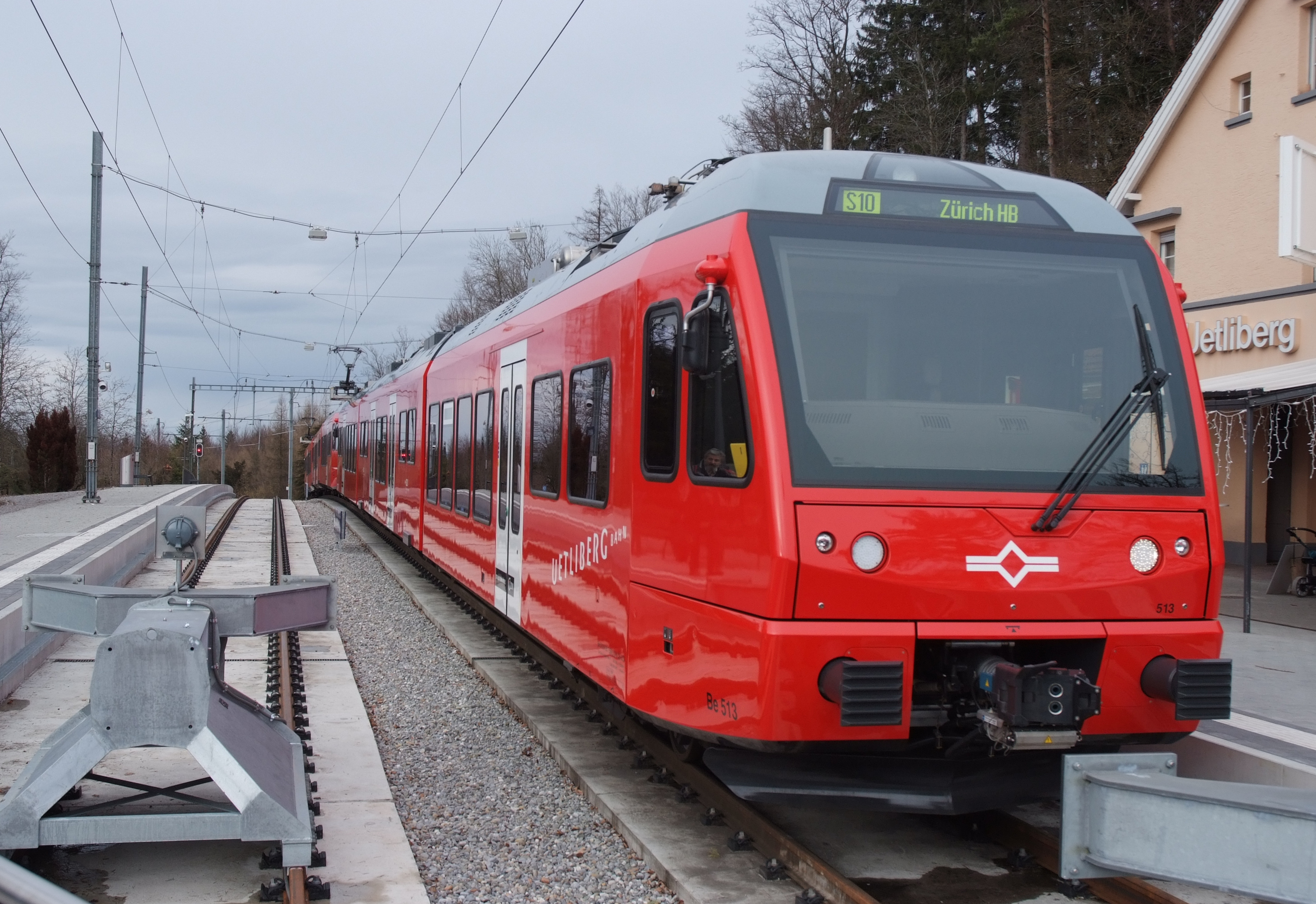
- A pair of the new dual voltage units at Uetliberg

Overview
- Service type: Zurich S-Bahn service
- Current operator: SZU

Route
- Termini: Zürich HB SZU; Uetliberg
- Stops: 10
- Service frequency: Every 20 minutes

Technical
- Rolling stock: Class Be 510 EMUs

Zürich S-Bahn network as of December 2018

=== Route ===
The Uetliberg line shares a common terminus with the Sihltal line, utilising a dedicated underground island platform (tracks 21 and 22) at Zürich Hauptbahnhof station. There is no rail connection to the rest of the station, but the platform is served by the same complex of pedestrian subways and subterranean shopping malls that link the station's other platforms.

From Hauptbahnhof to Zürich Giesshübel station the two lines share a common twin-track line, initially in tunnel, partly running along and under the Sihl river. The current Selnau station is located in this under-river tunnel section.

Although the two lines diverge at Giesshübel station, and the depot for Uetliberg trains is located there, Uetliberg line trains do not stop. Just beyond Giesshübel, the line serves Zürich Binz station. The line then commences a long, steep but relatively straight climb through the Zurich suburbs, serving the stations of Zürich Friesenberg, Zürich Schweighof and Zürich Triemli. This section of line is single track, with a double track section between Binz and Friesenberg.

Triemli station is adjacent to the Triemli Hospital, one of Zurich's main hospitals, and is the terminus for some trains on the line. The station previously had two tracks and two platforms. Due to accessibility requirements, the island platform and the second track were removed in 2018.

Beyond Triemli the line enters a more wooded and hilly environment, and executes a broad, U-shaped route to the summit of Uetliberg, which is 5.9 km (3.7 mi) from Triemli by rail, but only 1.5 km (0.93 mi) away in a direct line. This section of line serves Uitikon Waldegg and Ringlikon stations, and is single track, with double track sections between Triemli and Uitikon Waldegg, and at Ringlikon.

Uetliberg station lies some 650 m (2,130 ft) from, and 56 m (184 ft) below, the summit of the Uetliberg. The station has two terminal tracks, and a substantial station building, including a restaurant.

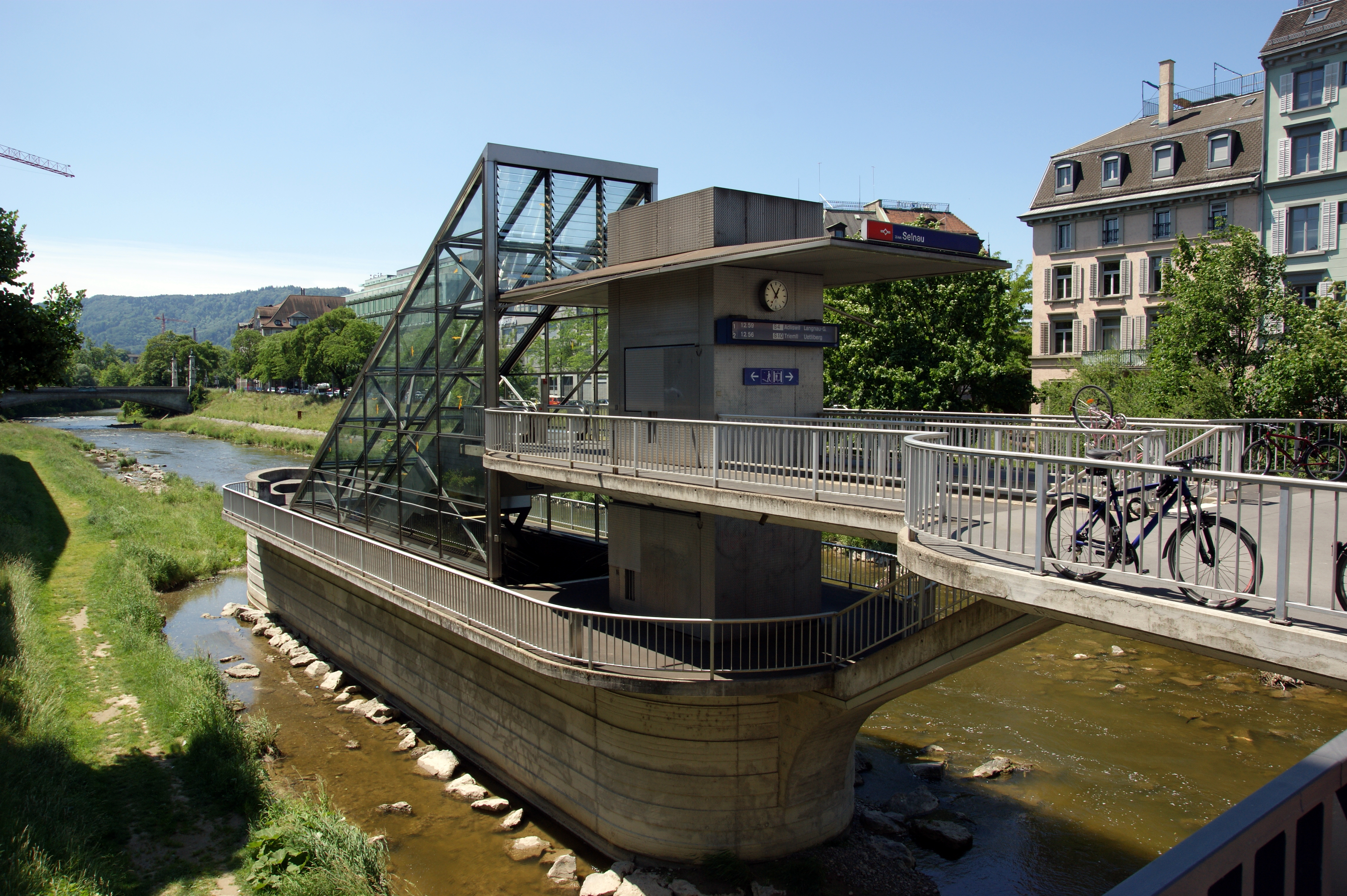
Access to Selnau via this structure in the Sihl river

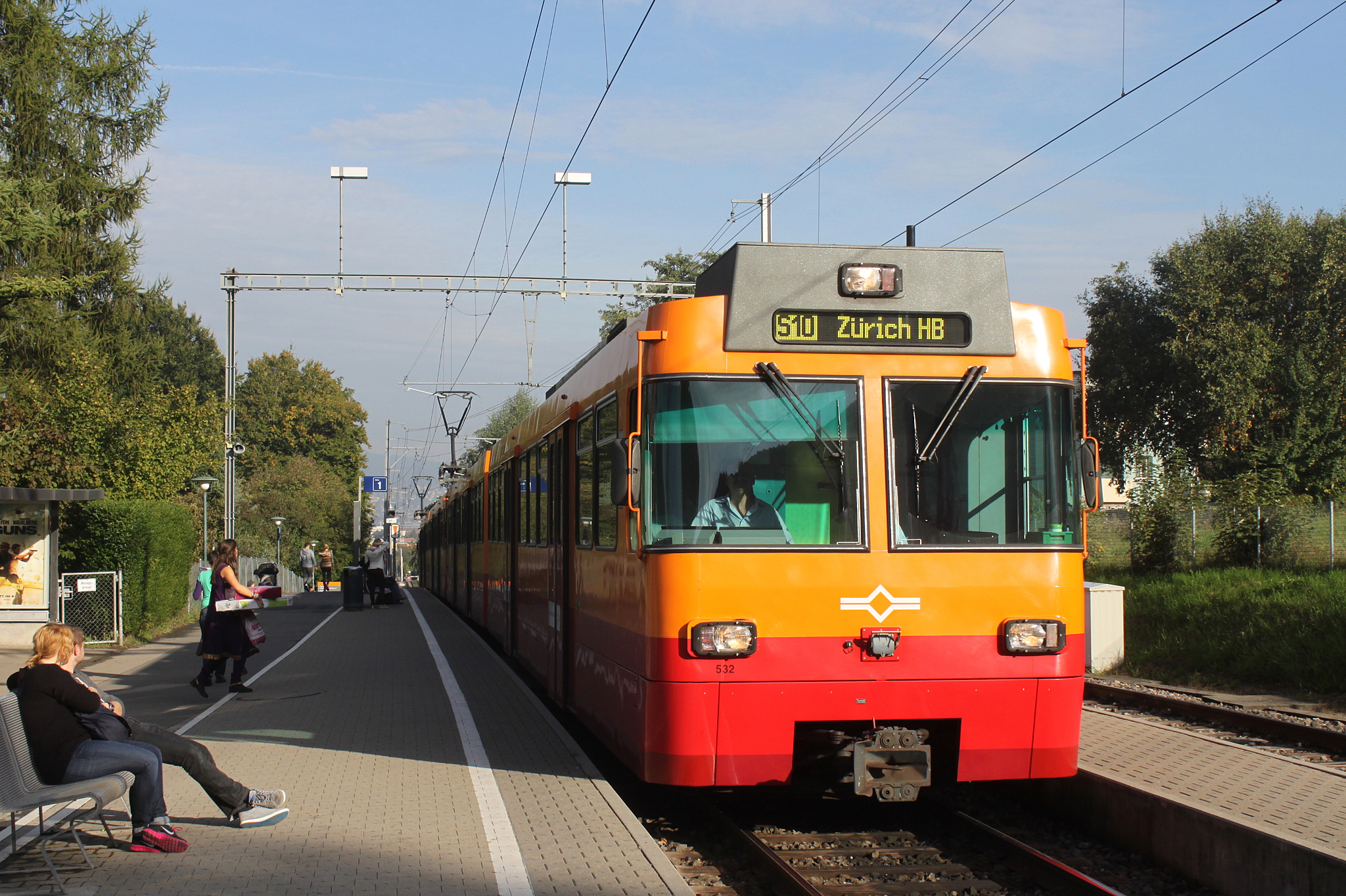
Now expired Be 556 532 of SZU at Triemli

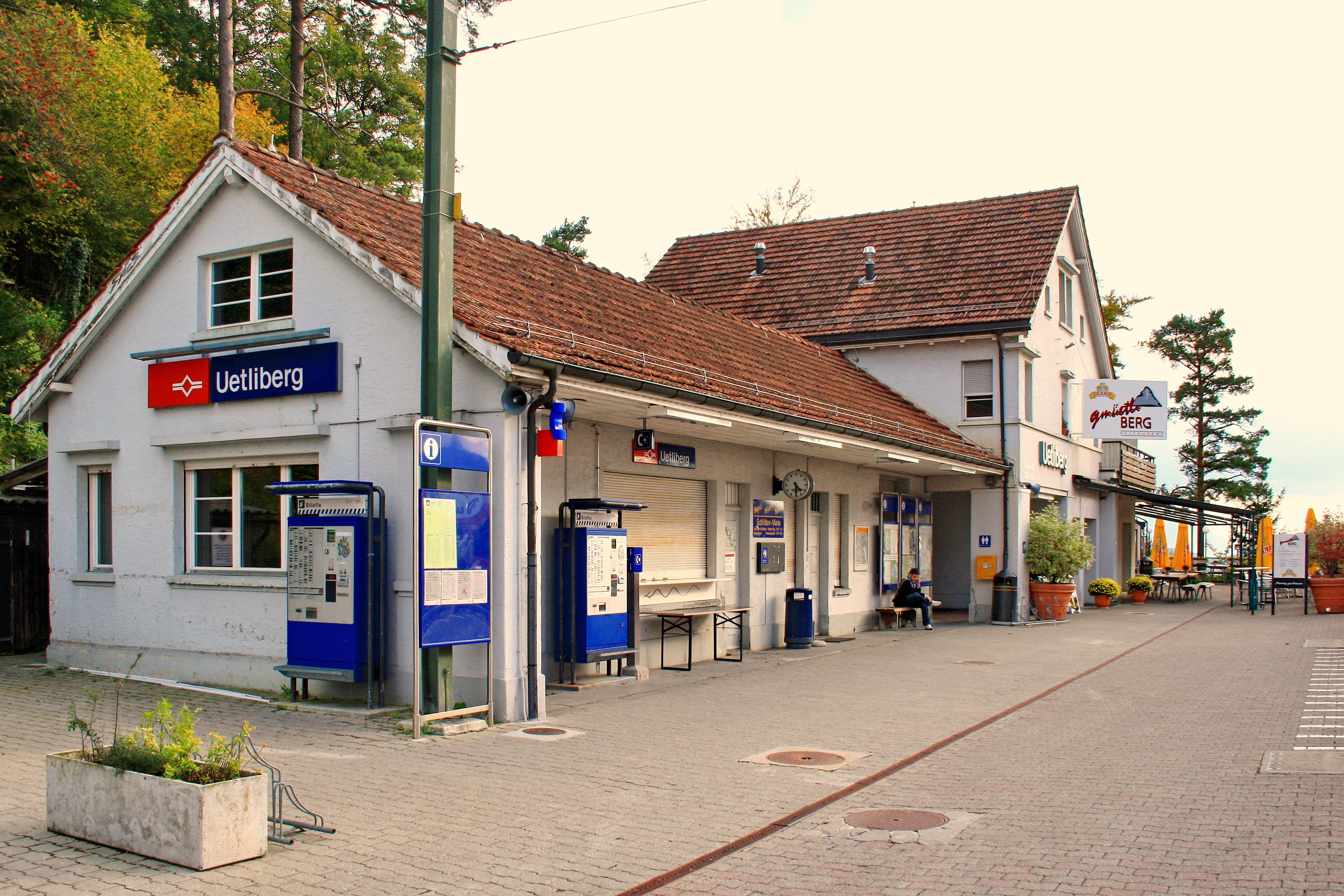
Station buildings on Uetliberg

=== Services ===
- S10 Zürich HB–Zürich Triemli–Uetliberg

The passenger services on the line now forms part of the Zurich S-Bahn, branded as the S10. Standard Zürcher Verkehrsverbund (ZVV) zonal fare tariffs apply to the line. On working days, trains run every 30 minutes from Hauptbahnhof to Uetliberg, with a more frequent shuttle service between Hauptbahnhof and Triemli. On Saturdays, Sundays and public holidays, trains run the full length of the line every 20 minutes. A journey over the full length of the line takes 20 minutes.

=== Infrastructure ===
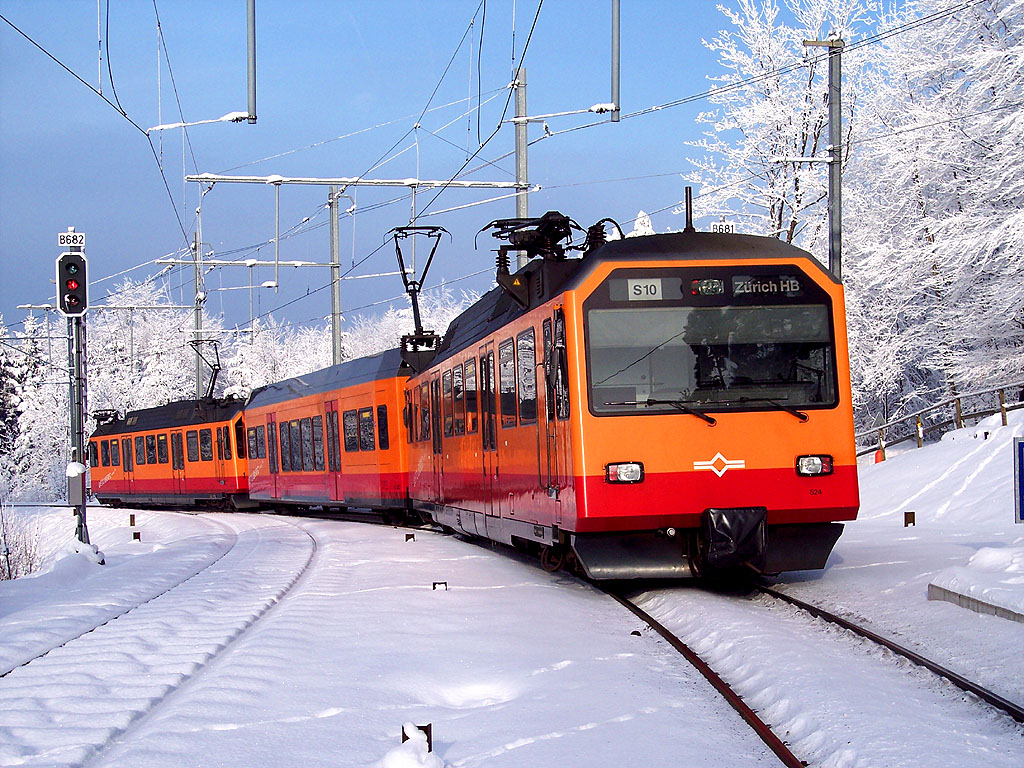
Be 556 524 of the Uetlibergbahn in the snow. The offset overhead line and pantograph can be seen.

The Uetliberg line is constructed to standard gauge and uses overhead lines for electrification. Both it and the Sihltal line, with which it shares right-of-way between Zürich HB SZU and Zürich Giesshübel, are electrified at 15 kV AC.

Prior to August 2022 the Uetliberg line used 1200 V DC. To allow both lines to operate over the shared section, the Uetliberg line used an overhead line offset from the centre of the track, and its cars were equipped with specially designed pantographs to collect from this.

=== Rolling stock ===
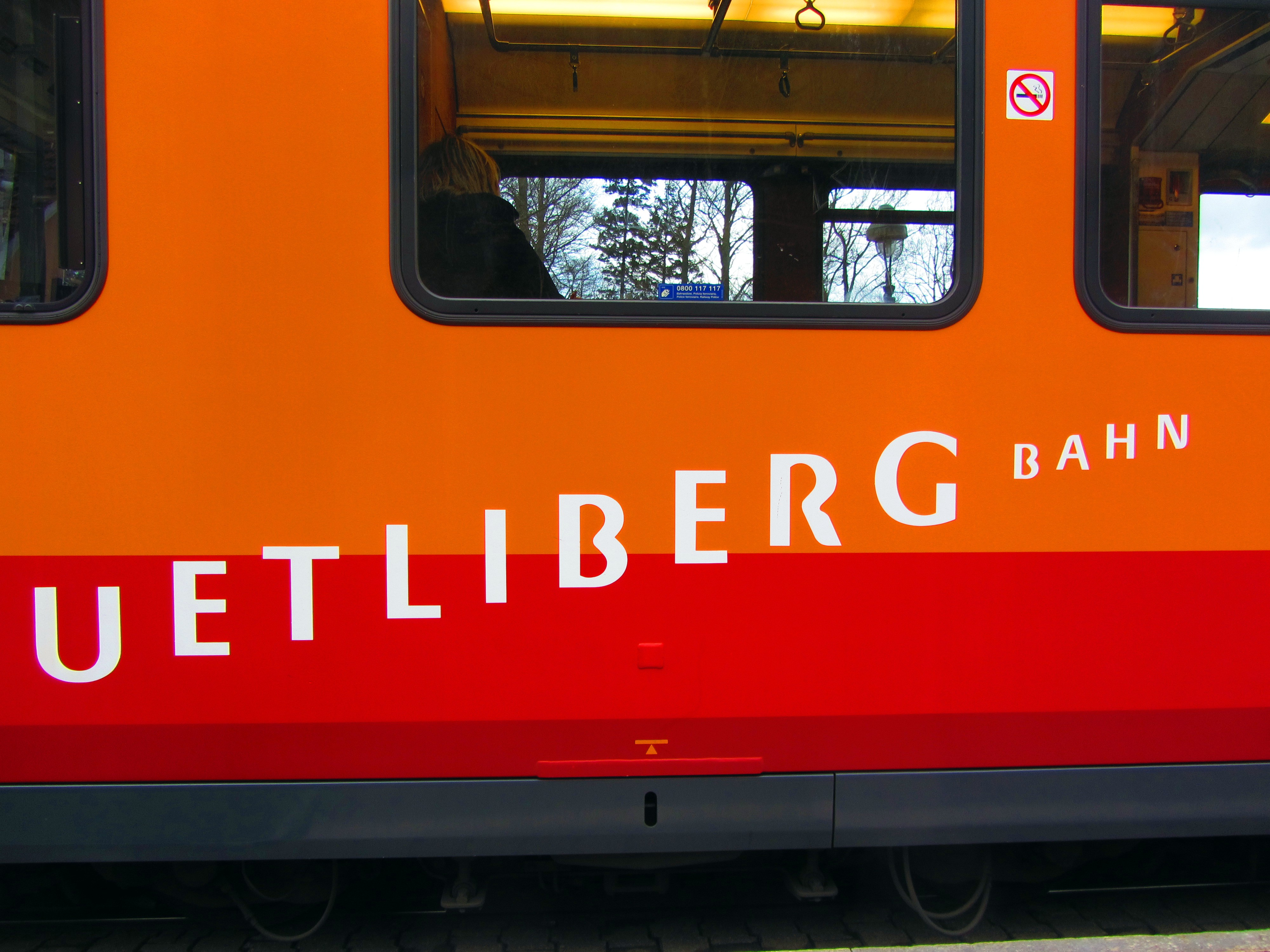
The line's branding makes play on its gradient

The Uetliberg railway's DC electrification system requires its own fleet of DC equipped trains. Until about 2014 most of the trains were operated by three car sets, with two Be 4/4 motor coaches from the series 521–528 sandwiching a low floor intermediate trailer. The two older Be 8/8 cars 31 and 32, with no low floor access, were used for short workings, reversing at Triemli station.

In 2010, six new multiple unit trains were ordered from Stadler Rail, equipped for dual voltage operation so as to operate on both the Uetliberg and Sihltal lines. By August 2013, the first of these units was on trial on the Uetlibergbahn, and by May 2014 they were operating many of the line's services. The new trains are three-section articulated low-floor units, and are classified as Be 510. In 2016 rakes of two Be 510 work the trains to Uetliberg, the Be 8/8 sets having been scrapped in February 2016 whilst the Be 4/4 521–528 sets having been retired in April 2022.

== See also ==
- Hakone Tozan Line
- List of steepest gradients on adhesion railways
- Rail transport in Switzerland
- List of railway stations in Zurich
- Public transport in Zurich
- ZVV fare zones
