= Trams in Zurich =

Overview of the tram system of Zurich, Switzerland

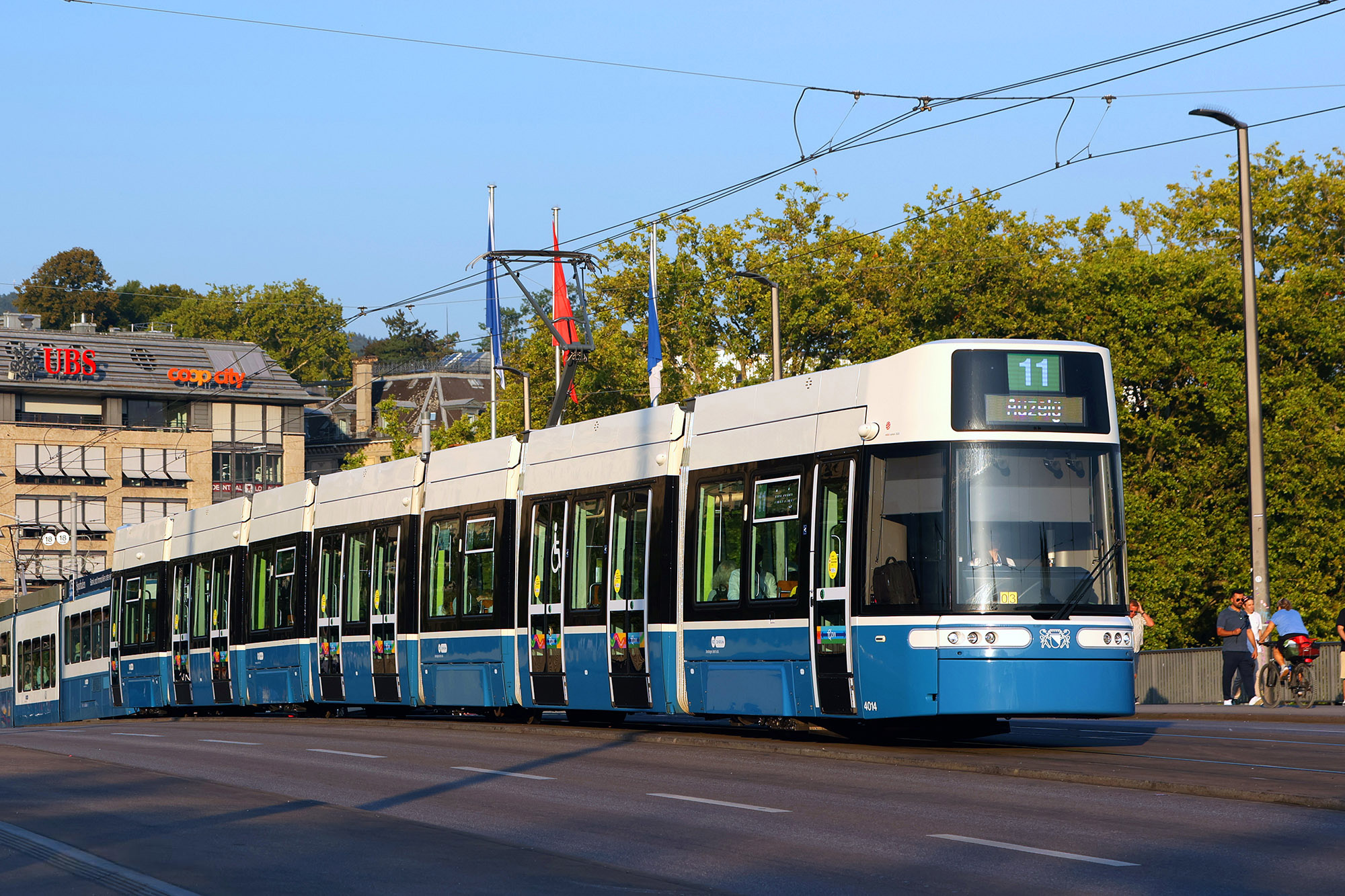
- A Bombardier Flexity Be 6/8 tram on route 11

Operation
- Locale: Zurich
- Open: 1882 (144 years ago)
- Status: Operational
- Lines: 18
- Owner: City of Zurich
- Operator: Verkehrsbetriebe Zürich

Infrastructure
- Track gauge: 1,000 mm (3 ft 3 3/8 in) metre gauge
- Propulsion system: Electric
- Electrification: 600 V DC overhead
- Stock: 258

Statistics
- Track length (double): 72.9 km (45.3 mi)
- Track length (total): 171.9 km (106.8 mi)
- Route length: 118.7 km (73.8 mi)
- Passengers in 2025: 191,500,000
Overview
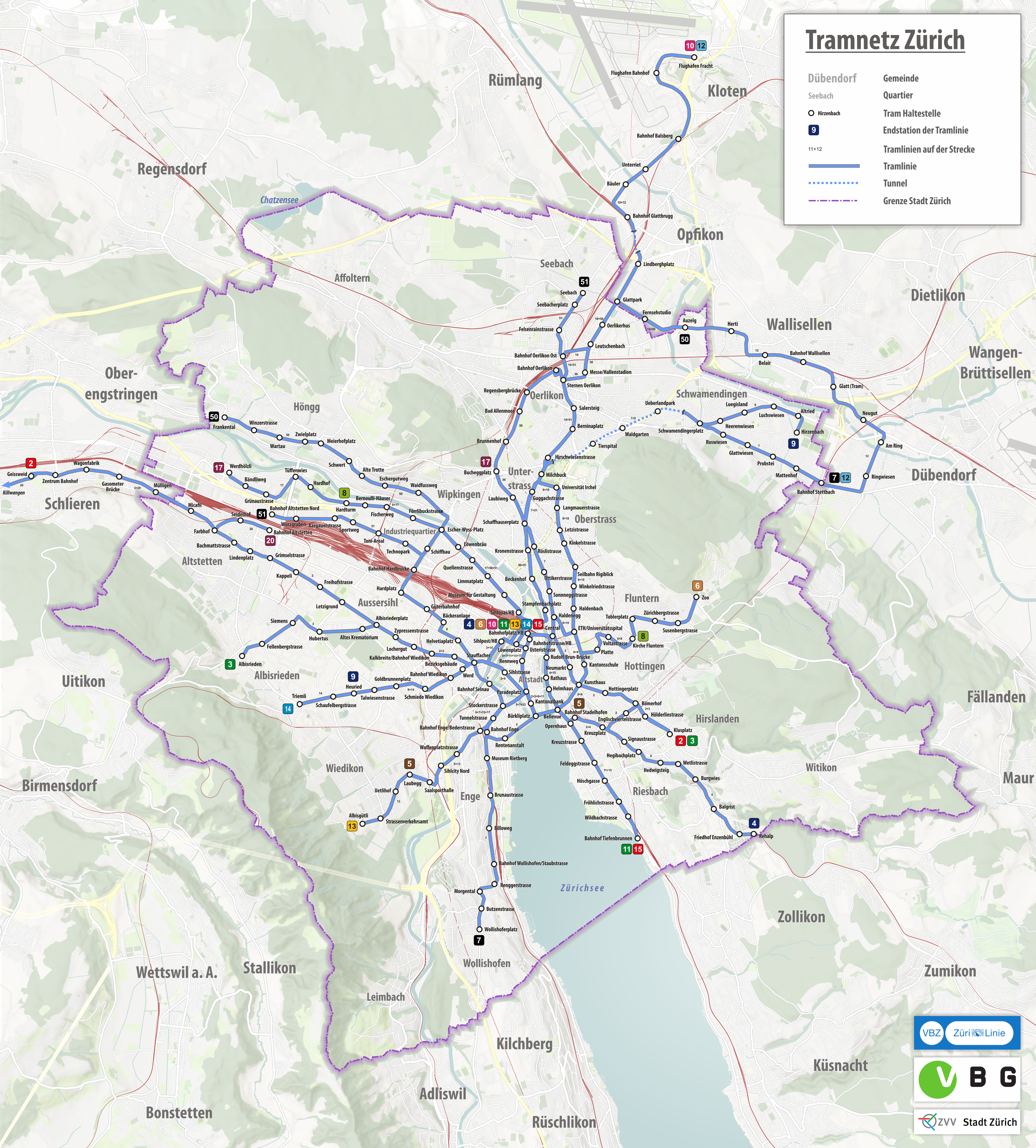
- Website: www.stadt-zuerich.ch/vbz

Trams make an important contribution to public transport in the city of Zurich in Switzerland. The tram network serves most city neighbourhoods, and is the backbone of public transport within the city, albeit supplemented by the inner sections of the Zurich S-Bahn, along with urban trolleybus and bus lines, as well as two funicular railways, one rack railway and passenger boat lines on the river and on the lake. The trams and other city transport modes operate within a fare regime provided by the cantonal public transport authority Zürcher Verkehrsverbund (ZVV), which also covers regional rail and bus services.

The city's trams are operated by the Verkehrsbetriebe Zürich (VBZ), which also manages the tramway infrastructure within the city, but the city's tram tracks are also used by three other operations. The Glattalbahn tram services to the Glattal area to the north of the city interwork with the city tram services and are also operated by the VBZ, although in this case it does so as a sub-contractor to the Verkehrsbetriebe Glattal (VBG). Trains of the independent Forchbahn (FB) light railway also use the city's tram lines to reach their city centre terminus. In 2022, the Limmattalbahn began using part of line 20.

Trams have been a consistent part of Zurich's streetscape since the 1880s, when the first horse tram ran. Electrified from the 1890s, they have seen off challenges including proposals to replace them by trolleybuses and by a metro or U-Bahn. With a relatively static city network from the 1930s to the late 1970s, the city's trams have been expanding again since then. Recent expansions have taken the network into the suburbs beyond the city boundary, covering areas it retreated from in the first part of the 20th century. Further extensions have been approved, both to the city tram network itself, and by the introduction of a new light rail system in the Limmat Valley that will interwork with the city trams.

== History ==
=== Beginnings ===
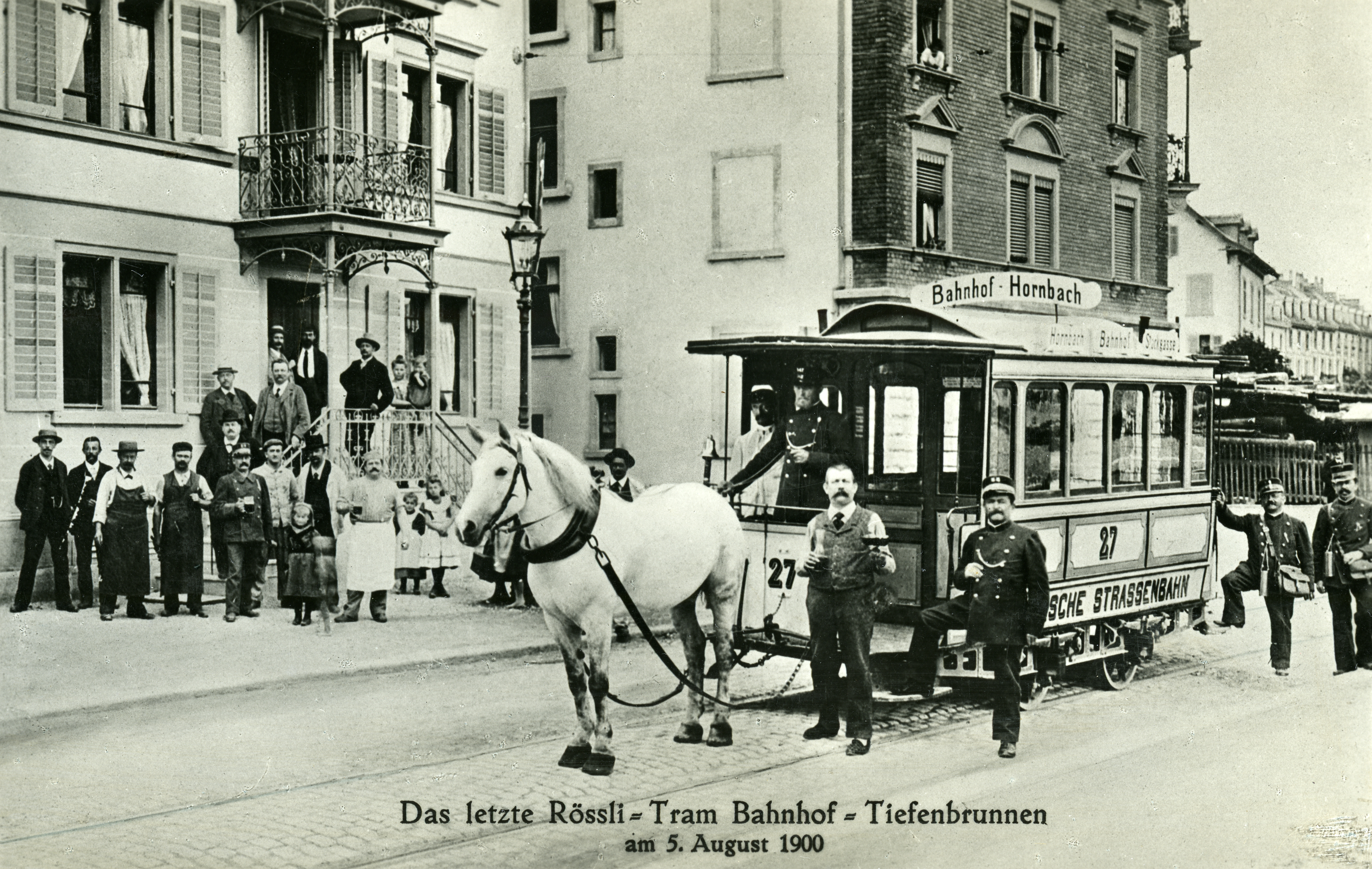
One of Zurich's horse trams in 1900

Various projects to introduce trams to Zurich were proposed from the 1860s onwards. It was not until 1882, however, that the first tram operated in the city. These initial trams were operated by the Zürcher Strassenbahn Gesellschaft (ZStG), a private company, and were of standard gauge (1,435 mm or 4 ft 8 1/2 in gauge) and horse-drawn.

By 1888 the first electric tramway in Switzerland (the Vevey–Montreux–Chillon tramway) had opened, and, in 1894, another private company, the Elektrische Strassenbahn Zürich (EStZ), started operating metre gauge (3 ft 3 3/8 in gauge) electric trams in Zurich. The EStZ only survived for two years before it was taken over by the City of Zurich, who renamed it the Städtische Strassenbahn Zürich (StStZ). The following year, the horse trams of the ZStG were acquired.

Further tramway companies were founded, some operating entirely within the city, some connecting the city with its nearer suburbs, and some running in rural areas entirely beyond the city, but still linked by connections with other lines to the city. Like the EStZ, all these lines were electrified and were built to the metre gauge. The StStZ gradually took over those companies that had significant city operations, usually closing any cross-boundary lines, whilst leaving those lines entirely beyond the city to their own devices.

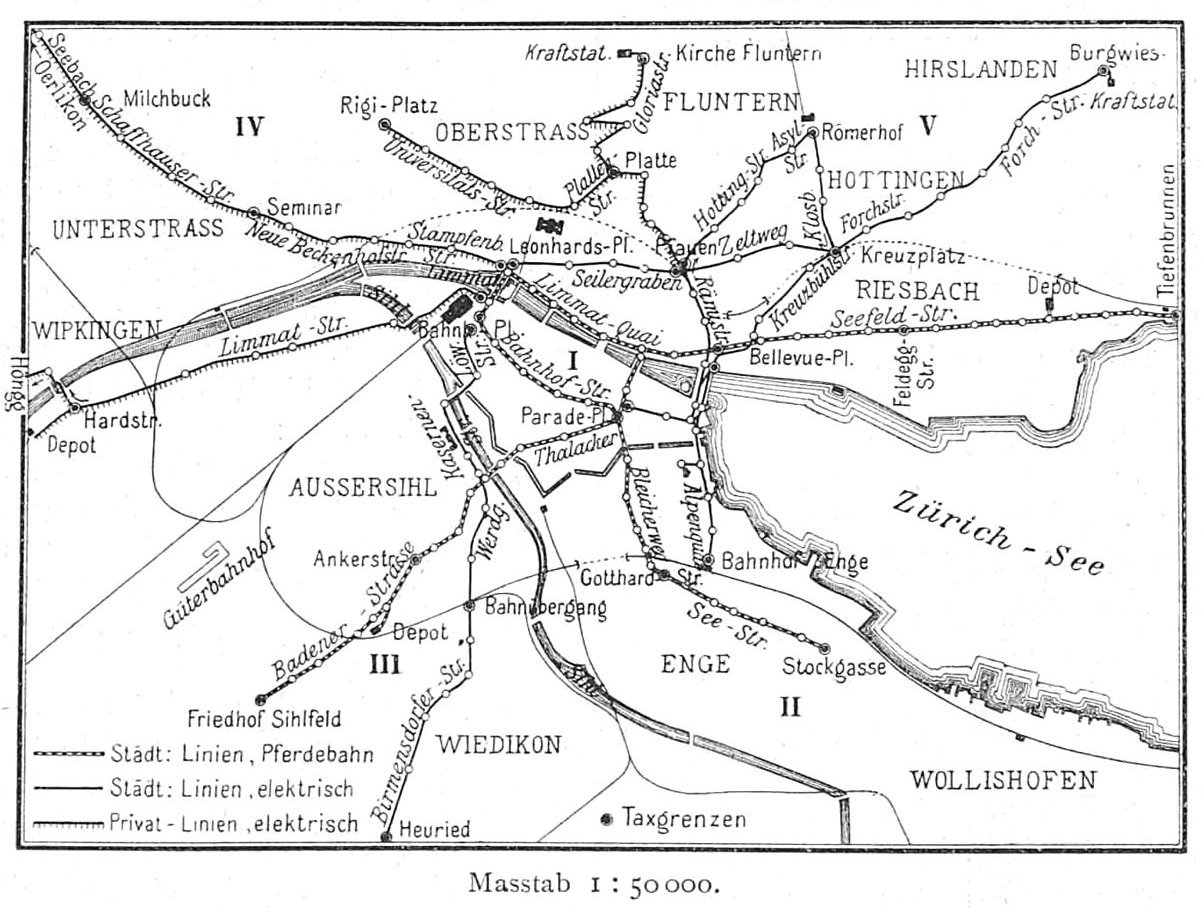
The mix of lines in 1899, distinguishing city owned (Stadt) and private (Privat), and horse (Pferdebahn) and electric (elektrisch)

=== Heyday of the StStZ ===
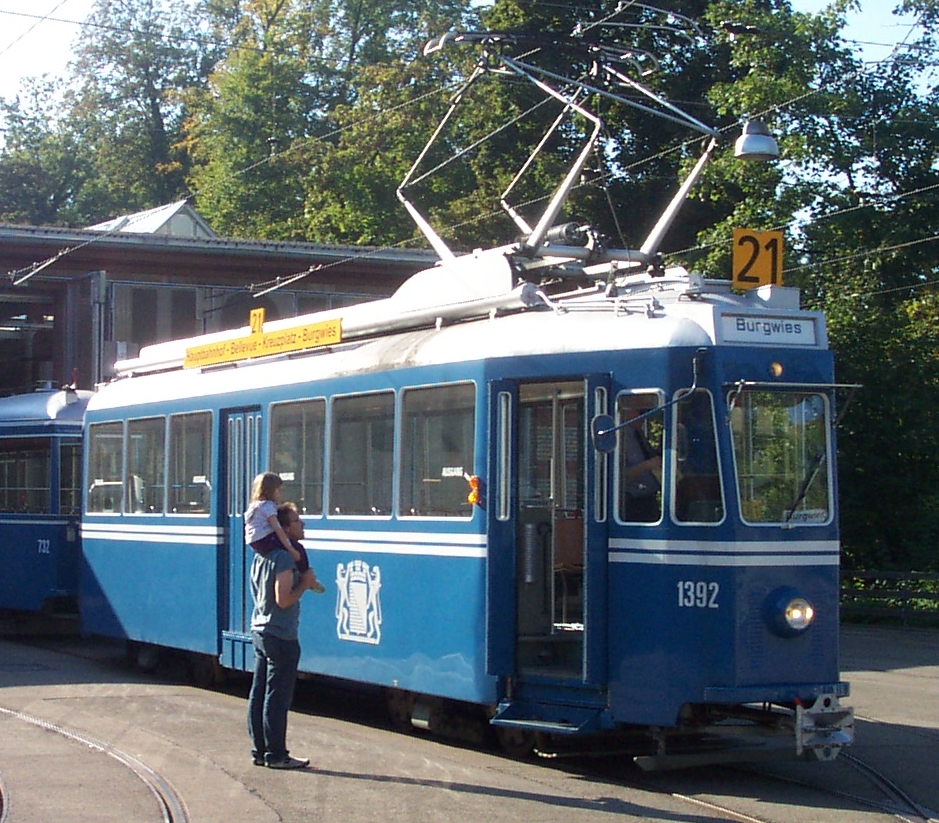
A Swiss Standard Tram, at the city's tramway museum

By the mid-1930s, the StStZ had acquired all the companies that had operated tramways within the city boundaries, with the single exception of the Dolderbahn, which had closed its short tramway in 1930. The standard gauge horse tram lines had all been converted to metre gauge and electrified. The StStZ had also built many tram extensions, resulting in a dense network of tramlines serving most city neighbourhoods.

However, in 1927, the StStZ had introduced its first motor bus line, and this was to be followed in 1939 by the first of the city's trolleybus lines. Initially these modes complemented the trams, but at various times they have threatened to replace parts of the tram system, and sometimes succeeded in doing so.

In 1940, the StStZ started a modernisation of its trams, introducing the first prototypes of the Swiss Standard Tram. Despite Switzerland's neutrality, the economic effects of the Second World War slowed down the program, but by 1953 the VBZ, as the StStZ had become in 1950, had taken delivery of 177 such trams.

=== Lines closed ===
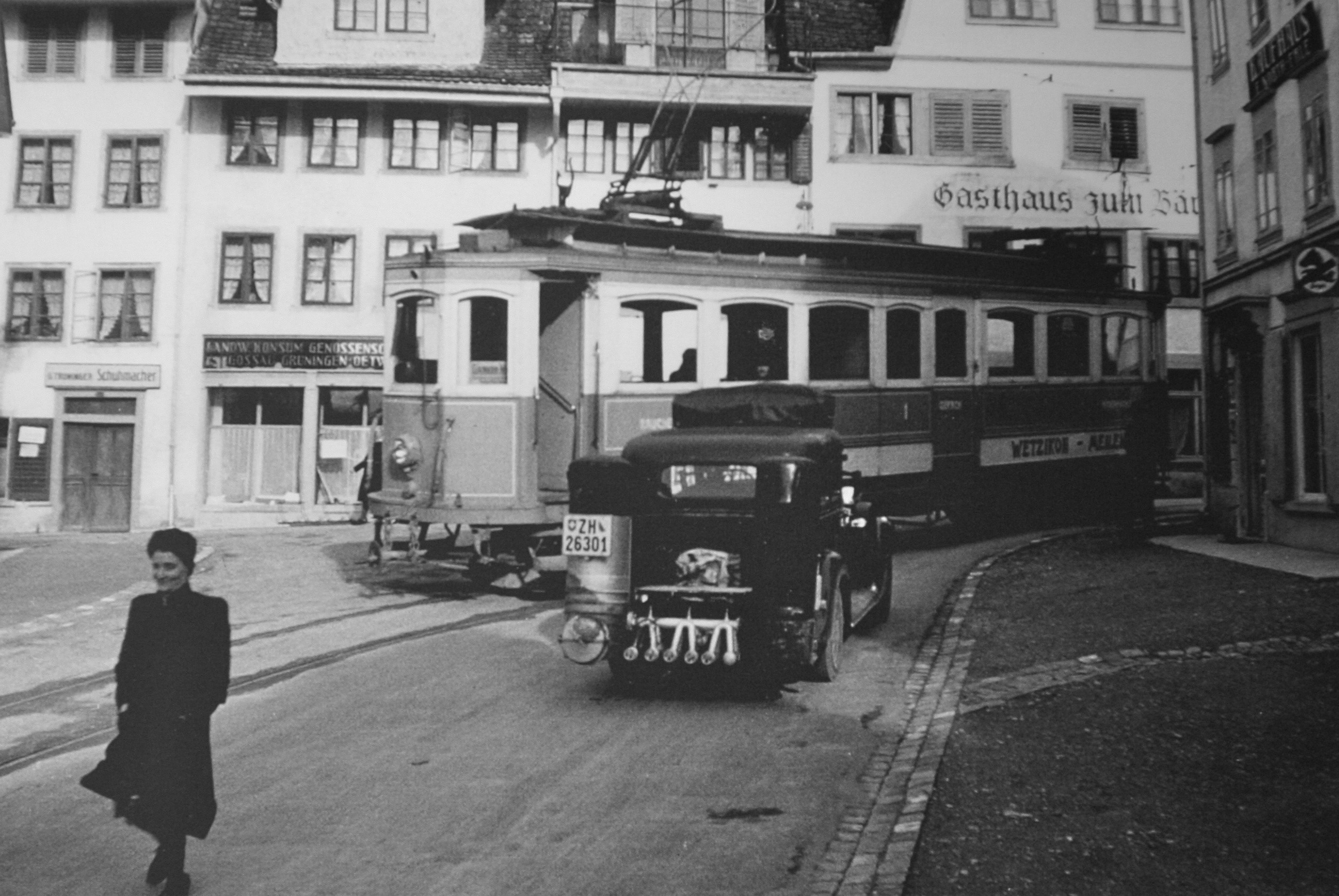
The WMB in Grüningen, prior to 1950

While the tram network within the city of Zurich has seen relatively few line closures, the same cannot be said for the lines beyond the city limits. The StStZ routinely closed any out-of-city lines belonging to the companies it took over. In other cases, private sector operated lines succumbed without StStZ involvement. Out of town closures included:

- The Schlieren to Dietikon and Schlieren to Weinigen lines of the LSB company, closed in 1928 and 1931 respectively.
- The Oerlikon to Schwamendingen and Seebach to Glattbrugg lines of the ZOS company, closed in 1931.
- The Uster to Langholz line of the UOeB company, closed in 1949.
- The Wetzikon to Meilen line of the WMB company, closed in 1950.

In the city, the initial threat to the tram came from its perceived inflexibility and susceptibility to the growing traffic congestion in the city streets. One proposed solution was the conversion of the less busy tram lines to trolleybus lines, and the first step in this direction was the conversion of tram line 1, from Burgwies to Hardplatz (1954–56). This was followed by the Farbhof to Schlieren section of line 2 (1956–58) which became a westward extension of the same trolleybus line. In practice, the trolleybus service struggled to cope with peak loadings and punctuality did not improve. No further conversions of tram lines to trolleybuses have taken place.

=== Underground proposals ===
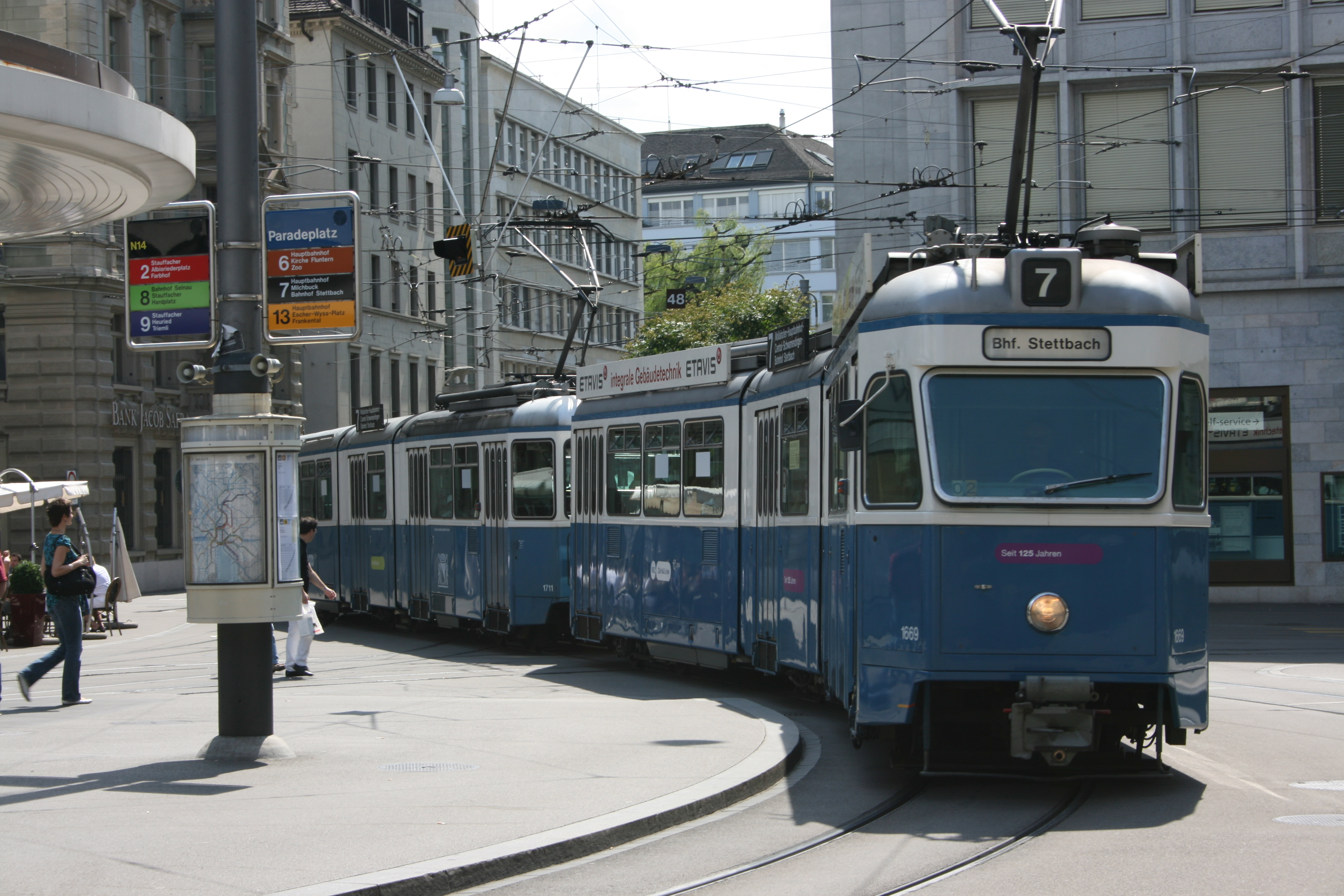
A pair of Mirage trams at Paradeplatz, operating on the surface where they were originally intended to be underground

In the 1950s, as well as proposing the conversion of less busy lines to trolleybus, plans were also made to place the busier lines in tunnels, in a form called the Tiefbahn. The recently delivered Swiss Standard trams were not seen as suitable for this, because they had doors on their tapered car ends that would not have aligned with the proposed underground station platforms. In order to overcome this limitation, several new designs of tram were introduced. The first design, known as the P16 or Karpfen, could not run on some existing routes, and only one batch of 15 motor tram and trailer pairs was built. A later design, which used articulation to avoid the problems of the P16, was eventually more successful and 126 vehicles were delivered by 1969. Instead of a Jacobs bogie it was designed with a four-wheeled centre section. This car became popularly known as the Mirage.

Despite the planning and new rolling stock, a referendum in 1962 rejected the Tiefbahn. Instead, the proponents of going underground instead proposed a full scale metro, the Zurich U-Bahn system. This would have been standard gauge and electrified using a third rail, and hence incompatible with the tram network. The lines would have extended further into the suburbs and provided faster transit times than the tramways, which would have been curtailed so as not to compete with the U-Bahn. However this would have been at the expense of a coarser grained network, with much longer distances between U-Bahn stations than between the tram stops they replaced.

In 1973, the U-Bahn proposal too was rejected in a referendum, but not before several stretches of U-Bahn tunnel had been built. One section of the putative U-Bahn has since been adapted, as described below, for use by trams, whilst another now forms the terminus of the Uetliberg and Sihltal railway lines under the Hauptbahnhof.

=== Extensions and a new model ===
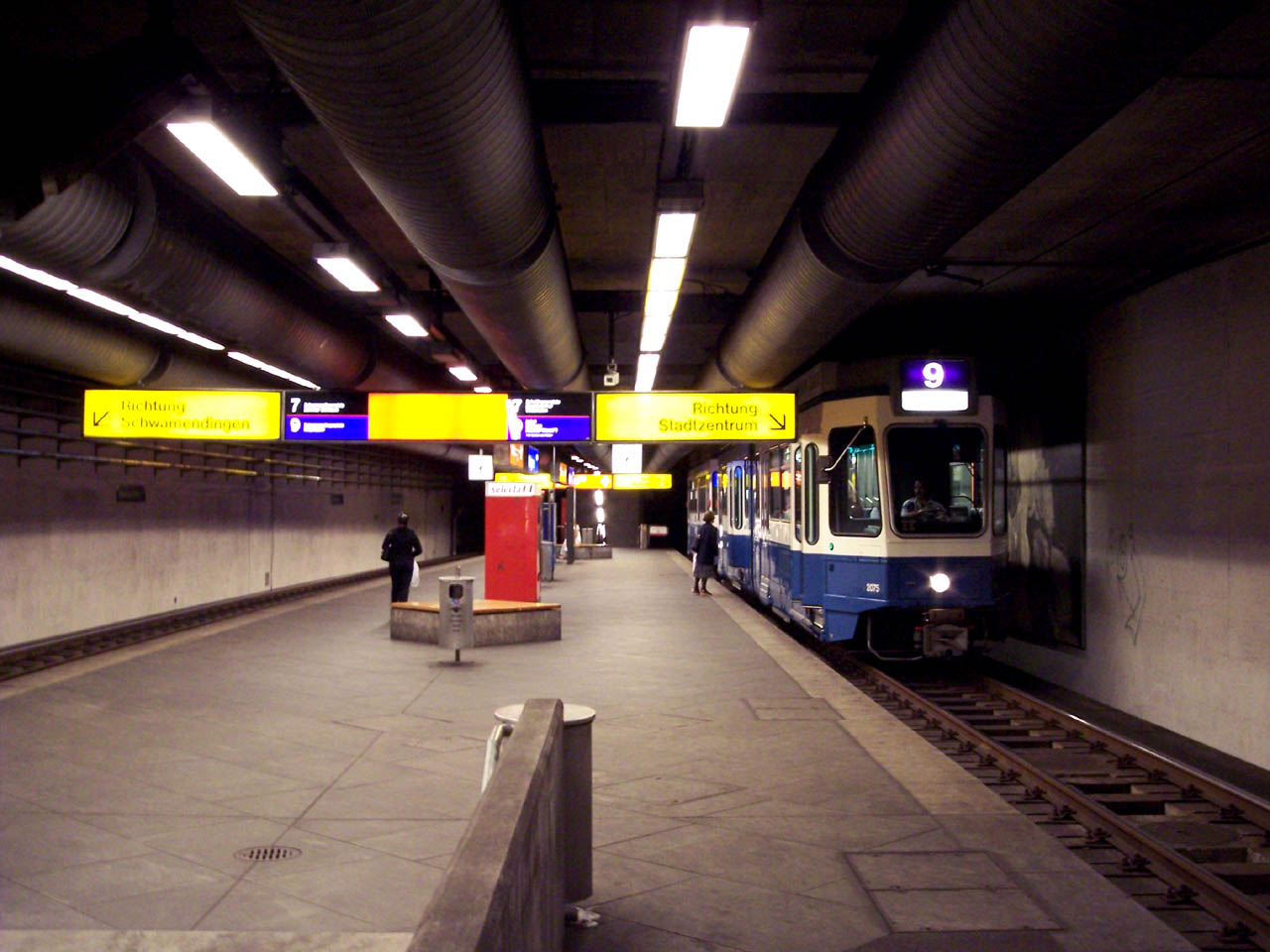
Tram 2000 tram at Waldgarten stop in the tunnel section built for the U-Bahn

In 1976, the first tram extension since 1954 took place, with the extension of line 4 from Hardturm to Werdhölzli. Unlike the older lines, this extension was built mostly on reserved track, a precedent to be followed by most subsequent extensions.

The Werdhölzli extension was followed in 1986 by the extension of lines 7 and 9 into new residential areas to the north-east of Zurich. This used one of the stretches of tunnel that had been built for the rejected U-Bahn, between Milchbuck and Schwamendingen. The tram route was extended through the tunnel before splitting at Schwamendingen to serve the area beyond, using new surface track. Because the tunnels and stations had been built with island platforms, whilst Zurich trams only have doors on their nearside, the section through the tunnel uses left-hand running.

From 1976 onwards, the VBZ tram fleet was further updated, with the introduction of Zurich's variant of the Tram 2000 design used by several Swiss tram networks. Several sub-classes of the Tram 2000 were purchased, including articulated and non-articulated variants, and some without drivers cabs that could only operate in multiple with other cars. Eventually 171 of these vehicles were delivered, with the last of the class delivered in 1992.

From the 1980s onwards, the system was increasingly acclaimed for its success in maintaining a high share of the modal split, and the Zurich model of transport provision was named after it. Beyond the tramway, the Zurich S-Bahn rail network was introduced to serve the region beyond the city boundaries, taking on some of the role that was originally planned for the U-Bahn. In 1990, the city's urban and regional transport were integrated by the introduction of the ZVV and its zone-based common fare structure.

=== Low floor trams, the Glattalbahn, and the Tram Zürich West ===
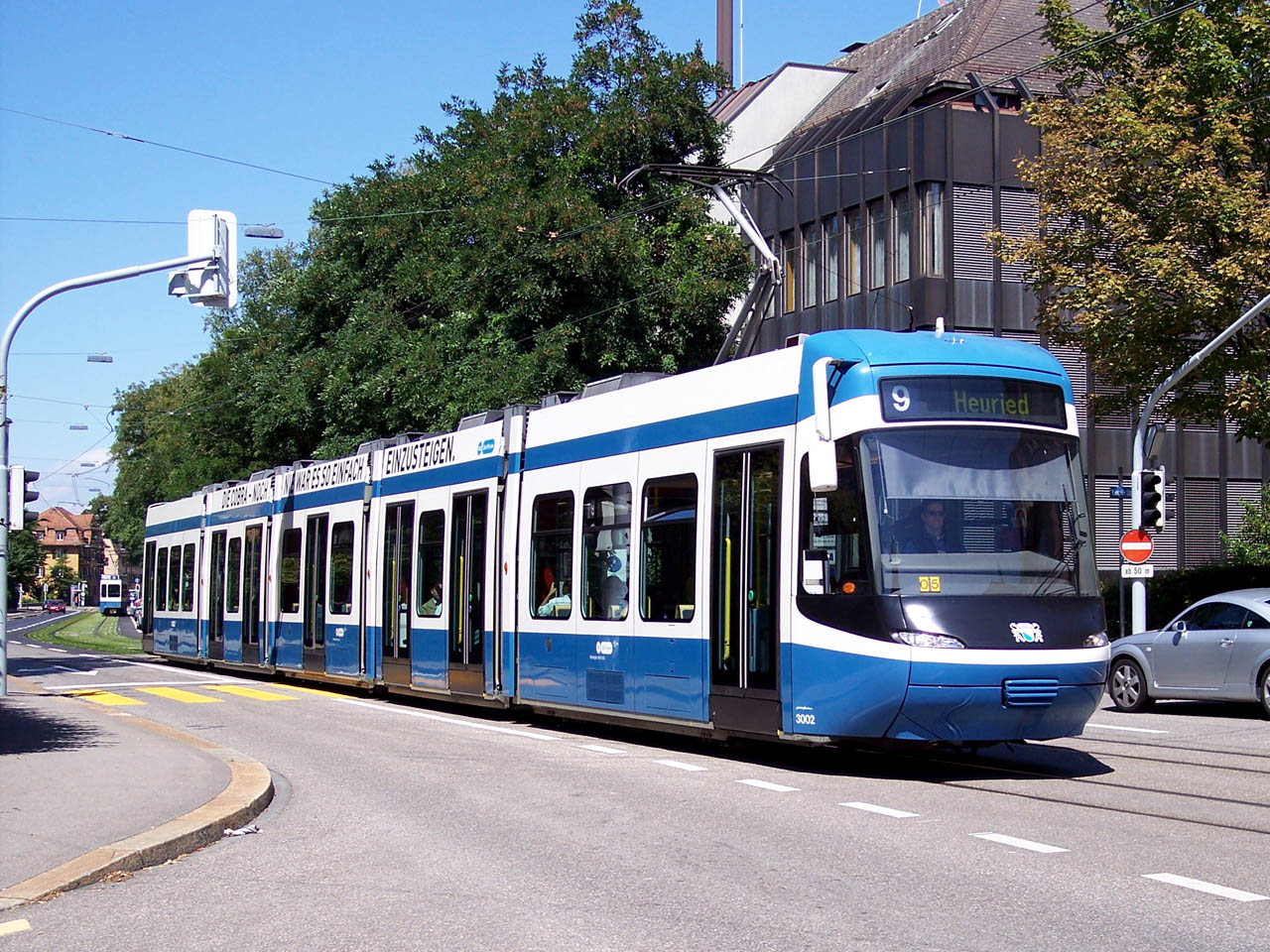
A Bombardier Cobra low-floor tram on typical VBZ street track

In 2001, the VBZ took delivery of the first prototypes of a brand-new low-floor design of tram, known as the Bombardier Cobra. Despite many teething problems with the prototypes, which were eventually extensively rebuilt, there are now 88 of these trams in service, with the last delivered in 2010. In order to increase the number of low-floor trams in service, 23 trams from the otherwise high-floor Tram 2000 fleet were rebuilt between 2001 and 2005 with the addition of a low-floor centre section.

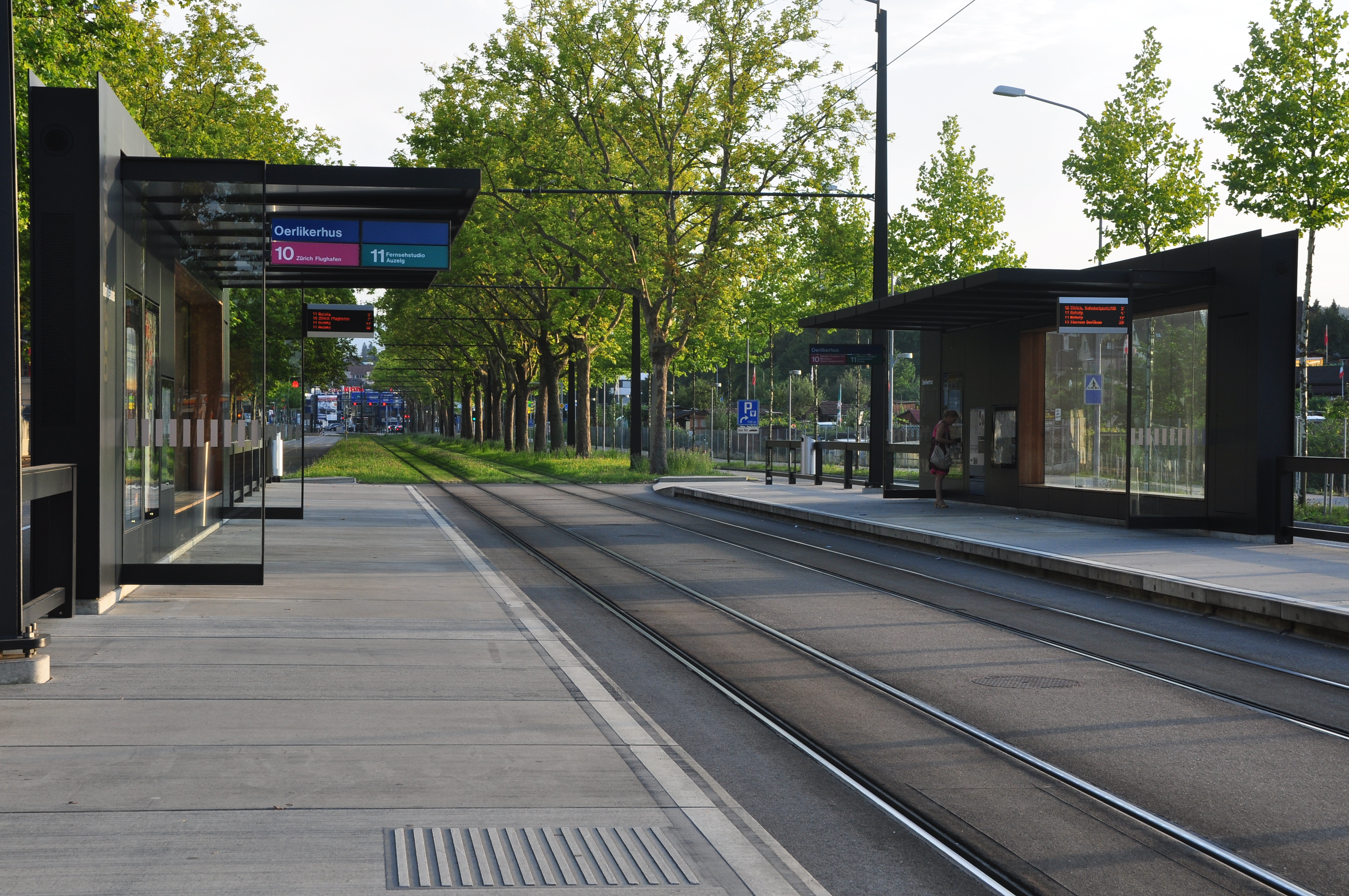
The Glattalbahn

The Glattalbahn, constructed by the responsible transport authority (the Verkehrsbetriebe Glattal or VBG) became a new light rail system as a response to urban growth. From the 1950s onwards, the Glattal region to the north of Zurich experienced a rapid boom as population and industry spilled over from nearby Zurich, partly driven by the presence of Zurich Airport. Whilst the airport is served by the city's S-Bahn rail network, the economic growth and resulting congestion led to a need for a finer-grained form of public transport. The Glattalbahn was built to be compatible with Zurich's tram network, with which it connects at several points on the city boundary. The system opened in stages between 2006 and 2010. The VBG contracted the VBZ to operate the network, and several tram lines now operate across both networks.

The arrival of new trams between 2001 and 2010 led to the retirement of older vehicles. The Karpfen last ran in regular service in 2006, and the Mirage in 2010. Many members of both classes have been transferred to Vinnytsia in Ukraine.

Tram Zürich West, an extension from Escher-Wyss-Platz to Bahnhof Altstetten Nord, in the city of Zurich, opened in December 2011. The resulting reorganisation of lines included a new line 17 from Hauptbahnhof to Werdhölzli via Escher-Wyss-Platz, and the diversion of line 4, which had previously served Werdhölzli, to Altstetten.

=== The procurement of more low floor trams ===
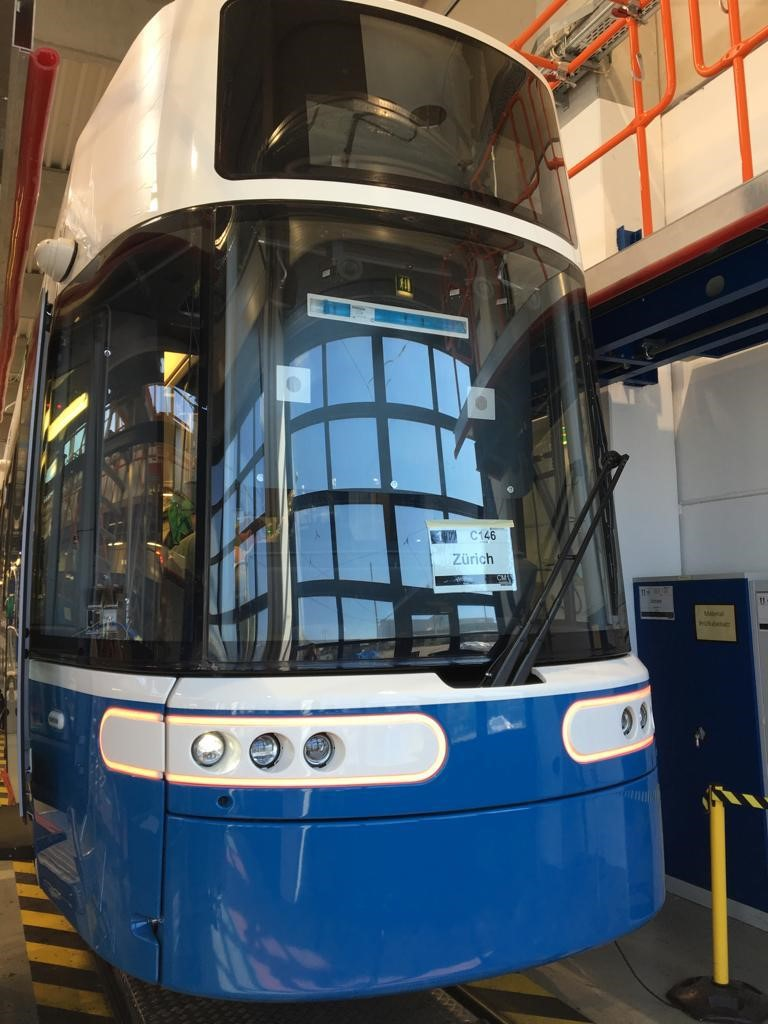
The front of the first Bombardier Flexity tram to arrive in Zurich

While delivery of the cobra occurred, the VBZ prepared to order another batch of low floor trams to replace the Tram 2000. By 2010, it had conducted trials of three existing tram types on its network. These were the Stadler Tango, the Siemens Combino and the Bombardier Flexity. by November 2012 requested tenders for the supply of 30 new trams, together with an option for the supply of a further 70 vehicles. The first trams were to be delivered in December 2016, and were to be 100% low floor with capacity for at least 225 passengers. In response, by April 2013 five suppliers had submitted bids.

By February 2015, no decision had been made as to which supplier to select, with reports of conflict between city and canton authorities.

In May 2016, it was announced that VBZ had awarded a contract worth 358 million Swiss Francs to Bombardier Transportation for the supply of 70 7-section Flexity 2 trams, with an option for a further 70, to be delivered between 2018 and 2023. The trams were 43 metres (141 ft) long and 2.4 metres (7 ft 10 in) wide, and were capable of carrying 90 seated and 186 standing passengers. Both Stadler Rail and Siemens filed complaints with the Administrative Court of the Canton of Zurich, causing the finalisation of the contract to be suspended, but the court ruled in February 2017 that VBZ could conclude the contract with Bombardier. After both Stadler and Siemens decided not to appeal this decision to the Federal Supreme Court of Switzerland, the contract was finally signed on 2 March 2017.

=== System extensions and network re-shuffling ===
In 2017, line 8 was extended from Hardplatz to Hardturm, via a new track over Hardbrücke, the first tram line to cross the main railway line through Zurich (project Tram Hardbrücke). An extension of the tracks from Hardbrücke to Bucheggplatz and Milchbuck (project Rosengartentram und Rosengartentunnel), along with the opening of two new tram lines, was rejected by a referendum in 2020, however. This project would have also included a loop tunnel for the cars between Hardbrücke and Bucheggplatz.

In September 2019, city line 2 was extended from Farbhof to Geissweid (Schlieren), a distance of 2.9 kilometres (1.8 mi) with seven stops. The new line operates over the first section of the so-called Limmatalbahn, not to be confused with the defunct Limmattal tramway, and replaces trolleybus line 31 over that section (line 31 now terminates at Hermetschloo station). The second section of the Limmattalbahn opened in December 2022. The Limmattalbahn is a light rail service (line 20) from Altstetten railway station to Killwangen-Spreitenbach railway station. It is operated by Aargau Verkehr AG (AVA).

The extension of line 2, together with a delay to the delivery of the Bombardier Flexity trams on order, required a reorganisation of other lines in order to free up trams for line 2. In addition two Mirage trams, withdrawn from service nearly ten years earlier but held in reserve, were reinstated to cover some peak workings. The first of the new Flexity trams arrived in Zurich on 13 November 2019, was not expected to enter passenger service until the summer of 2020. Service of the Flexity finally began on the 15th of October 2020.

=== Limmattal light rail line ===
In the Limmat Valley, between Bahnhof Altstetten and Bahnhof Killwangen-Spreitenbach, the Limmattal light rail line opened in December 2022, after being approved by a referendum held in November 2015. The first section of the line opened in September 2019, and this section connects to the VBZ tram system at Farbhof, the former terminus of line 2. That line has been extended over the light rail line as far as Schlieren, as a partial replacement for trolleybus line 31. The Limmattalbahn, designated route 20, is a regional light rail service between Bahnhof Altstetten and Killwangen-Spreitenbach railway station. It was announced in May 2016 that this service would be operated by BDWM (now Aargau Verkehr AG, AVA).

=== Network revision December 2025 ===
On 14 December 2025, Zurich's tram network underwent a major revision. This revision, dubbed the "biggest in the history of the VBZ", resulted from the combination of long-term network development and temporary rerouting due to construction.

The changes for the long-term network development were driven by the need for a better connection to the Lengg area, a part of the Riesbach district where many healthcare institutions are located. The expansion in this area is referred to as the Tramnetz Süd. Before the revision, only the line 11 and the Forch railway served the section Stadelhofen railway station–Rehalp railway station. With the revision, the line 4 replaced the line 11 after their intersection at Bellevue in order to create a more direct connection via Limmatquai from Zurich HB to Rehalp, and serves twice as frequently, reducing the 7.5 minute intervals to 3.75 minutes during peak times. In the future, the line 5 will be expanded beyond its new turning point in Stadelhofen to Rehalp as well, once a secondary turning loop is installed at Rehalp, and will create a new direct connect from Enge railway station to the Lengg. With the two lines running in parallel, their individual intervals will return to 7.5 minutes, but preserve the higher frequency between Stadelhofen and Rehalp by alternating.

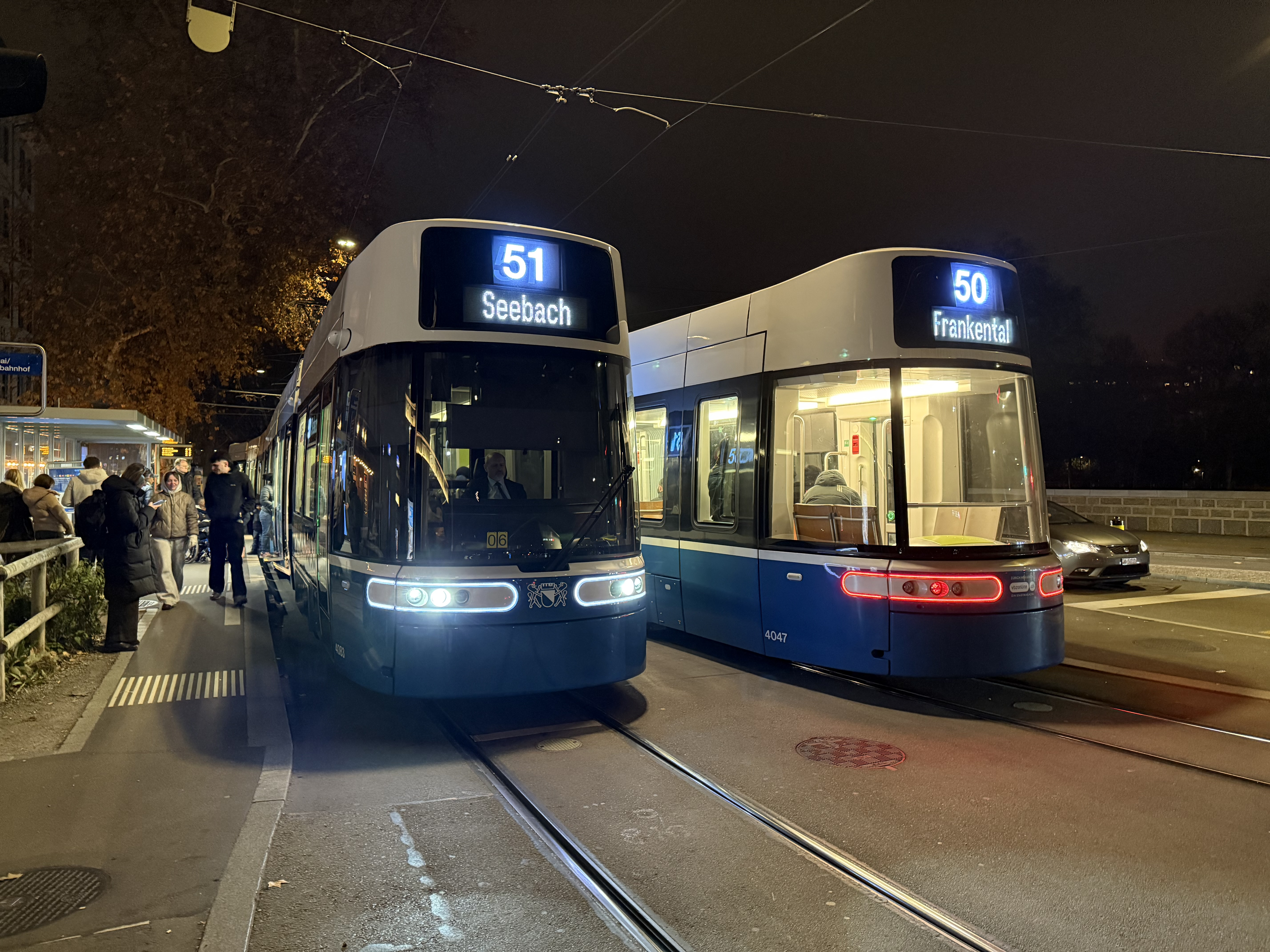
Two Bombardier Flexity trams on the temporary lines 50 and 51 in December 2025.

The construction prompting the temporary rerouting of many lines is the year-long renovation of Bahnhofquai/HB, one of Zurich's most important tram hubs. The redesign will make the tram stop accessible by raising parts of the platform for level entry. No trams are able to serve the stop during the construction. The stop will only re-enter service with the timetable change in December 2026. As a result, this temporarily disconnects most the "northern" and "southern" tram network of Zurich, with the line 7 remaining the only north-south connection for a year. In the northern network, the temporary Baulinien, 'construction lines' 50 and 51 were created to take over the disconnected parts of the lines 4, 11, 13, and 14.

=== History preserved ===
The Zurich Tram Museum, located at the former tram depot at Burgwies (on tram line 4), preserves many examples of Zurich's former tramcar fleet, along with other related exhibits.

== Current and historic operators ==
Current and historic operators of trams in and around Zurich are summarised in the table below. Names of companies whose lines were entirely outside the current city boundaries are shown in italic type. Those which still operate tram or other light rail services are shown in bold type.

Company	Abbreviation	From	Until	Absorbed by	Notes
Zürcher Strassenbahn Gesellschaft	ZStG	1882	1897	StStZ	The private company that opened Zurich's first tramway, using horse-drawn standard gauge (1,435 mm or 4 ft 8 1/2 in gauge) trams.
Elektrische Strassenbahn Zürich	EStZ	1894	1896	StStZ	The first electric tram operator, and the first to use metre gauge (3 ft 3 3/8 in gauge). Bought by the City of Zurich, and renamed the StStZ.
Zentrale Zürichbergbahn	ZZB	1895	1905	StStZ	Constructed two electric tramways from near the current Kunsthaus to the Kirche Fluntern and to the lower terminus of the Rigiblick funicular. Their trams operated through to Paradeplatz over StStZ tracks, and were eventually acquired by that company.
Städtische Strassenbahn Zürich	StStZ	1896	1950	VBZ	Formed by the City of Zurich to buy the EStZ. The city owned company continued to acquire other tram operators, until by 1931 it owned all the remaining tramways within the city. In 1950, renamed as the VBZ.
Strassenbahn Zürich-Oerlikon-Seebach	ZOS	1897	1931	StStZ	Constructed a tram route from Leonhardsplatz (now known as Central) to Oerlikon and Seebach via Stampfenbachstrasse and Schaffhauserstrasse. Later additions included an extension from Seebach to Glattbrugg, and a route from Oerlikon to Schwamendingen. An early connection to the StStZ network was soon removed, and the ZOS operated independently of the city trams until the company was taken over by them in 1931. At the same time, the Oerlikon to Schwamendingen and Seebach to Glattbrugg lines were closed.
Industriequartier-Strassenbahn Zürich	IStB	1898	1903	StStZ	Constructed a tram route from Bahnhofquai to Escher-Wyss-Platz. At Escher-Wyss-Platz, connection was made with the StZH route to Höngg, and initially cars ran through from Bahnhofquai to Hongg. However this ceased after 1901, and passengers needed to change trams and rebook at Escher-Wyss-Platz. The company was taken over by the StStZ in 1903, after which through running to Hongg resumed.
Strassenbahn Zürich–Höngg	StZH	1898	1923	StStZ	Constructed a tram route from Escher-Wyss-Platz, with connection to the IStB line to Bahnhofquai, via Wipkingen to Hongg. The line was acquired by the StStZ in three phases; firstly in 1907 when the bridge over the Limmat river to Wipkingen was replaced, then in 1913 when the line as far as Grenzstein Honng was acquired, and finally in 1923 when the rest of the line as far as the terminus at the Wartau depot was acquired.
**Dolderbahn**	Db	1895			From 1899, the Dolderbahn company operated an electric tram between the upper station of the Dolderbahn (then a funicular) and the Dolder Grand Hotel. This line never had any track connection with any other tram line, and was replaced by a bus in 1930. In 1973 the Dolderbahn was converted to a rack railway and extended to the Dolder Grand, thus replacing the bus.
Limmattal Strassenbahn	LSB	1900	1931	StStZ	Constructed an interurban line from the former Zurich city boundary at Letzigraben, via Altstetten (Farbhof) and Schlieren to Dietikon, together with a branch from Schlieren to Weiningen. A connection with the StStZ was made at Letzigraben. The line between Schlieren and Dietikon closed in 1928, whilst that Schlieren and Weiningen closed in 1931, at the same time as the rest of the line from Letzigraben to Schlieren were acquired by the StStZ.
Bremgarten-Dietikon-Bahn	BD	1902	2000	BDWM	Originally constructed as a rural tramway between Bremgarten and Dietikon to the west of Zurich. Although well outside the city of Zurich, it was at one time indirectly connected to the city's tramways by the LSB, which also served Dietikon. The section between Bremgarten and Wohlen was originally a standard gauge steam operated railway, which was converted to mixed gauge and taken over by BD in 1912.
Albisgütlibahn	AGB	1907	1925	StStZ	The last privately owned tramway to be built within the city was built to connect the city tramway at Giesshübelstrasse to the site of the federal shooting festival, held at Albisgüetli in July 1907. Lack of traffic to this, then very rural, location after the festival finished caused the line financial troubles, and in 1913 the line sold three of its five trams to the StStZ. By 1915 the line was operating only on Sundays, and in 1925 the StStZ took over.
Wetzikon-Meilen-Bahn	WMB	1909	1950	(closed)	A rural tramway linking Kempten, Wetzikon and Langholz to the east of Zurich with Meilen on the shores of Lake Zurich. Well outside the city of Zurich, it was at one time indirectly connected to the city's tramways by the UOeb, with which it connected at Langholz, and hence the FB.
Uster-Oetwil-Bahn	UOeB	1909	1949	(closed)	A rural tramway linking Uster, Esslingen, Oetwil am See and Langholz to the east of Zurich. Well outside the city of Zurich, it was at one time indirectly connected to the city's tramways by the FB, with which it connected at Esslingen.
**Forchbahn**	FB	1912			A line linking line Zurich with the towns of Esslingen and Forch. The line opened in 1912 as a rural tramway connecting at Rehalp with the city trams, with inter-running as far as the city centre. The line has since been rebuilt with more railway characteristics, and quite substantial trains, but these continue to operate across the city tram network between Stadelhofen in the city centre and Rehalp.
**Verkehrsbetriebe Zürich**	VBZ	1950			Formed by a rename of the StStZ. Owned by city of Zurich.
BDWM Transport	BDWM	2000	2018	AVA	Created by amalgamation of the BD with the bus operator WM.
**Aargau Verkehr AG**	AVA	2018			Created by amalgamation of BDWM Transport with Wynental and Suhrental Railway. Still operates a light rail service between Dietikon and Wohlen, which is not currently connected to the Zurich tram system, along with other unconnected rail services outside the Zurich area. The line between Dietikon and Wohlen will be reconnected with the Zurich tram system when the Limmattal light rail line is completed (see Future developments).

== Operation ==
=== Route network ===
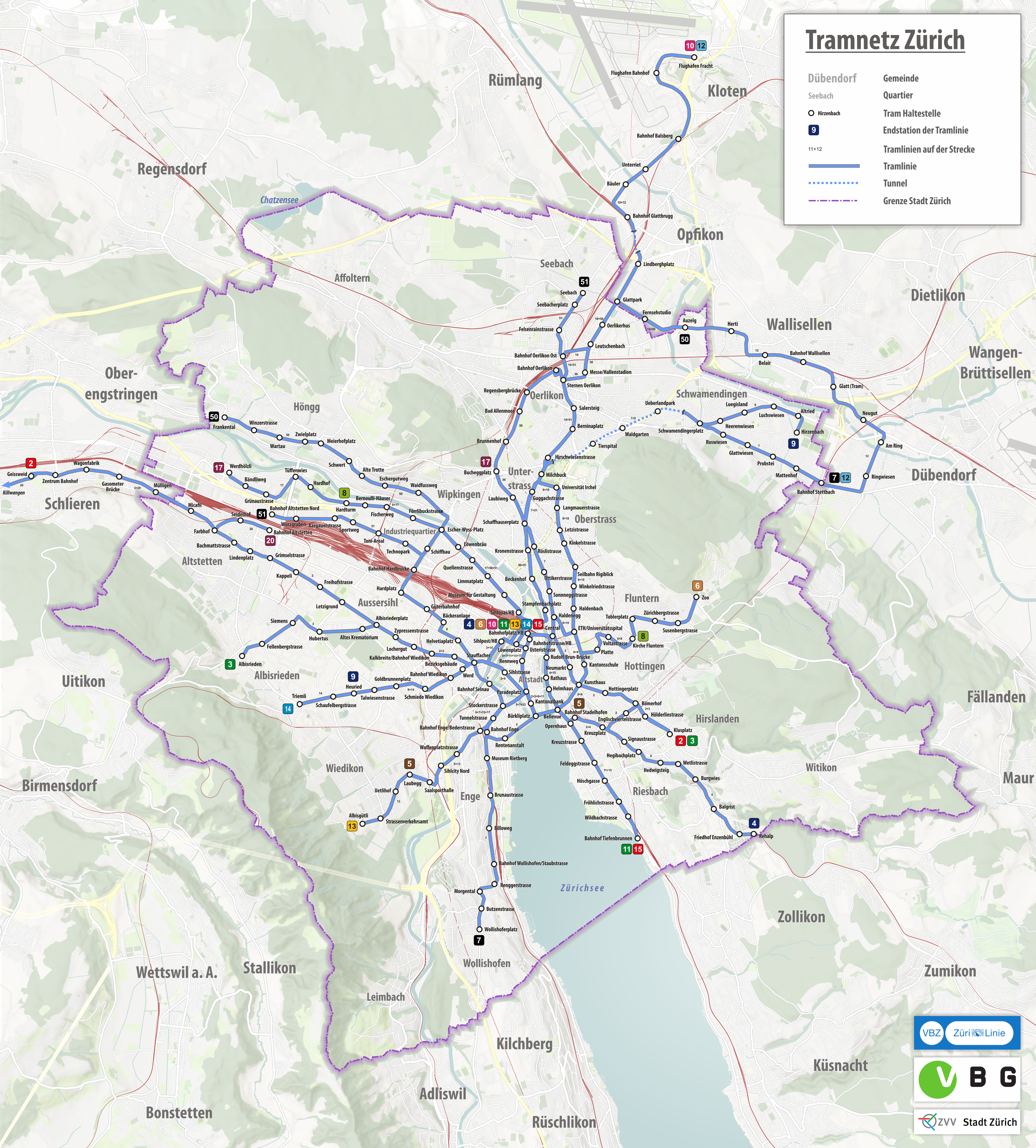
Tram network in Zurich as of December 2025

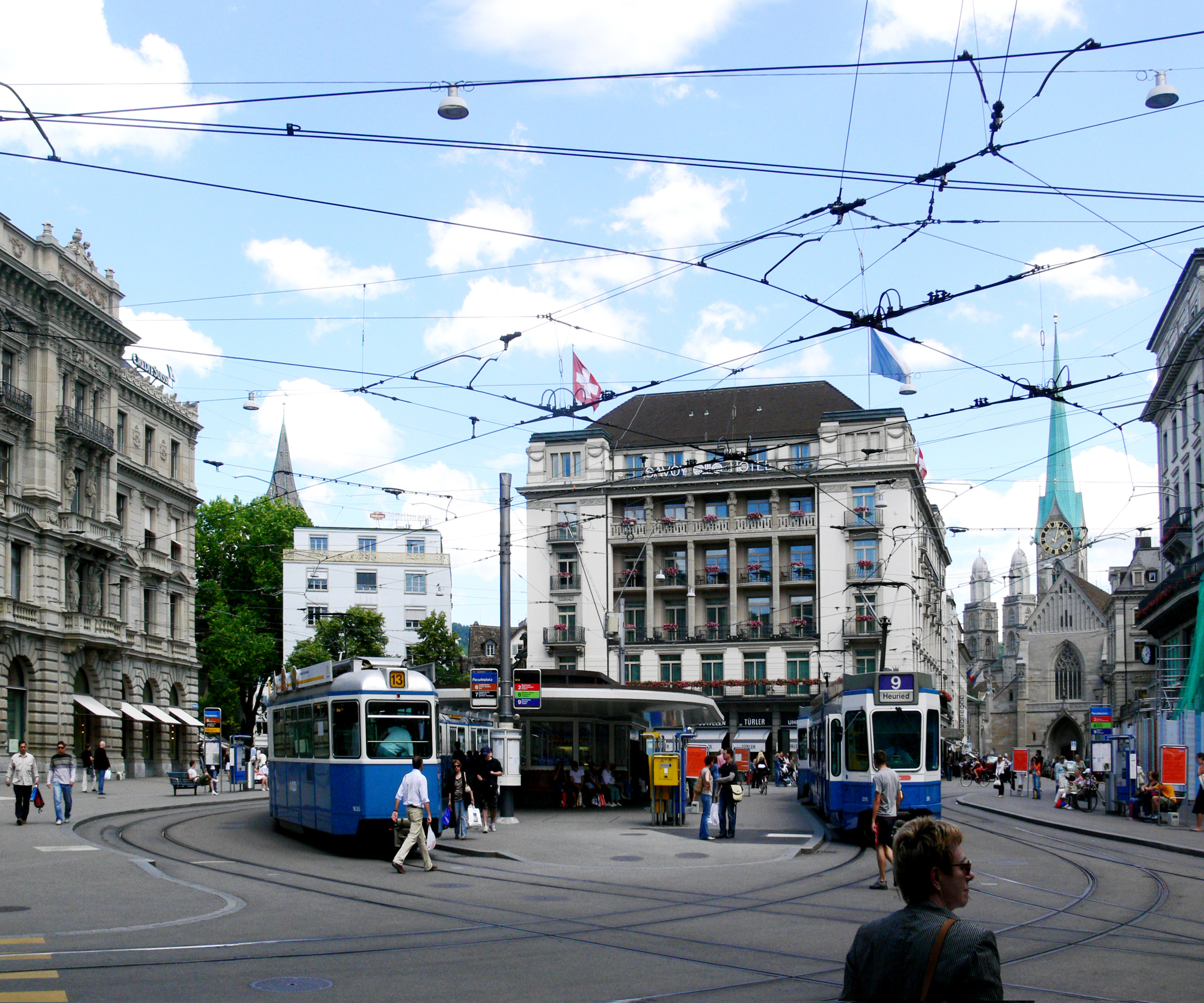
Paradeplatz tram stop is one of the key nodes of the network, served by 7 lines

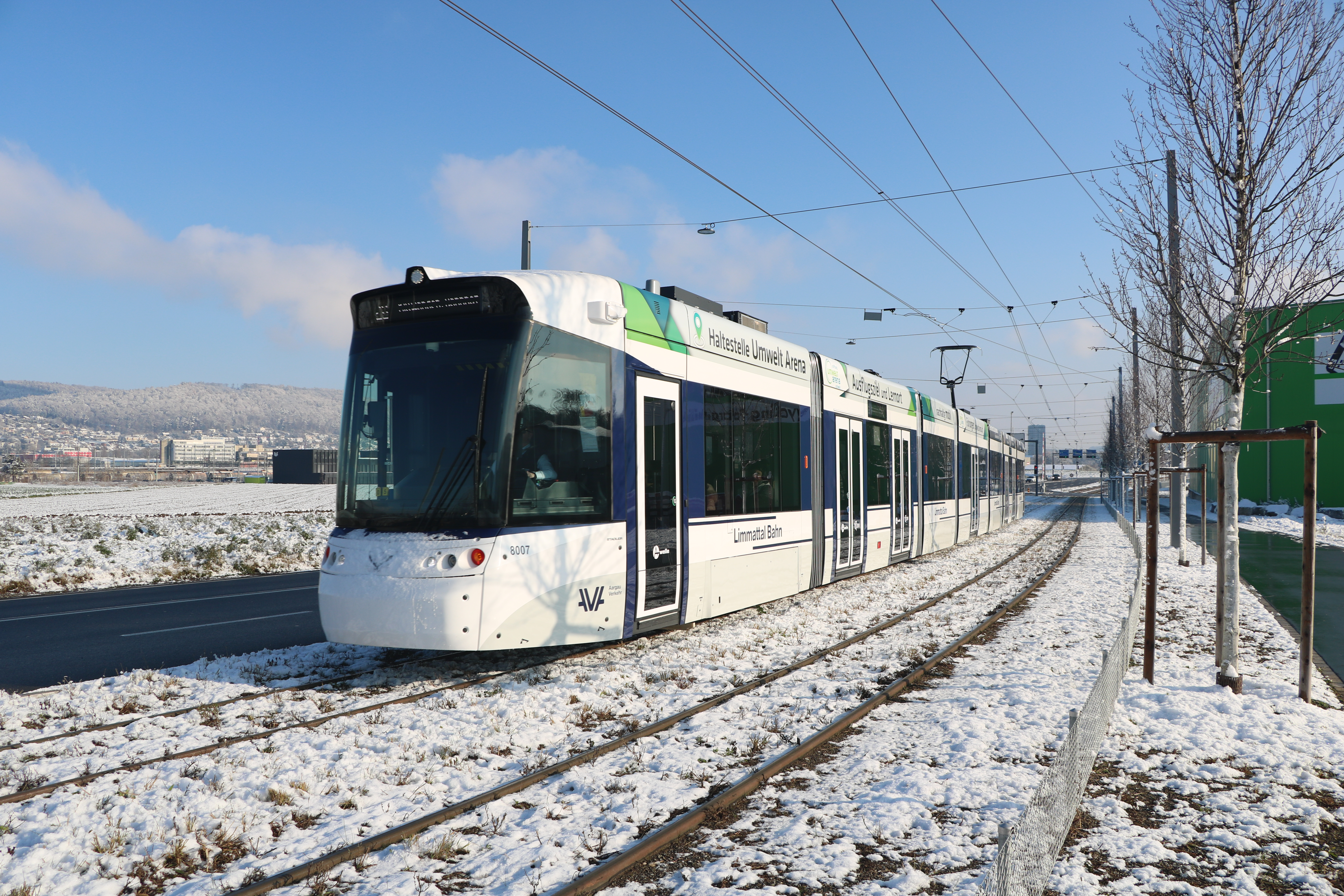
The Limmattalbahn began service as line 20 in December 2022

The following tram lines make up the urban routes and the routes of the Glattalbahn and Limmattalbahn networks.

- Portions of lines in italics are on the Glattalbahn (lines 10, 11, 12) or the Limmattalbahn (lines 2, 20) tracks (otherwise VBZ tracks)
- Brackets indicate portions of a line that are only served by that line during peak hour. Deviations from regular lines are possible (e.g. during events such as Street Parade)
- The abbreviation Bhf. (Bahnhof) indicates stops next to railway stations
- Hauptbahnhof (HB) is Zurich main station, with four nearby tram stops: Bahnhofplatz/HB, Bahnhofquai/HB, Bahnhofstrasse/HB and Sihlquai/HB. Two other stations, Sihlpost/HB and Central, are within walking distance

Tram network December 2025 – December 2026
Line	Selected stops on the line	Notes
2^{†}	Klusplatz – Römerhof – Kreuzplatz – Bhf. Stadelhofen – Bellevue – Bürkliplatz – Paradeplatz – Stauffacher – Albisriederplatz – Farbhof – Bhf. Schlieren – Schlieren Geissweid	
3	Klusplatz – Römerhof – Kunsthaus – Central – Bahnhofplatz/HB – Stauffacher – Albisriederplatz – Albisrieden	
4^{†}^{‡}	Rehalp – Kreuzplatz – Bhf. Stadelhofen – Bellevue – Central – Bahnhofstrasse/HB	continues as line 13 from Bahnhofstrasse/HB
5^{†}^{‡}	Laubegg – Bhf. Enge – Bürkliplatz – Bellevue – Bhf. Stadelhofen	
6^{‡}	Bahnhofplatz/HB – Central – ETH/Universitätsspital – Kirche Fluntern – Zoo	continues as line 14 from Bahnhofplatz/HB
7	Bhf. Stettbach – Schwamendingerplatz – Milchbuck – Schaffhauserplatz – Central – Bahnhofstrasse/HB – Paradeplatz – Bhf. Enge – Bhf. Wollishofen – Wollishoferplatz	
8^{†}	Hardturm – Escher-Wyss-Platz – Bhf. Hardbrücke – Hardplatz – Stauffacher – Bhf. Selnau – Bhf. Enge – Bürkliplatz – Bellevue – Kunsthaus – Kirche Fluntern (– Zoo)	
9	Hirzenbach – Schwamendingerplatz – Milchbuck – Seilbahn Rigiblick – ETH/Universitätsspital – Kunsthaus – Bellevue – Bürkliplatz – Paradeplatz – Stauffacher – Heuried (– Triemli)	
10^{‡}	Bahnhofstrasse/HB (Note: Only boarding) – (Bahnhofplatz/HB (Note: Only deboarding) –) Central – ETH/Universitätsspital – Seilbahn Rigiblick – Milchbuck – Sternen Oerlikon – Bhf. Oerlikon Ost – Glattpark – Bhf. Glattbrugg – Zürich Flughafen (Zurich)	
11^{†}^{‡}	Bhf. Tiefenbrunnen – Bellevue – Bürkliplatz – Paradeplatz – Bahnhofstrasse/HB	continues as line 15 from Bahnhofstrasse/HB (towards Central)
12	Zurich Flughafen (Zürich) – Bhf.Glattbrugg – Glattpark – Auzelg – Bhf. Wallisellen – Glattzentrum – Bhf. Stettbach	
13^{‡}	Albisgütli – Laubegg – Bhf. Enge – Paradeplatz – Bahnhofstrasse/HB	continues as line 4 from Bahnhofstrasse/HB
14^{‡}	Bahnhofplatz/HB – Stauffacher – Heuried – Triemli	continues as line 6 from Bahnhofplatz/HB
15^{†}^{‡}	Bhf. Tiefenbrunnen – Bellevue – Central	continues as line 11 from Central (towards Bahnhofstrasse/HB)
17^{‡}	Bucheggplatz – Schaffhauserplatz – Sihlquai/HB – Escher-Wyss-Platz – Hardturm – Werdhölzli	
20	Bhf. Altstetten – Farbhof – Bhf. Schlieren – Schlieren Geissweid – Spital Limmattal – Bhf. Dietikon – Shoppi Tivoli – Bhf. Killwangen-Spreitenbach	
50^{‡}	Frankental – Meierhofplatz – Escher-Wyss-Platz – Sihlquai/HB – Schaffhauserplatz – Bucheggplatz – Bhf. Oerlikon – Sternen Oerlikon – Messe/Hallenstadion – Glattpark – Auzelg	temporary construction line
51^{‡}	Seebach – Bhf. Oerlikon Ost – Sternen Oerlikon – Milchbuck – Schaffhauserplatz – Sihlquai/HB – Escher-Wyss-Platz – Bhf. Altstetten Nord	temporary construction line

^{†}lines changed with the December 2025 revision for long-term network development

^{‡}lines changed 14 December 2025–12 December 2026 due to construction work at Bahnhofquai/HB

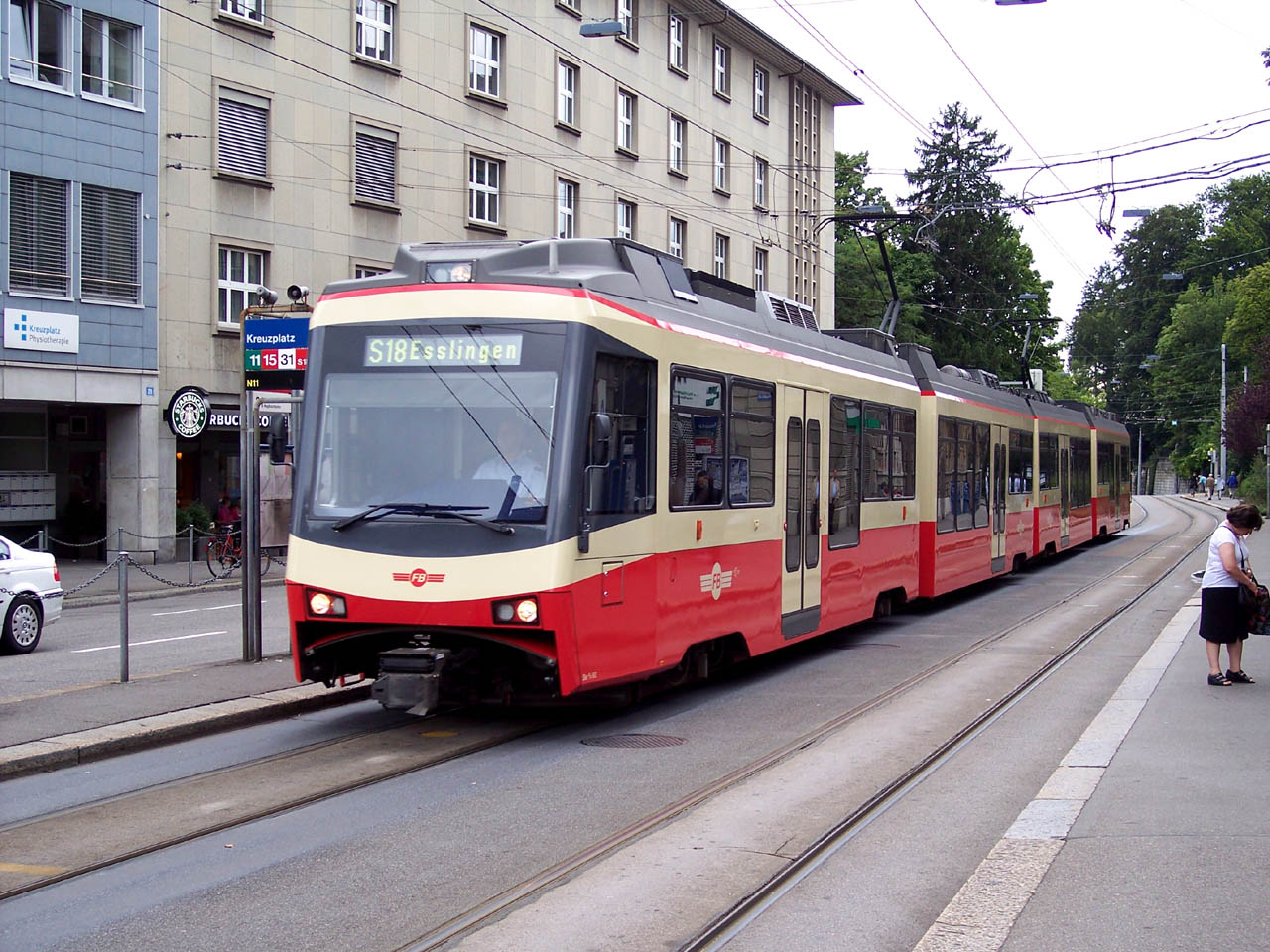
A Forchbahn train of S18 service (Zurich S-Bahn) on Zurich tram tracks

All journeys on lines 6, 10 and 12 are operated by low-floor trams, whilst at least every other journey on lines 2, 3, 4, 7, 9, 11, 13 and 14 are provided by such vehicles. Most, but not all, tram stops are configured to allow passengers in wheelchairs to board low-floor trams.

Of the three lines that operate in part over Glattalbahn tracks, lines 10 and 12 are operated by the VBZ on behalf of the Verkehrsbetriebe Glattal (VBG), normally using tramcars in the VBG's own predominantly white colour scheme, whilst line 11 is operated by the VBZ on its own behalf, normally using vehicles in its own livery.

In December 2022, the Limmattalbahn opened services between Zurich Altstetten and Killwangen-Spreitenbach (Aargau). It was designated line 20 and is operated by AVA using double-ended (i.e. with two driver's cabs) Stadler Citylink vehicles.

The independent Forchbahn (FB) railway uses VBZ trackwork to reach their city centre terminus, at Bahnhof Stadelhofen, from the eastern edge of the city, at Rehalp. The FB trains operate largely in the street for this section of their route, sharing track with VBZ tram lines, but are categorised as line S18 of the city's S-Bahn railway network rather than as part of the tram network. Beyond Rehalp the trains use the FB's own segregated tracks to reach their outer terminus at Esslingen.

On the last weekend of each month, the Zurich Tram Museum operates tram line 21 (Museumslinie) from the city centre to the museum at Burgwies (up to Rehalp at Saturdays), using their own heritage rolling stock.

=== Infrastructure ===
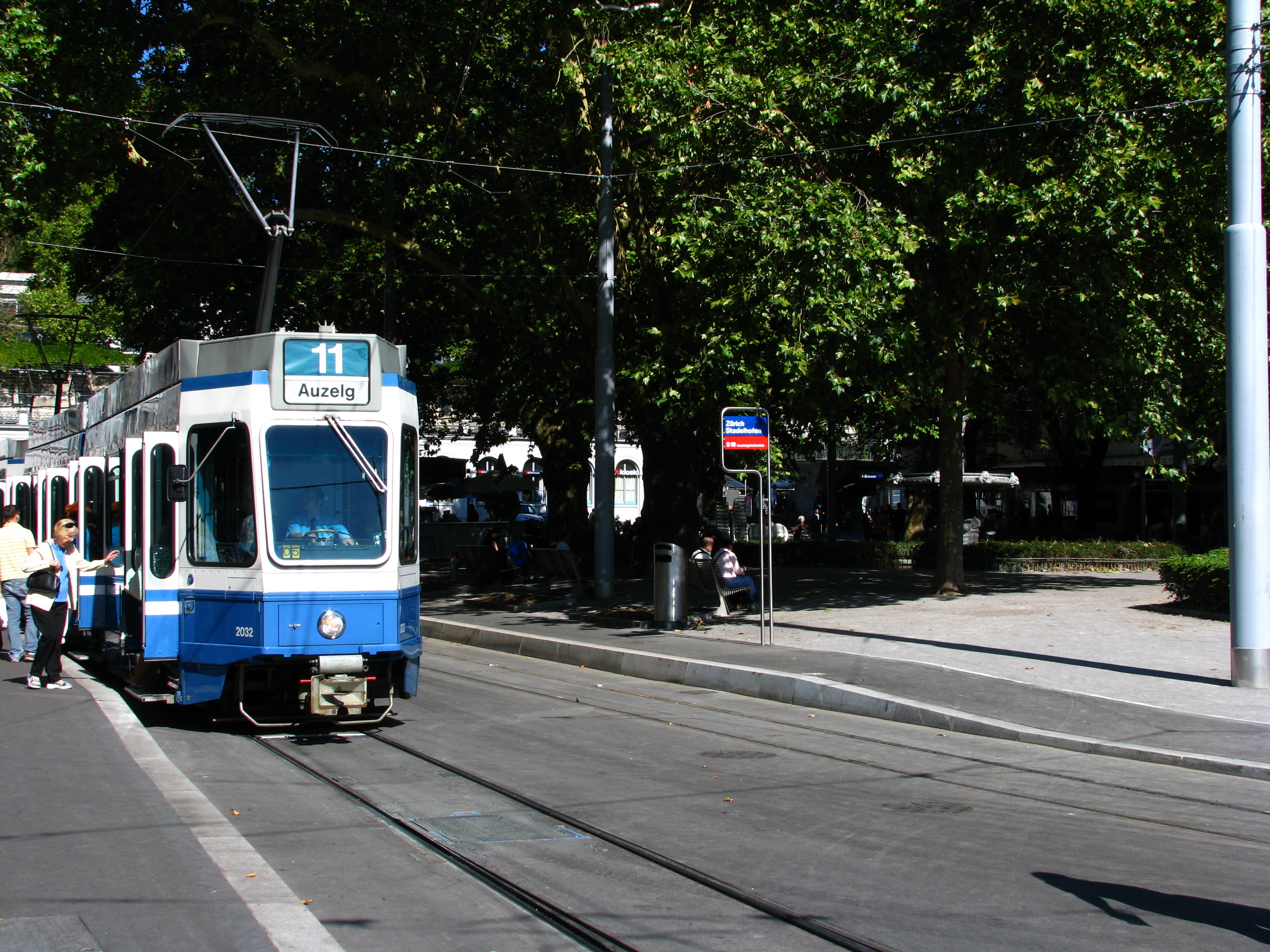
Raised platforms for use with low-floor trams, being used by a high-floor tram

Zurich's tram network is built to metre gauge (3 ft 3 3/8 in gauge). There are 171.9 kilometres (106.8 mi) of track, equating to a network length of 72.9 kilometres (45.3 mi) and a total route length of 118.7 kilometres (73.8 mi). The tracks are electrified using overhead line at 600 V DC, utilising a supply system shared with the city's trolleybus network.

The VBZ infrastructure within Zurich is largely street based, with varying degrees of segregation from other street traffic and significant sections where trams run in unrestricted traffic lanes. In the city centre the tram tracks run through largely pedestrianised streets, and in one place in the suburbs the trams use a tunnel originally constructed for the never completed Zurich U-Bahn system. By contrast, on VBG infrastructure in the Stadtbahn Glattal, VBZ trams operate on long stretches of dedicated track.

Many of Zurich's tram stops have been equipped with boarding platforms raised to match the floor height of the low floor trams, although there are still examples of stops where passengers must board from street level. Zurich's trams are single-ended, with doors on only one side, although Forchbahn trains are double-ended and double-sided. In consequence all terminal locations are equipped with turning loops, and all tram stops are to the nearside of the tram.

=== Depots and workshops ===
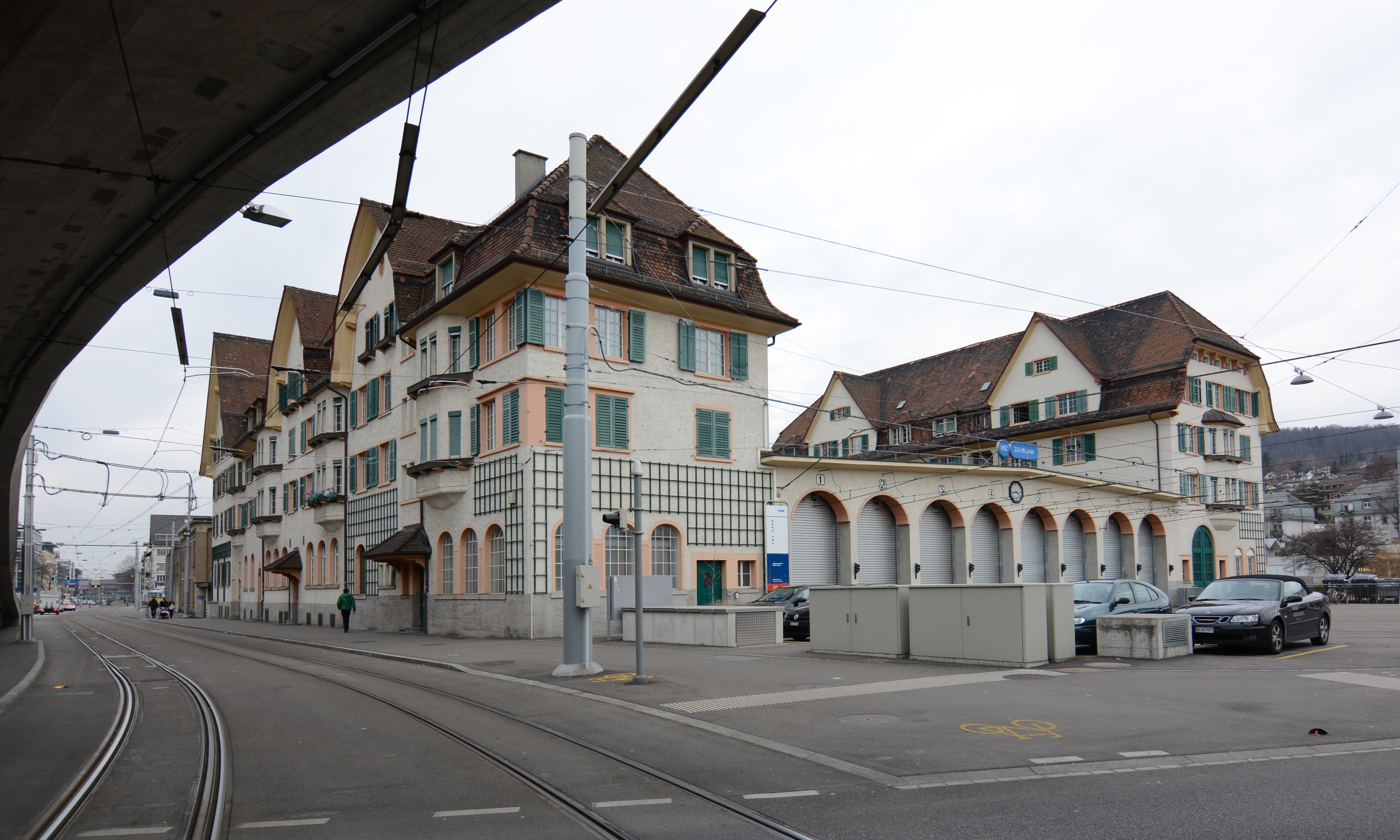
The tram depot at Hard was built in 1911

Zurich's tram fleet is kept in the five operational depots of Hard, Irchel, Kalkbreite, Oerlikon and Wollishofen, together with a permanent way yard at Hardturm. Whilst these depots have the capability to undertake minor maintenance, heavier maintenance is the responsibility of the VBZ's central workshop at Altstetten. This is connected to the tram network, and also has a rail connection to the Swiss Federal Railway system, allowing the delivery of infrastructure items and vehicles by rail.

In addition to the above depots and workshops, two other former tram depots, at Burgweis and Wartau, are also still connected to the tram network. Burgweis depot now houses the Zurich Tram Museum's main collection, whilst Wartau is used as a workshop by that organisation. The rail connections permit the occasional operation of preserved trams on the VBZ network.

=== Tram fleet ===
As of 2012, the VBZ owns 313 tram vehicles, which between them cover over 16 million vehicle-kilometres per year. All regular public services are covered by 289 vehicles of two basic classes, with the remainder of the fleet made up of a number of assorted works vehicles, including some used for the cargo tram service and heritage vehicles. The heritage fleet sees occasional use on special services.

As of 2024, the tram fleet comprises the following vehicles:

Image	Numbers	Type	Notation	Capacity Sit/Stand	Notes
Zurich Be 4-6 Tram 2000 2034 Bellevue	2001-2098	Tram 2000	Be 4/6	50/54	The two section articulated variant of the Tram 2000 design for Zurich, of which 98 vehicles were delivered in two stages from 1976 to 1978, and from 1985 to 1987. Each vehicle is 21.4 metres (70 ft) in length and 2.2 metres (7 ft 3 in) in width. In most cases these cars operate in multiple.
A Tram 2000 tram with low-floor centre section	2099-2121	Tram 2000	Be 4/8	68/75	Originally two section units similar to 2001-2098, these cars were built from 1992 to 1993. Between 1999 and 2005 they were rebuilt with a third central low-floor section. Each vehicle is 28 metres (92 ft) in length and 2.2 metres (7 ft 3 in) in width. They are also known as Sänfte.
Zurich Be 4-6 Tram 2000 2303 Seebach	2301-2315	Tram 2000	Be 4/6	50/57	Two section articulated unit similar to 2001-2098 but without a drivers cab. These cars were built in 1978, and must run as the second unit in multiple with another Tram 2000 unit. Each vehicle is 21.4 metres (70 ft) in length and 2.2 metres (7 ft 3 in) in width.
A single-section Tram 2000 Pony car	2401-2435	Tram 2000	Be 2/4	35/41	Single section non-articulated unit without a drivers cab. These cars were built in two stages from 1985 to 1987, and 1992 to 1993. Like 2301-2315, they must run as the second unit in multiple with another Tram 2000 unit. Each vehicle is 15.4 metres (51 ft) in length and 2.2 metres (7 ft 3 in) in width. They are also known as Pony.
A Bombardier Cobra low-floor tram on typical VBZ street track	3001-3088	Bombardier Cobra	Be 5/6	90/113	The more recent of the two classes of trams in regular service are the 88 modern low-floor Bombardier Cobra trams delivered between 2001 and 2010. 18 of them (3062-3079) were in VBG livery. These are all five section articulated vehicles running on six pairs of wheels, of which five are powered. Each vehicle is 36 metres (118 ft) in length and 2.4 metres (7 ft 10 in) in width. Because of their length, Cobras only run as single units in normal service.
A Bombardier Flexity low-floor tram on typical VBZ street track	4001-4070	Bombardier Flexity	Be 6/8	91/188	The Bombardier Flexity are seven-sectioned unidirectional trams. Service began on the 15th of October 2020. They measure 43 metres (141 ft) in length and 2.4 metres (7 ft 10 in) in width. They are equipped with eight 81 kW traction motors, and have a Bo’2’Bo’Bo’ axle arrangement. The first and last doors, on the first and seventh sections of the tram, measure 0.8 metres (2.6 ft) in width. The other doors, on the second, fourth and sixth sections of the tram, are double-leaf doors and measure 1.3 metres (4.3 ft) in width. They are equipped with the Bombardier’s Obstacle Detection Assistance System (ODAS). The first batch of 70 trams is to be fully delivered by the third quarter of 2024. A further 40 trams will be delivered between 2025 and 2027.

=== Fares and tickets ===
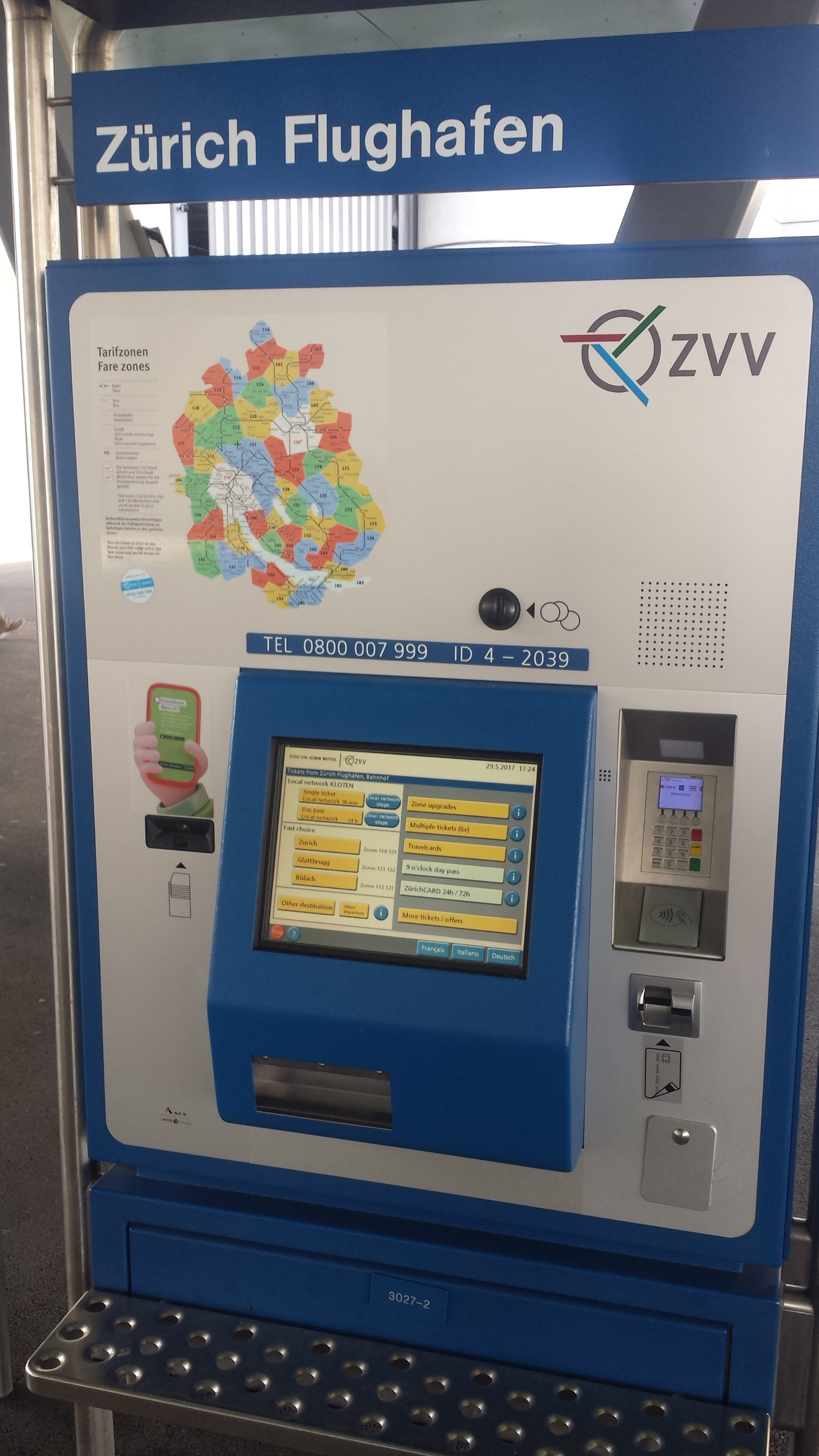
Ticket machine

Like the rest of the VBZ network, Zurich's tram network operates on a proof-of-payment system. All tram stops are equipped with ticket machines, and passengers are required to purchase a ticket before boarding the vehicle. Passengers may board through any door and are not required to show tickets on boarding. Instead, tickets are randomly checked by roving teams of fare inspectors, and fines are imposed on passengers found without one.

Tram services are operated within the fare and ticketing system provided by the cantonal public transport authority, the Zürcher Verkehrsverbund (ZVV). This system covers the whole of the canton of Zurich and thus covers travel on other modes and services, provided by many other operators, and includes the Zurich S-Bahn suburban rail network. Free transfer is permitted between different vehicles, lines, modes and operators, provided a ticket valid for the whole journey is held.

The ZVV system is zone-based, with fares for individual journeys set by the zones the journey passes through. The Zurich tram network extends over just two of these zones, with zone 110 covering the city routes, and zone 121 covering the Stadtbahn Glattal routes. Both single-journey and day tickets are available, as are a number of passes with longer validities.

=== Cargo tram ===
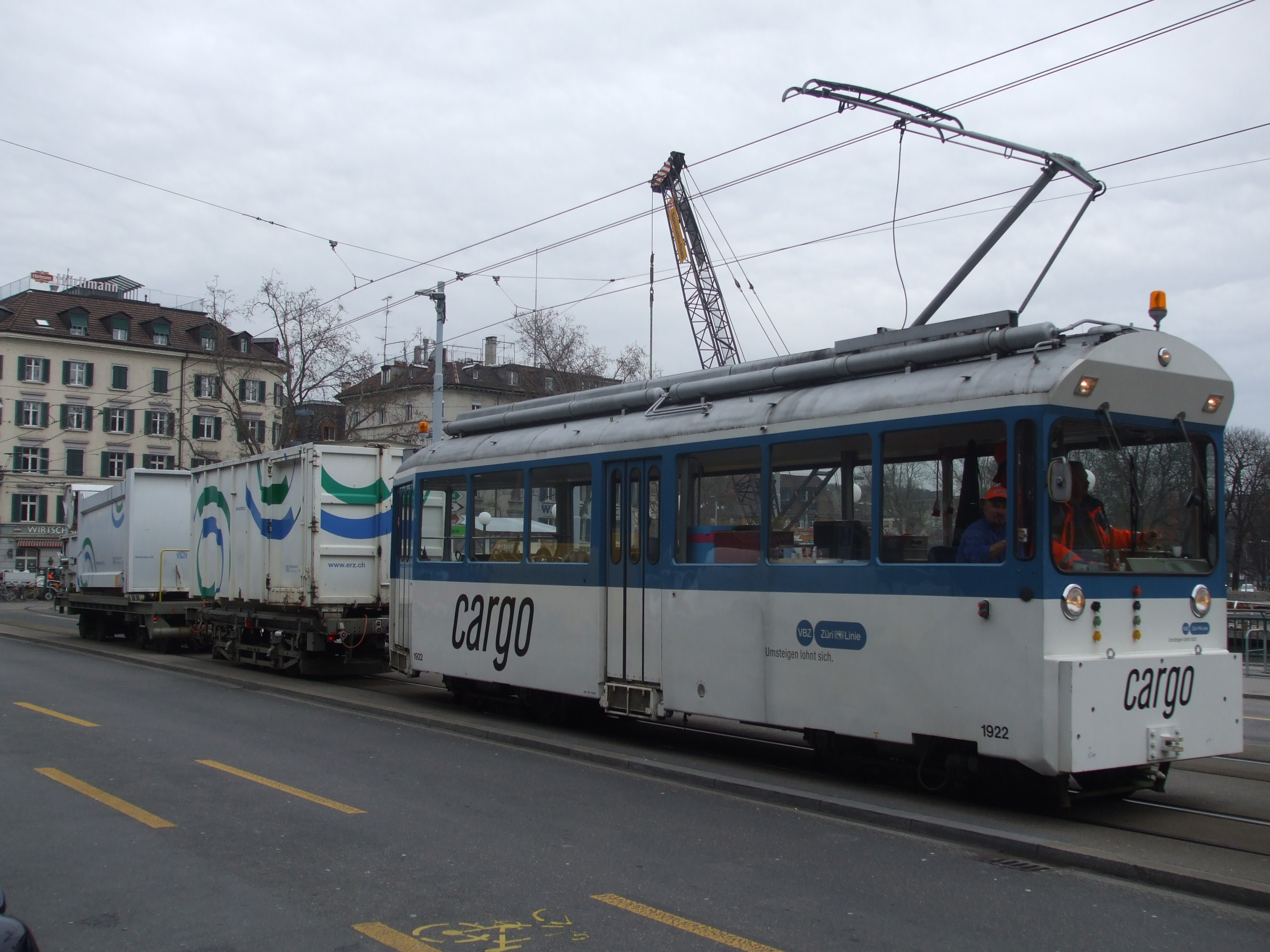
The cargo tram

Besides its passenger transport activities, VBZ, jointly with the city refuse and recycling department ERZ, operates the cargo tram to collect bulky waste. The cargo tram serves 10 different collection points around Zurich, calling at each on different days of the month. The collected refuse is taken to a specially constructed siding at the ERZ yard adjacent to the Werdhölzli tram terminus.

The service was introduced in 2003, as an attempt to reduce the amount of bulky waste items dumped illegally every year. As Zurich has an extensive tram network serving most neighbourhoods, and many suitable sidings not used by regular services, it was decided to use the tram network. In its first year of operation it was responsible for the collection of 380 tonnes (370 long tons; 420 short tons) of waste.

The collected waste is carried in two standard refuse containers, which are mounted on four-wheeled flat wagons. These are hauled by car 1922, a former Swiss Standard Tram, originally delivered to Zurich in 1940, and converted into a works car in 1980.

== Future developments ==
=== System expansion ===
==== Tram Affoltern ====
Currently under planning is the Tram Affoltern, an extension of tracks from Radiostudio to Holzerhurd in Zurich Affoltern. It is expected to open in 2029. Once completed, tram line 11 will be diverted to Holzerhurd from Brunnenhof (formerly called Radiostudio), replacing the trolleybus line 32 on that section (line 32 will terminate at Bucheggplatz). At the same time, tram line 15 will be extended from Bucheggplatz to Auzelg on the tracks currently used by line 11.

==== Tram Nordtangente ====
Also under discussion is the Tram Nordtangente, a tram line from Zurich Affoltern to Schwamendingen via Oerlikon.

==== Other extensions ====
Other extensions (after 2035) are under discussion, including the reenactment of tram line 1 from Hauptbahnhof to Altstetten (served by trolleybus line 31 since the original line 1 was terminated and its tracks removed in the 1950s).

== See also ==
- Public transport in Zurich
- List of railway companies in Switzerland
- List of town tramway systems in Switzerland

== Bibliography ==
- Bernet, Ralph (2000). Trams in der Schweiz: von Basel bis Zürich: Strassenbahn-Betriebe einst und jetzt [Trams in Switzerland: from Basel to Zurich: Tramway Operators Then and Now] (in German). München: GeraMond-Verlag. ISBN 393278507X.
- Bodmer, Hans (2011). Das Tram in Zürich 1928 bis 1962 [The Tram in Zurich 1928 to 1962] (in German). Erfurt: Sutton Verlag GmbH. ISBN 9783866809291.
- Galliker, Hans-Rudolf (1997). Tramstadt: Verkehrsplanung, öffentlicher Nahverkehr und Stadtentwicklung am Beispiel der Stadt Zürich [Tram City: Transport Planning, Local Public Transport and Urban Development with the City of Zurich as an Example] (in German). Zurich: Chronos-Verlag. ISBN 3905312026.
- Schwandl, Robert (2010). Schwandl's Tram Atlas Schweiz & Österreich. Berlin: Robert Schwandl Verlag. ISBN 978 3 936573 27 5. (in German and English)
