= Limmattal tramway =

Former tram in Zürich, Switzerland

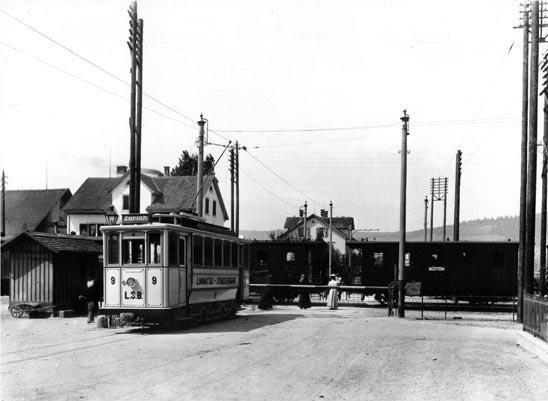
- Car 9 at one of the level crossings prior to 1924

Overview
- Status: Partly closed; partly incorporated in city tramway
- Locale: Canton of Zürich, Switzerland

Service
- Services: 2

History
- Opened: 1900
- Closed: 1928/1931/1955

Technical
- Line length: 12 kilometres (7.5 mi)
- Track gauge: 1,000 mm (3 ft 3 3/8 in) metre gauge

The Limmattal tramway (German: Limmattal-Strassenbahn, LSB) was a metre gauge electric tramway that operated in the Limmat Valley, situated in the Swiss canton of Zürich to the west of the city of Zürich. Because of the prominent display of the initials LSB on the line's distinctive yellow trams, the line was popularly known as the Lisebethli.

The line opened in 1900 as an 8.8-kilometre (5.5 mi) long interurban line from the former Zürich city boundary at Letzigraben, via Altstetten (Farbhof) and Schlieren to Dietikon. A 3.2-kilometre (2.0 mi) long branch from Schlieren to Weiningen followed in 1901. A connection with Zürich's city trams, then operated by the Städtische Strassenbahn Zürich or StStZ, was made at Letzigraben. In its early life the line was beset by problems with its level crossings over the Swiss Northeastern Railway at Farbhof and Schlieren, which the trams were only permitted to cross empty, leaving their passengers to walk.

By the late 1920s the track was in poor condition, although by then the level crossings had been replaced by bridges. The line between Schlieren and Dietikon closed in 1928, whilst that between Schlieren and Weiningen closed in 1931, at the same time as the rest of the line from Letzigraben to Schlieren were acquired by the StStZ. In 1950, the StStZ was renamed the Verkehrsbetriebe Zürich or VBZ. The section of route between Farbhof and Schlieren was closed in 1955, being replaced by a westward extension of Zürich trolleybus route 31. The remaining section, between Letzigraben and Farbhof, is still in use, having been integrated into the Zürich city tram network as part of Zürich tram route 2.

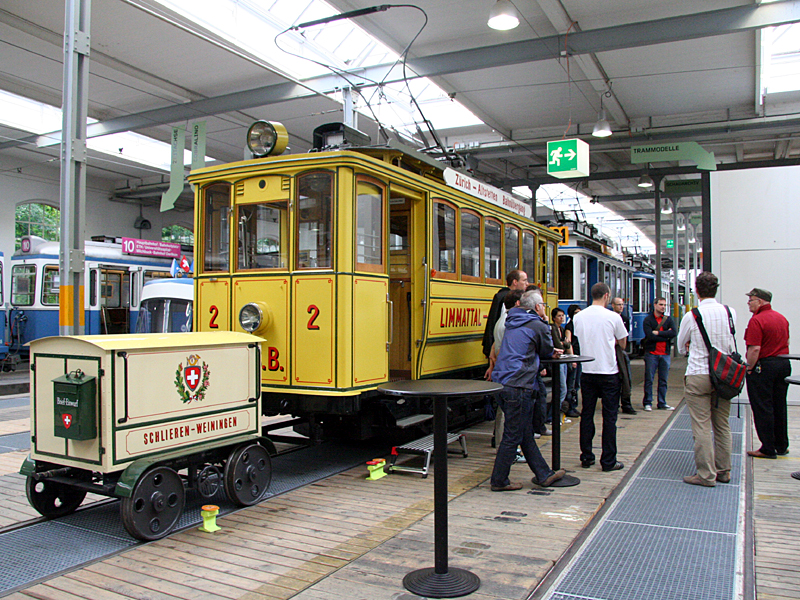
The preserved car 2 in the Zürich tram museum, with the postal trailer

One of the line's trams, numbered Ce 2/2 2 and dating from 1900, is preserved at the Zürich tram museum. It sees occasional operation and is painted in the line's yellow livery. It is often seen with a small postal trailer that was used to carry mail on the line.

The Limmattal light rail line was opened in December 2022, linking Zürich Altstetten railway station to Killwangen and using a roughly similar alignment to the Limmattal tramway's former route between Farbhof and Dietikon. As part of this development, Zürich tram route 2 was re-extended over the new line between Farbhof and Schlieren, replacing the trolleybus route.
