= Stauffacher =

Tram junction in Zurich, Switzerland

Coordinates: 47.3735°N 8.5292°E

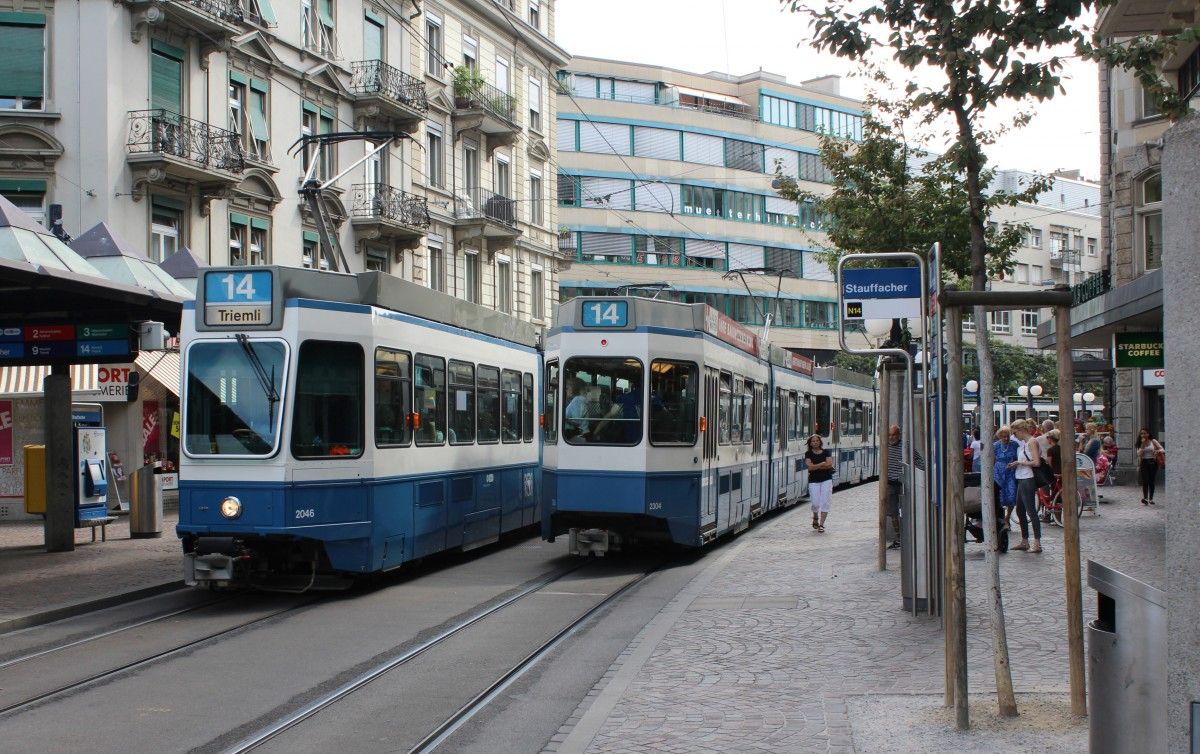
Stauffacher tram stop in 2015

Stauffacher is an important nodal station of the Zurich tram network. It is located in the Aussersihl district of the city of Zurich, Switzerland, next to the St. Jakob church. It is situated along the Badenerstrasse, between Bäckerstrasse and Stauffacherstrasse. The tram stop was named after the latter street, which itself had been named for Werner Stauffacher in 1893.

Stauffacher is officially just the name of the tram stop, not the square itself. There was formerly a Stauffacherplatz some 200 m (660 ft) further along the street towards the Sihl, named in 1898. Since the name of the tram stop induced common usage to associate Stauffacherplatz with the tram stop, leading to confusion with the actual Stauffacherplatz, the latter was renamed to Ernst-Nobs-Platz in 2003.

Stauffacher is served by tram lines 2, 3, 8, 9 and 14.

== St. Jakob ==
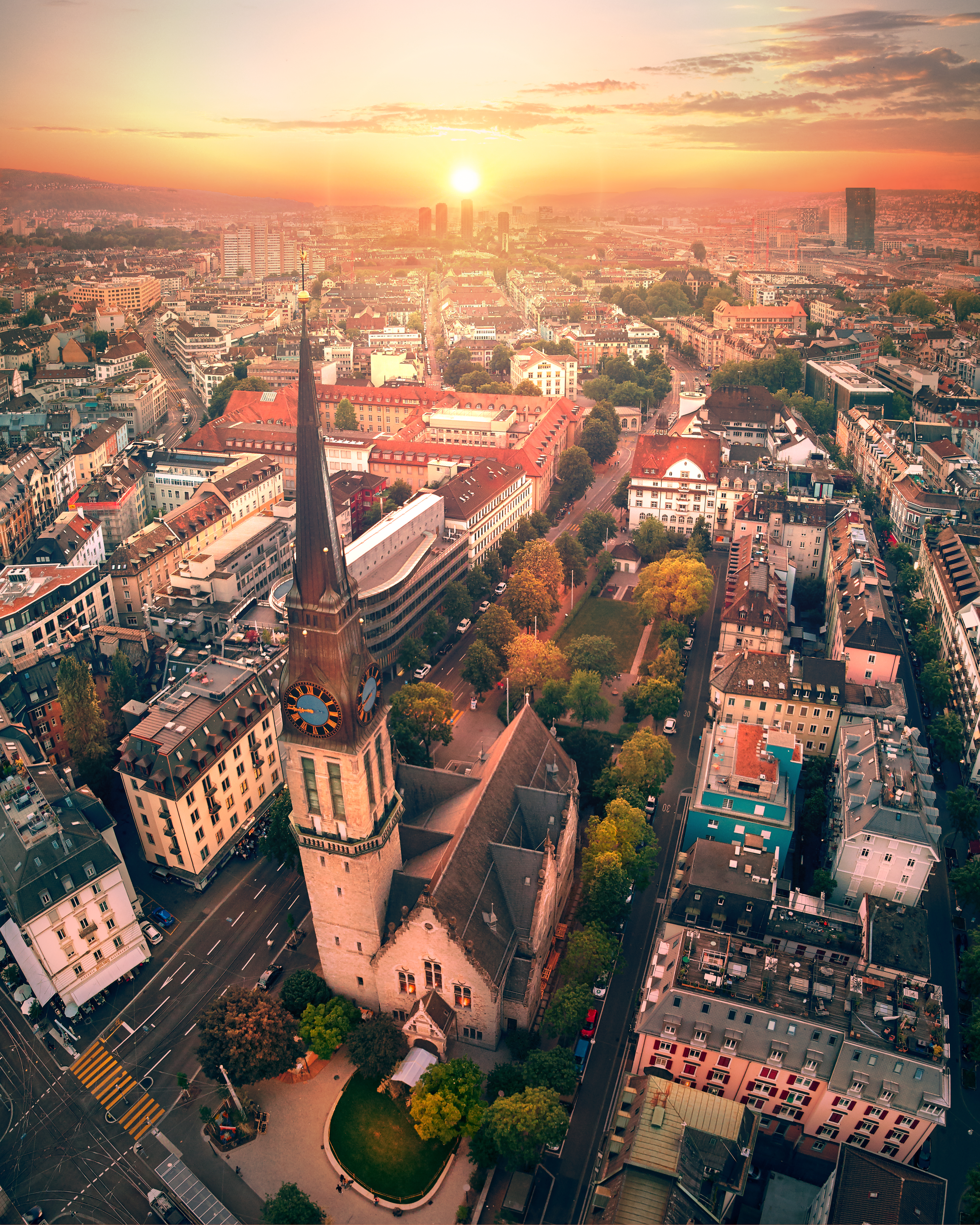
St. Jakob church

St. Jakob was the site of a sick-house outside the town of Zurich and an associated chapel since the 11th century. The first historical mention of the St. Jakob church dates to 1221. It was the site of the Battle of St. Jakob an der Sihl in 1443. In 1677, the sick-house was transformed into a Pfrundhaus (senior citizens' residence), disestablished in 1842. The current St. Jakob church building was inaugurated in 1901.
