= Zurich Tram Museum =

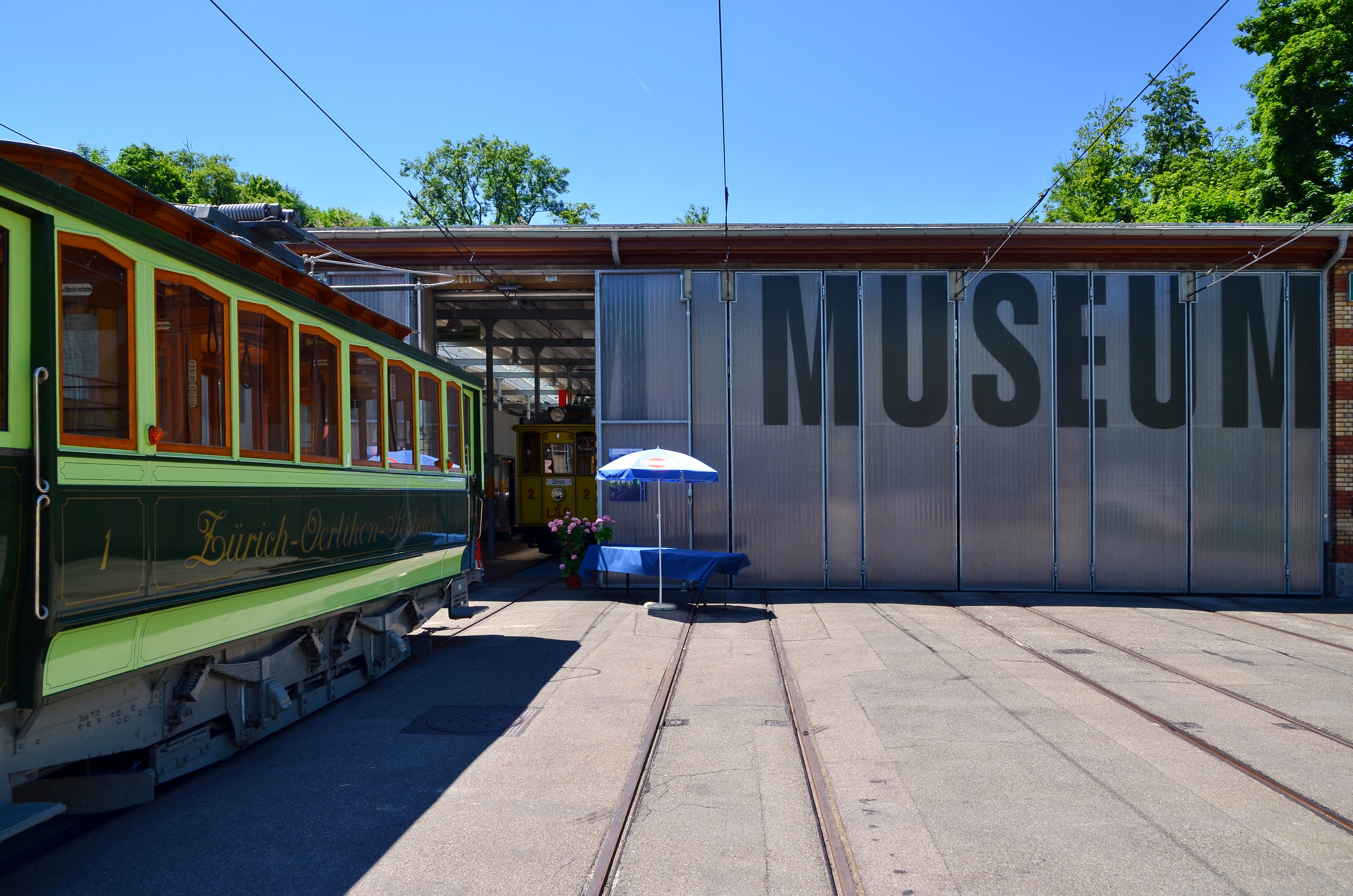
- Established: 1967
- Location: Forchstrasse 260, 8008 Zurich, Switzerland
- Coordinates: 47.3576°N 8.5716°E
- Type: Transport museum
- Public transit access: 4
- Website: tram-museum.ch

The Zurich Tram Museum (German: Tram-Museum Zürich; TMZ) is a transport museum in the Swiss city of Zurich, specialising in the history of the Zurich tram system. The main museum site is located at the former tram depot, Tramdepot Burgwies. The museum also maintains a workshop at the much smaller former tram depot of Wartau.

The tram museum is run by an association, the Verein Tram Museum Zürich, which has some 500 members, and is responsible for looking after the exhibits of the museum. The tram cars remain in the ownership of the Verkehrsbetriebe Zürich, the city-owned operator of the Zürich tram system.

== History ==
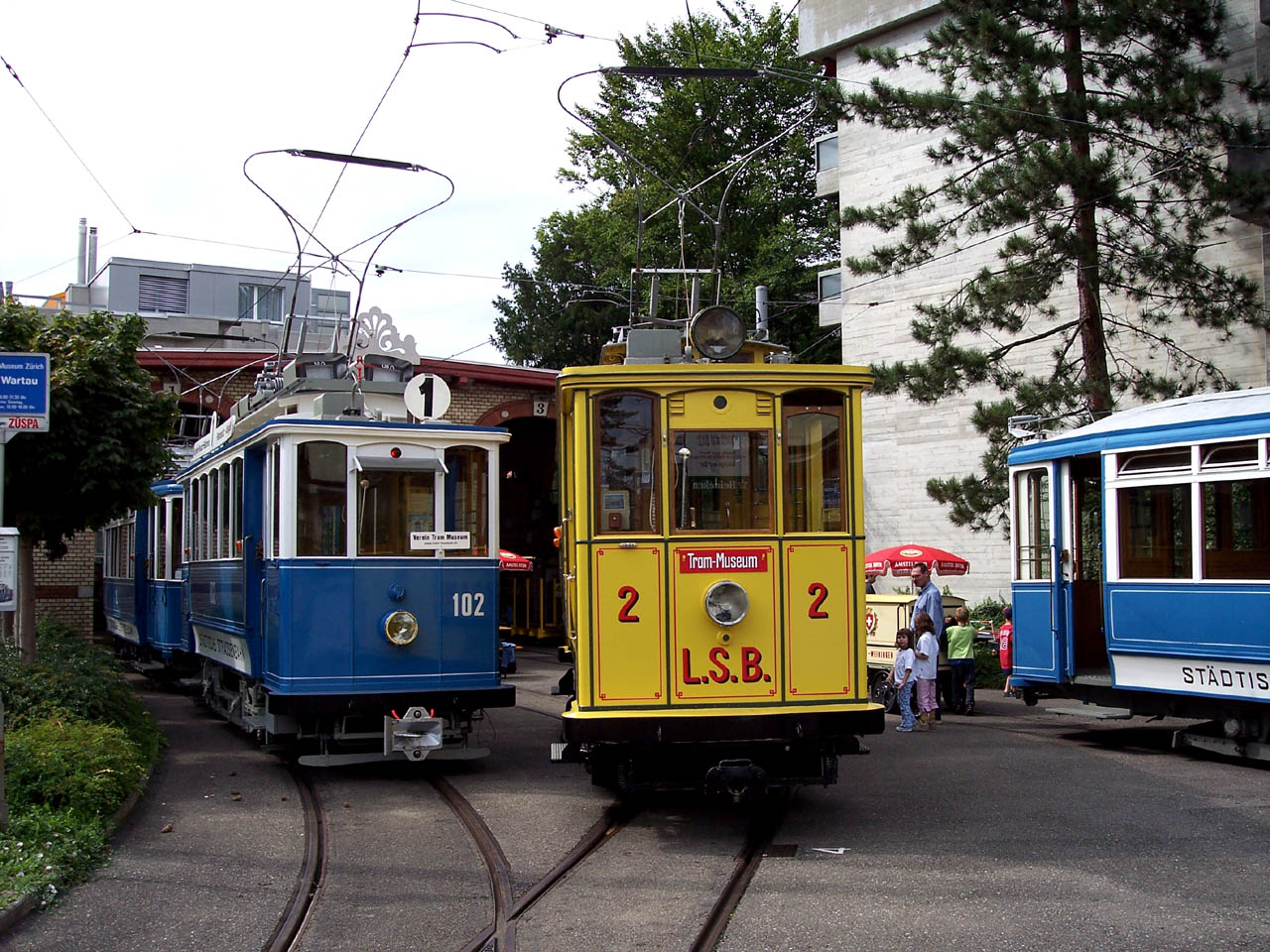
Preserved cars outside the Wartau site.

The Zurich Tram Museum was founded in 1967, and at first it used various borrowed locations to store and work on its exhibits. In 1989 it took over the tiny former Strassenbahn Zürich–Höngg (StZH) tram depot at Wartau, which had been out of use as a tram depot since the 1923 acquisition of the StZH by the city, and opened its first public museum there. The new museum was just big enough to hold five preserved trams.

In May 2007, the museum moved to the significantly larger former tram depot at Burgwies, although Wartau has been retained as a workshop and store. On 26 May 2007, twelve heritage trams each ran from a different Zurich terminus, converging into a parade along the Limmatquai. At the end of the parade, they ran to the new museum at Burgwies.

On 21 May 2017, to celebrate both the fiftieth anniversary of the foundation of the tram museum, and the tenth anniversary of its move to Burgweis, another tram parade was held through the city centre. The parade comprised 18 tram cars from all epochs between 1885 and 2006 and was led by a horse-drawn replica of a Zurich horse tram that is normally kept at the Swiss Museum of Transport in Lucerne. Other trams came from the Zürich Tram Museum's preserved fleet, and from Verkehrsbetriebe Zürich's current operational fleet. The tram crews and passengers wore costumes appropriate to the era of the tram in which they travelled.

== Access ==
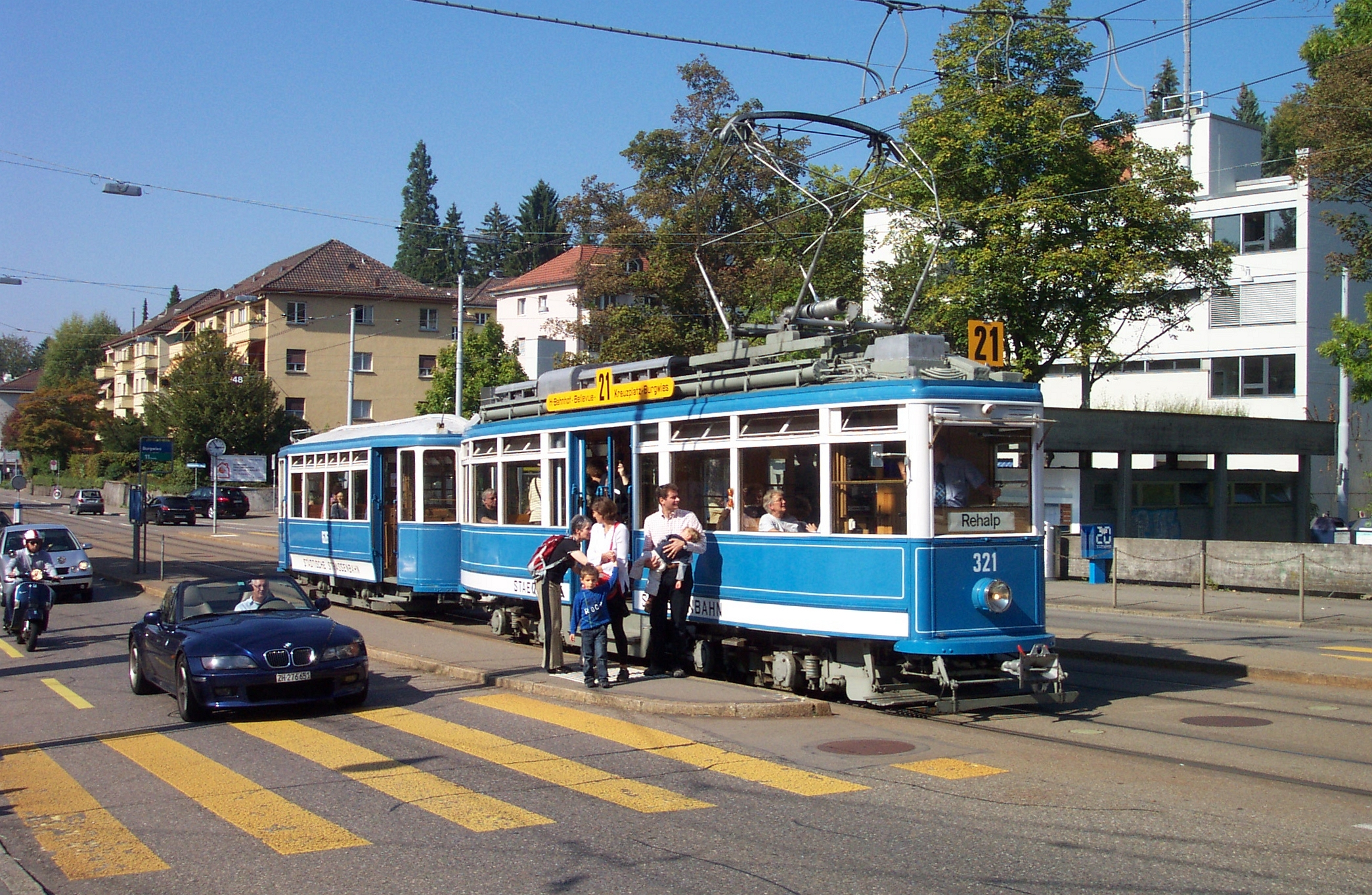
Tram 321+626 on museum route 21

The main museum site at Burgwies is open to the public on several days a week, with exact opening hours varying by day of the week and season of the year. The museum is located by the Bergweis tram stop, on tram route 4 at the boundary of the city's Weinegg and Hirslanden quarters. The museum also runs an occasional historic tram service between Burgwies and the city centre, billed as tram route 21. Route 21 operates on both days of the last weekend of each month, providing a half-hourly frequency in summer and an hourly frequency in winter, during museum opening hours.

The site at Wartau is located on tram route 13 in the Höngg quarter, but is not normally open to the public.

== Collection ==
=== Tram fleet ===
The museum's collection includes about 20 preserved tram cars, the majority of which are operational. In addition to cars from Zurich's city-owned fleet, the collection includes cars from the private companies that operated routes around Zurich in the early days. Cars from the city fleet demonstrate changes in design over time, from cars very similar to these early private sector vehicles, through the 1930s Elefant bogie cars and 1940s Swiss Standard Tram cars, to trams recently retired.

The preserved tram fleet of the museum includes the following vehicles:

Number	Type	Year	Notes	Image
1	Ce 2/2	1897	Two-axle motor tram originally built for the Strassenbahn Zürich-Oerlikon-Seebach and preserved in their green livery. This is the oldest operable electric tram car in Switzerland.	
2	Ce 2/2	1900	Motor tram originally built for the Limmattal tramway and preserved in their yellow livery. Known as Lisbethli, after the popular name of its original line.	
2		1907	Motor tram originally built for the Albisgütlibahn and sold to the Bex–Villars–Bretaye Railway (BVB) in 1953. Numbered 8 by the BVB. Returned to Zurich for preservation in 2006.	
2	Ce 2/2	1928	Two axle motor tram built for the Städtische Strassenbahn Zürich (StStZ) of a class popularly known as schnelläufer (fast runner).	
32		1939	Three axle motor tram of a two-car class popularly known as geissbock (billy goat). It was a prototype (at least as far as its bodywork was concerned) for what was to become the Swiss Standard Tram, and was an important milestone in the development of modern tram designs internationally.	
102	Ce 2/2	1900	Two-axle motor tram. The oldest extant vehicle built for the StStZ.	
119	B	1935	Light rail trailer car originally from the Lausanne tramway, acquired by the Forchbahn in 1962 and preserved in the latter's red livery. Because of its origins, popularly known as lausanner.	
176	Ce 2/2	1909	Two-axle motor tram built for the StStZ. A later and updated version of the design seen in car 102, with a riveted frame and four larger windows in place of 102's five windows, this is the youngest car in the museum to retain longitudinal seating.	
321	Ce 4/4	1930	Four-axle centre-entrance motor tram. One of a class of 50 similar vehicles popularly known by the name elefant (elephant). With a weight of 27 tonnes and four 80 hp motors, these cars were used to haul up to three two-axle trailers over Zürich's considerable gradients.	
455	C	1912	Tram trailer built for the StStZ.	
626	C	1925	Tram trailer.	
679	C	1930	Tram trailer.	
687	C	1931	Tram trailer.	
732	C4	1949	Four-axle tram trailer for use with Swiss Standard trams.	
1392	Be 4/4	1950	Medium weight Swiss Standard tram, a four-axle motor tram of a type popularly known as Kurbeli.	
1430	Be 4/4	1960	Motor tram of a type popularly known as the P16 or Karpfen (carp). At the time it was built, there were plans to place Zurich's tram lines in tunnels called the Tiefbahn, and it was realised that the Swiss Standard trams were not seen as suitable for this, because the doors on their tapered car ends would not have aligned with the proposed station platforms. This car had its doors parallel to its sides, but it was found that it could not run on some existing routes, and only one batch of 15 motor tram and trailer pairs was built.	
1530	Be 4/4	1949	Light weight Swiss Standard tram, a four-axle motor tram of a type popularly known as Pedaler.	
1675	Be 4/6	1968	Six-axle, three section articulated tram of a type popularly known as Mirage. A development of the Karpfen design, but using articulation to overcome that design's limitations, the Mirage was originally intended to operate both on the surface and in the planned Tiefbahn tunnels, but the tunnels were cancelled in 1962.	
1905	Xe 2/2	1962	Depot shunter popularly known as laubfrosch (tree frog). Built in 1962 using parts from withdrawn trams, its open construction and single central controller was an efficient design for shunting trailer cars, used especially during peak periods.	
1935	Xe 2/2	1914	Motor works car popularly known as besenwagen (broom wagon).	

=== Other exhibits ===
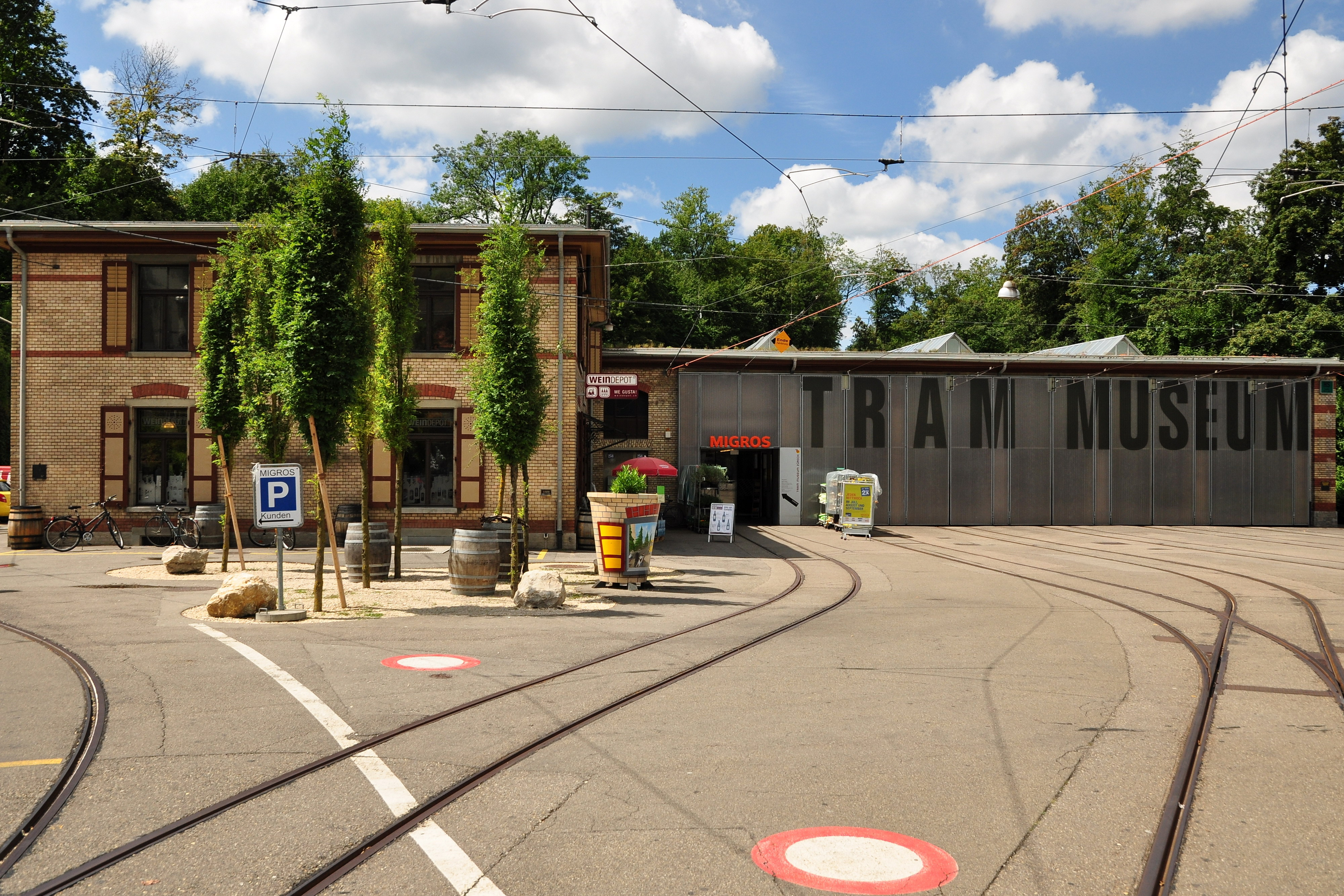
The Burgweis depot

The museum also includes a mezzanine level with smaller exhibits. These include a model tramway layout illustrating the city's street scene over the years, together with a selection of documents and photographs. The museum shop stocks a selection of books, postcards, models and souvenirs.

The museum building, the former Tramdepot Burgwies, is also a significant exhibit in its own right, and is shared with a branch of the Migros supermarket chain. The building is inscribed on the Swiss Inventory of Cultural Property of National Significance.

== See also ==
- List of museums in Switzerland
