= Trams in Vinnytsia =

Electric tram system in Vinnytsia, Ukraine

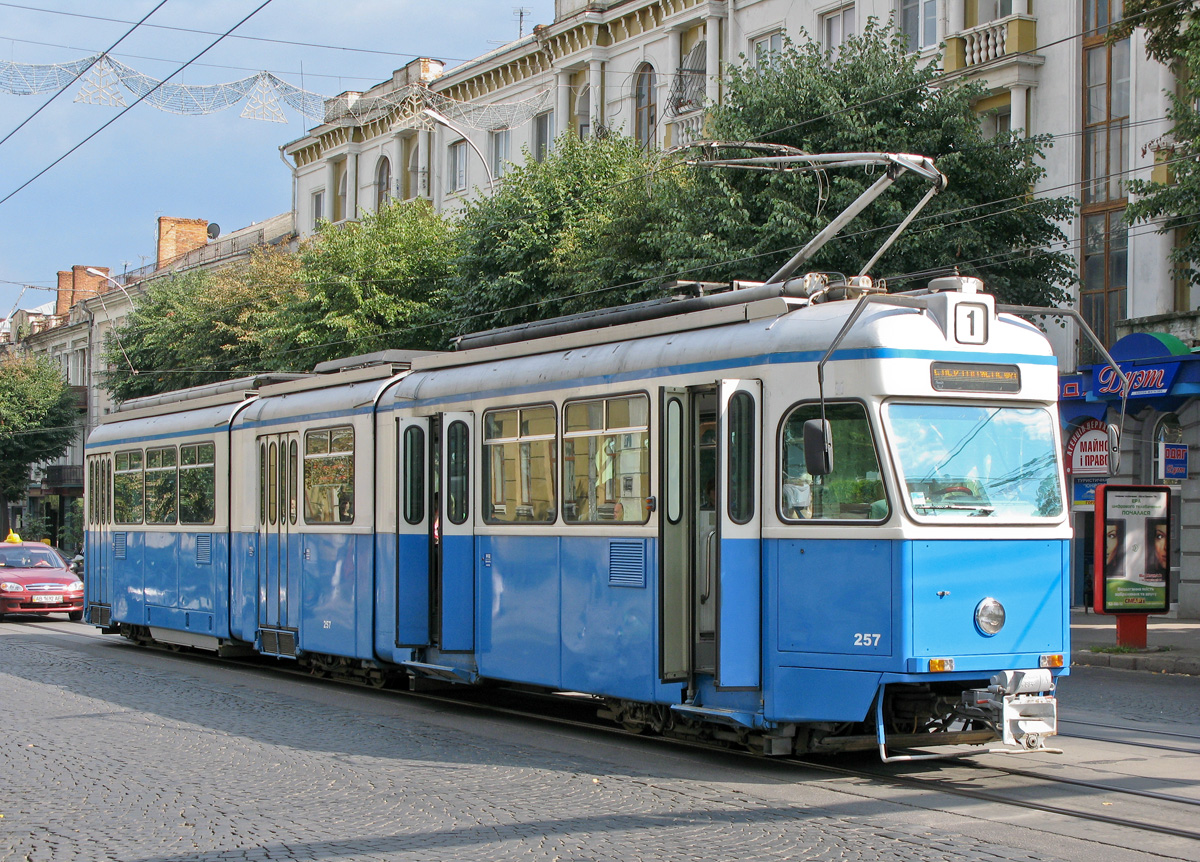
The most common fleet of Vinnytsia trams are ex-Zurich Mirage trams

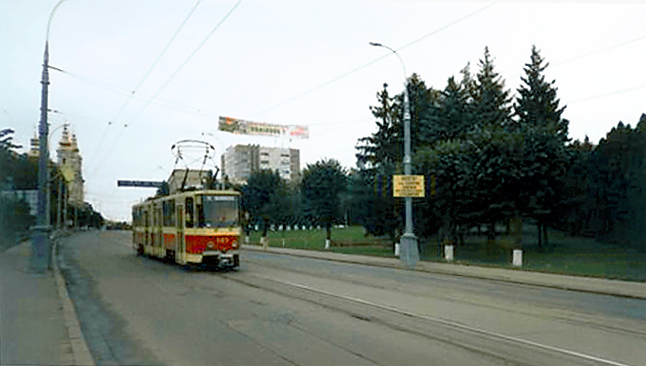
Prior to 2007 Czech-made Tatra trams were dominating in Vinnytsia

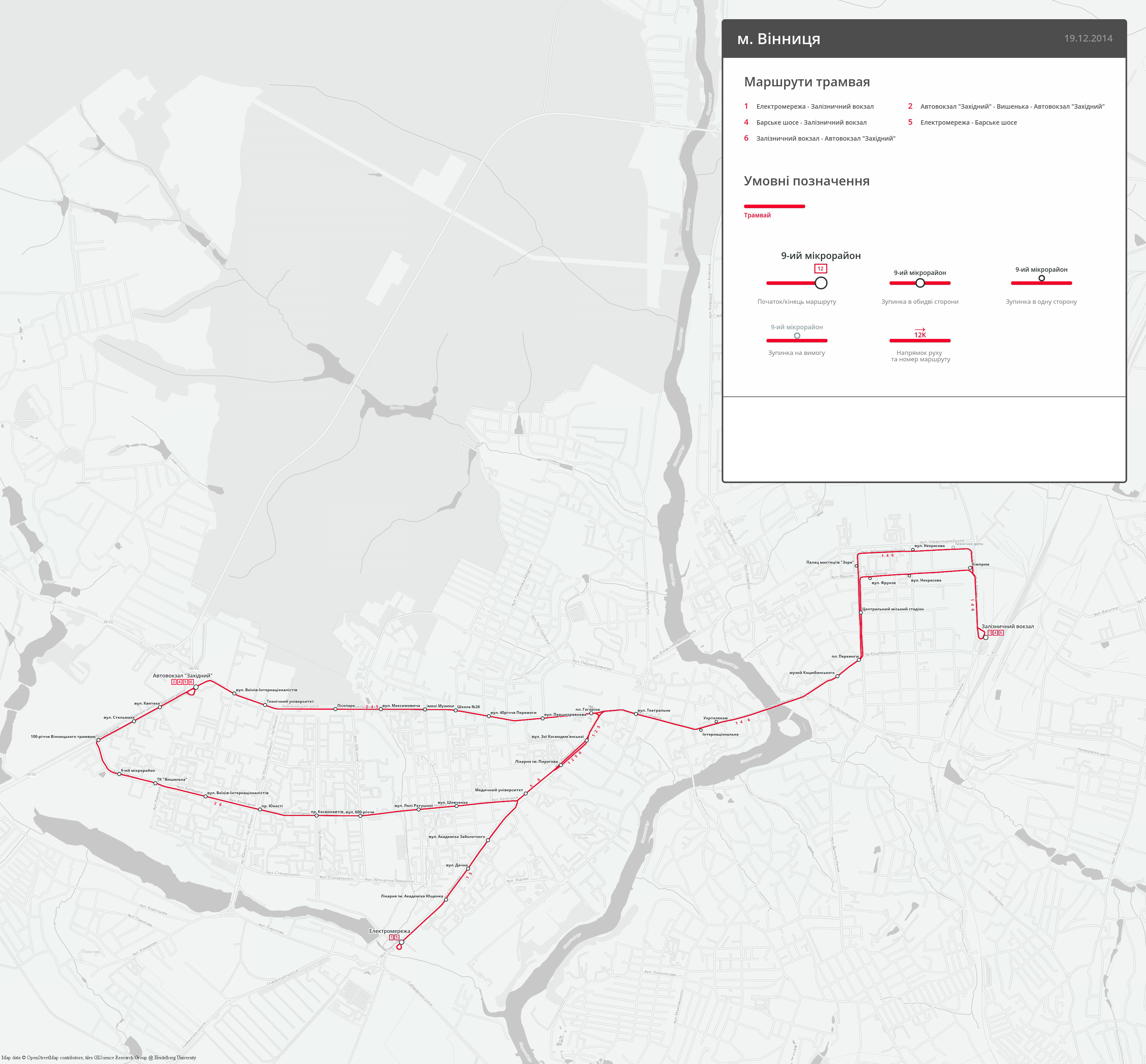
System map (2014)

The Vinnytsia Tramway (Ukrainian: Вінницький Трамвай, translit.: Vinnytskyi Tramvai) network is the part of the public transportation system that since 1913 serves Vinnytsia, the administrative center of the Vinnytsia Oblast, Ukraine. The tram system has a narrow rail gauge of 1,000 mm (3 ft 3 3/8 in) that only exists in Ukraine in the cities of Lviv, Zhytomyr and Yevpatoria, as well as Vinnytsia. The system currently consists of 21.2 km of tracks.

== History ==
The first electric tramway in Vinnytsia started to operate on 28 October 1913. The system was built by the German company MAN AG. The operation has only been suspended during two longer periods: February 1920 – 27 November 1921 and March 1944 – June 1945.

- Electric tram operation in Vinnytsia was commenced on 28 October 1913. 8.6 km long and 1,000 mm (3 ft 3 3/8 in) metre gauge wide line was laid along the central street (Nikolaevskiy Prospekt) from Women’s Gymnasium all the way to the railway station. Seven two-axle double sided trams worked there. They were manufactured by German plant MAN. There tram cars were encountered for 18 seating and 14 standing places.
- Tram depot was built on a right bank of South Bug river, next to the bridge (in the beginning of Pervomayskaya street). The repair shop was established in a tram depot.
- The railway branch was also lead here from a mainline.
- Prior to commencement of tram operation, 13 conductors, 15 tram driver, 3 foremen, and the same number of "blue collar workers" were accepted to their jobs. It is interesting that an average wage of a conductor was 25 rubles. CEO's wage was 50 rubles, and chief engineer's wage was 80 rubles.
- In the summer of 1914 a second line was erected, from Voznesenskaya Church to the "Military Townlet", along the Nikolaevsky Prospect (now 50th years of Victory Avenue). The total trackage extent was about 10.5 km. In order to serve the new line, four motor tram cars were manufactured by MAN plant. They were longer than previous ones (24 seats, and 16 standees). The operation on this line was commenced in September 1914.
- In November 1916 there were 24 employees and clerk in the Tram Operating Authority, as well as 17 conductors, and the same number of tram driver – totally 58 people.
- Fare for a tram ride was decently high, that’s why only high class people were able to use it. In 1917, after the revolution tram became more accessible form of transport for people. Civil war, which roared along the former USSR that time affected the work of Vinnytsia Tram.
- Tram bells revitalized streets of a small town of Vinnytsia; 6 tram cars were running and the electric power station was restored.
- In 1922 the tram operating company changed its name, it became registered as "Vinnytsia city electric enterprise" Within the same year 1922 tram traffic transported 1800 thousands of riders, in 1923–1633 thousands of riders. Out of 11 motor cars on property, 9 worked in inventory.

In 1932 single track line from Kalich Market to the Pirogov Hospital was built. Year later, second track was laid along that line. The turning point were organized at the place, that known now as an end of alley along Pirogov street. This alley existed in that years. The overall trackage length was 11.6 km. During the same year, some freight was also transported by tram from railway station to the city.

- In 1934 Vinnytsia received one used narrow gauge tram car from Dnipropetrovsk, and 4 from Odesa. It happened because these started to rebuild their tram trackages to wide gauge and the surplus of narrow gauge cars took place.

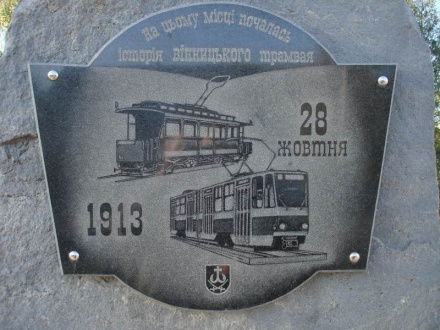
A token, commemorating Vinnytsia Tram

- From 20 July 1941 Vinnytsia was occupied by Nazi Germany. During this period, tram resumed in operation in 1942, but not in full. Merely one or two passenger trams ran through the town in one of its parts. In August 1943 trams traffic was resumed along the bridges over South Bug river, restored by the Germans. During this time grounding branch was built from an electric station to the coal storage. Its extend was 1.7 km.
- When the Germans started to leave the town of Vinnytsia they damaged the tram system strongly, as well as the town's electric supply.
- In 1950 «Vinnytsia Tram Authority» received about 15 used pre-war trams from Kyiv. They were rebuilt for narrow gauge tracks.
- 1953 tram network was broken on 2 parts because of the construction of a new central bridge over South Bug river. Also, new tram depot was built on Khmelnickiy Parkway in 1955.
- In 1957 the line along Pirogov street was extended from Pirogov's Hospital up to Medical Institute, and up to Yuscheno Hospital in 1958
- German cars, named Gota started to enter Vinnytsia in the mid-1950s, they mostly worked in couples: motor car plus trailer car.

In 1963 one of lines was extended from Revolutionary Street (now Cosmonauts Avenue), up to.;..... and to Barske Parkway in 1986 meanwhile route number 1 was extended to the electric power plant.

- Since 1971 4-axle Tatra-T4 trams started to enter Vinnytsia. They were much more convenient for passengers
- In the late 1970s the line which went along Kotsiubynsky Avenue was from Railway Station to Victory Square was transferred on Kirov Street
- In 1980s Vinnytsia received 81 Tatra KT4 trams. For a long time they were basic kind of trams in Vinnytsia.
- In 1992 the line to Vishenka district is fully open. The total extent of Tram Tracks in Vinnytsia in 42 km.
- In honor of 90th anniversary of tram in Vinnytsia, a memorial token was installed. It was made out of stone board, attached to the bigger stone.

== Tram Network Infrastructure ==
Tram tracks extend from the railway station (which is located in eastern part of the city) to the western outskirts of the city, through the center. Track gauge is 1,000 mm (3 ft 3 3/8 in) metre gauge.

- With the exception of a segment between a bridge over the South Bug river, following Sobornaya street, most trams lines are on reserved track. Due to this the average speed of trams is higher than that of buses, trolleybuses and other transport sharing the road.
- The main hub is located at Gagarin square.
- During the last years track improvements took place. They were done according to the European «noiseless tram» technology, reducing noise substantially.
- As per 2011 tracks are in good condition.
- The tram depot is located near the crossing of Khmelnitskoe Parkway, and Revolutionary Street.
- In summer 2008 construction of a new tram line began. The line was supposed to link Barske Parkway and Vishenka terminals. As per end of 2011 work on this extension is suspended. This extension finally opened on 19 December 2014.

== Routes ==
- Route № 1 «Railway Station — Electric Network»
- Route № 2 «Vyshen'ka — Barske Parkway»
- Route № 3 «Electric Network - Vyshen'ka — Barske Parkway»
- Route № 4 «Railway Station — Barske Parkway»
- Route № 5 «Electric Network — Barske Parkway»
- Route № 6 «Railway Station — Vyshen'ka»

== Rolling Stock ==
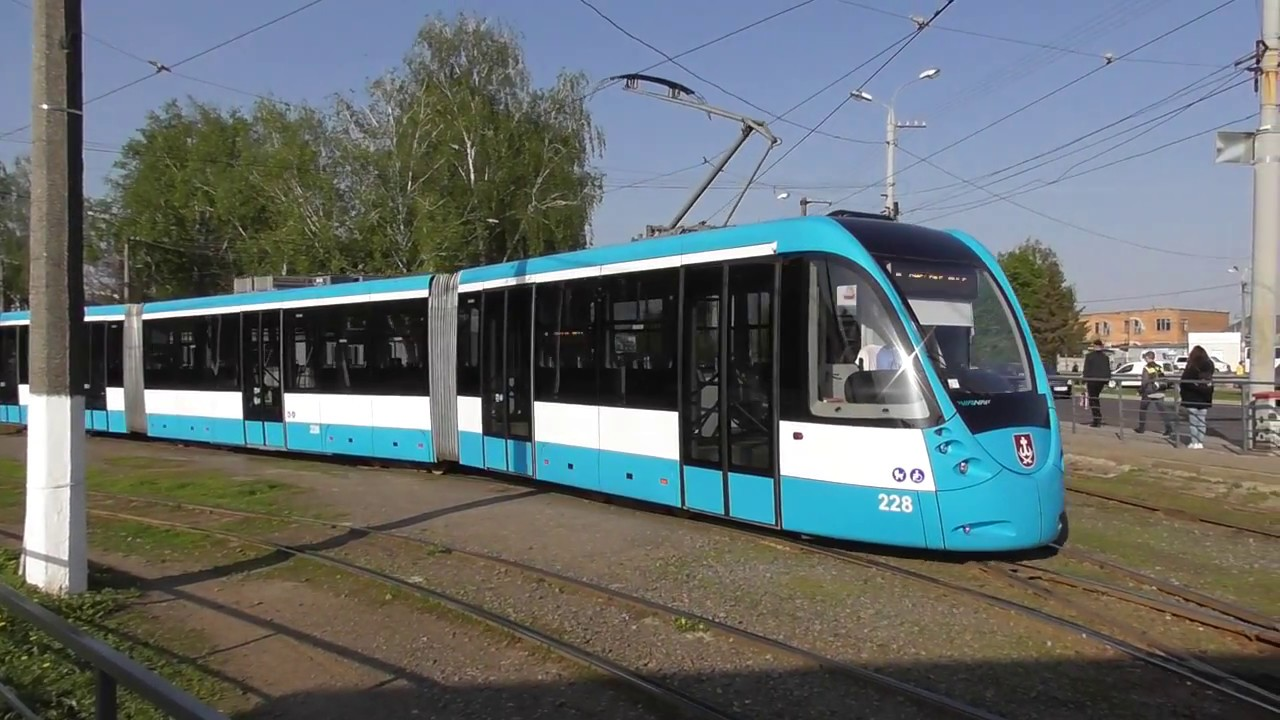
Modernized tram KT4UA Vinway

The most common kind of tram rolling stock in Vinnytsia are

- single ended articulated 6-axle motorized VBZ Be 4/6 Mirage trams, produced in Switzerland and previously worked in Zürich.
- single ended 4-axle VBZ Be 4/4 Karpfen trams, produced in Switzerland and previously worked in Zürich
- and some 2-section articulated 4-axle Tatra KT4SU trams produced by the Czech ČKD Tatra Works.

In nearest past many Tatra T4 trams were in use; now most of them are rebuilt into service trams for different purposes. GothaT57 tram is still kept.

Between 2005 and 2009 the city of Zürich replaced the trams of Verkehrsbetriebe Zürich (VBZ) built in the 1960s and 1970s with low floor Bombardier Cobras. The city of Zurich donated the surplus trams to the city of Vinnytsia, the cost of transport being paid by the Swiss government. In 2007 13 sets (motor and trailer car) of "Karpfen" series were transferred to Vinnytsia, and in 2008 the first couple of "Mirage" tram sets were transferred. Staff of Vinnytsia tramsways had been trained at workshops in Zurich, thus ensuring that the trams could continue to be maintained at their new owners.

- As of now, they are widely used on the tracks of Vinnytisa Tram network since mid-2007. They perform even better than well known Tatra КТ4SU trams.
- Given technology is already mastered by Vinnytsia TTA employees (both drivers and service specialists), and in spite of its respected age (produced sometime in the 60s), made city streets look much younger.
- Since 2011 Vinnytsia Tram and Trolleybus authority is planning to use mostly ex-Zurich trams, and leave up to 10 Tatra КТ4SU trams. As of January 2011 Vinnytsia received 105 tram cars from Zürich.

=== Current ===
Picture	Manufacturer	Model	Sections	Length, m	Seats	Produced	Low floor	Quantity	Since
	(Czech Republic) ČKD Tatra	KT4SU	2	18,1	34	1976-1988	0%	27	1981
	(Switzerland) SWS/MFO	Be 4/4 Karpfen	1	13,95	32	1959-1960	0%	13	2007
	(Switzerland) SIG/SWS/ MFO/BBC/SAAS	Be 4/6 Mirage	3	20,9	43/47	1966-1969	0%	75	2008
	(Czech Republic) ČKD Tatra (Ukraine) VTK	KT4MB VinWay; KT4UA VinWay	2; 3	20; 31	21; 60	2015; 2015-2018	0% 20%	1; 4	2015; 2015
	(Czech Republic) ČKD Tatra (Ukraine) VTK	T4UA VinWay	1	16	20	2015-2018	20%	5	2016
	(Switzerland) SWS/SWP/ BBC	Tram 2000	2	21,4	50	1976-1992	0%	35	2023

=== Historical ===
Picture	Manufacturer	Model	Quantity	Years
	(Germany) MAN		11	1913–1959
	(Russia) UKVZ (Ukraine) KZET	2M	15	1951–1977
	(Germany) LOWA	ET54	1	1955–1971
	(Germany) GWF	T57; T59E; T2-62	16; 12; 11	1957–1988; 1959–1988; 1962–1988
	(Czech Republic) ČKD Tatra	T4SU	42	1971–2007

=== Summary ===
- 60 trams come out in service, daily. Presently there are 60 trams and 103 trolleybuses in operation in Vinnytsia.

Tram's Make	MAN	К (С-900)	Lowa T54	Lowa B54	Gota T57	Gota B57	Gota T59	Gota B59	Gota T62	Gota B62	Tatra T4SU	Tatra KT4SU	Karpfen Be 4/4	Karpfen B4	Mirage Be 4/6	Mirage blind cow Be 4/6	FFA B4
Year Manufactured	1913—1950s	1951—1977	1955—1971	1955—1971	1957—1980s	1957—1980s	1959—1980s	1959—1980s	1962—1980s	1962—1980s	1971—2007	1981-…	2007-…	2007-…	2008-…	2008-…	2008-…
Quantity of Trams	11	15	1	1	16	13	12	12	11	11	42	80	14	15	29	3	11

=== Historical tram cars, listed in property ===
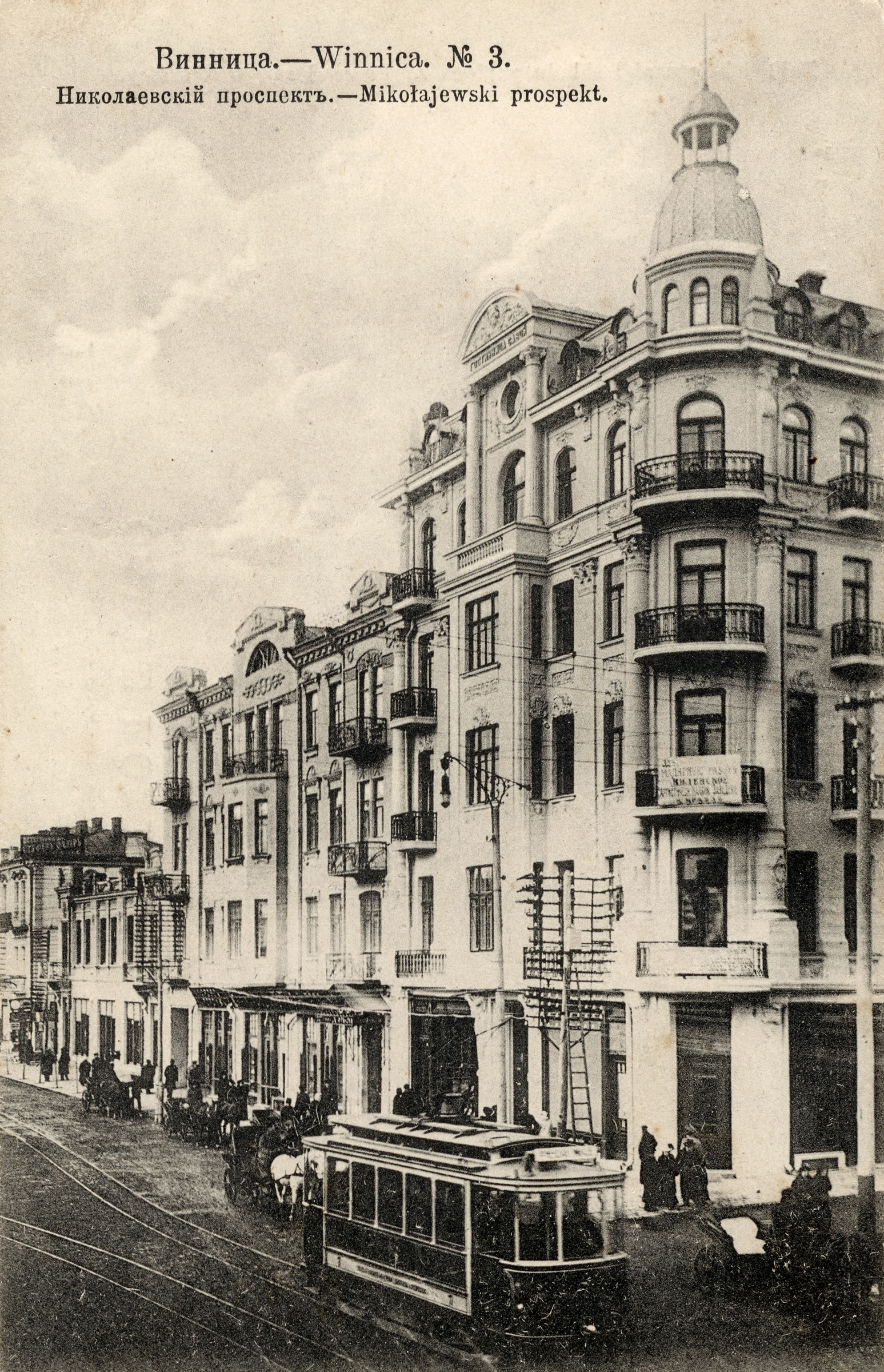
A tram outside Hotel Savoy in Vinnytsia in the mid-1910s.

- Retro-Tram. Generally speaking this construction has nothing common with trams in Vinnytsia. It was fabricated by forces of Vinnytsia Tram and Trolleybus Authority employees in 1988 due to the 75th anniversary of the commencement of tram operations in Vinnytsia. Only a bogie of a given tram was taken from German tram, named Gotha. But practically, this little tram for a couple of decades of its existence became a unique symbol of the city, similar to San Francisco Cable Car.
- Mock up monument to the first tram of Vinnytsia. Restored by the Vinnytsia Tram and Trolleybus Authority to the 90th anniversary of the commencement of the tram operation in Vinnytsia. It is situated in front of the administrative building of tram depot, on Khmelnitskiy Parkway. The first trams of Vinnytsia were namely like this one, manufactured by "MAN" plant in Nuremberg, Germany. There is a small museum of tram development history inside this little tram car.
- Gotha T-57 tramcar. This is the last one out of trams of this series which survived in Vinnytsia. Given tram was transferred to Vinnytsia in 1971 from Simferopol (since the tram operations were closed there in a given year). This tram was in service since 1985 and is a representative of a whole, more than 30-years long tram era in Vinnytsia. It was even not decommissioned, and until now has an inventory number 104.
