= Bombardier Cobra =

Tram model in Zürich built in the 2000s

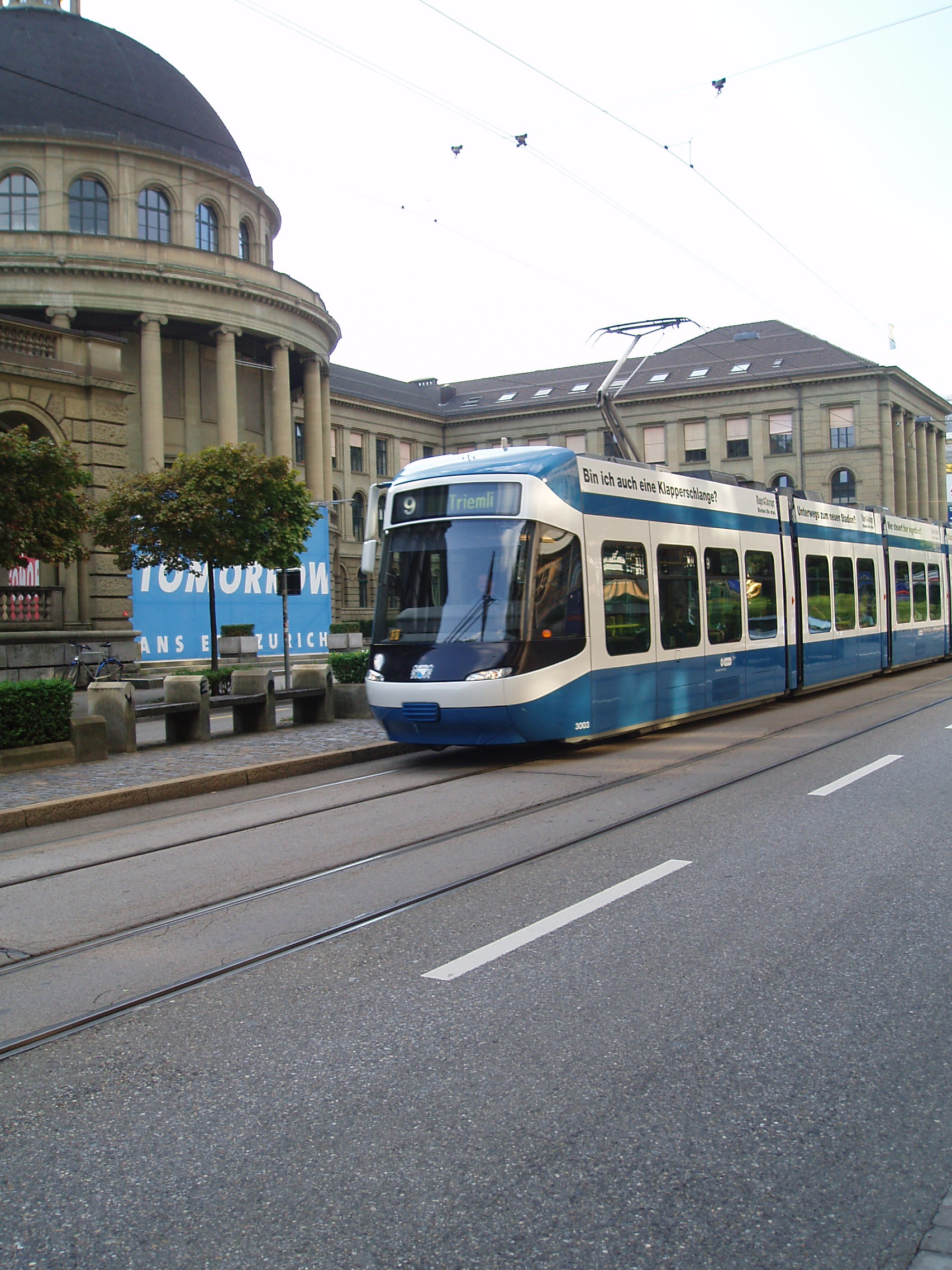
Cobra tram in front of the ETH, Zurich

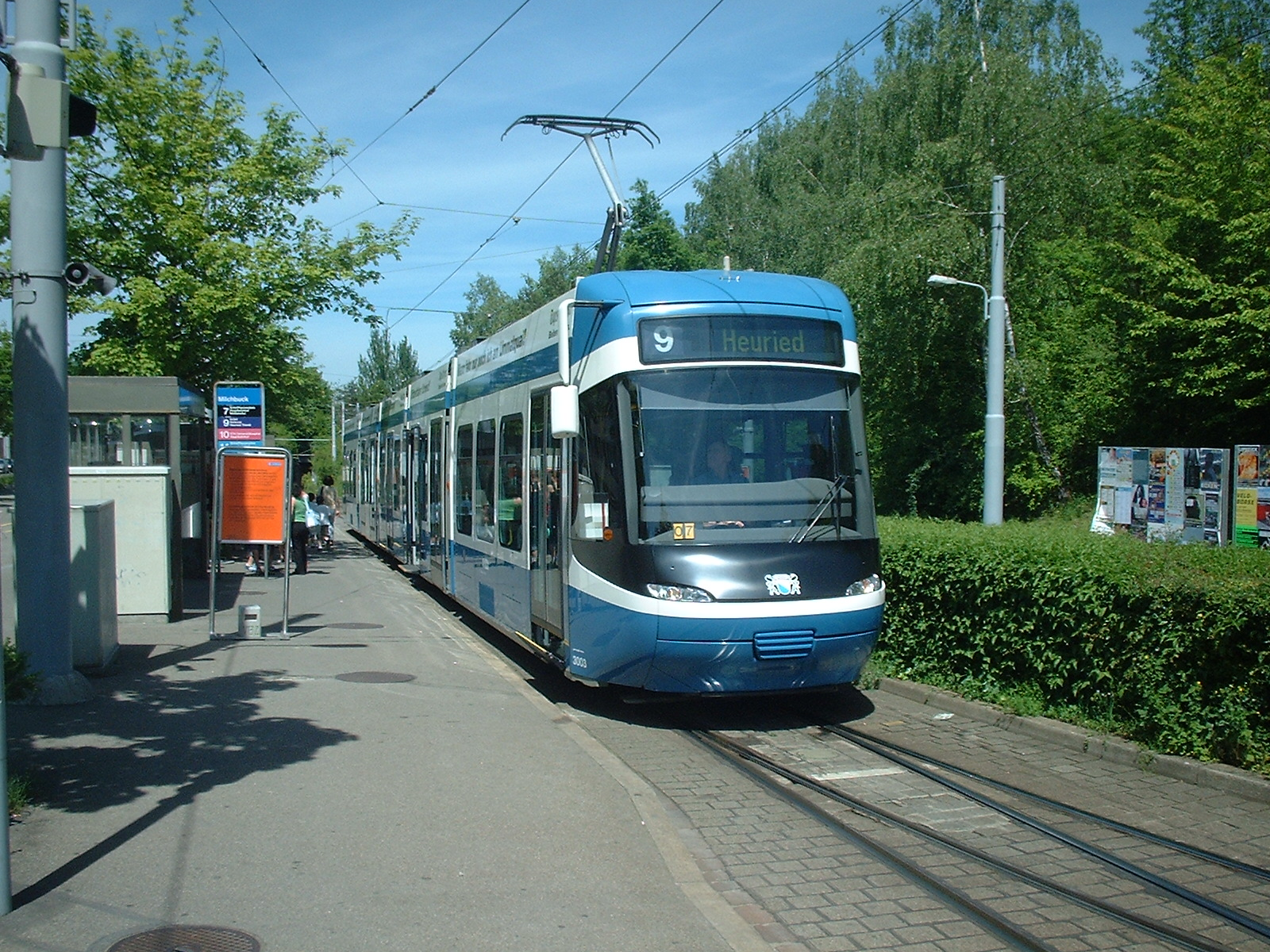
Cobra tram at Milchbuck, Zürich

The Bombardier Cobra is an articulated, low-floor tram operated by Verkehrsbetriebe Zürich (VBZ) of Zürich and manufactured by Bombardier Transportation. The Cobra was originally designed by a consortium consisting of the ABB, Pininfarina, the Schindler Group and Schweizerische Industrie Gesellschaft (SIG), who built several Cobra prototypes; however, all production Cobras have been manufactured by Bombardier.

As the first low-floor tram to operate on the local tram network, the tram originally only ran on a few lines, but is now used on most lines, alongside older and newer tram models.

== History ==
=== Initial concept ===
In 1992, a consortium of Swiss rolling stock manufacturers proposed a new design of low-floor articulated tram. The design was targeted for Zürich and Basel, but manufacturers hoped other tram operators would be interested.

The design of the tram was created by Pininfarina, an Italian coachbuilder. The design is based on short body segments, with four-wheel trucks under every second segment. Because the other segments do not have wheels, they are considered to float and are supported by adjacent segments. The wheel pairs of the trucks are not connected by axles but pivot individually and are steered into curves. It was hoped that this individual pivot design would reduce wear and noise and increase passenger comfort. The lack of axles permits a low floor throughout the vehicle. The wheel boxes are hidden under seats, as are the motors.

The running gear would have been designed and manufactured by Schweizerische Industrie Gesellschaft (SIG). The electrical equipment would have been supplied by ABB. The tram body would have been manufactured by Schindler Group, who proposed to make it from a synthetic material.

=== Prototype ===
In order to convince potential buyers and gain experience with the design, the manufacturing consortium set about creating a prototype. For this, Bern tram 401 was purchased. Its running gear was replaced and a new centre section was inserted. The prototype, which was numbered 3000, underwent extensive testing in both Zürich and Basel. The prototype tram also visited Augsburg and Helsinki for promotional purposes. The unit was ultimately scrapped in Basel.

=== Delays and modifications ===
Following various changes of policy in Zürich and Basel, there were no immediate orders for the tram. Meanwhile, the manufacturing consortium underwent numerous changes due to acquisitions and mergers within the industry. The sections of ABB and Schindler concerned with the Cobra design ultimately became part of Bombardier Transportation, with SIG becoming part of Alstom. Changes in management focus and some loss of expertise through downsizing activities affected the design. Following concerns over the suitability of the polymer construction, aluminium was chosen for the design.

Basel was lost as a potential customer when the city opted for the Combino design by Siemens. The Cobra consortium, however, won an order to supply six prototypes to Zürich.

=== Prototypes in Zürich ===
In 2001, the six prototypes (3001-3006) for VBZ in Zurich began test operations. The prototypes were five-section versions of the design. The prototypes were withdrawn from operation when cracks started to appear in the drive mechanisms. There were also concerns about the noise levels both within and outside the new trams which lead to additional noise reduction measures. The Cobra had earned itself the unfortunate nickname "rattlesnake" in the Zürich press. Since 2002, the six Cobra trams have been operated on lines 4 and 9 with occasional appearances on line 6.

Following the loss of business to Combino, the design of Cobra was reassessed and it was found necessary to modify the construction again. The consortium also decided to add air conditioning to the tram design.

=== Production units ===
After testing, VBZ confirmed an order for 68 production units (3007-3074). Delivery of the new units began in 2005 and was completed in 2009, replacing almost all of the rolling stock that was pre-Tram 2000. VBZ had an option to order up to 35 additional units and decided to order another 14 units (3075-3088). The additional trams would be needed for new services such as Tram Zürich West and Phase 2 of Stadtbahn Glattal.

The six prototypes (3001-3006) were rebuilt to the standards of the production units.

== Controversy ==
The introduction of the low-floor tram series has had a long and difficult history. The original orders were placed in 1996. Many questioned the choice of Schindler's Cobra over the already tested Combino series from Siemens which had been selected by both Basel and Bern. VBZ justified the decision to order the trams because of the length of the carriage and compatibility with the existing Zürich tram network. However, from 5 March 2010, the Red Demonstrator, a new bright red seven-segment Combino tram (Bern 659), showed itself off to the public of Zürich. The Red Demonstrator ran in regular service on line 11 until 12 April.

The first models of the Cobra prototype were delivered in May 2001 after organisational changes within Schindler, Adtranz and Bombardier caused delays and renegotiations. The subsequent problems with structural weakness and noise within the new trams caused them to be quickly withdrawn from service. The manufacturers endeavoured to terminate the orders and in 1999 Adtranz had vigorously pleaded with the VBZ to replace the vehicles and future orders with the Eurotram. The VBZ insisted on the unique Cobra design features and styling, so the Cobra survived.

Since 2002 the six prototype vehicles have proven themselves successful and the teething troubles were overcome. The go-ahead has long since been given to expand the fleet to at least 88 trams by the end of 2010. However, the VBZ has stated that future orders will be for a type that has already been built for other systems. In short, there will be no more Cobras except for those ordered.
