= Affoltern railway station =

Affoltern railway station may refer to the following in Switzerland:

- Affoltern am Albis railway station, in Affoltern am Albis, canton of Zürich
- Affoltern-Weier railway station, in Affoltern im Emmental, canton of Bern
- Zürich Affoltern railway station, in the city of Zürich, formerly "Affoltern bei Zürich railway station"
