= Verkehrsbetriebe Zürich =

Public transport company in Zurich, Switzerland

Verkehrsbetriebe Zürich (VBZ)

Overview
- Owner: City of Zurich
- Transit type: Light rail; Bus; Trolleybus; Funicular
- Annual ridership: 309,100,000 (2025)
- Website: stadt-zuerich.ch/vbz

Operation
- Began operation: May 1896 (130 years ago)

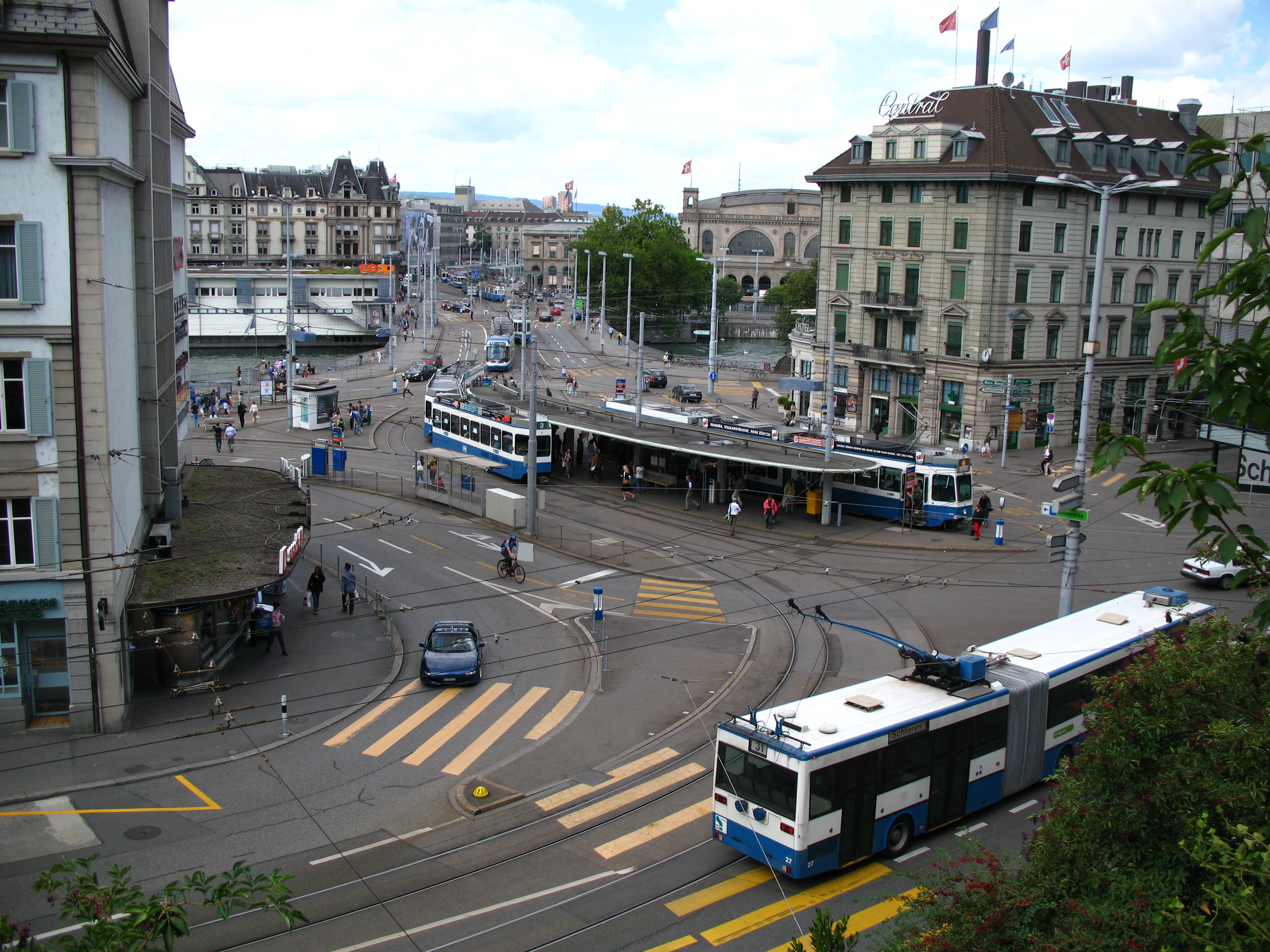
VBZ trams and buses at Central, a public square and transit node

Verkehrsbetriebe Zürich (VBZ) is a public transport operator in the Swiss city of Zurich, and is wholly owned by the city. Previously known as the Städtische Strassenbahn Zürich (StStZ), the organisation was founded in 1896 and adopted its current name in 1950.

The VBZ owns and operates trams, trolleybuses, buses, and a funicular. It also operates, but does not own a further funicular, a rack railway, and the Stadtbahn Glattal light rail system.

All of VBZ's passenger services are operated within the tariff and ticketing system provided by the cantonal public transport authority Zürcher Verkehrsverbund (ZVV). The ZVV tariff also covers other passenger transport services in and around the city, including the Zurich S-Bahn, although these are not operated by the VBZ.

== History ==
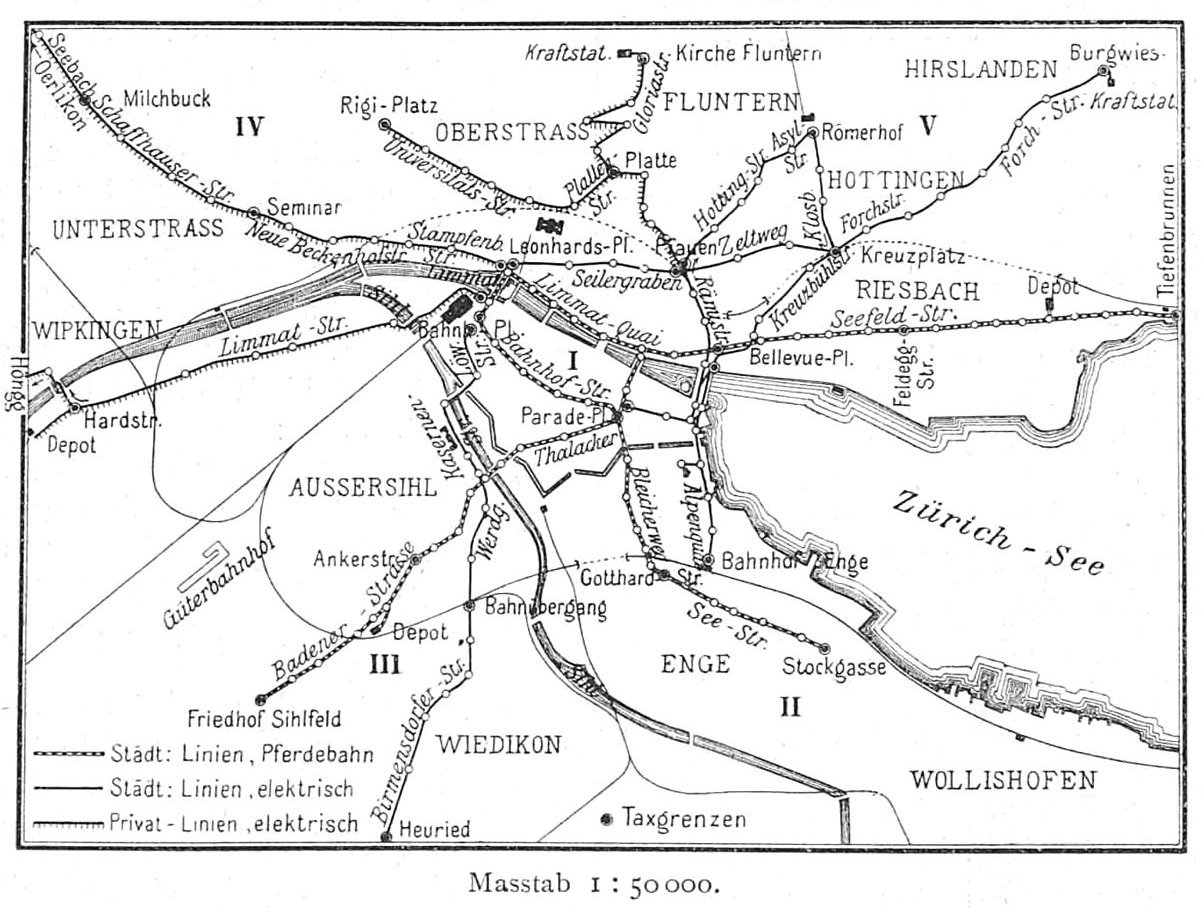
The mix of tram routes in 1899

The Städtische Strassenbahn Zürich (StStZ) came into existence in 1896, when the city of Zurich purchased the Elektrische Strassenbahn Zürich (ESZ). However privately owned tram systems had operated in the city since 1882, and private and public operation of tram systems within the city continued in parallel until 1931, with the StStZ gradually acquiring the private sector companies.

In 1927, the StStZ introduced its first motor bus route, and in 1939, this was joined by the first trolleybus route. In 1940, the StStZ started a modernisation of its trams, introducing the first prototypes of the Swiss Standard Tram. Despite Switzerland's neutrality, the economic effects of the Second World War slowed down the program, but by 1953, the VBZ had taken delivery of 177 such trams.

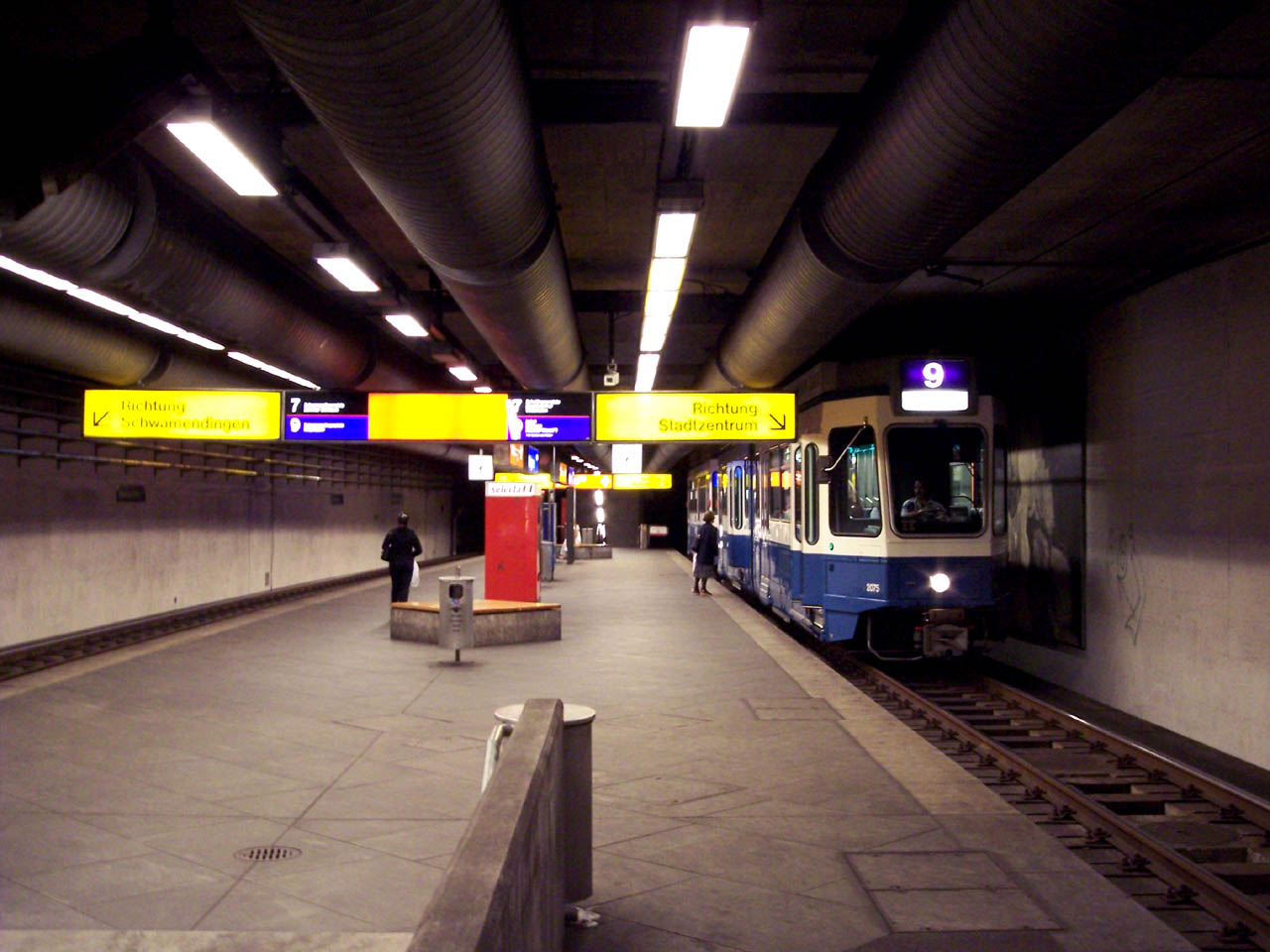
A station built for the abortive U-Bahn

In 1950, the StStZ changed its name to the Verkehrsbetriebe der Stadt Zürich (VBZ) to reflect the broader nature of its services. This name was further refined to Verkehrsbetriebe Zürich in 1978, with the use of the name VBZ Züri-Linie in some marketing contexts.

In 1962, a proposal for a metro or U-Bahn network was rejected by Zurich voters, a rejection that was repeated in 1973. This notwithstanding, several stretches of U-Bahn were built but never opened. Today, one such stretch is used by the VBZ tram network, whilst another is used as the terminus of the Sihltal Zürich Uetliberg Bahn (SZU) at Zürich Hauptbahnhof station.

In 1990, the VBZ became a partner of the Zurich Transport Network or Zürcher Verkehrsverbund (ZVV), a body which coordinates public transport provision and tariffs throughout the canton of Zurich. In 2006, the first phase of the Stadtbahn Glattal opened, with further phases opening in 2008 and 2010. In 2011, the city tram network was extended by the opening of the Zürich West project.

== Operations ==
=== Trams ===
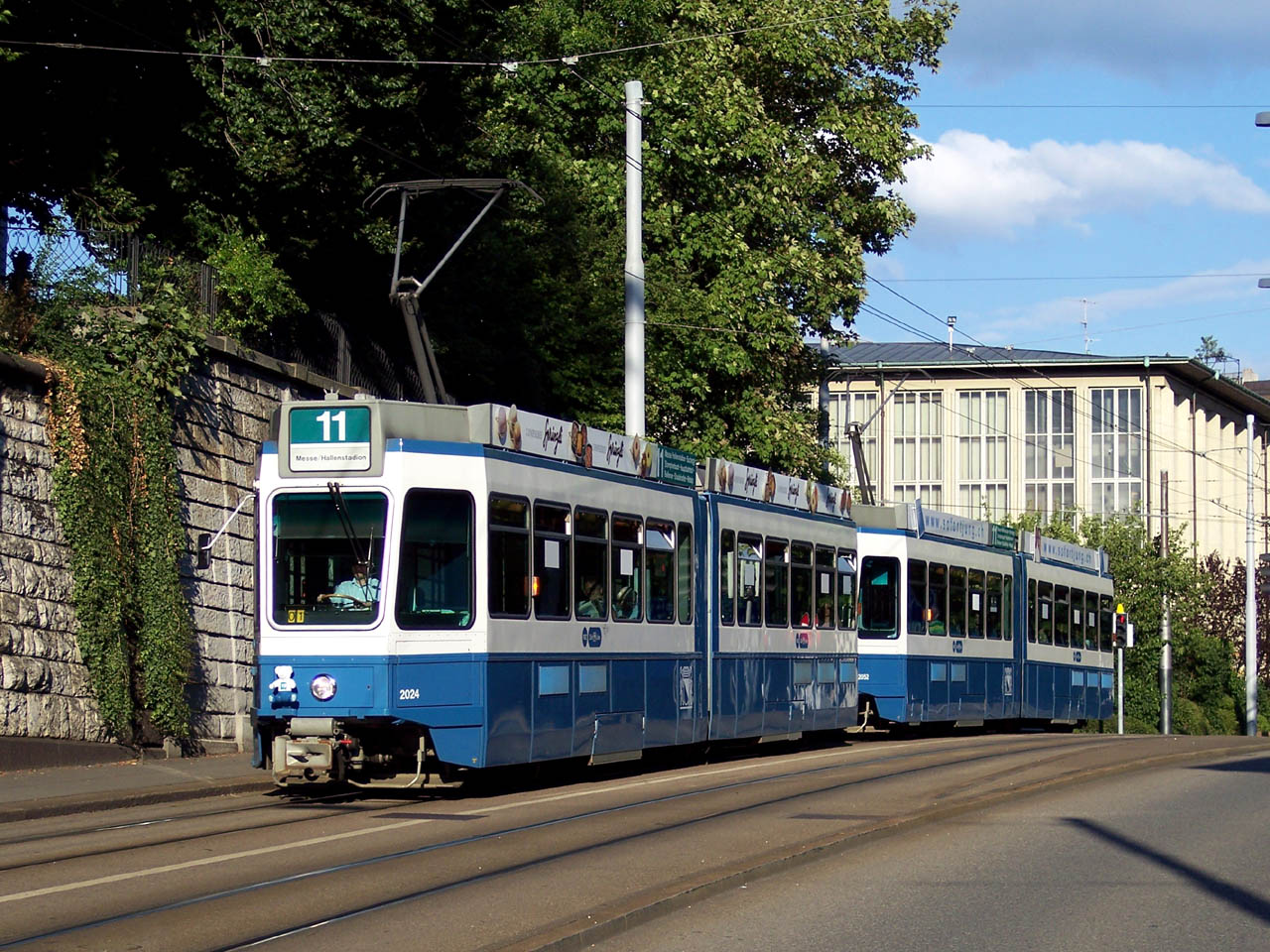
A pair of two-section Tram 2000 trams on typical VBZ street track

Trams make an important contribution to public transport in the city, with the tram network serving most city neighbourhoods, and are the backbone of public transport within the city. Most of the tram lines run from city periphery to city periphery via the city centre.

The VBZ owns the tram infrastructure within the city, and operates trams both over its own infrastructure and over the infrastructure of the Stadtbahn Glattal, a light rail system situated to the north of the city and owned by the Verkehrsbetriebe Glattal (VBG). Whilst some of the lines operated over the Stadtbahn Glattal are branded as VBG lines, all such services are actually operated by the VBZ under contract to the VBG.

The joint tram network of the VBZ and VBG comprises 15 separate lines: 2, 3, 4, 5, 6, 7, 8, 9, 10, 11, 12, 13, 14, 15 and 17 (lines 10 and 12 are jointly operated with VBG, and line 20 is operated by AVA). The former tram line 1 was later converted into trolleybus line 31. Due to the construction work at Bahnhofquai/HB tram stop between 14 December 2025 and 12 December 2026, the temporary Baulinien, 'construction lines' 50 and 51 were created to take over the disconnected parts in the northern network of the lines 4, 11, 13, and 14. The network operates on meter gauge track, electrified using overhead line at 600 V DC. The VBZ infrastructure is largely street based, with varying degrees of segregation from other street traffic but little use of dedicated rights of way for the trams with the notable exception of a tram tunnel in north-east Zurich that was originally built for an abortive metro system, and modified for tram usage. By contrast, on VBG infrastructure, VBZ trams operate on long stretches of dedicated track.

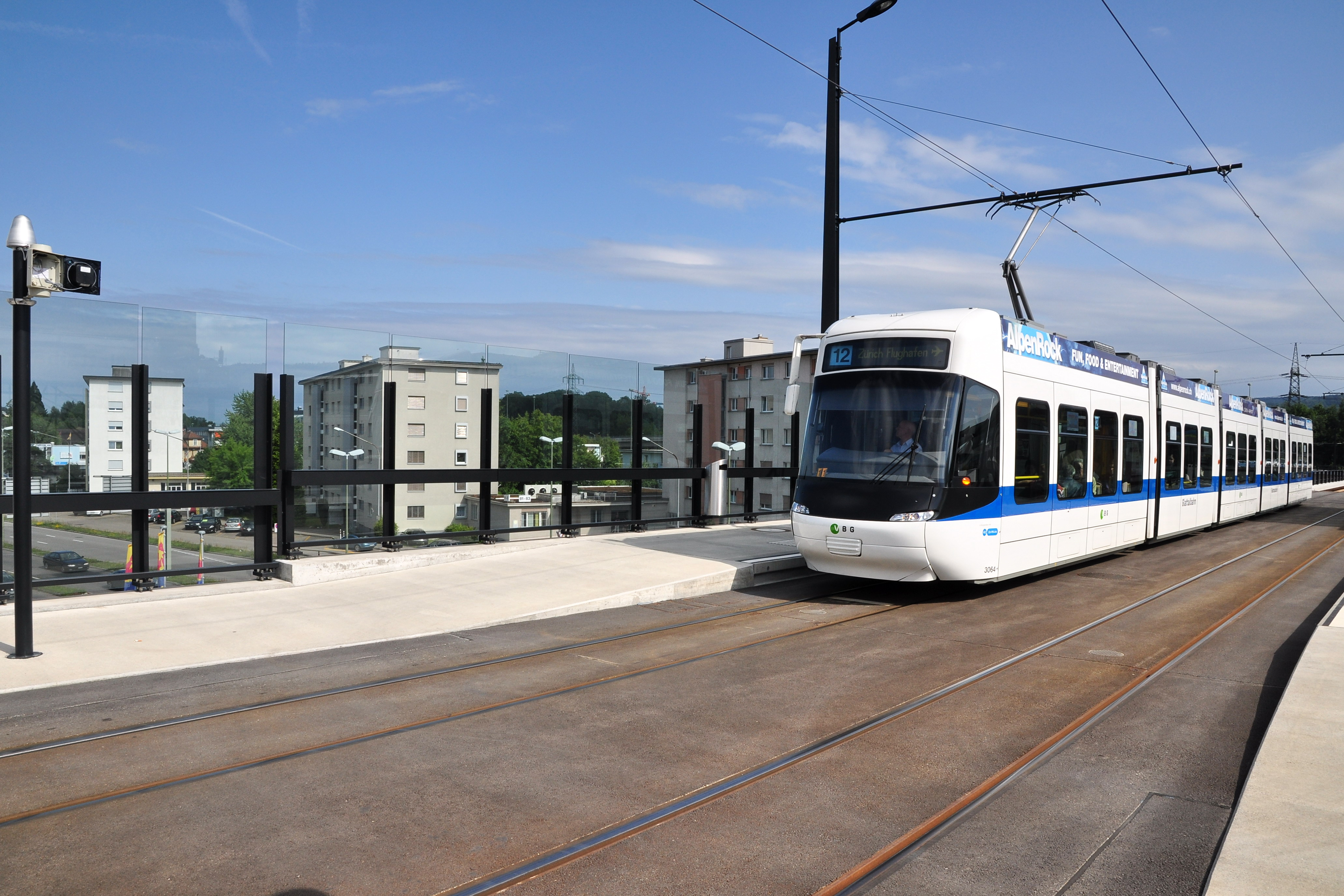
A Bombardier Cobra low-floor tram in VBG livery on Stadtbahn Glattal right of way

The independent Forchbahn (FB) railway uses VBZ trackwork to reach the centre of Zurich from the eastern edge of the city. The FB trains operate largely in the street for this section of their route, sharing track with VBZ tram lines, but are categorised as part of the city's S-Bahn railway network rather than as part of the tram network. Two membership associations, the Zurich Tram Museum and the Aktion Pro Sächsitram, also use VBZ tracks to operate occasional heritage tram services.

The VBZ owns 313 tram vehicles, which between them cover over 16 million vehicle-kilometres per year. Of these, 88 are modern low-floor Bombardier Cobra trams delivered between 2001 and 2010. All the remaining trams in regular passenger service are of the Tram 2000 design, of which 201 vehicles were delivered between 1976 and 1992. Whilst the Tram 2000 is a high-floor design, 23 trams have been rebuilt with the addition of a low-floor centre section. Unlike the five-section Cobras, which normally only operate singularly, the Tram 2000 vehicles are composed of one, two, or (in the case of rebuilt units) three sections, and in most cases operate in multiple.

The tram network carries 202 million passengers trips per year, adding up to 368 million passenger-kilometres.

=== Trolleybuses ===
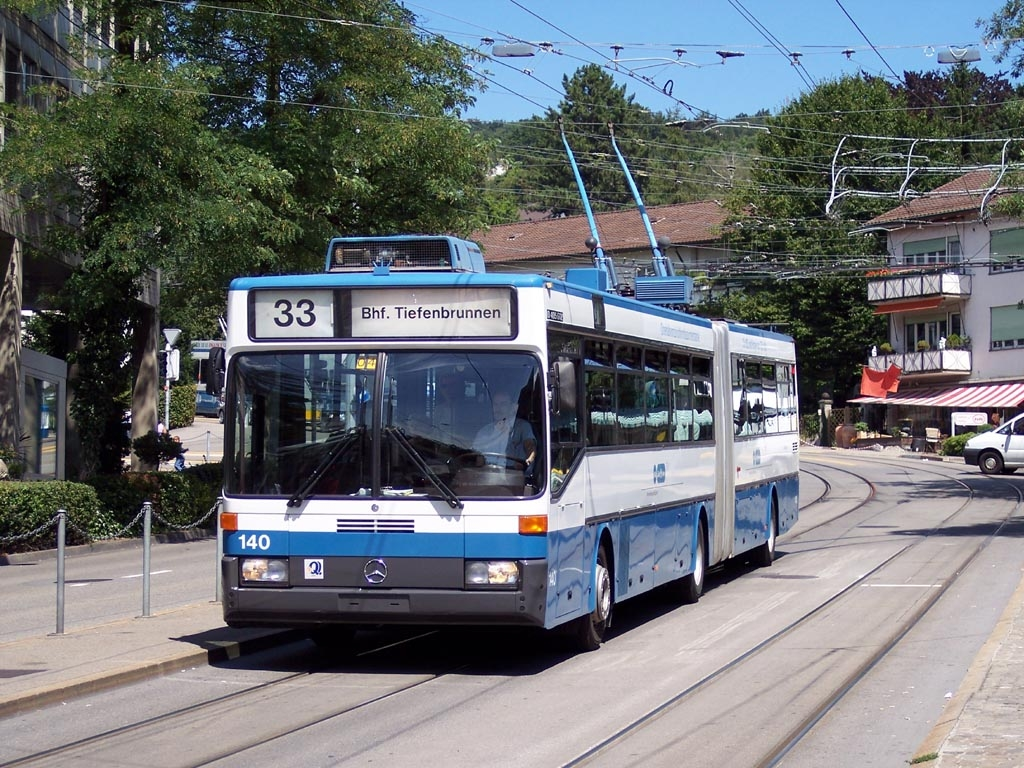
A Mercedes-Benz O405 GTZ trolleybus

The city's tram lines are supported by 6 trolleybus lines (31, 32, 33, 46, 72, 83; line 34 was subsumed into line 31 in 2017), with a total route length of 54.0 km (33.6 mi). As with the city's tram lines, most of the trolleybus lines run from suburb to suburb, although their penetration of the city centre is less complete than the trams. Like the tram network, the trolleybus network is electrified using overhead line at 600 V DC, and shares a common electrical supply infrastructure.

Service is provided by 80 trolleybuses, which between them cover over 5 million vehicle-kilometres per year. All the city's trolleybuses are articulated buses, with 17 being extra-long double-articulated vehicles. All the double-articulated vehicles, along with a further 18 of the single-articulated units, are low floor.

The trolleybus network carries 54 million passengers trips per year, adding up to 119 million passenger-kilometres.

=== Motor buses ===
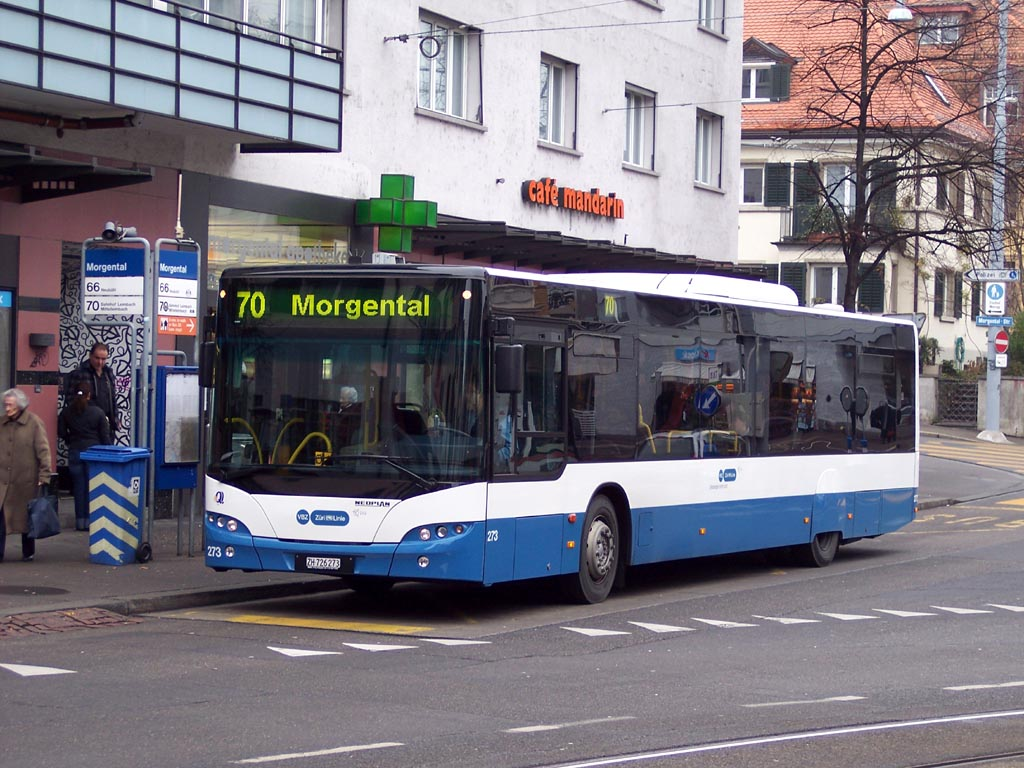
A Neoplan N 4516 motor bus

As of 2013, the VBZ operated 59 motor bus lines. The bus lines can be broken down into urban routes (18 lines), district routes (9 local minibus operated feeder lines within the city) and regional routes (32 lines in the region around the city).

As of 2025, the VBZ operates 113 motor buses, of which 19 are standard buses, 86 are articulated buses and 8 are minibuses. The fleet consists of 49 Neoplan N 4516 (all articulated), 50 Mercedes Citaro (19 standard, 31 articulated), and 14 MAN buses (6 articulated Lions City, 8 A35 midibuses).

VBZ buses on the urban routes cover just under 6 million vehicle-kilometres a year per year, with district routes adding a further 1 million vehicle-kilometres and regional routes contributing 2 million vehicle-kilometres. Additionally, much of the regional service is provided by contractors operating on behalf of the VBZ, with such services covering a further 4 million vehicle-kilometers per year.

The urban motor bus network carries 37 million passengers trips per year, adding up to 75 million passenger-kilometres. The district bus network carries 2 million passengers trips per year, adding up to 3 million passenger-kilometres. The regional bus network carries 20 million passengers trips per year, adding up to 62 million passenger-kilometres.

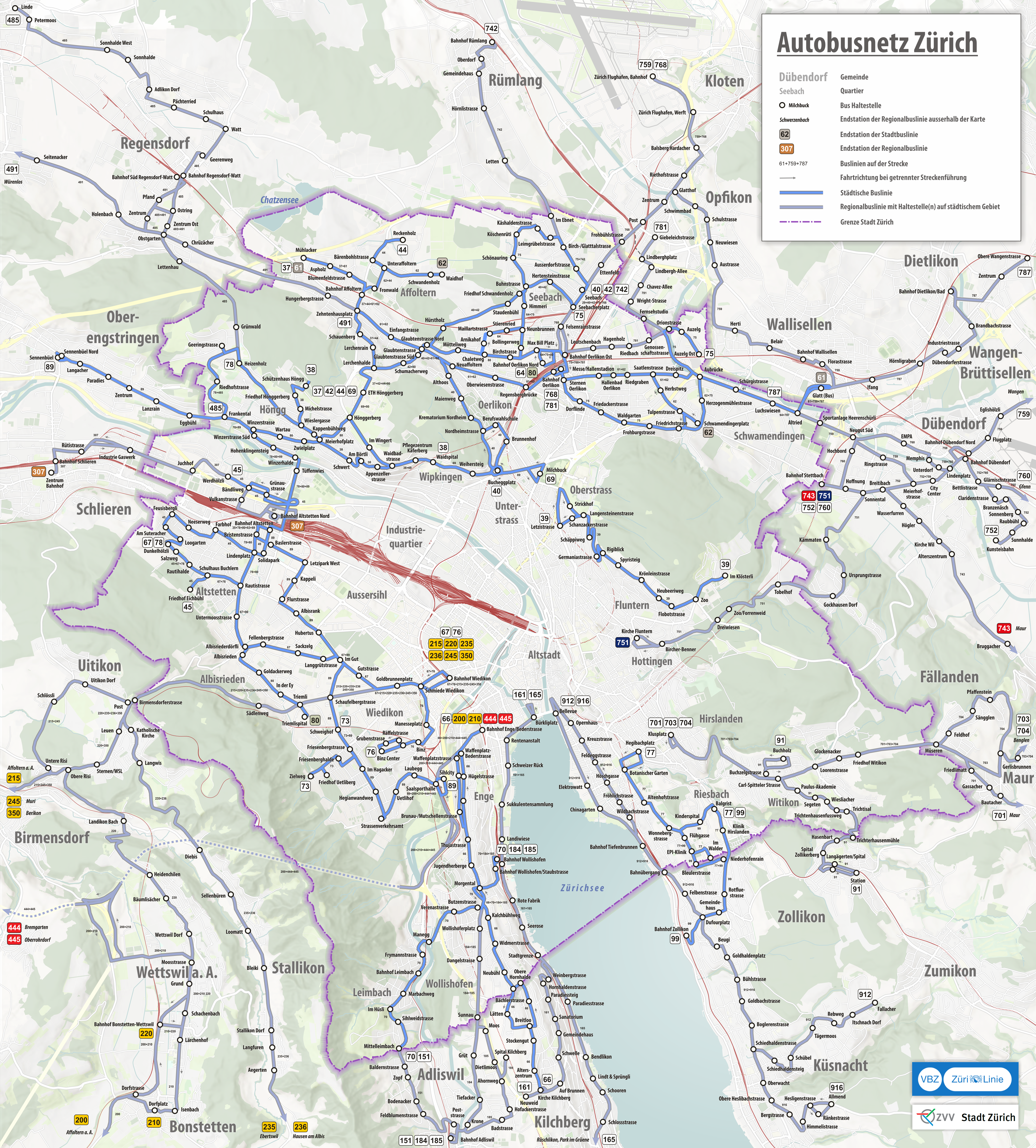
Motorbus network, (As of 14 December 2025)

Zurich city bus lines
Line	Route
37	Mühlacker – Bhf. Affoltern – ETH Hönggerberg
38	Waidspital – Schützenhaus Höngg
39	Letzistrasse – Zoo – Im Klösterli
40	Seebach – Glaubtenstrasse – Bucheggplatz
42	Seebach – Glaubtenstrasse – ETH Hönggerberg
44	Reckenholz – Bhf. Affoltern – ETH Hönggerberg
45	Werdhölzli – Bhf. Altstetten – Friedhof Eichbühl
61	Mühlacker – Bhf. Affoltern – Bhf. Oerlikon – Glatt
62	Waidhof – Bhf. Affoltern – Bhf. Oerlikon – Schwamendingerplatz
64	Bhf. Oerlikon Nord – Maillartstrasse – Bhf. Oerlikon Nord (circuit)
66	Bhf. Enge/Bederstrasse – Kilchberg, Kirche
67	Bhf. Wiedikon – Dunkelhölzli
69	Milchbuck – Bucheggplatz – ETH Hönggerberg
70	Bhf. Wollishofen – Manegg – Mittelleimbach
73	Schweighof – Zielweg
75	Seebacherplatz – Bhf. Oerlikon Ost – Auzelg Ost
76	Bhf. Wiedikon – Binz Center
77	Hegibachplatz – Balgrist
78	Heizenholz – Bhf. Altstetten – Dunkelhölzli
80	Bhf. Oerlikon Nord – ETH Hönggerberg – Bhf. Altstetten – Triemlispital
89	Sihlcity – Saalsporthalle – Schweighof – Bhf. Altstetten – Unterengstringen, Sennenbüel
91	Buchholz – Zentrum Witikon – Zollikerberg
99	Balgrist – Zollikon, Bahnhof
161	Bürkliplatz – Kilchberg, Neuweid
165	Bürkliplatz – Rüschlikon, Park im Grüene
184	Bhf. Wollishofen – Adliswil, Bahnhof
185	Bhf. Wollishofen – Adliswil, Bahnhof
307	Bhf. Altstetten Nord – Schlieren, Zentrum/Bahnhof
701	Klusplatz – Ebmatingen, Looren
703	Klusplatz – Pfaffhausen, Müseren
704	Klusplatz–Schwerzenbach, Bahnhof (– Volketswil, Hofwisen)
751	Kirche Fluntern – Bhf. Stettbach

=== Funiculars and rack railways ===
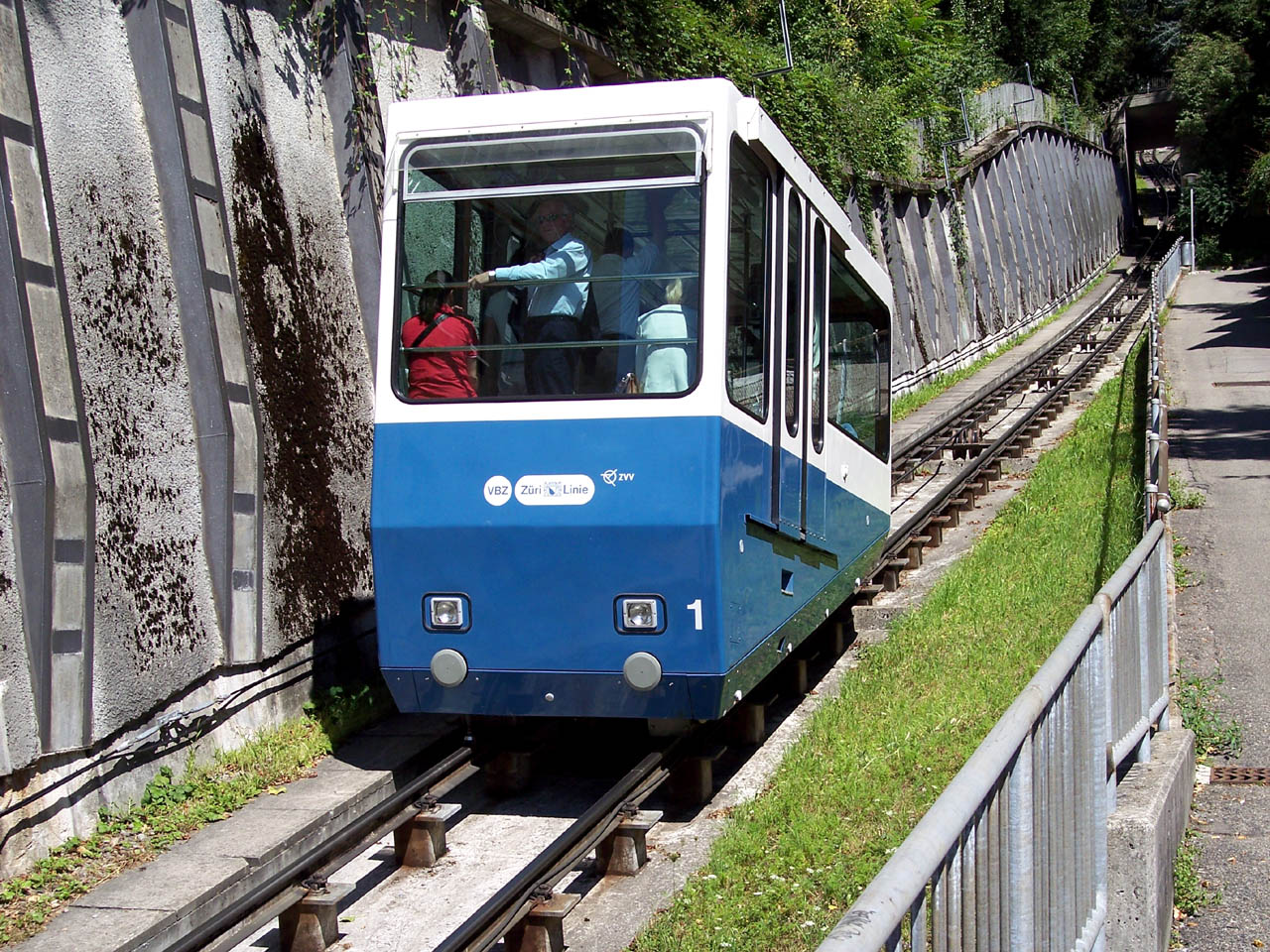
The Seilbahn Rigiblick

The VBZ operates two funiculars and one rack railway within the city of Zurich:

- The Rigiblick funicular, in the north-east of the city, connects a lower station served by tram and trolley bus lines with an upper station at Rigiblick on the Zürichberg hill. It is both owned and operated by the VBZ.
- The Polybahn funicular, in the centre of the city, links the city centre with the university. It is operated by the VBZ on behalf of its owners, the banking group UBS AG.
- The Dolderbahn rack railway, in Zurich's eastern suburbs, connects a lower station served by trams with an upper station adjacent to the Dolder Grand Hotel. It is operated by the VBZ on behalf of its owners, the Dolderbahn-Betriebs AG.

=== Tariffs and tickets ===
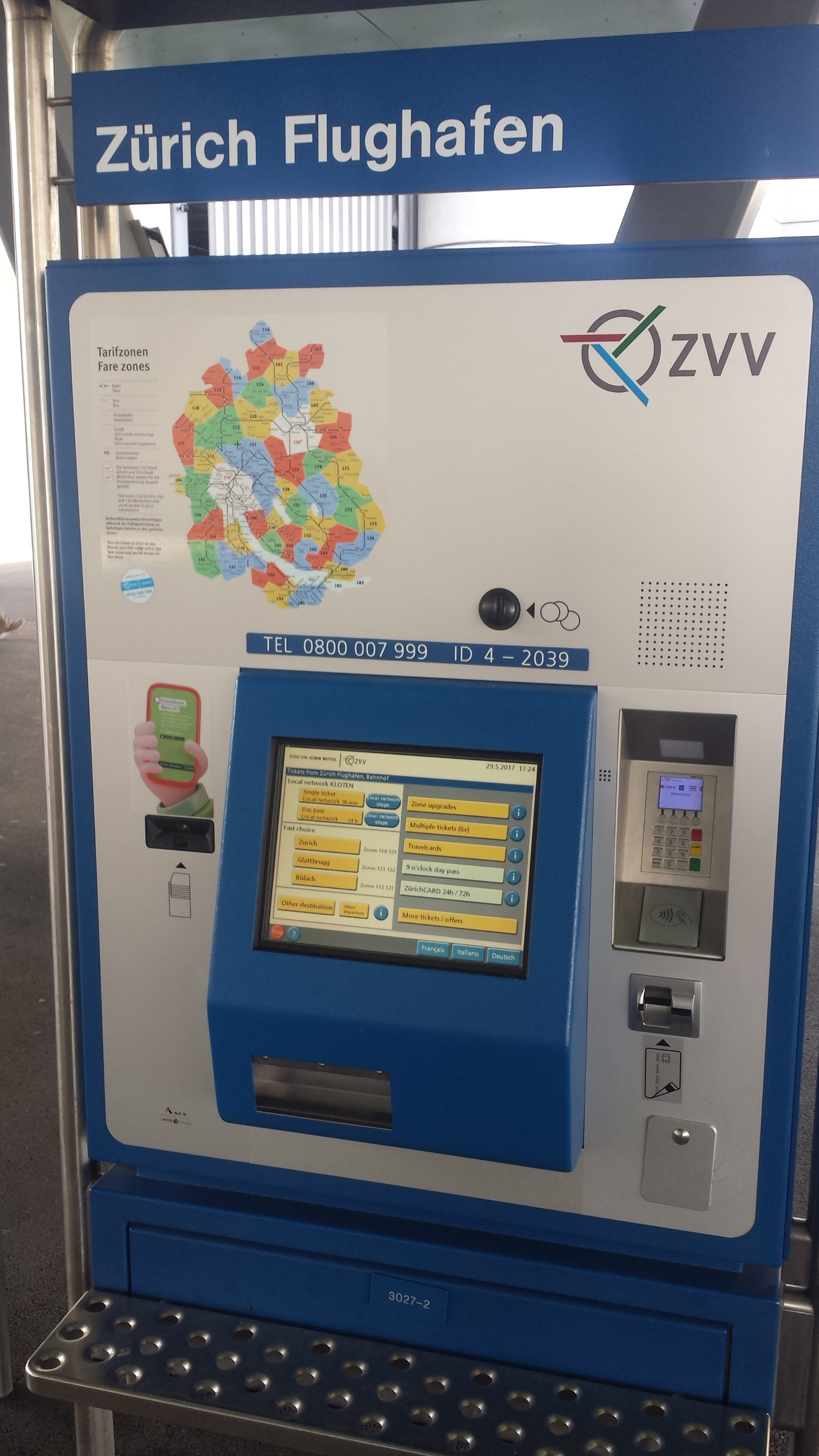
Ticket machine

All services operated by the VBZ operate on a proof-of-payment system. Passengers are required to purchase a ticket before boarding any vehicle. Passengers may board through any door and are not required to show tickets on boarding.

Tickets may be purchased from machines found at all of the VBZ's tram stops, and many bus stops. At bus stops without ticket machines, passengers without tickets must board through the front door and purchase a ticket from the driver. Ticket checks are randomly carried out by roving teams of fare inspectors, and penalties are imposed on passengers found without a valid ticket.

VBZ's passenger services are operated within the tariff and ticketing system provided by the cantonal public transport authority Zürcher Verkehrsverbund (ZVV). This system covers the whole of the canton of Zurich and thus covers travel on services provided by many other operators, and includes the Zurich S-Bahn suburban rail network. Free transfer is permitted between different vehicles, lines, modes and operators, provided a ticket valid for the whole journey is held.

The ZVV system is zonal in nature, with fares for individual journeys set by the zones the journey passes through. Not all zones are equal, with higher fares being charged for travel in some zones. The whole of the city of Zurich is within a single zone, but as some VBZ lines travel beyond the city boundaries, a multi-zone ticket is needed for some VBZ journeys. Both single journey and day tickets are available, as are a number of passes with longer validities.

=== Other activities ===
Besides its passenger transport activities, VBZ, jointly with the city refuse and recycling department ERZ, operates the cargo tram to collect bulky waste. The cargo tram serves 9 different collection points around Zurich, calling at each on different days of the month. The collected refuse is taken to a specially constructed siding at the ERZ yard adjacent to the Werdhölzli tram terminus.

VBZ also offers various services such as the hire of heritage trams, engineering and repair services using its well-equipped and modern workshops and also transport consulting services.

In 1927, a group of VBZ employees founded their own football club called FC VBZ. As of 2020, the club is still active and competes in the corporate league.

== See also ==
- Public transport in Zurich
- Transport in Switzerland
- List of town tramway systems in Switzerland
- List of bus operating companies in Switzerland
- Zurich model
