= Tram 2000 =

Swiss tram vehicle series

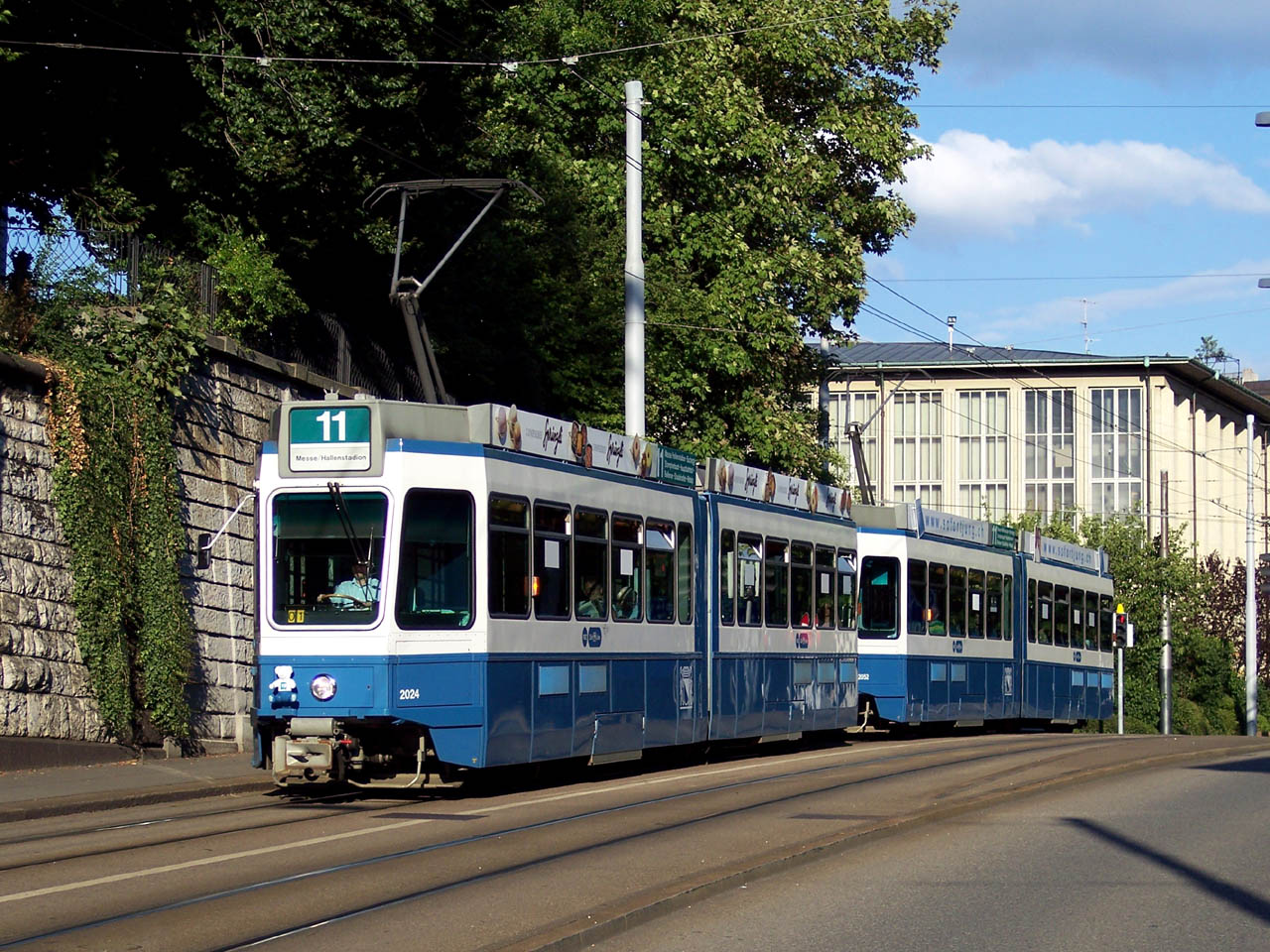
- A pair of Zürich Tram 2000 Be 4/6 vehicles in August 2005

Specifications
- Current collector(s): pantograph
- Track gauge: 1,000 mm (3 ft 3 3/8 in) metre gauge, 1,435 mm (4 ft 8 1/2 in) standard gauge

The Tram 2000 is a type of tram vehicle that was originally designed for the Verkehrsbetriebe Zürich (VBZ), the municipal transport operator of the Swiss city of Zürich, and first introduced in 1976. Other variants of the type were subsequently built for the VBZ, for other Swiss operators, and for the Italian city of Genoa. The last vehicles to the design entered service in 1994, but the type is still in front line service with all its original users.

The Tram 2000 is a high-floor tram design, which has been built as a single section tram with two bogies, or as a two or three section articulated vehicle with three or four bogies respectively. Variants exist to both metre gauge and standard gauge, and can be either single-ended or double-ended. All vehicles share a similar angular body shape.

== History ==
In 1976, Verkehrsbetriebe Zürich (VBZ) took delivery of their first batch of 60 Tram 2000 vehicles, for use on the Zürich tram system. These metre gauge articulated bogie trams have two body sections supported on three bogies. The centre bogie supports the articulation and only the outer bogies are powered, an arrangement that is designated Be 4/6 in Switzerland. As VBZ's network has turning loops at all termini, the cars are single-ended (have a driver's cab at only one end) and single-sided (have doors on only one side). The car bodies were built by SWS, the bogies by SIG and the electrical equipment by BBC. Of the cars, 45 are of standard configuration whereas 15 have no driving cabs and are so suitable only for use as a second unit in a coupled pair. The name Tram 2000 derives from the numbering series applied to these trams, but also reflects the fleet modernisation their introduction heralded.

The Forchbahn, a metre gauge suburban light railway in the suburbs of Zürich that shares tracks with the VBZ urban tram system, also took delivery of its first Tram 2000 vehicles in 1976. These units are slightly wider than their VBZ counterparts, and are non-articulated vehicles operated in permanently coupled pairs with a cab at each end of the pair. They have a Swiss type designation of Be 8/8 and 11 such units were delivered from 1976 to 1986. In parallel with these units, four unpowered driving trailers, of type Bt, were delivered in 1981 and 1982.

In 1981, the Neuchâtel tram system took delivery of four matching double-sided motor cars and control trailers, to a design derived from that of the Forchbahn cars. These built by SWS, whilst two further motor cars were added in 1988 with bodies built by Schindler Waggon and trucks by SIG.

In 1985, delivery of a second batch of VBZ trams commenced. As SWS was no longer trading, the mechanical part was supplied by Schindler Waggon. Of this batch, 53 were similar to the standard model delivered earlier, whilst a further 20 were non-articulated cars designated Be 2/4. Similarly to the 15 non-driving units of the earlier batch, these units have no driving cab and are only suitable for use in coupled pairs. This type was specially designed to permit optimal use to be made of the platform length of certain stops where platform extensions were not acceptable. Delivery of the second batch lasted until 1987.

In 1987 and 1988, a fleet of nine Be4/8 double-ended double-articulated cars were built by SWP / SIG / ABB for Regionalverkehr Bern-Solothurn (RBS) for use on the RBS suburban tramway to Worb.

For the opening of the Genoa Metro in 1990, a fleet of six Be 4/6 standard gauge double-ended single-articulated cars were built to the Tram 2000 design. Unlike their counterparts on Swiss tramways, these high-floor cars operate on segregated right of way and serve stations with matching high platforms.

The third and final batch of VBZ trams was delivered in 1991–1992. This comprised a further 23 standard articulated units and a further 15 non-articulated non-driving units. In contrast to the earlier batches, these trams have three-phase AC motors. Despite electrical differences between the batches, all VBZ Tram 2000 units can be combined in pairs for multiple unit operation.

A second batch of eight Forchbahn vehicles was delivered in 1994 and were to be the last trams to be built to the Tram 2000 design. Like their predecessors, these cars are non-articulated vehicles with a cab at one end but doors on both sides, intended to operate back to back. However they are not permanently coupled, and are therefore classified Be 4/4.

In the early 2000s, VBZ decided to rebuild some older trams with low floor sections and, as a prototype, a Tram 2000 centre section was built by VBZ's own workshops largely using stock parts. This section was inserted into 2113 in 2001 and underwent extensive tests. Following the successful conclusion of these, 22 identical sections were ordered from Winpro (formerly SLM) using bogies from Alstom. These were inserted into numbers 2099-2112/2114-2121 in 2004 and 2005. This rebuild stretches these trams from a Be 4/6 configuration to Be 4/8. Similarly, in 2010, the Bern cars were rebuilt from Be 4/8 to Be 4/10 with the addition of a new low floor section.

As of 2013, no large scale withdrawals of Tram 2000 vehicles have taken place, and the design is still in service with all its original users. However the VBZ has requested tenders for the supply of 30 new trams, together with an option for the supply of a further 70 vehicles, in order to commence replacement. The first new trams are to be delivered in December 2016, at which point significant withdrawals are to be expected.

Beginning in 2022, VBZ will take its Trams 2000 out of service. Most will be scrapped, but 35 are to be donated to the Ukrainian city of Vinnytsia, as VBZ previously did with its 1960s Karpfen and Mirage rolling stock.

== Variants ==
The following variants of the Tram 2000 design have been built:

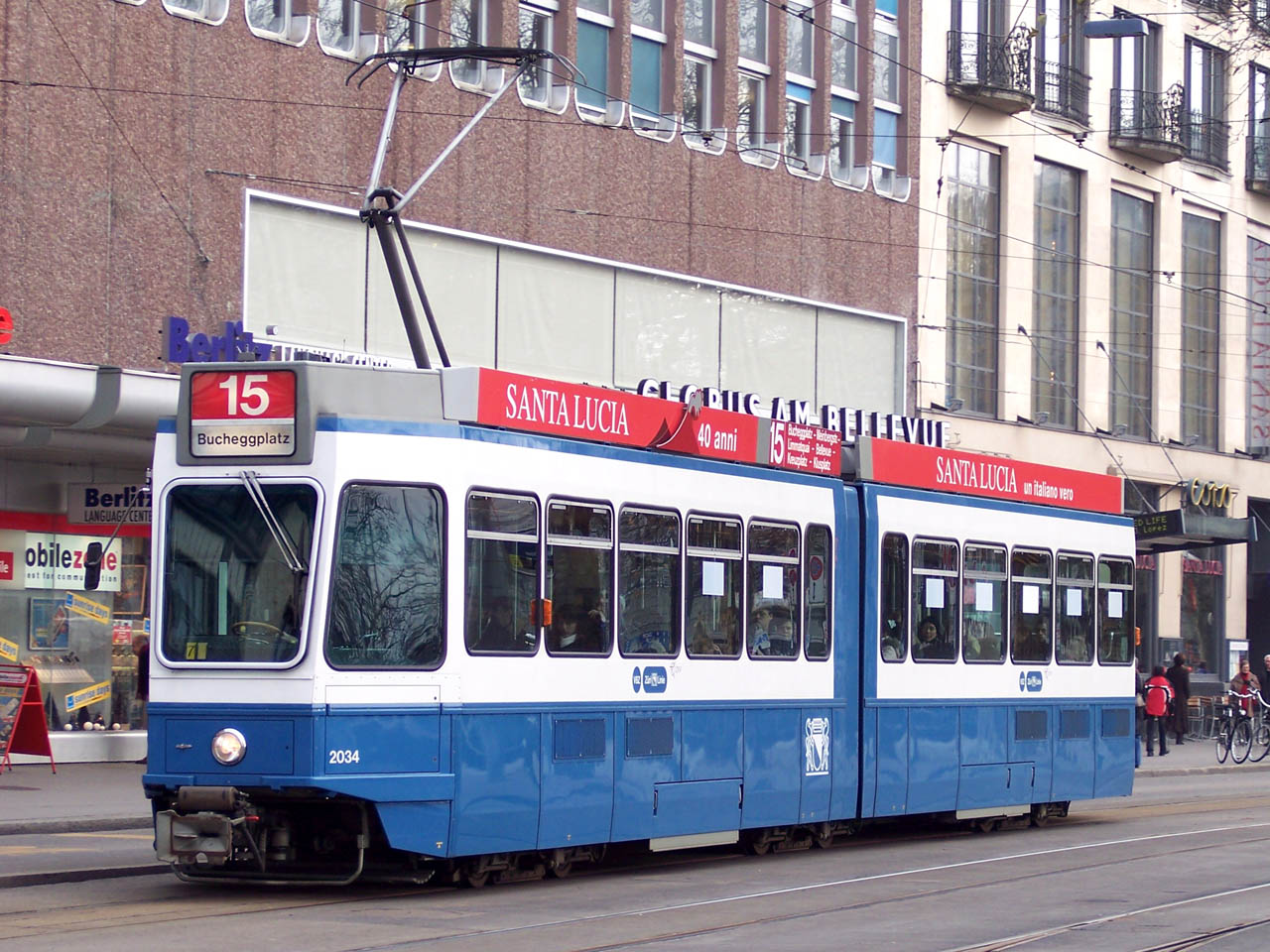
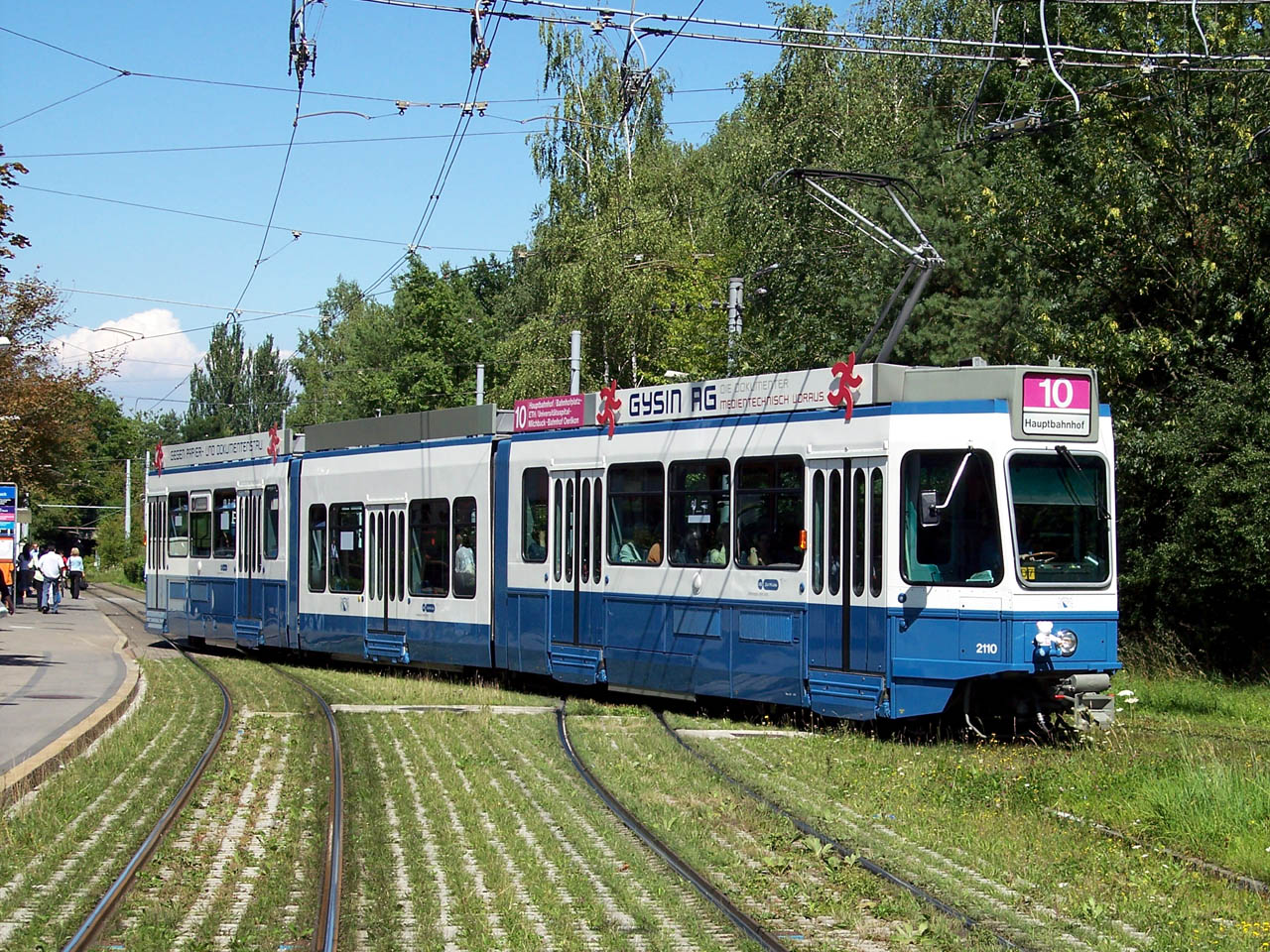
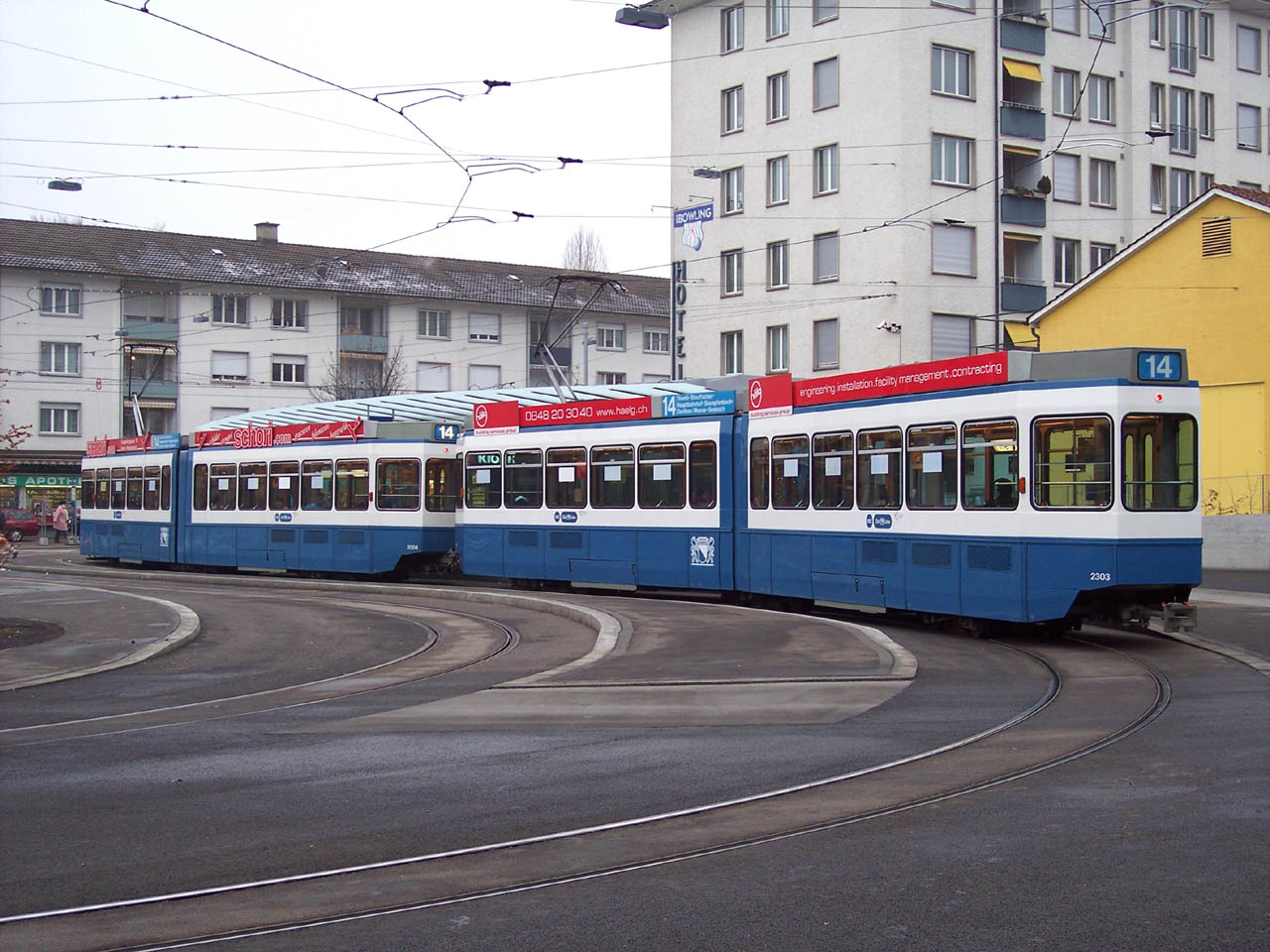
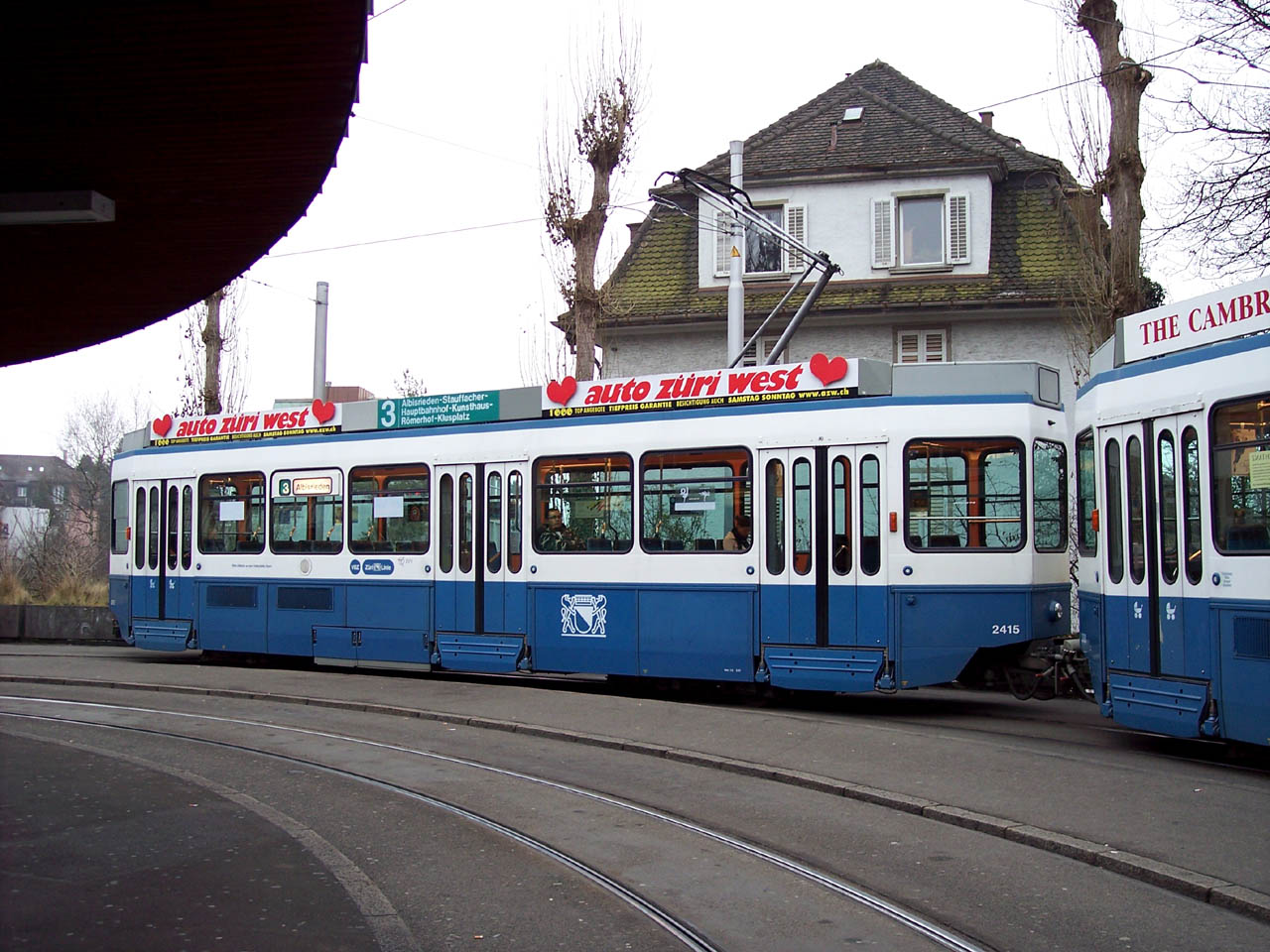
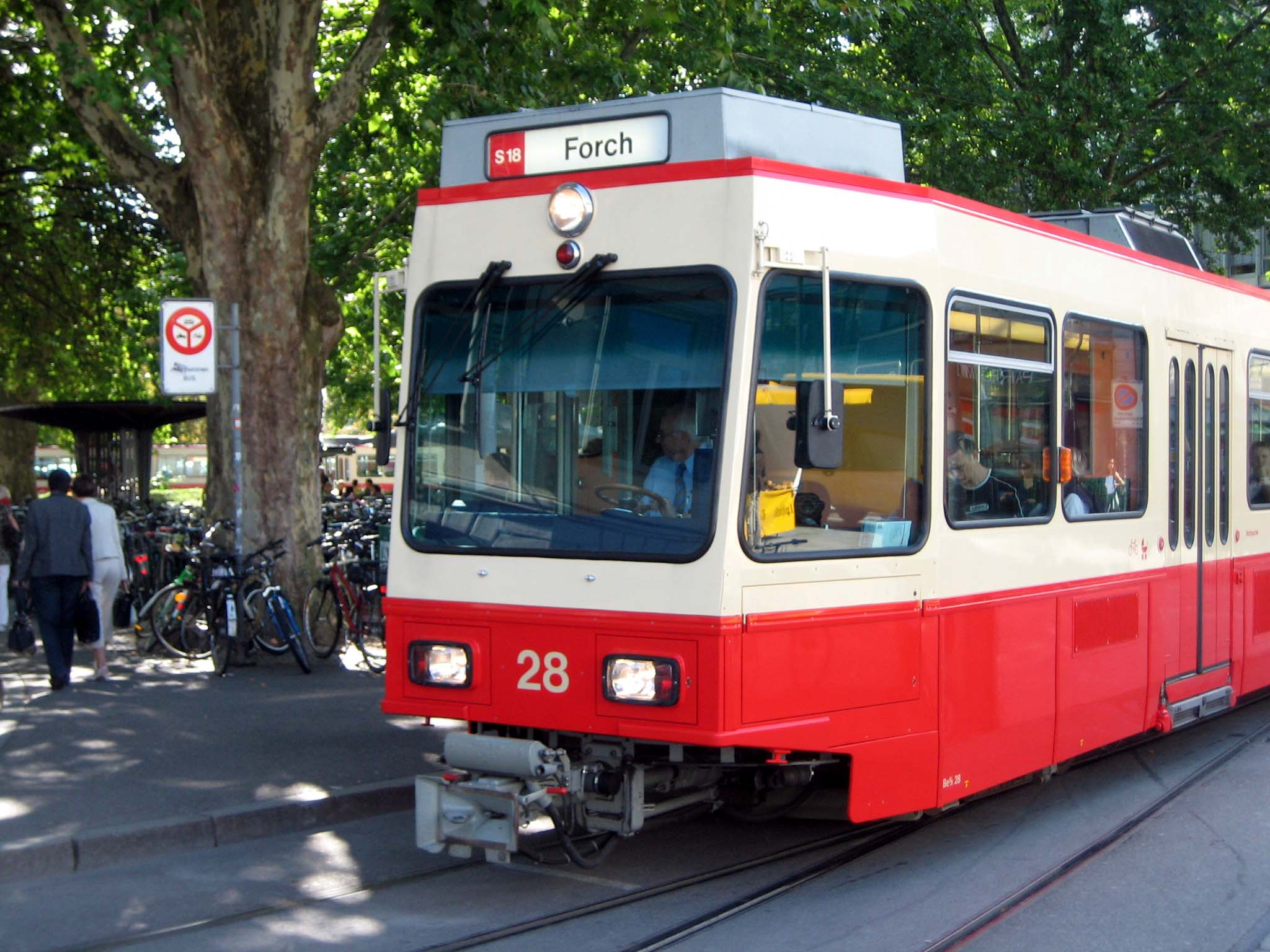
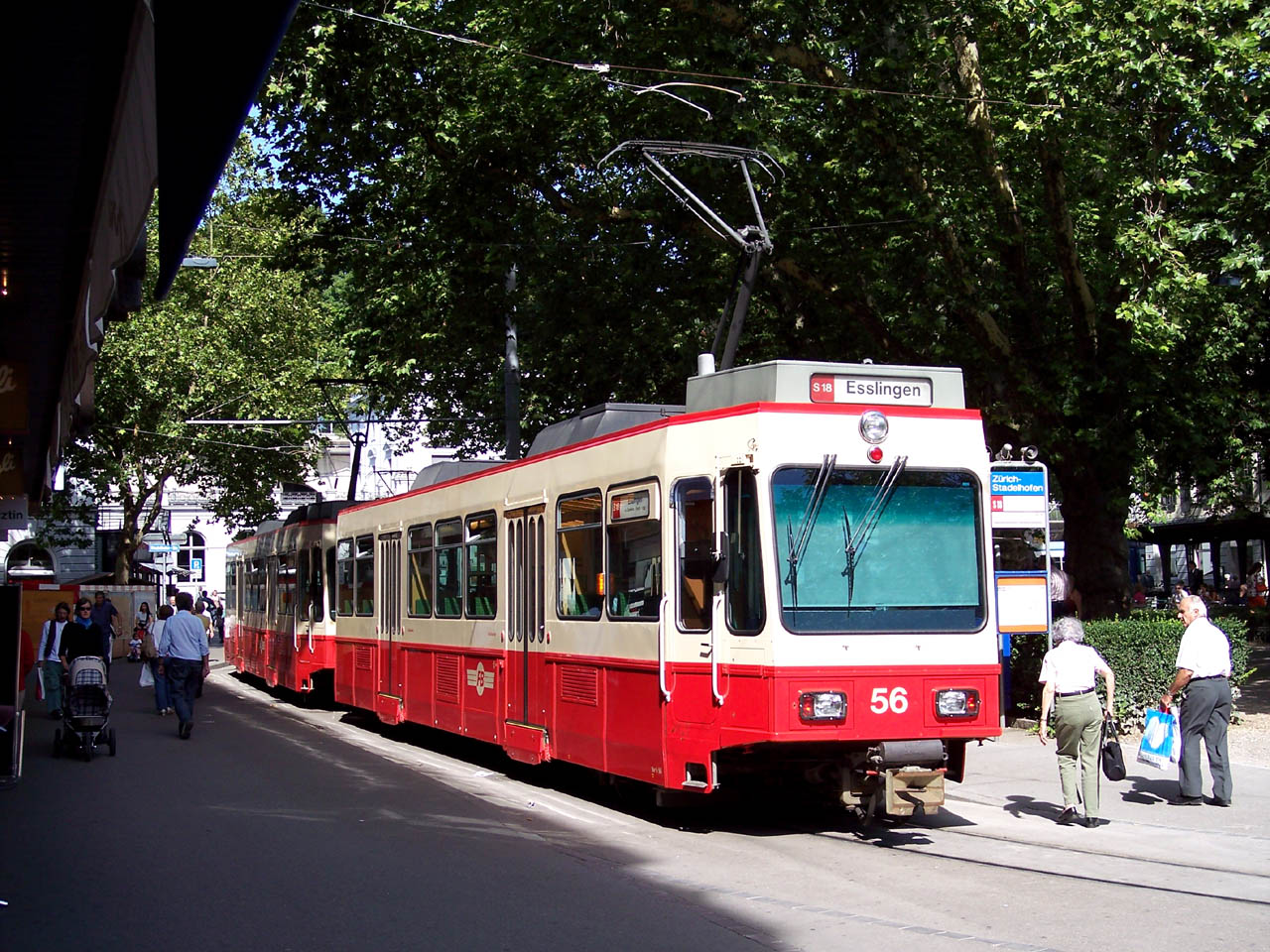
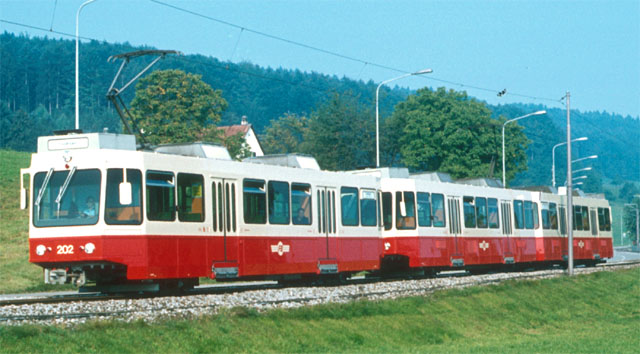
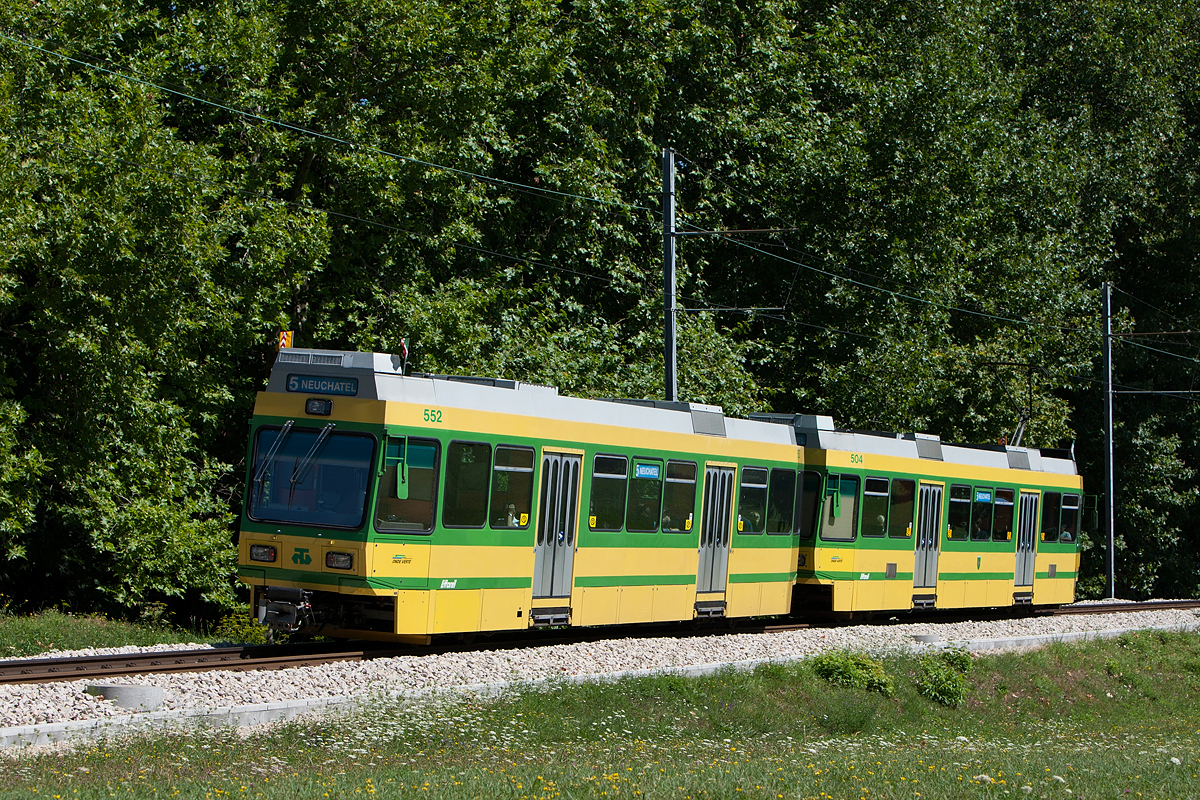
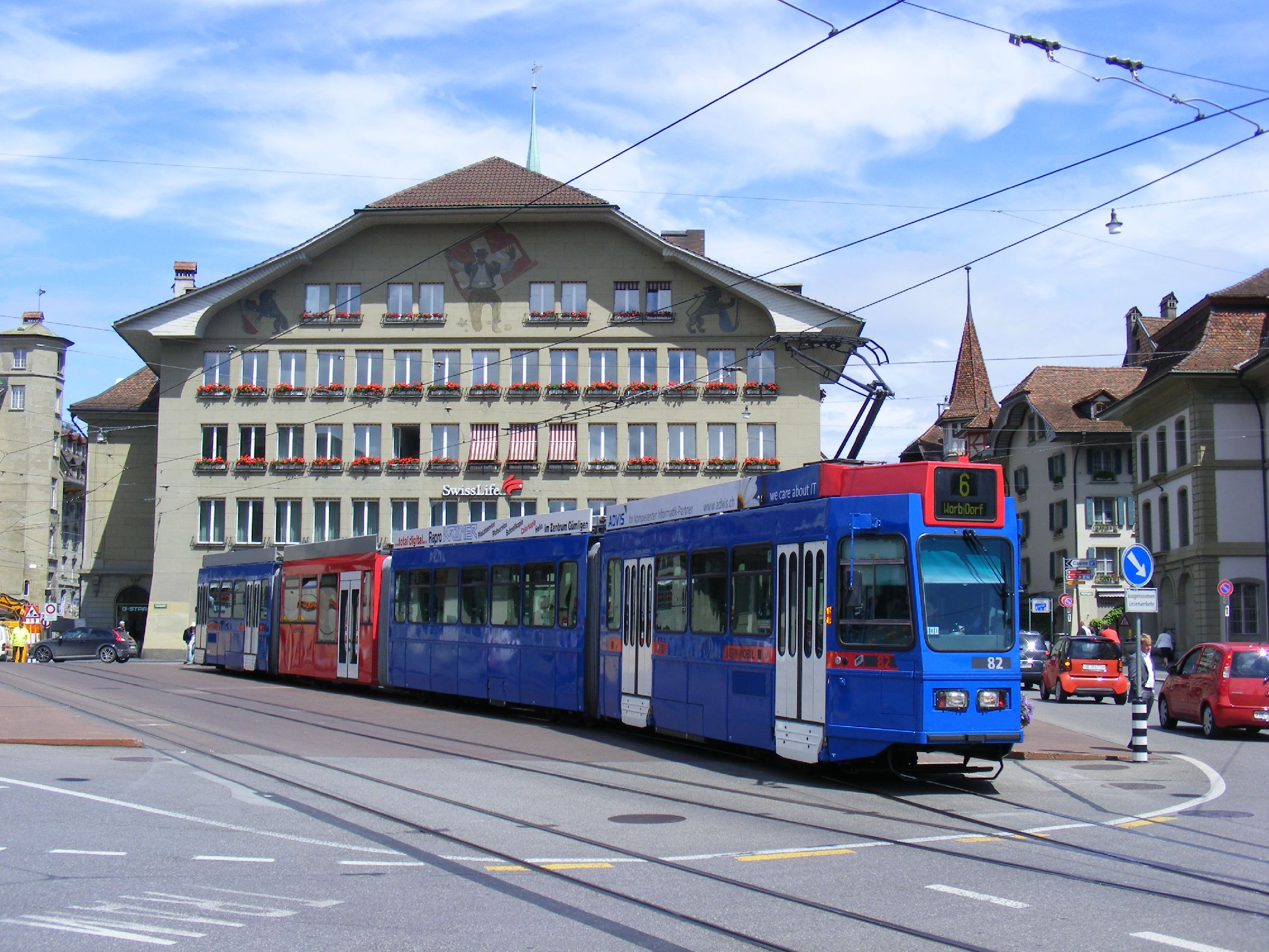
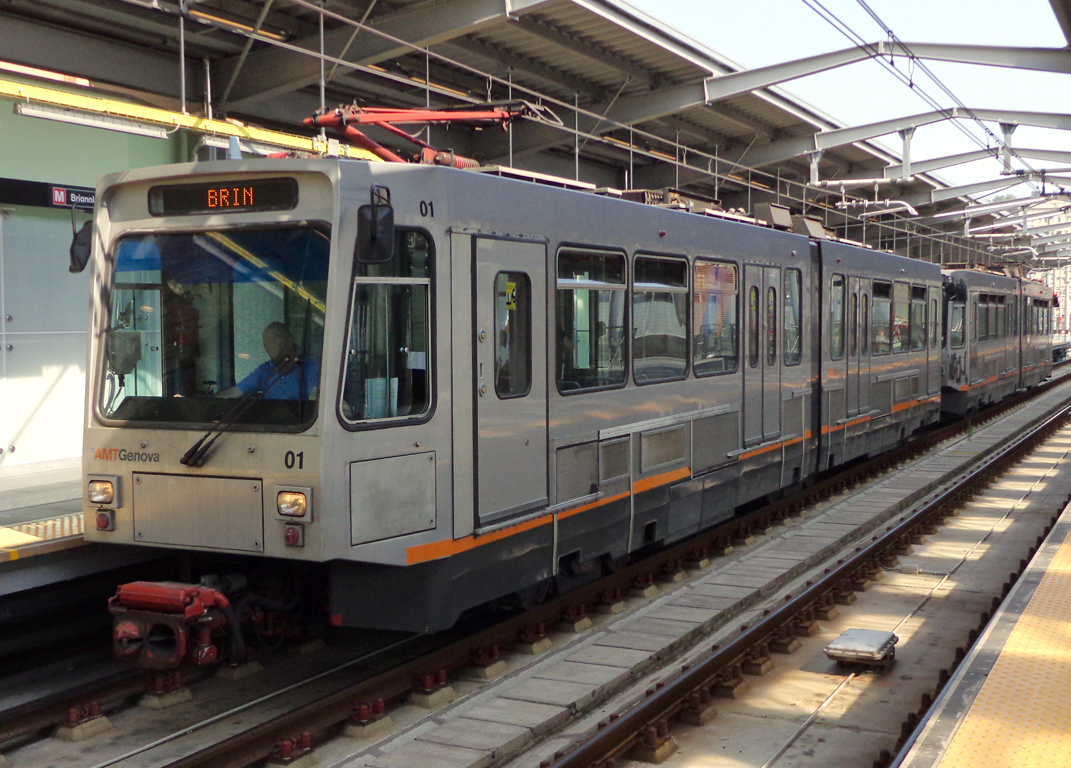
Image	System	Numbers	Notation	Year	Notes
	Zürich	2001–2098	Be 4/6	1976–1978, 1985–1987	The two section articulated variant for Zürich. Each vehicle is 21.4 metres (70 ft 2 1/2 in) in length and 2.2 metres (7 ft 2 5/8 in) in width, and seats 50 passengers with 54 standing. In most cases these cars operate in multiple.
	Zürich	2099–2121	Be 4/8	1992–1993	Originally two section units similar to 2001–2098, between 1999 and 2005 they were rebuilt with a third central low-floor section. Each vehicle is 28 metres (91 ft 10 3/8 in) in length and 2.2 metres (7 ft 2 5/8 in) in width, and seats 68 passengers with 75 standing. They are also known as Sänfte.
	Zürich	2301–2315	Be 4/6	1978	Two section articulated unit similar to 2001–2098 but without a drivers cab. These cars must run as the second unit in multiple with another Tram 2000 unit. Each vehicle is 21.4 metres (70 ft 2 1/2 in) in length and 2.2 metres (7 ft 2 5/8 in) in width, and seats 50 passengers with 57 standing.
	Zürich	2401–2435	Be 2/4	1985–1987, 1992–1993	Single section non-articulated unit without a drivers cab. These cars were built in two tranches from 1985 to 1987, and 1992 to 1993. Like 2301–2315, they must run as the second unit in multiple with another Tram 2000 unit. Each vehicle is 15.4 metres (50 ft 6 1/4 in) in length and 2.2 metres (7 ft 2 5/8 in) in width, and seats 35 passengers with 41 standing. They are also known as Pony.
	Forchbahn	21/22-31/32	Be 8/8	1976–1986	Units comprising pairs of motor cars permanently coupled back-to-back with a drivers cab at each end of the unit, and doors on both sides.
	Forchbahn	51–58	Be 4/4	1994	Motor cars, with a cab at one end and doors on both sides.
	Forchbahn	201–204	Bt	1981–1982	Unpowered driving trailer cars, for use with units 21/22-31/32, with a cab at one end and doors on both sides.
	Neuchâtel	501–506; 551–554	Be 4/4; Bt	1981; 1988	Matching double-sided motor cars (501–506) and control trailers (551–554), to a design derived from that of the Forchbahn cars. All were built by SWS in 1981, except the last two powered cars, 505–506, which were built in 1988 and had bodies built by Schindler Waggon (to the same style as cars 501–504) and trucks by SIG.
	Bern	81–89	Be 4/10	1987–1988	These are double-articulated units have cabs at both ends and doors on both sides. Owned by Regionalverkehr Bern-Solothurn (RBS), they were built by SWP / SIG / ABB as Be 4/8 for use on the RBS suburban tramway to Worb. In 2010 they were extended by Stadler with the addition of a new low floor section.
	Genoa Metro	01-06	AMT "Series 0"		High-floor standard gauge articulated units built by Stanga under license for the Genova Metro.

== Models ==
HO scale models of Tram 2000 are manufactured by Navemo.

== See also ==
- Trams in Zürich
