= Zurich Stadelhofen railway station =

Railway station in the centre of the Swiss city of Zürich

Zürich Stadelhofen
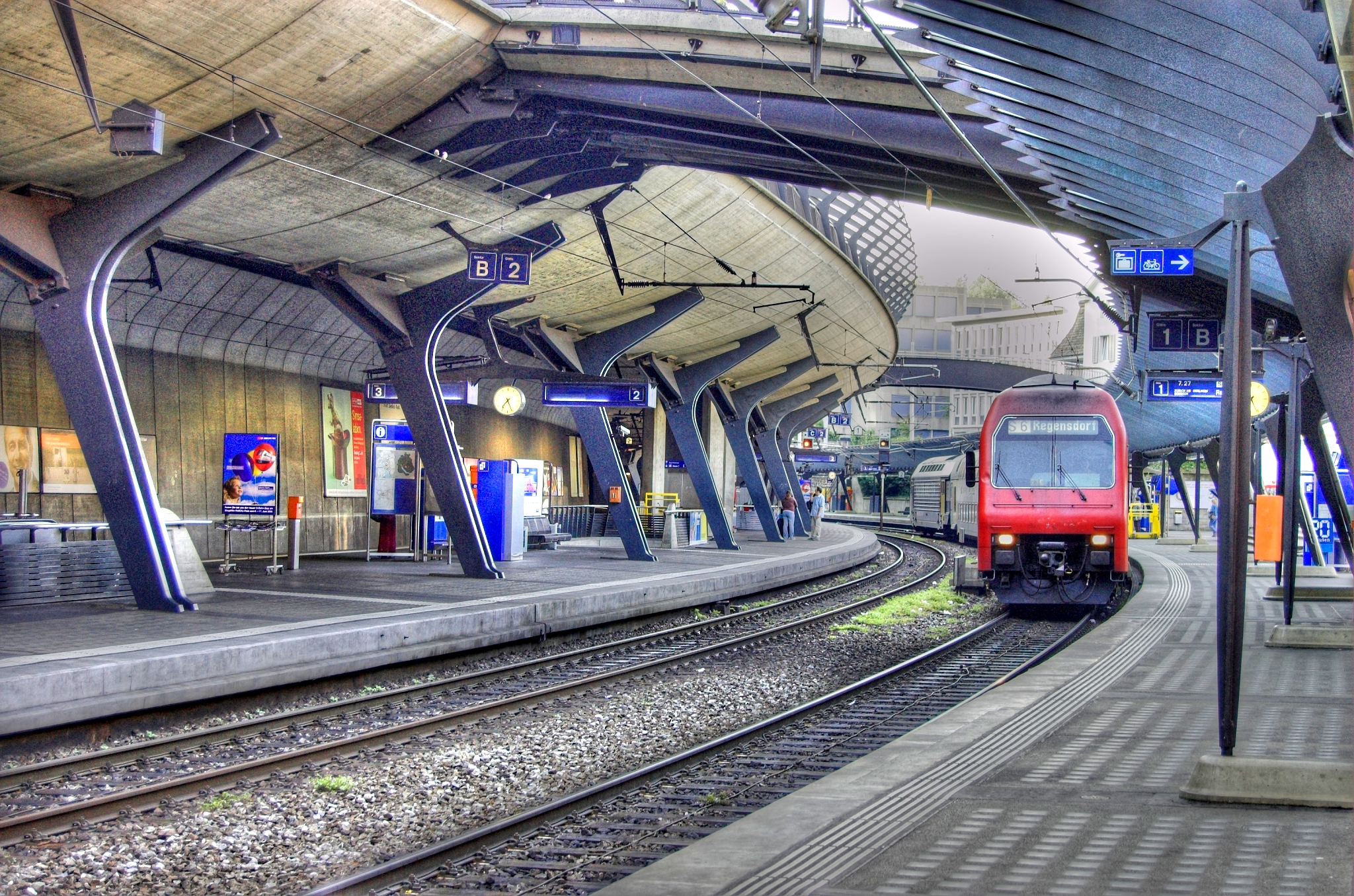
- The platforms in 2006

General information
- Location: Stadelhoferstrasse 6A; Zurich; Switzerland
- Coordinates: 47°22′00″N 8°32′55″E
- Elevation: 410 m (1,350 ft)
- Owner: Swiss Federal Railways
- Lines: Lake Zürich right bank railway line; Zürichberg railway line
- Platforms: 2
- Tracks: 3
- Train operators: Swiss Federal Railways
- Connections: ZVV: Bahnhof Stadelhofen, Opernhaus
- Train: S-Bahn
- Tram: VBZ trams 2 4 5, and Forchbahn FB S18 at stop Bahnhof Stadelhofen, and VBZ trams 11 15 at stop Opernhaus
- Bus: AZZK buses 912 916 at stop Opernhaus
- Airport: A direct train S16 every half an hour to/from Zurich Airport in 0:18h and many more connections with one change in 0:20h

Construction
- Architect: 1990: Santiago Calatrava

Other information
- Fare zone: 110 (ZVV)

History
- Opened: 1894
- Rebuilt: 1983–1990 (S-Bahn launch)

Passengers
- 2025: 75,200 per day (SBB)
- Rank: 10 out of 1,095

Services
Preceding station	Zurich S-Bahn	Following station
Zürich HB towards Bülach	S3	Stettbach towards Wetzikon
Zürich HB towards Zug	S5	Uster towards Pfäffikon SZ
Zürich HB towards Baden	S6	Zürich Tiefenbrunnen towards Uetikon
Zürich HB towards Winterthur	S7	Meilen towards Rapperswil
Zürich HB towards Schaffhausen	S9	Stettbach towards Uster
Zürich HB towards Aarau	S11	Stettbach towards Seuzach or Wila
Zürich HB towards Brugg AG	S12	Stettbach towards Schaffhausen or Wil
Zürich HB towards Niederweningen	S15	Uster towards Rapperswil
Zürich HB towards Zurich Airport	S16	Zürich Tiefenbrunnen towards Herrliberg-Feldmeilen
Terminus	S18 transfer at Zürich Stadelhofen FB	Zürich Kreuzplatz towards Esslingen
Zürich HB towards Zürich Hardbrücke	S20	Küsnacht ZH towards Uerikon
Zürich HB Terminus	S23	Winterthur towards Romanshorn
Zürich HB towards Aarau	SN1 Limited service	Stettbach towards Winterthur
Zürich HB towards Knonau	SN5 Limited service	Uster towards Pfäffikon SZ
Zürich HB towards Würenlos	SN6 Limited service	Stettbach towards Winterthur
Zürich HB towards Bassersdorf	SN7 Limited service	Zürich Tiefenbrunnen towards Stäfa
Zürich HB towards Bülach	SN9 Limited service	Stettbach towards Uster
Zürich HB towards Olten	SN11 Limited service	Stettbach One-way operation
Terminus	SN18 Limited service transfer at Zürich Stadelhofen FB	Zürich Kreuzplatz towards Egg
Location

Zürich Stadelhofen railway station (German: Bahnhof Zürich Stadelhofen) is an important local railway station in the city of Zurich (fare zone 110 of the Zürcher Verkehrsverbund, ZVV). It is located on the Zurich-Rapperswil, Zürich-Winterthur, Zürich-Uster lines of the SBB CFF FFS (Swiss Federal Railways). An adjacent station, Zürich Stadelhofen FB, is the terminus of the Forchbahn (FB) suburban railway and is served by several lines of the Zürich tram network.

Stadelhofen lies close to the Zurich Opera House and near Bellevue Square. It is located in the city centre next to Lake Zürich and constitutes an early work by architect Santiago Calatrava in the city where he had studied.

== History ==
Changes to the railway routes in 1990

Stadelhofen station opened in 1894, at the same time as the Lake Zürich right bank railway (Rechtsufrige Zürichseebahn) from Zürich Hauptbahnhof to Rapperswil station. Until 1990, the station was an intermediate stop on this single track line, which departed from the Hauptbahnhof in a westerly direction, before performing a clockwise 270 degrees turn via a viaduct over the River Limmat and passing through Letten station and the Letten tunnel to Stadelhofen. By rail the distance between the Hauptbahnhof and Stadelhofen was some 5 kilometres (3.1 mi), despite the fact that they are only 1.5 kilometres (0.93 mi) apart in a straight line.

In 1990 there were major changes to the railway geography of this part of Zürich. To the north of Stadelhofen, the Letten tunnel was closed and replaced by the twin-track Hirschengraben tunnel, which took a direct route under the River Limmat to Hauptbahnhof, serving new through low level platforms there. At the same time a junction was formed to the south of Stadelhofen, allowing trains leaving Zurich to take either the original right bank line to Tiefenbrunnen station and onwards to Rapperswil, or to travel via the newly built Zürichberg Tunnel to Stettbach station and points to the east and north of Zurich.

Stadelhofen therefore became part of the through west–east backbone of the Zürich S-Bahn, and was rebuilt into its current form with an additional platform and enhanced station infrastructure.

== Layout and facilities ==
The station is situated to the south-east of Zürich city centre, adjacent to the Stadelhofen city square. The station is on a gentle curve, aligned roughly north to south, with the main station building and square to the west, and a rising hillside to the east. The station has three tracks, alongside a side platform to the west and an island platform to the east. The rail approaches at both ends are in tunnel, with the Hirschengraben Tunnel to Zürich Hauptbahnhof to the north. To the south the line divides inside the tunnel, with one route traversing the Zürichberg Tunnel to Stettbach station and the other a single track tunnel to Tiefenbrunnen station.

The station can be accessed from either side. An underground retail arcade runs the length of the station below the tracks and provides access between the platforms and station entrances. Underground access is supplemented by two bridges which span the station, one carrying a footpath and the other restricted road traffic.

== Operation ==
Stadelhofen station is a nodal point of the Zürich transport network. The main station is served by lines S3, S5, S6, S7, S9, S11, S12, S15 and S16 of the Zürich S-Bahn, running on the SBB lines. The S20 and S23 provide additional peak-hour service. S-Bahn line S18, running over the Forchbahn, leaves from outside the station, at a stop on Stadelhofenplatz.

All trains from the main Stadelhofen station operate via the Hirschengraben Tunnel and low-level platforms 41–44 at Hauptbahnhof, continuing to Hardbrücke station. They provide, for most of the day, 18 trains per hour (tph) to or from these central Zürich stations. Other stations served include:

- Aarau (S11, 2 tph)
- Affoltern am Albis (S5, 2 tph)
- Baden (S6/S12; 4 tph)
- Brugg AG (S12; 2 tph)
- Bülach (S9; 2 tph)
- Dietikon (S11/S12; 4 tph)
- Effretikon (S3/S7; 4 tph)
- Herrliberg-Feldmeilen (S6/S16; 4 tph)
- Niederweningen (S15; 2 tph)
- Rafz (S9; 2 tph)
- Rapperswil (S5/S7/S15; 6 tph)
- Schaffhausen (S9/S12; 2 tph)
- Uetikon (S6/S7; 4 tph)
- Uster (S5/S9/S15, 6 tph)
- Wetzikon (S3/S5/S15; 6 tph)
- Winterthur (S7/S11/S12, 6 tph)
- Zug (S5; 2 tph)
- Zürich Airport (S16; 2 tph)
- Zürich Altstetten (S5/S11/S12, 6 tph)
- Zürich Oerlikon (S6/S7/S9/S15/S16; 10 tph)

The Forchbahn (line S18) runs from the Stadelhofenplatz stop via Forch to Esslingen. The Stadelhofenplatz stop is also served by tram routes 2, 4 and 5 of the Verkehrsbetriebe Zürich, whilst the same operators tram routes 11 and 15 serve the nearby Opernhaus stop. Trams and buses connect Stadelhofen to areas both inside and outside of the city of Zürich.

Summary of all regional train services by Zürich S-Bahn:

- S3 (Bülach–) Hardbrücke–Zürich HB–Effretikon–Wetzikon
  Extended from Hardbrücke to Bülach during rush hour, operating non-stop from Glattbrugg.
- S5 Zug–Affoltern am Albis–Zürich HB–Uster–Wetzikon–Rapperswil–Pfäffikon SZ
  Stops between Stadelhofen and Wetzikon only in Uster.
- S6 Baden AG–Regensdorf-Watt–Hardbrücke–Zürich HB–Uetikon
- S7 Winterthur–Kloten–Hardbrücke–Zürich HB–Meilen–Rapperswil
  Operates non stop between Stadelhofen and Meilen, Winterthur and Effretikon, stops in Kemptthal as of 9:20 PM.
- S9 (Schaffhausen–) Rafz–Hardbrücke–Zürich HB–Uster
  Operates every 30 minutes between Schaffhausen and Rafz only during rush hour, otherwise every hours.
- S11 Aarau–Lenzburg–Dietikon–Zürich HB–Zürich Stettbach–Winterthur–Seuzach/Sennhof-Kyburg (–Wila)
  Operates non stop between Stettbach and Winterthur; the lines to Seuzach and Sennhof-Kyburg are operated alternately at hourly intervals; supplementary trains to Wila.
- S12 Brugg AG–Zürich HB–Zürich Stettbach– Winterthur–Schaffhausen/Wil SG
  Operates non stop between Stettbach and Winterthur; the lines to Schaffhausen and Wil SG are operated alternately at hourly intervals.
- S15 Niederweningen–Hardbrücke–Zürich HB–Uster–Wetzikon–Rapperswil
  Stops between Stadelhofen and Wetzikon only in Uster.
- S16 Zürich Flughafen –Hardbrücke–Zürich HB–Herrliberg-Feldmeilen (–Meilen)
  Extended in the evening to Meilen.
- S18 Zürich Stadelhofen–Zürich Rehalp–Forch–Esslingen
- S20 Uerikon–Zürich HB–Hardbrücke
  Operates only during rush hour; stops between Männedorf and Stadelhofen only in Meilen and Küsnacht ZH.
- S23 Zürich HB–Zürich Stadelhofen–Winterthur–Frauenfeld–Romanshorn
  Operates only during rush hour; morning services to Zürich and evening services to Romanshorn; stops between Stadelhofen and Amriswil only in Winterthur, Frauenfeld, Weinfelden and Sulgen.

During weekends, there are seven nighttime S-Bahn services (SN1, SN5, SN6, SN7, SN9, SN11, SN18) offered by ZVV:

- SN1: hourly service between Aarau and Winterthur via Zürich HB.
- SN5: hourly service between Knonau and Pfäffikon SZ via Zürich HB.
- SN6: hourly service between Würenlos and Winterthur via Zürich HB.
- SN7: hourly service between Bassersdorf and Stäfa via Zürich HB.
- SN9: hourly service between Bülach and Uster via Zürich HB.
- SN11: hourly service to Olten via Zürich HB.
- SN18: hourly service to Egg.

== Architecture ==
The existing Stadelhofen station building dates from 1894, and was built in a neoclassical style reflecting the surrounding buildings. In the 1990s the train station was rebuilt by the Spanish architect Santiago Calatrava. The principal challenge of this rebuild was to add a third track to a station constrained by a steep hillside rising above the station to one side, and an urban square to the other.

The resulting design preserved the existing station building on the square side, and excavated the hillside to provide room for the third track and the platform serving it. The hillside was then restored with a multilevel structure that reinstates the walkways and bank above, while providing an open, naturally lit island platform underneath serving the new track and its pre-existing neighbour. The massive canopy over this platform is complemented by a much lighter metal and glass canopy over the platform on the square side of the station. An underground arcade was created beneath the length of the station, providing retail space as well as access between the platforms and station entrances. The arcade is framed by sculptural arches, and is naturally lit through glass blocks embedded on the platforms. As well as the underground arcade, two bridges span the station, linking the city on each side.

Both station building and platforms are inscribed on the Swiss Inventory of Cultural Property of National Significance.

== Gallery ==
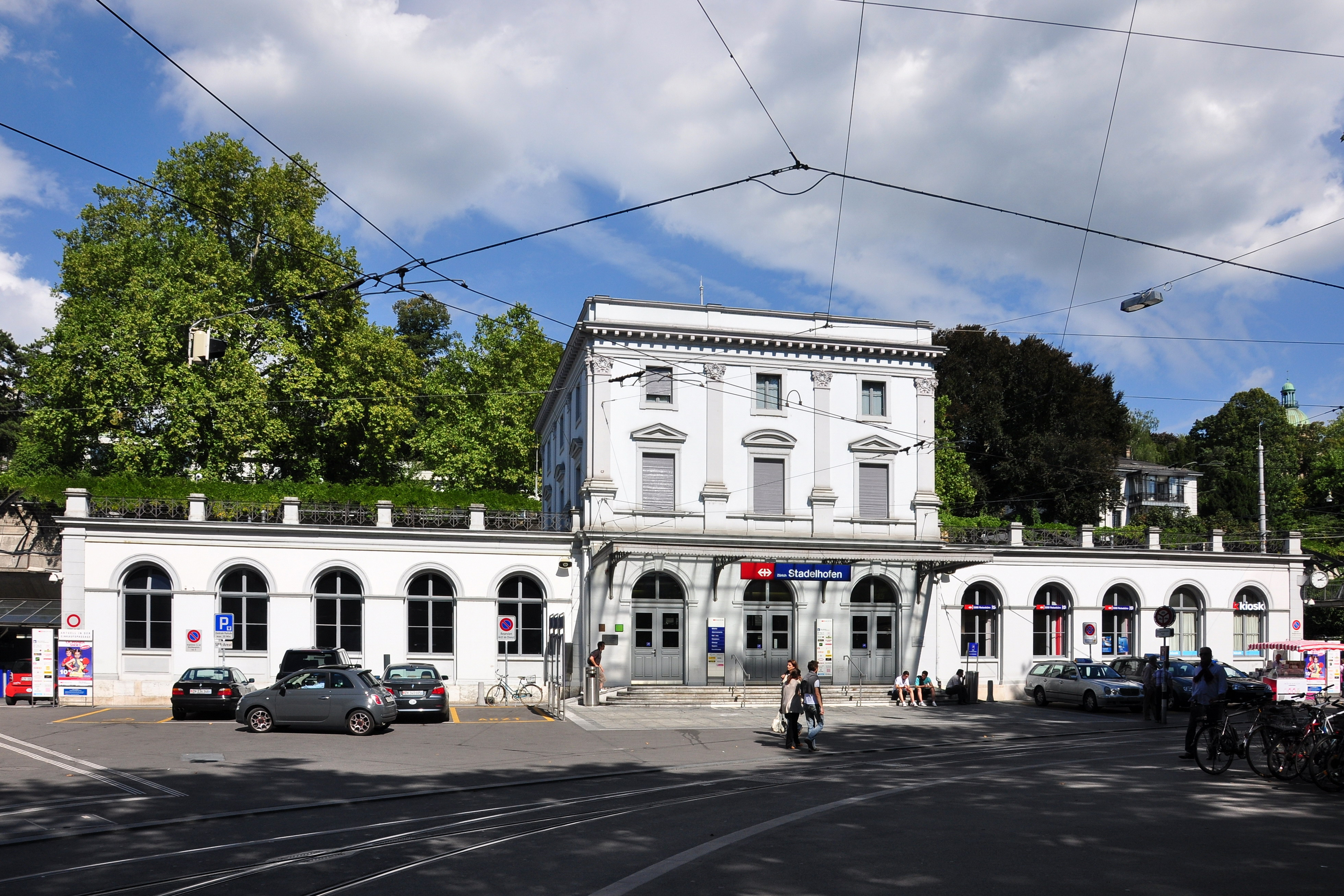
The frontage of the station seen from Stadelhofen square

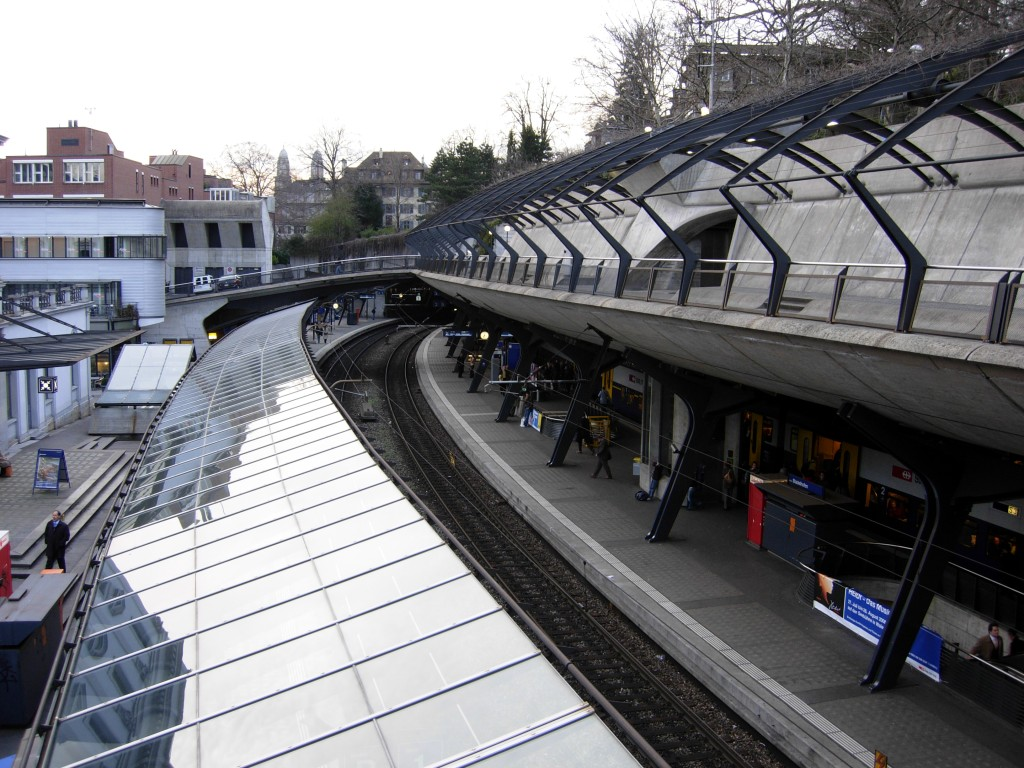
The view of the station from the southern overbridge

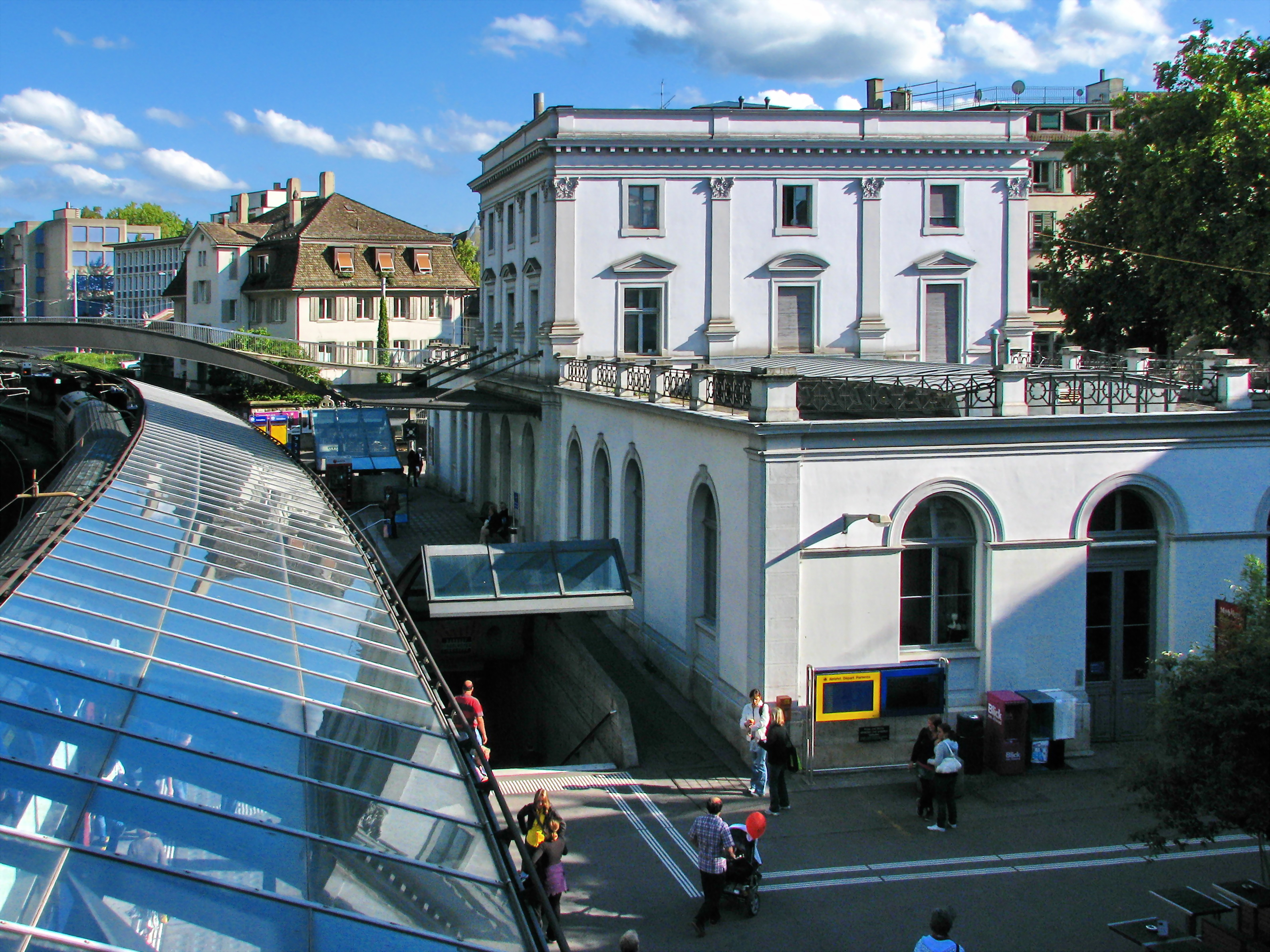
The station building as seen from the northern overbridge

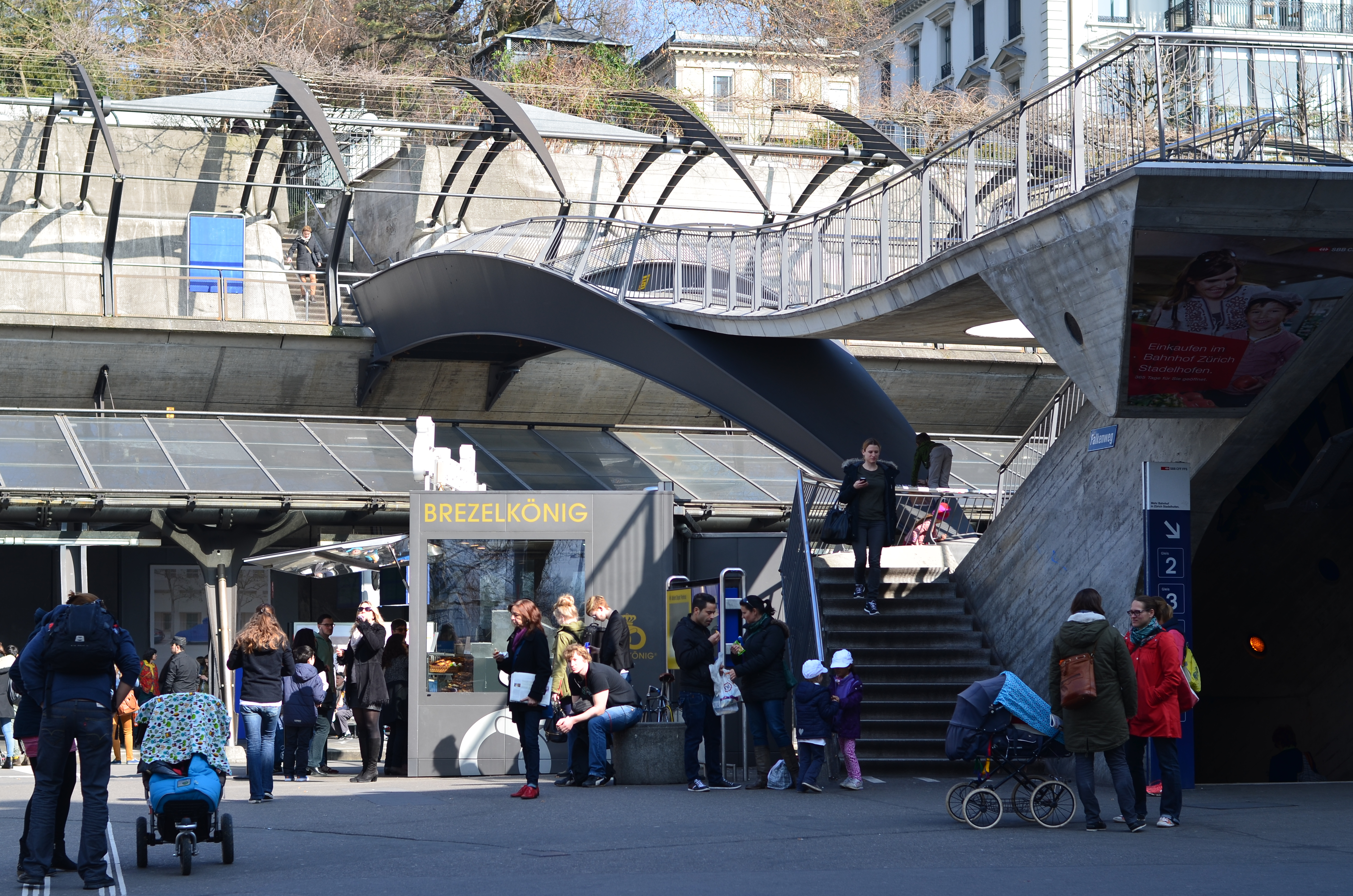
The southern pedestrian overbridge

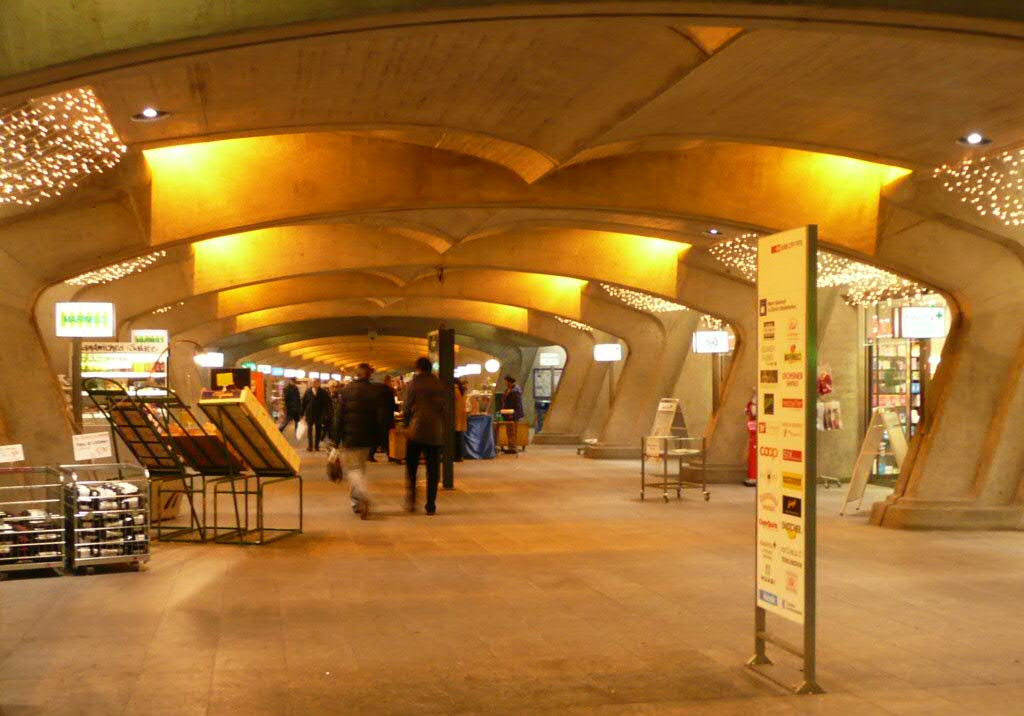
The arcade below the tracks

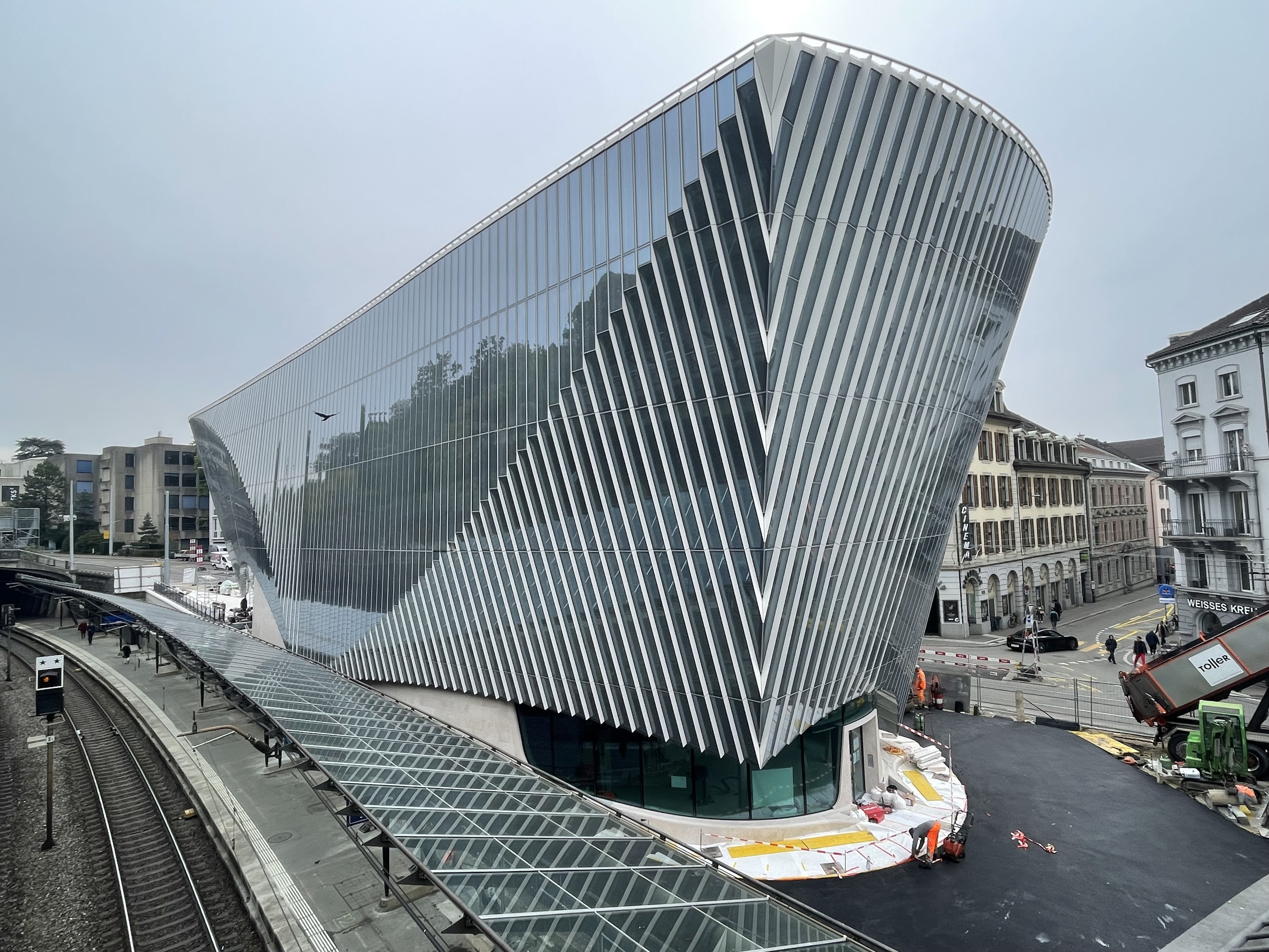
Haus zum Falken in 2025 (contains bicycle parking station)

== See also ==
- History of rail transport in Switzerland
- List of railway stations in Zurich
- Rail transport in Switzerland
