= Zürich Rehalp railway station =

Railway station on the edge of the Swiss city of Zurich

Zürich Rehalp
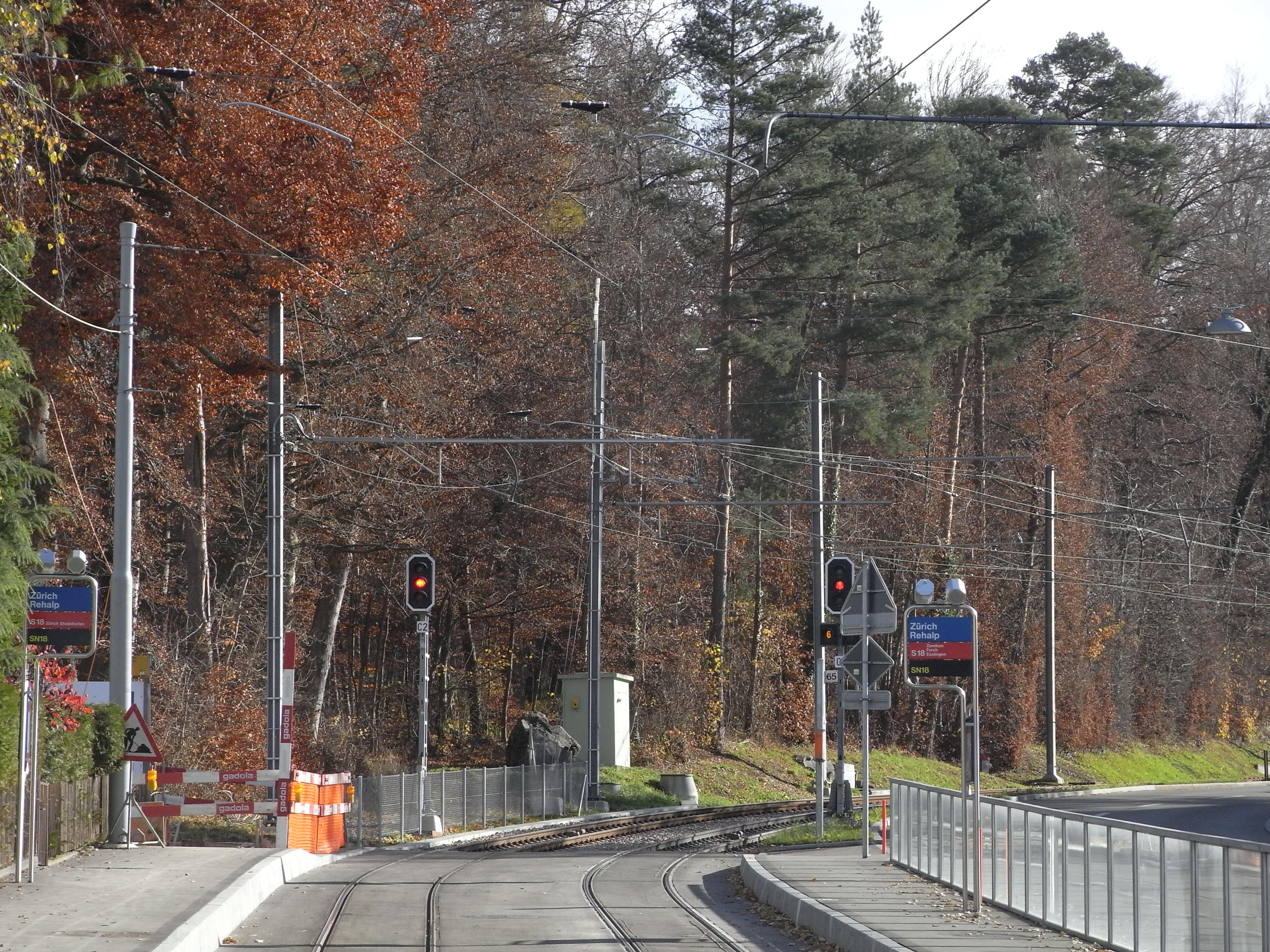
- The Forchbahn platforms looking in the out-of-city direction

General information
- Location: Zürich; Switzerland
- Coordinates: 47°21′04″N 8°34′59″E
- Elevation: 522 m (1,713 ft)
- Owner: Forchbahn AG; Verkehrsbetriebe Zürich
- Line: Forchbahn
- Train operators: Forchbahn AG

Other information
- Fare zone: ZVV 110

Services
Preceding station	Zurich S-Bahn	Following station
Zürich Balgrist towards Zürich Stadelhofen FB	S18	Waldburg towards Esslingen
Zürich Balgrist towards Zürich Stadelhofen FB	SN18 Limited service	Waldburg towards Egg
Preceding station	Zürich tramway network	Following station
Friedhof Enzenbühl towards Zürich Hauptbahnhof	4	Terminus
Location

Zürich Rehalp railway station (German: Bahnhof Zürich Rehalp) is a railway station and tram stop in the Swiss canton of Zürich, on the boundary between the city of Zürich and the municipality of Zollikon. The station is located on the line of the Forchbahn (FB), which is operated as Zürich S-Bahn service S18. The station is operated by Verkehrsbetriebe Zürich and Forchbahn AG and is the first true railway station on the S18 outbound from its city terminus at Zürich Stadelhofen FB. Between Stadelhofen and a point immediately to the city side of Rehalp station, the S18 operates over the tracks of the Zürich tram network, stopping at selected tram stops. Beyond Rehalp, the service operates on its own dedicated right of way.

On the opposite side of the Forchstrasse main road lies the turnaround loop and platforms for route 4 of the Zürich tram system, which operates over the same tracks as the S18 between Stadelhofen and Rehalp, but serving all intermediate tram stops.

== Services ==
As of the December 2024 timetable change, the following rail services stop at Zürich Rehalp:

- Zurich S-Bahn:
  - S18: service every fifteen minutes between Zürich Stadelhofen FB and Forch; every other train continues from Forch to Esslingen.
  - Nighttime S-Bahn (only during weekends):
    - SN18: hourly service between Zürich Stadelhofen FB and Egg.

== Gallery ==
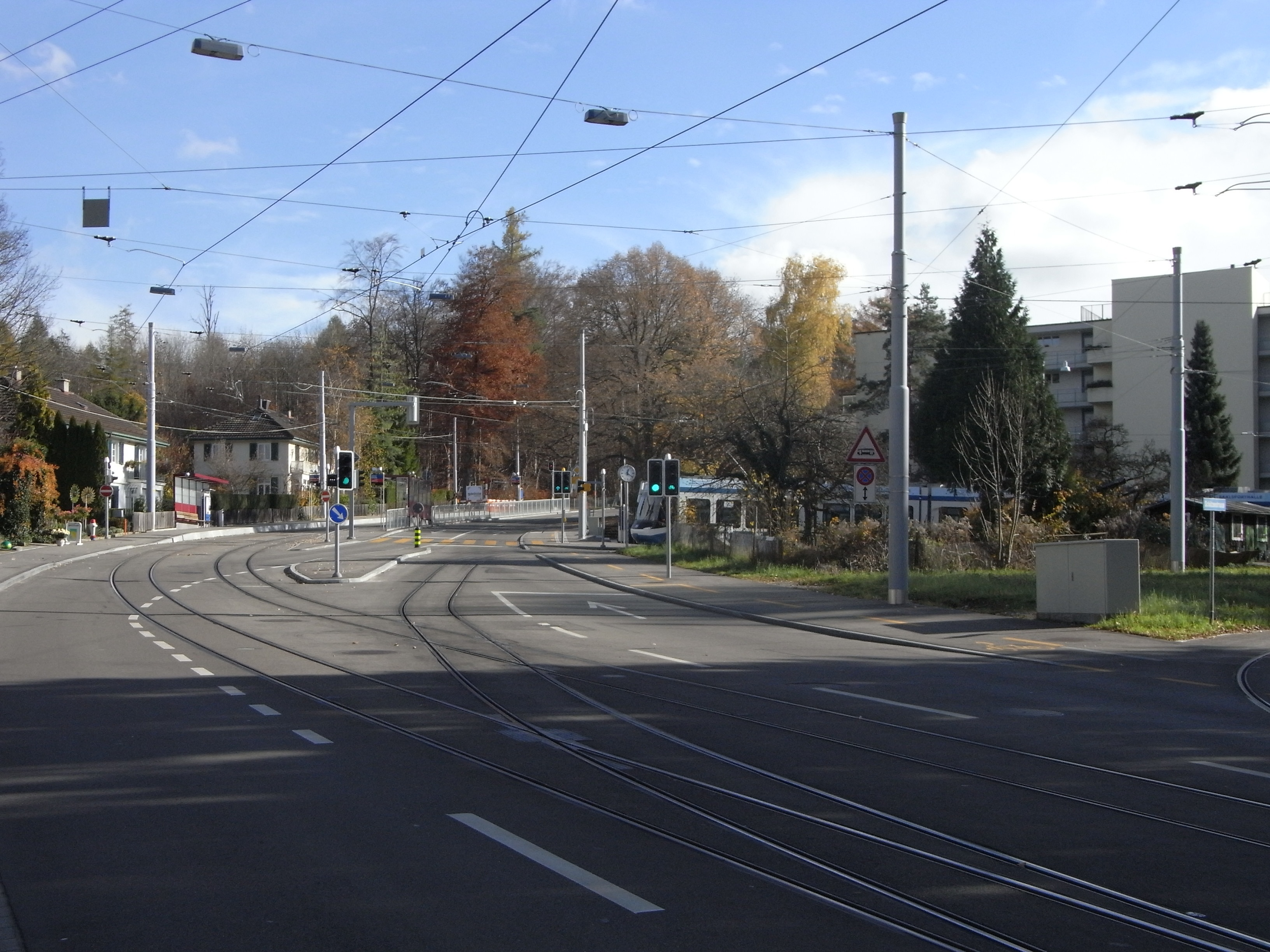
The junction between the FB and city trams; the left-hand tracks continue to the station, the tram terminus is to the right

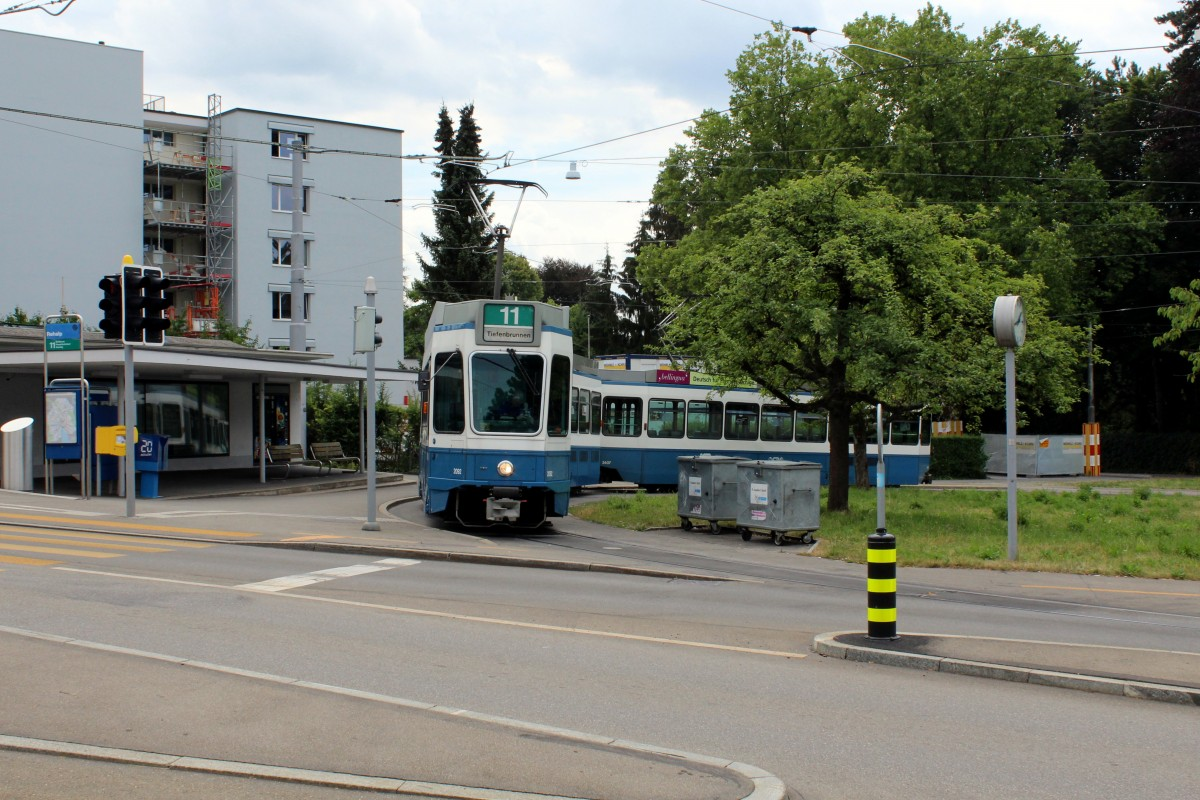
The tram terminus seen from the city end of the station platform

== See also ==
- Fare zones of Zurich
- List of railway stations in Zurich
- Public transport in Zurich
