= Forch railway =

Railway service in Switzerland

Forch railway (S18)
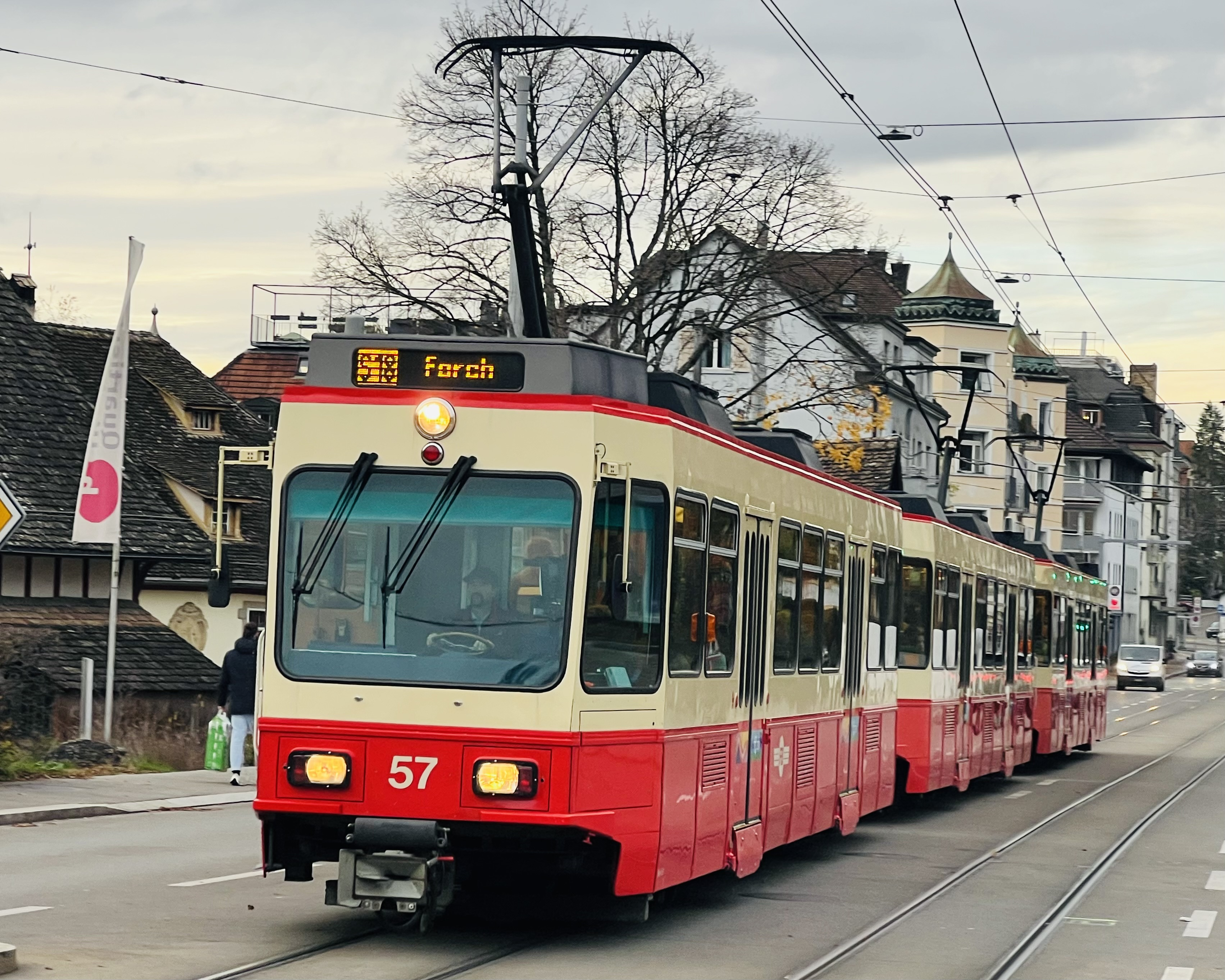

Overview
- Status: Operational
- Owner: Forchbahn AG
- Locale: Canton of Zürich, Switzerland
- Termini: Zürich Stadelhofen FB; Esslingen
- Stations: 20

Service
- Type: Light rail
- System: Zürich S-Bahn
- Services: 1
- Operator(s): Forchbahn AG
- Depot(s): Forch

History
- Opened: 1912

Technical
- Line length: 13 km (8.1 mi) (railway); 3 km (1.9 mi) (tramway)
- Number of tracks: Single and double track
- Track gauge: 1,000 mm (3 ft 3 3/8 in) metre gauge
- Electrification: Overhead line, 600 V DC; Overhead line, 1,200 V DC

The Forch railway (German: Forchbahn, FB, nicknamed Förchler, Frieda, Frieda Bünzli by locals) is a local mixed tramway / railway line in the Swiss canton of Zürich. It is owned and operated by the Forchbahn AG, and is branded as line S18 of the Zürich S-Bahn. The standard Zürcher Verkehrsverbund (ZVV) zonal fare tariffs apply to the line.

The line opened in 1912 and links the towns of Esslingen and Forch to Rehalp, an outer suburb of the city of Zürich. From Rehalp, trains continue over the Zürich tram system to a terminus at Zürich Stadelhofen FB, outside the Zürich Stadelhofen railway station in central Zürich.

The line is built to metre gauge (3 ft 3 3/8 in gauge). Between Esslingen and Rehalp the line has a length of some 13 km (8.1 mi), with the continuation over the Zürich tram system adding an extra 3 km (1.9 mi) of route.

== History ==
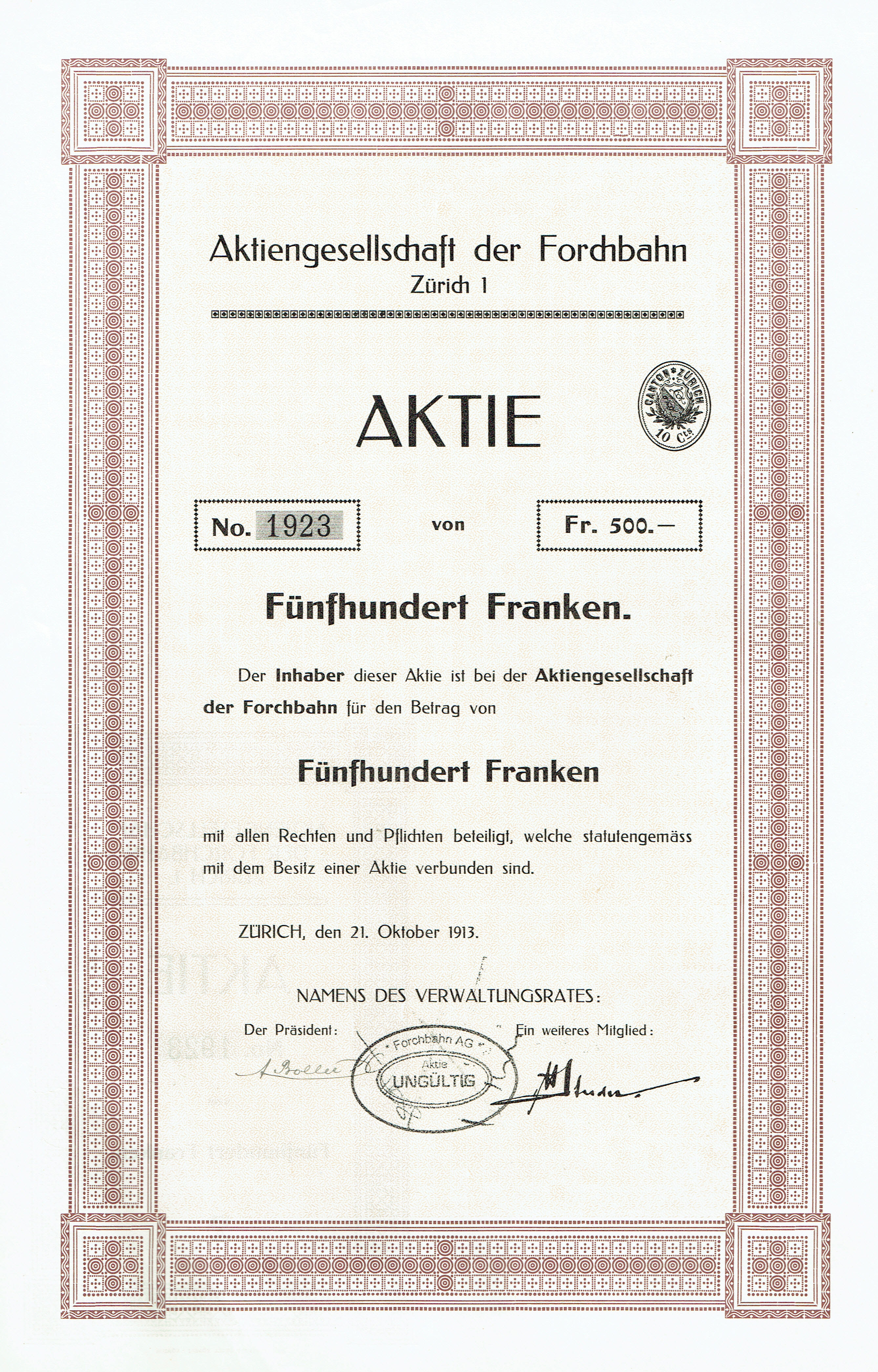
Share of the Forch railway, issued 21 October 1913

The Forch railway line opened on November 27, 1912, with the trip taking 67 minutes. As built, the line from the Zürich city boundary to Esslingen was a single track tramway, largely mixed in with road traffic. At Esslingen, the Forch line connected with the Uster-Oetwil line and, indirectly via that, with the Wetzikon-Meilen line. These two metre gauge tramway lines had both closed by 1950.

In 1950 it was proposed that the line should be replaced by buses, and a two-week test bus operation was undertaken with moderate success. The conclusion of the experiment was that retaining the line was the best solution provided that the line could be separated from the street and modernized. In the following decade, separation of rail and road traffic was increased. New bogie rolling stock was acquired, similar to two cars built for the line in the late 1940s.

In 1970, a new depot and station was built at Forch, together with a new section of line and underpass under the new main road. Between 1973 and 1976 a tunnel was built under the village of Zumikon, eliminating the street section through that village. In 1976, new Tram 2000 trains were introduced and a regular 15-minute train frequency was introduced. By 1979 the line had been doubled as far as Neue Forch.

Projected extensions to Zürich Hauptbahnhof and Wetzikon were under consideration as early as 1979, but have yet to become reality. In 1990, the line was added to the ZVV transportation network, and in 1995 a new terminus was built at Esslingen. In 2004, new low floor cars were acquired from Stadler to replace the 1950s stock. In 2007, the terminus at Stadelhofen was realigned.

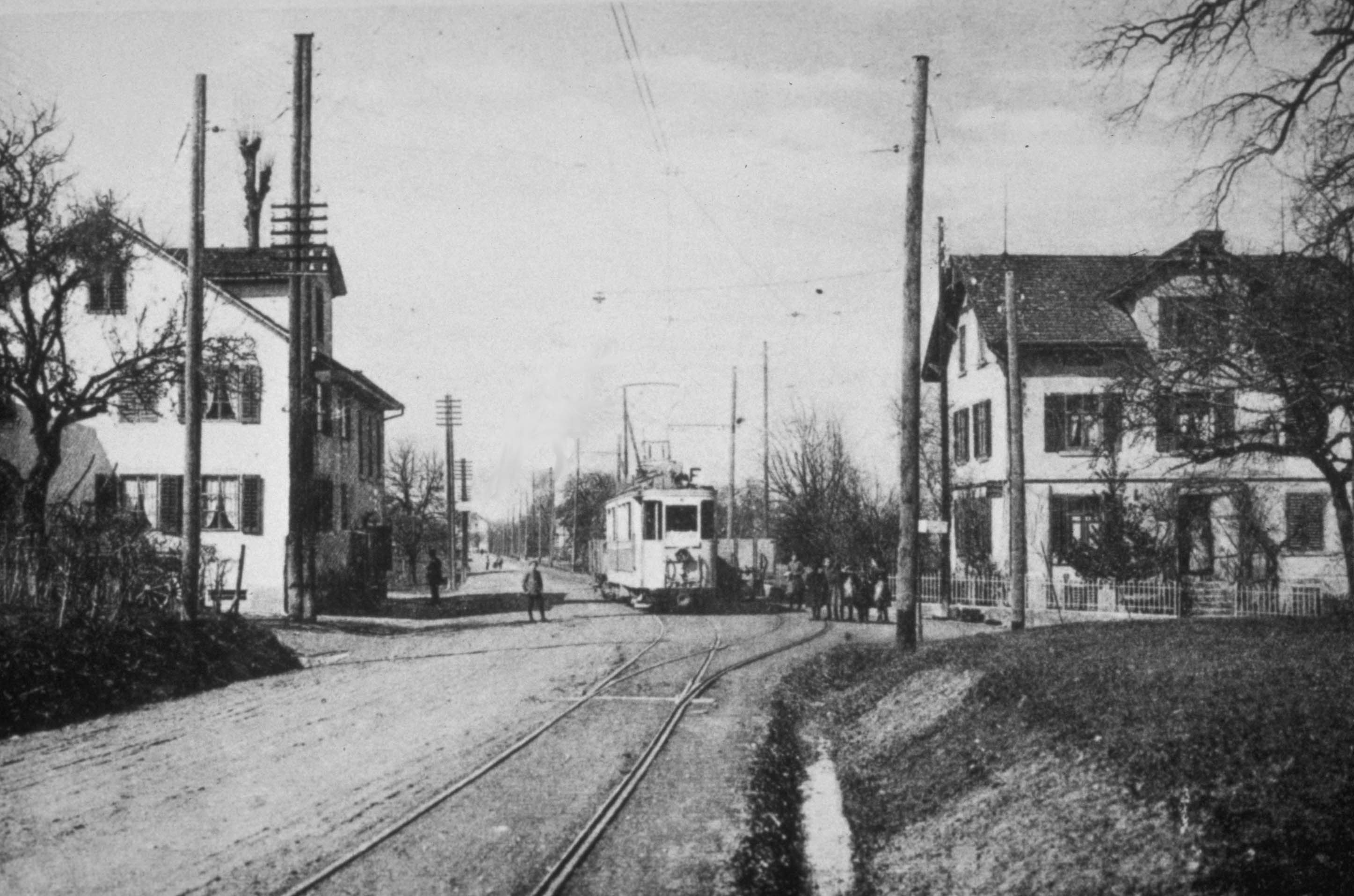
The line in Zollikerberg in 1915

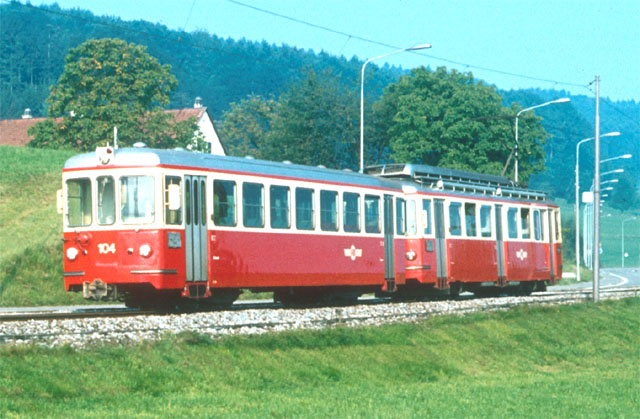
A train at Neue Forch in 1982

== Operation ==
=== Route ===
The line starts from Zürich Stadelhofen FB at Stadelhoferplatz, outside the main line Stadelhofen station, where the line terminates on a loop with its own two platforms. The Forchbahn platforms are flanked by platforms for tram routes 2 and 4 of the Zürich tram system (routes 8 and 11 respectively before network revision on 14.12.2025), which share tracks with the initial stretch of the Forchbahn.

Between Stadelhofen and Rehalp, the Forchbahn trains use the tracks of the tram system, owned by the Verkehrsbetriebe Zürich (VBZ), which are electrified at 600 V DC and are largely situated in the street. Between these two points, Forchbahn trains serve intermediate tram stops at Kreuzplatz (where tram route 2 diverges), Hegibachplatz and Balgrist.

At Rehalp tram route 4 has its terminus, and the Forchbahn trains enter the line's separate Rehalp station. Here they join the Forchbahn proper, which is electrified on the overhead system at 1200 V DC. From Rehalp to the Waltikon station the line uses a roadside double track alignment, and serves the intermediate stations of Waldburg, Spital Zollikerberg and Zollikerberg.

Immediately after leaving Waltikon station, the line enters a double track tunnel under the village of Zumikon, serving the underground stations of Zumikon and Maiacher. The line surfaces just before entering Neue Forch station, where it resumes its roadside alignment. The next section of line, between Neue Forch and Forch, is single track, to be double tracked in the 2020s. The line's headquarters is situated at the 1970s Forch station, which includes a depot complex.

After Forch the line passes under the motor way built 1970 before returning to its alignment alongside the old road. The remainder of the line is single track, and serves intermediate stations at Scheuren, Neuhaus bei Hinteregg, Hinteregg, Egg, Langwies and Emmat. All these stops include passing loops, with the exception of Langwies and Emmat. The line terminates at the modern Esslingen station, which has three tracks and an overall roof.

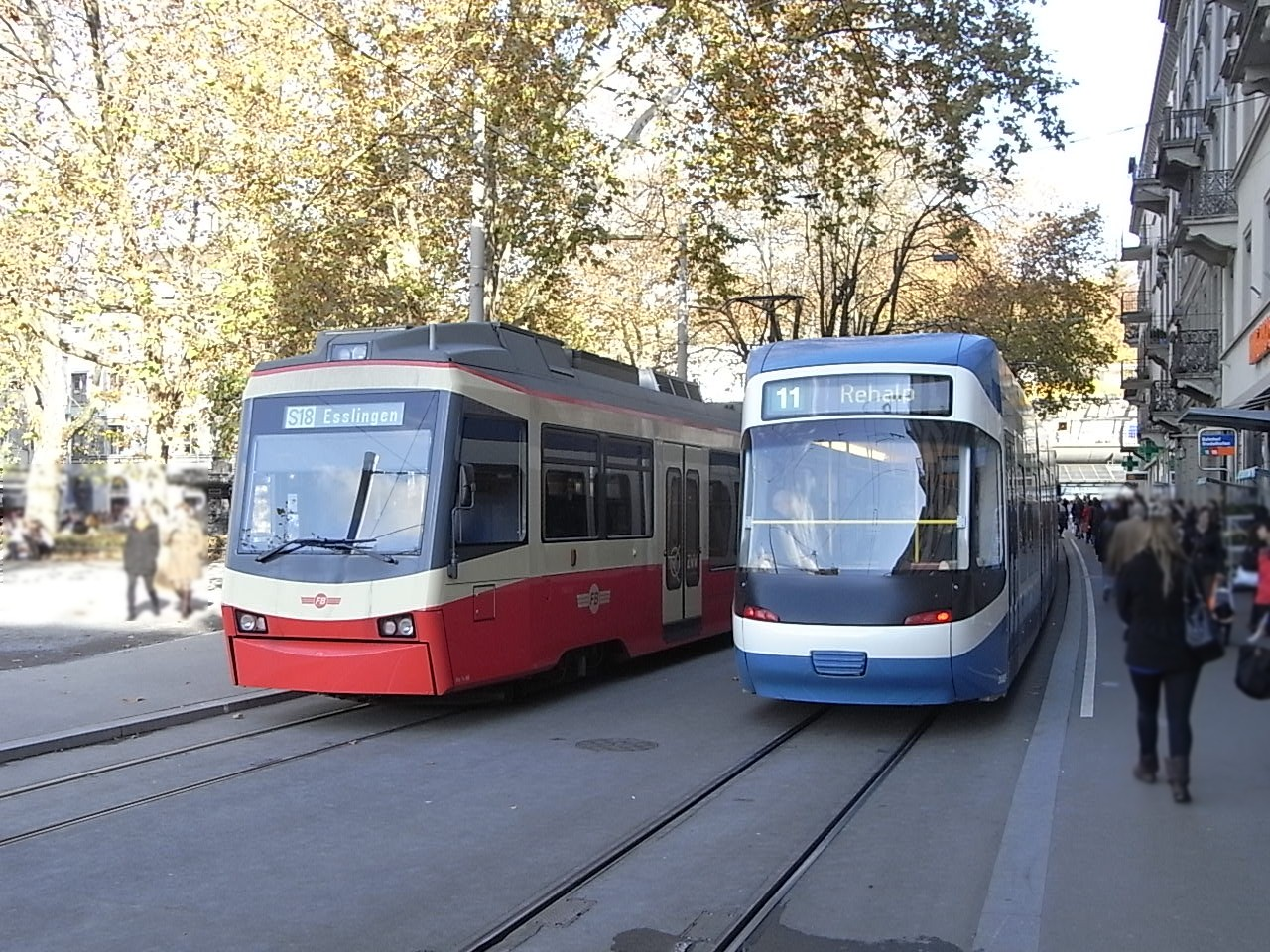
Forchbahn and city trams at the Stadelhofen terminus

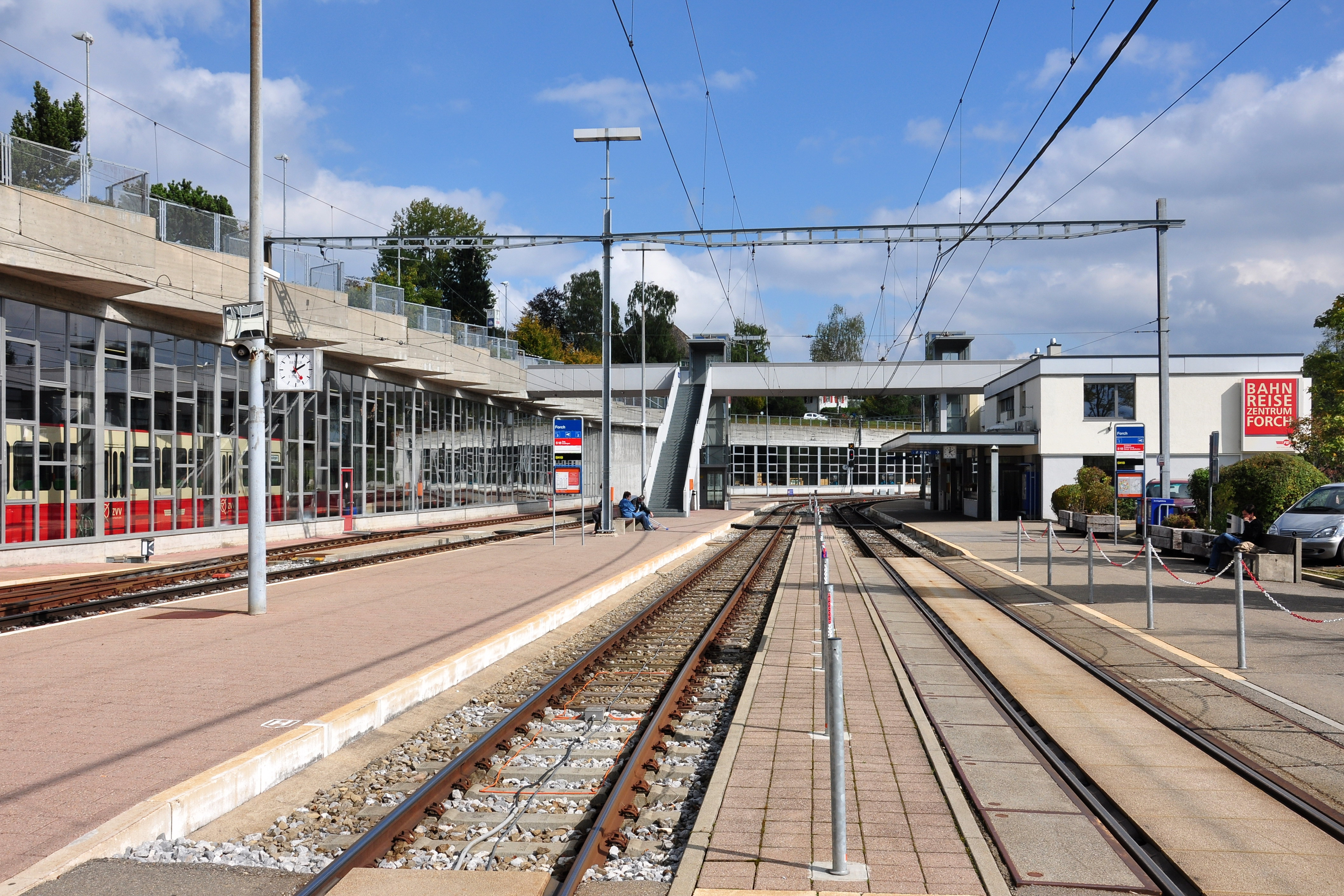
The station and depot at Forch

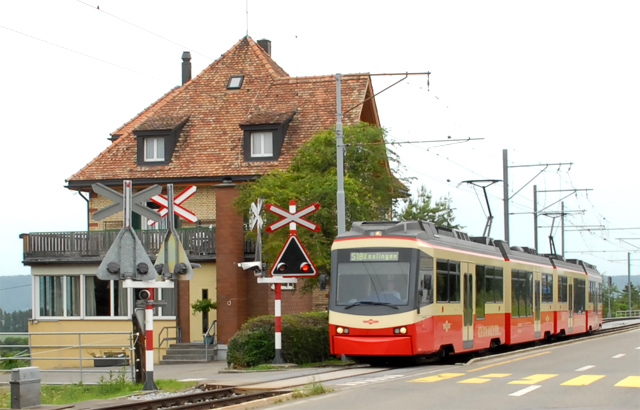
A train on roadside single track near Neue Forch station

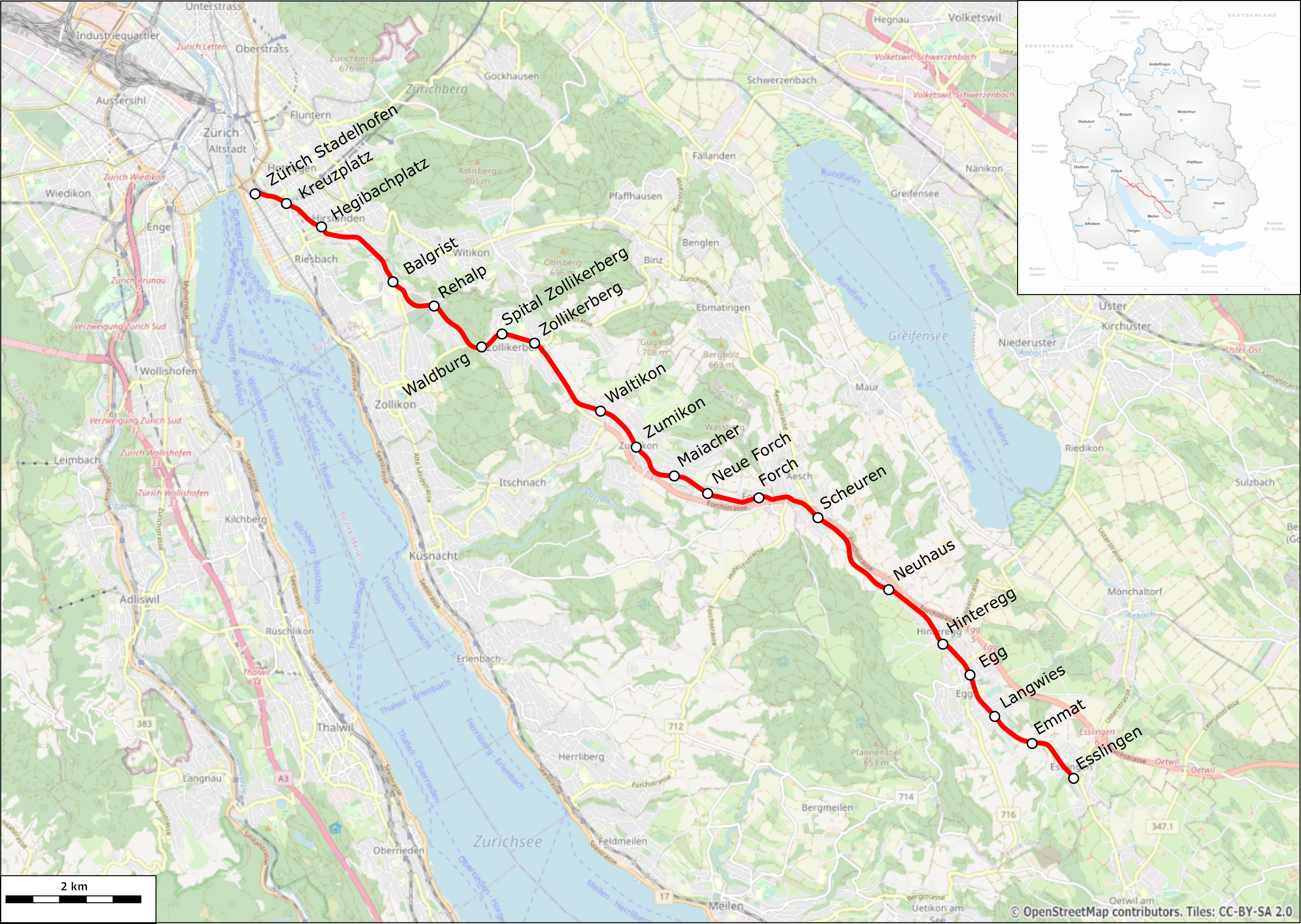
Location map of Forchbahn

=== Services ===
- S18 Zürich Stadelhofen–Zürich Rehalp–Forch–Esslingen

The passenger services on the line forms part of the Zürich S-Bahn, branded as the S18. The standard Zürcher Verkehrsverbund (ZVV) zonal fare tariffs apply to the line.

During the day, trains calling at all stops run every 15 minutes from Stadelhofen to Forch, with every second train continuing to Esslingen. At peak periods, four express trains per hour run to Esslingen without stopping between Rehalp and Forch, whilst another four trains per hour provide a stopping service as far as Forch. Stopping trains take about 35 minutes to cover the full journey, with express trains some 5 minutes faster.

=== Rolling stock ===
Trailer car, B 119 originally built 1930 for Lausanne Tramways, was preserved in the Zürich Tram Museum from 2007 until 2021. In spring 2021 it was regauged for 760 mm (2 ft 5 15/16 in) Bosnian gauge and is used for heritage trains on the Agnita railway line in Romania.

After the 1950/60 stock was rendered surplus by the new Stadler cars, the Forchbahn motor cars BDe 4/4 11 to 16, and driving trailers Bt 101 to 108 (less the scrapped Bt 107) were donated to the municipality of Antananarivo in Madagascar. The vehicles were shipped to Madagascar in 2004/5, for use in creating a suburban train service, but by 2021 they were still in store there. In 2021, according to a news item in the madegassian paper «La Vérité», using the trailer cars for a jungle express in the south east of the island was proposed.

==== Current ====
The line uses the following rolling stock:

Image	Numbers	Type	Manufacturer	Notation	Year	Notes
	21/22-31/32	Tram 2000	SWS / SIG / BBC	Be 8/8	1976-1986	Units comprising pairs of motor cars permanently coupled back-to-back with a drivers cab at each end of the unit, and doors on both sides.
	51-58	Tram 2000	SWS / SIG / BBC	Be 4/4	1994	Motor cars, with a cab at one end and doors on both sides.
	201-204	Tram 2000	SWS / SIG / BBC	Bt	1981-1982	Unpowered driving trailer cars, for use with type tram 2000 units 21/22-31/32 and 51–58, with a cab at one end and doors on both sides.
	61-73	Stadler Tango	Stadler	Be 4/6	2004	Articulated motor cars, with a cab at one end and doors on both sides. Cars have a partial low floor, with low level entry. The cars were built by Stadler Rail to a custom design, but including components from their GTW standard product.

==== Preserved ====
Image	Number	Notation	Year	Notes
	4	CFe 2/2	1912	Four wheeled motor car from the original fleet purchased for the opening of the line. Preserved in the line's original blue livery, and used on special services.
	10	BDe 4/4	1948	Bogie motor car from the generation of vehicles that formed part of the renewal of the line in the 1950s. Preserved and used on special services.
	11	C	1912	Four wheeled trailer car from the original fleet purchased for the opening of the line. Preserved in the line's original blue livery, and used on special services.

== See also ==
- Rail transport in Switzerland
- List of railway stations in Zurich
- Public transport in Zurich
- ZVV fare zones
