= Zürich Stadelhofen FB railway station =

Train station and tram stop in the centre of the Swiss city of Zürich

Zürich Stadelhofen FB
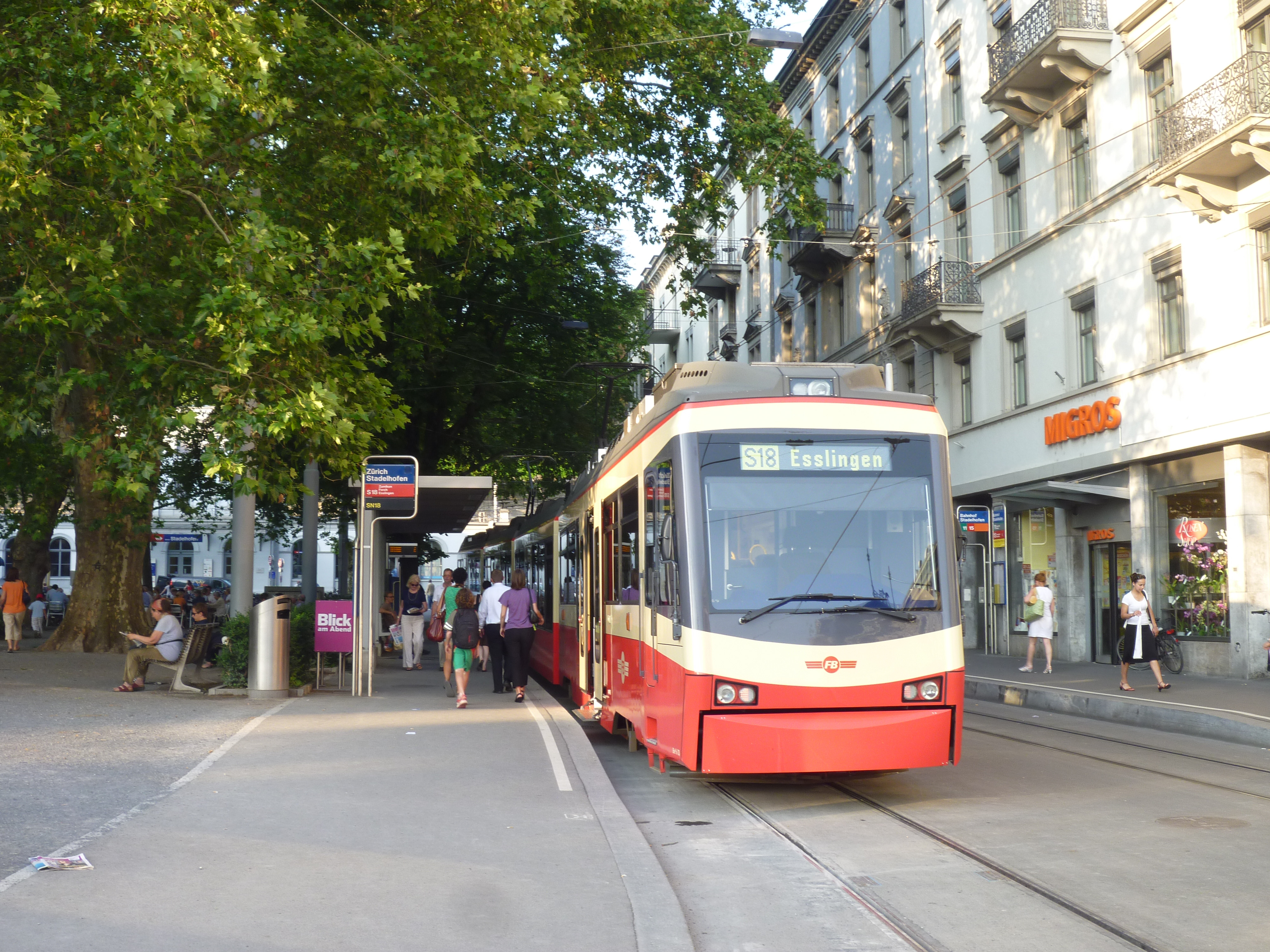
- A Forchbahn train at the stop in 2010

General information
- Location: Zürich; Switzerland
- Coordinates: 47°21′59″N 8°32′53″E
- Elevation: 409 m (1,342 ft)
- Owner: Verkehrsbetriebe Zürich
- Train operators: Forchbahn AG
- Connections: ZVV at stop Opernhaus
- Tram: VBZ trams 11 and 15
- Bus: AZZK buses 912 916

Other information
- Fare zone: ZVV 110

Services
Preceding station	Zurich S-Bahn	Following station
Terminus	S18	Zürich Kreuzplatz towards Esslingen
Terminus	SN18 Limited service	Zürich Kreuzplatz towards Egg
Preceding station	Zürich tramway network	Following station
Bellevue towards Geissweid	2	Zürich Kreuzplatz towards Klusplatz
Bellevue towards Zürich Hauptbahnhof	4	Zürich Kreuzplatz towards Zürich Rehalp
Bellevue towards Laubegg	5	Terminus
Location

Zürich Stadelhofen FB railway station (German: Haltestellen Zürich Stadelhofen FB) is a tram stop on the Stadelhoferplatz in Zurich, Switzerland, within fare zone 110 of the Zürcher Verkehrsverbund (ZVV). It is located in front of the Zürich Stadelhofen mainline railway station. Lines 2, 4, and 5 of the Zurich tram network stop here, too. The station is also the terminus of trains running on the suburban Forchbahn (FB), designated as S18 on the Zürich S-Bahn, which shares the tram lines between Zürich Stadelhofen and Zürich Rehalp.

== Layout ==
Passengers board trams or S18 trains from one of three stop locations on the streets encircling the Stadelhoferplatz. Tram lines Nos. 2, 4, and 5 stop on the exterior of the loop. The S18 comes off the Kreuzbühlstrasse and terminates along the interior of the loop. Another stop, Opernhaus, is located across the side on the Seefeldstrasse and is served by tram lines 11 and 15.

== Services ==
As of the December 2024 timetable change, the following services stop at Zürich Stadelhofen FB:

- Zurich S-Bahn:
  - S18: service every fifteen minutes to Forch and every half-hour to Esslingen.
  - Nighttime S-Bahn (only during weekends):
    - SN18: hourly service to Egg.

== See also ==
- List of railway stations in Zurich
- Public transport in Zurich
- Rail transport in Switzerland
