= Zurich S-Bahn =

Train line network from Switzerland

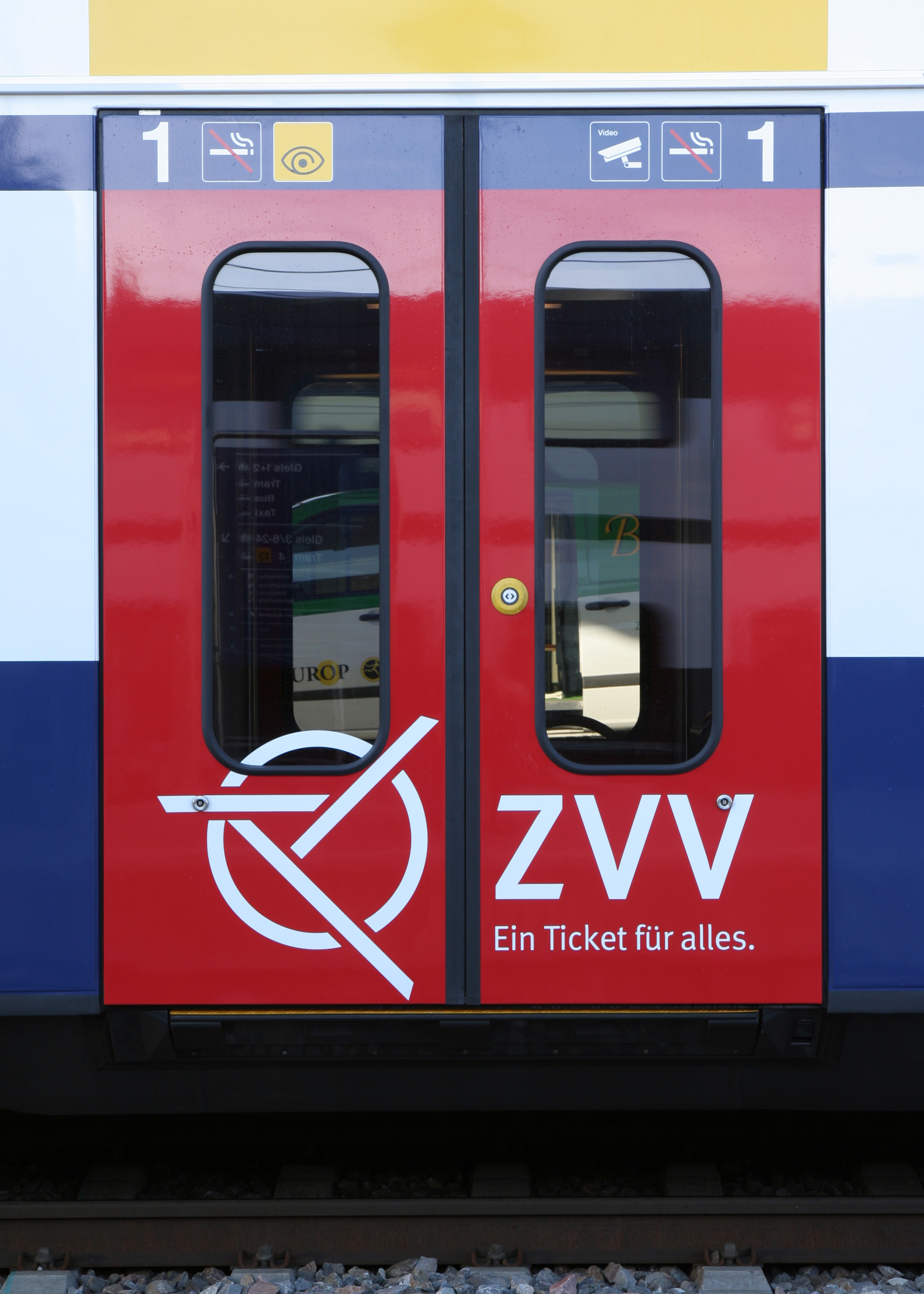
- ZVV logo on the door of an SBB CFF FFS RABe 514.

Overview
- Locale: Zurich, Switzerland
- Transit type: S-Bahn
- Number of lines: 32
- Number of stations: 171
- Annual ridership: 220,000,000 (2025)

Operation
- Began operation: 1990; 36 years ago
- Operators: SBB CFF FFS; Thurbo; SZU; SOB; FB; AVA

Technical
- System length: 380 km (240 mi)
- Track gauge: 1,435 mm (4 ft 8 1/2 in) standard gauge 1,000 mm (3 ft 3 3/8 in) metre gauge Some dual gauge track
Zurich S-Bahn
As of 2020

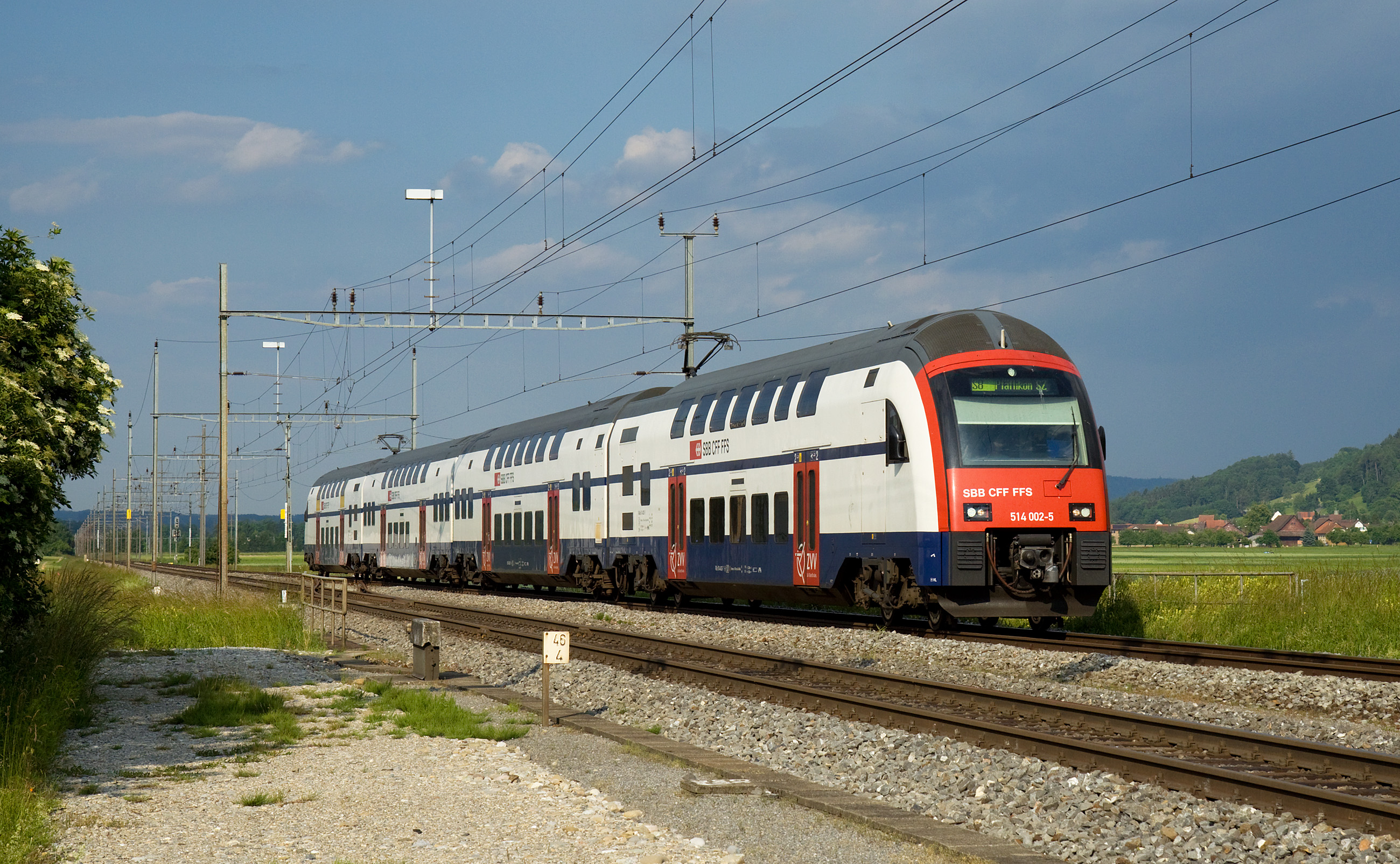
Siemens RABe 514 "DTZ" on the S8 service, which extends into Thurgau

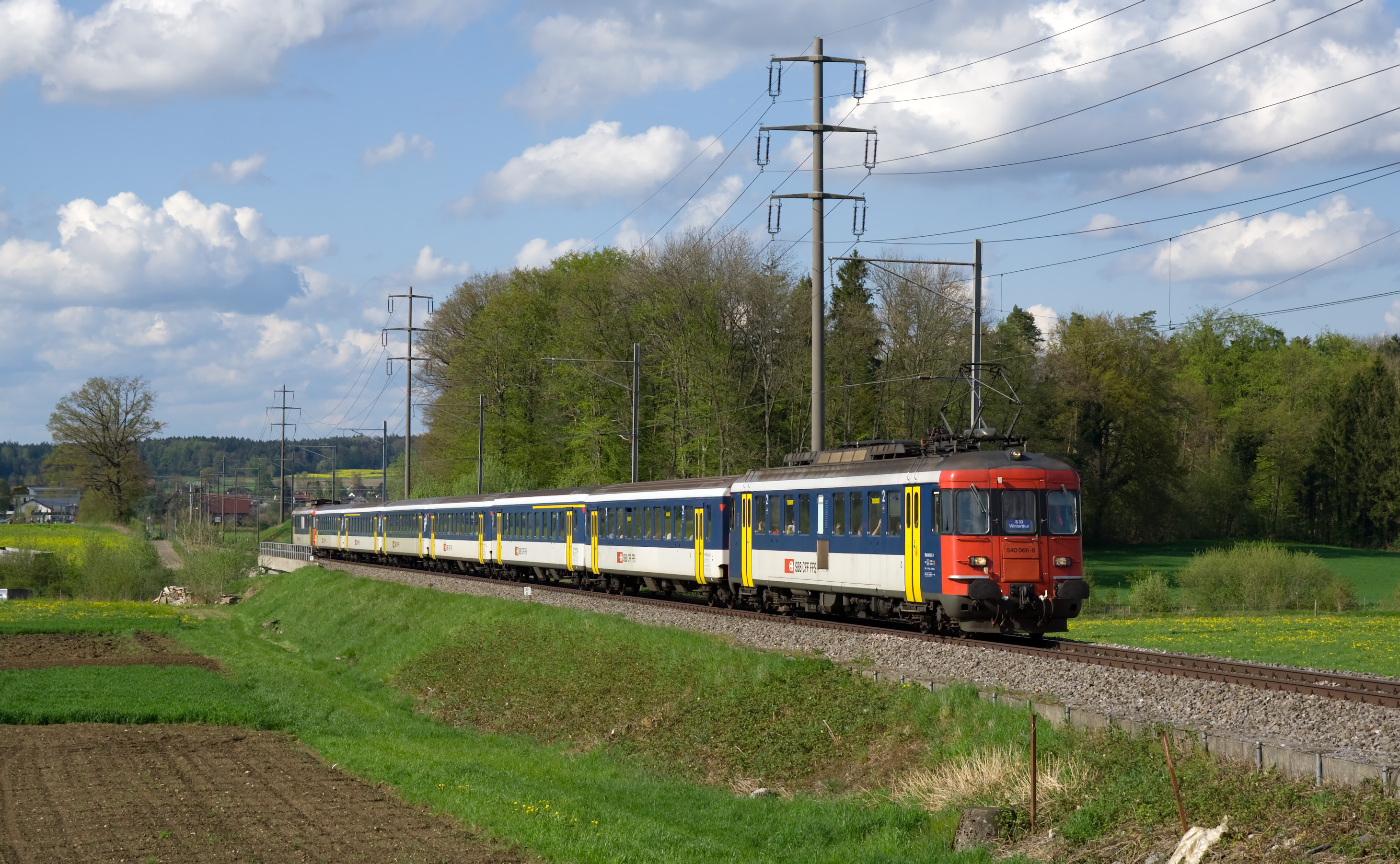
1960s rolling stock (RBe 540 multiple units and rebuilt EW I coaches)

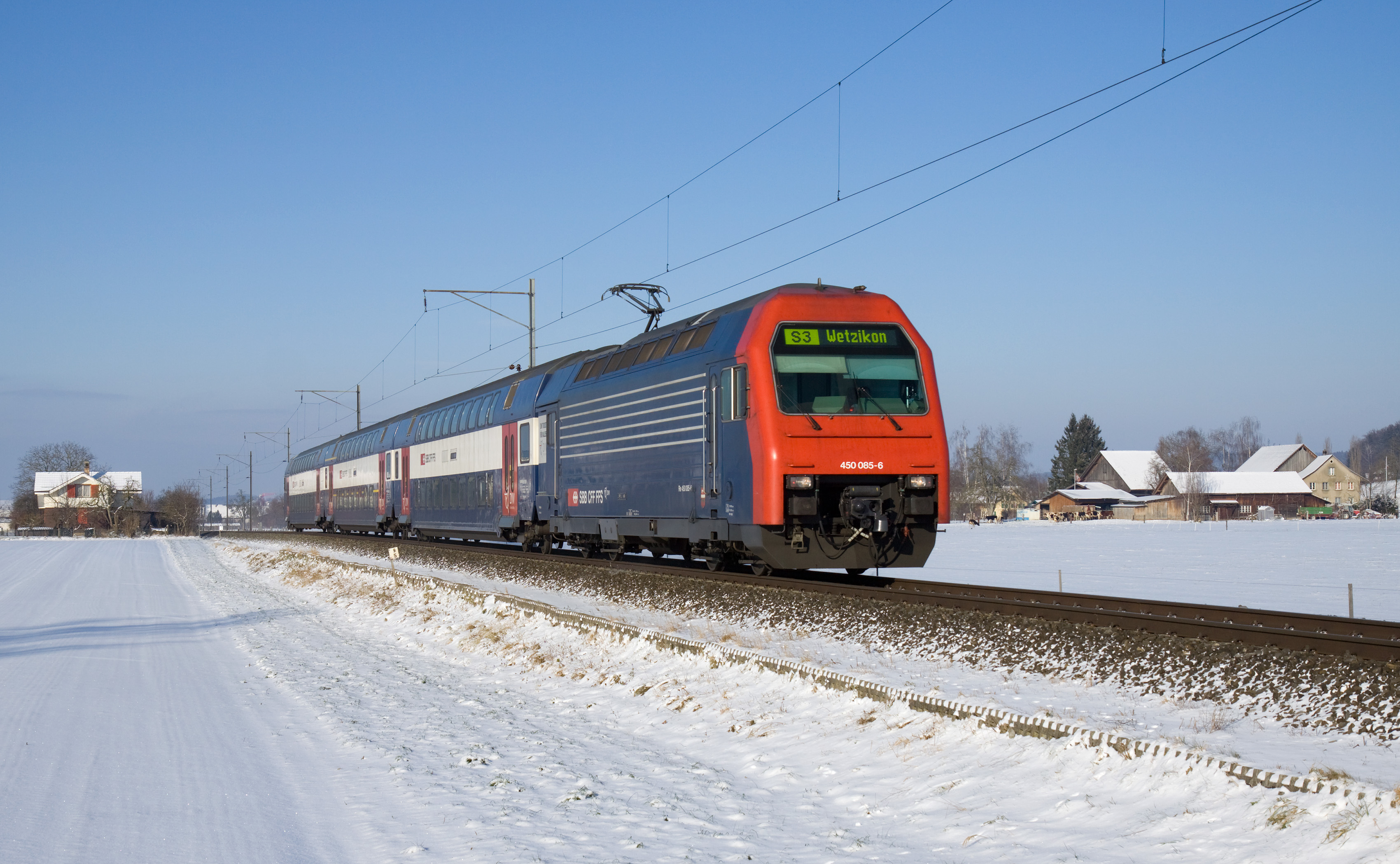
The "DPZ" trains form the largest part of the fleet (Re 450 locomotive, B and AB coaches, Bt control car)

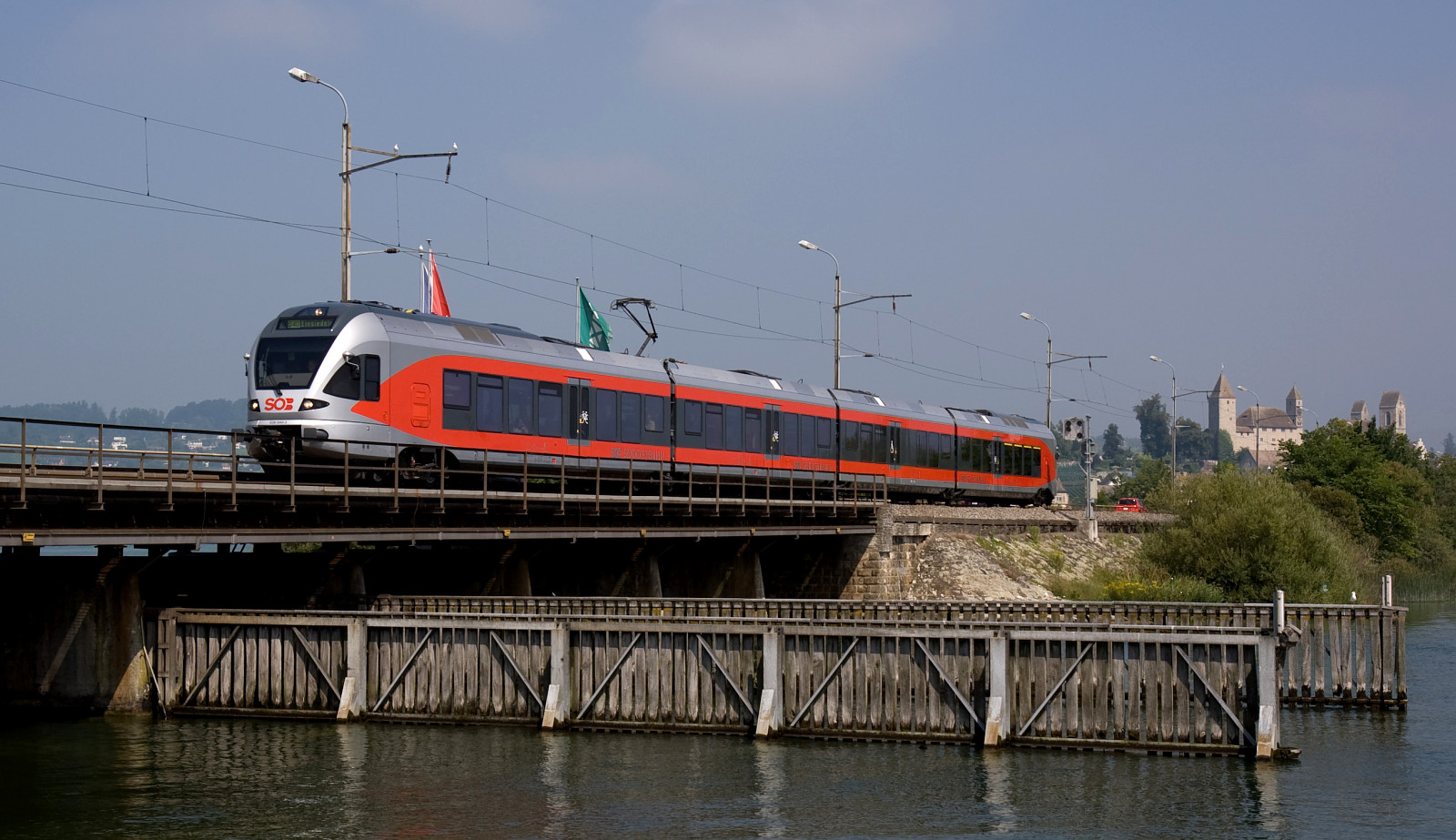
SOB FLIRT on the S40 service

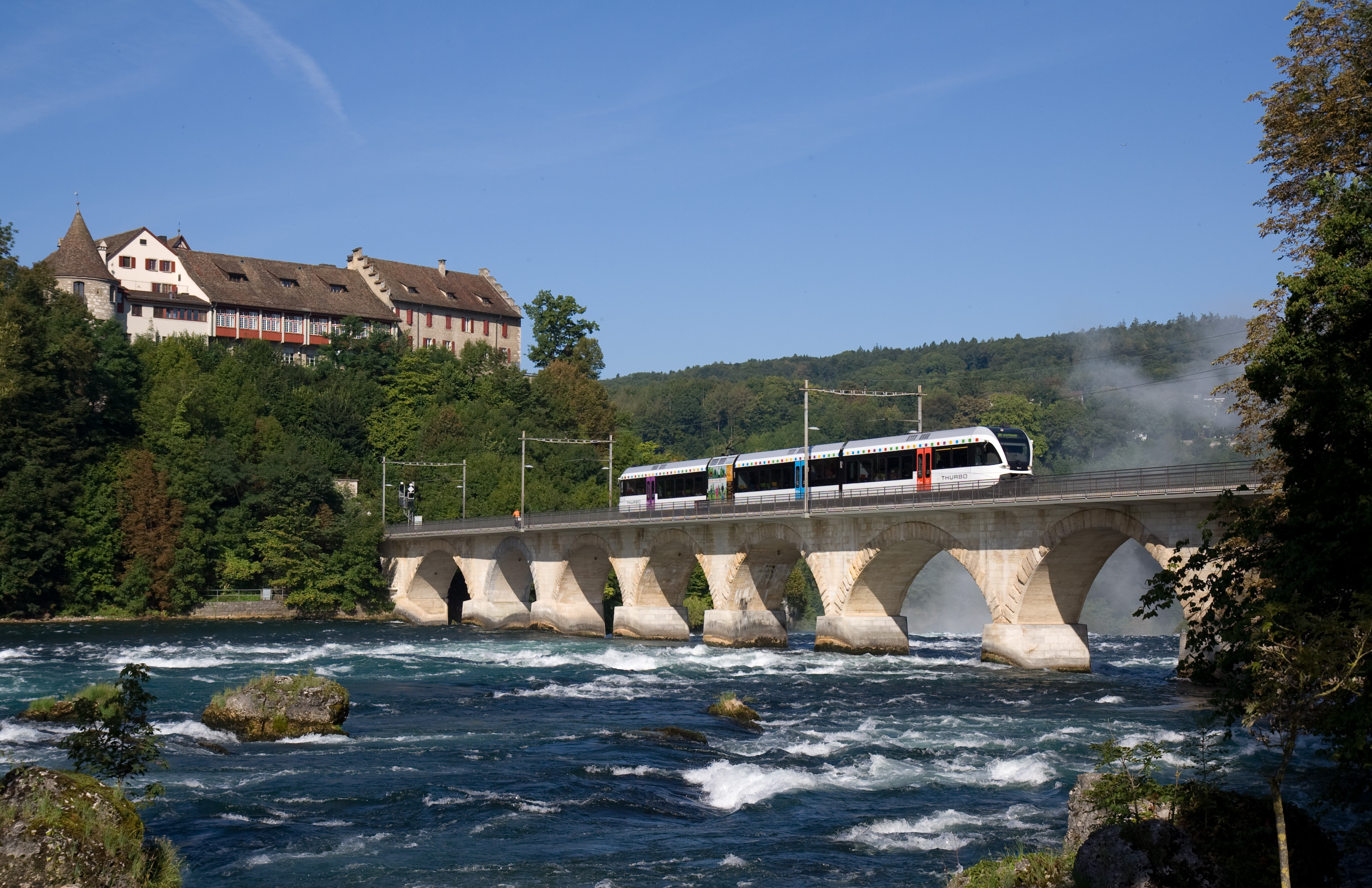
THURBO operated Stadler GTW on the S33 service

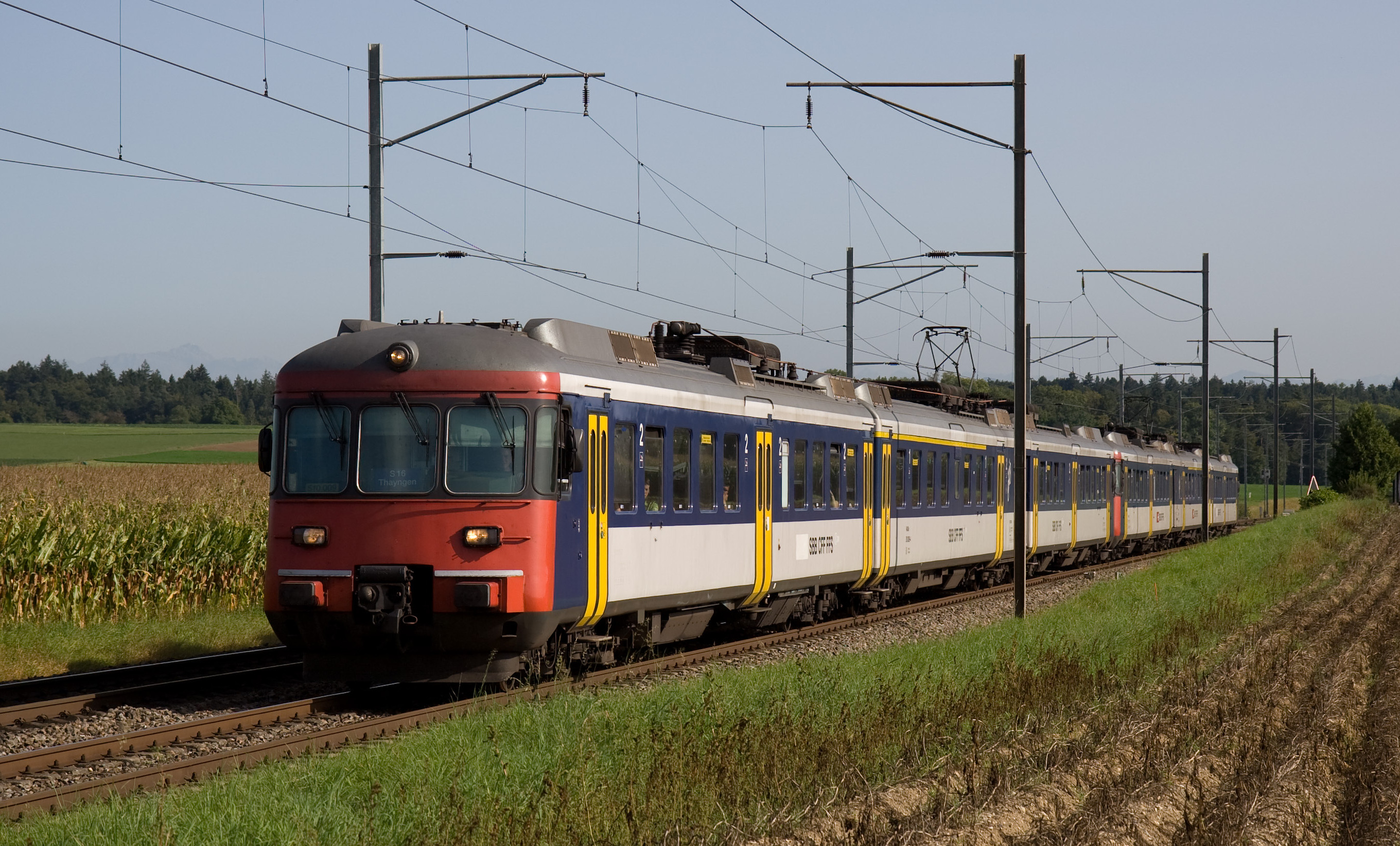
RABDe 510 "Mirage" trainsets, used until 2008, now scrapped

The Zurich S-Bahn (German: S-Bahn Zürich) system is a network of rail lines that has been incrementally expanded to cover the ZVV area, which comprises the entire canton of Zurich and portions of neighbouring cantons (Aargau, Glarus, Schaffhausen, Schwyz, St. Gallen, Thurgau and Zug), with a few lines extending into or crossing the territory of southern Germany. The network is one of many commuter rail operations in German speaking countries to be described as an S-Bahn. The lines connect with services of Aargau S-Bahn to the West, Basel S-Bahn (only in Waldshut) and Schaffhausen S-Bahn to the North, St. Gallen S-Bahn to the East, and Lucerne S-Bahn/Zug Stadtbahn to the South, as well as with InterCity, InterRegio and RegioExpress services at major junction stations.

The entire ZVV S-Bahn network went into operation in May 1990, although many of the lines were already in operation.

Unusual among rapid transit services, the Zurich S-Bahn provides first class commuter travel; about a quarter of seats on each train are first class.

== History ==
Before the construction of the Zurich S-Bahn, most trains to Zurich terminated at Zürich Hauptbahnhof (lit. 'Zurich Main Station'), apart from the Sihltal Zürich Uetliberg Bahn lines which terminated at Zürich Selnau. Originally built as a west-facing terminus, the Hauptbahnhof acted as a terminus for trains coming from all directions. It was connected to lines to the north and northeast via the Wipkingen Tunnel and Zürich Oerlikon railway station. The Hauptbahnhof was also connected via the Letten Tunnel to the Lake Zurich right-bank railway line to the southeast. This line also stopped at Stadelhofen station at the opposite side of the city centre, before passing through the single track tunnel to Letten station, then turning 180 degrees to reach the Hauptbahnhof. This line travelled 5 km (3.1 mi) to cover the 1.5 km (0.93 mi) distance between Stadelhofen and the Hauptbahnhof.

=== Gold Coast Express ===
The first step in developing Zurich's rail system which eventually led to the establishment of the S-Bahn was the establishment of the so-called Gold Coast Express (German: Goldküstenexpress) on 26 May 1968 between Zurich Stadelhofen and Rapperswil via Meilen along the wealthy north shore of Lake Zurich, popularly known as the Gold Coast. This development came about because, after World War II, there was a rapid expansion of commuting to Zurich from the former wine-growing villages along the railway line, which originally opened in 1894. As a result, commuters complained that the trains were overcrowded, slow and often delayed.

The canton of Zurich began to develop a project to improve the railway in the 1950s. Because it was not used by either long-distance passenger or freight trains, improvements in local services were possible. Double track sections were built between Kuesnacht and Herrliberg and between Stäfa and Uerikon, along with new stations. The main problem was finance. Development of the line would only serve local interests and would not lead to increased revenue for Swiss Federal Railways (SFR). At the time the canton and cities affected could not fund improvements to an SFR line, so the law was changed to allow local contributions.

The new Gold Coast Express service operated a regular schedule every half-hour, with the total journey time for the distance of 36 kilometres (22 miles) reduced from the previous 60 to 40 minutes. The most striking feature of the improved railway was the three-car claret-coloured RABDe 12/12 electric multiple units. These had good acceleration and braking performance and immediately became known as "Mirages", after the jet fighters. The modern features of the Mirages included automatically closing doors, which allowed short stops at stations and a reduction in travel time.

=== U-Bahn rejection ===
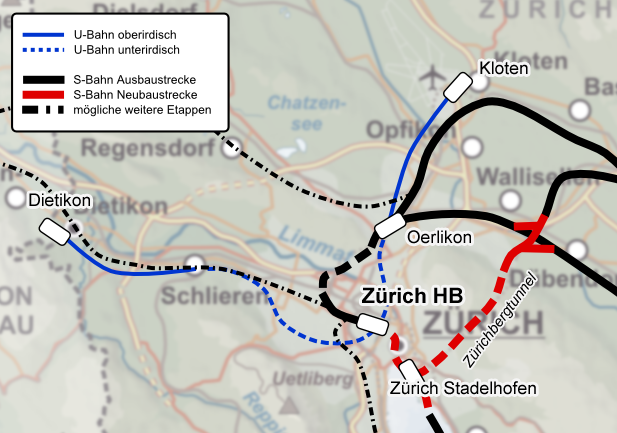
Map of the 1970s proposal for a combined U-Bahn and S-Bahn

On 30 May 1959 some voters put two proposals to the Zurich city council. The first would have allocated CHF 200,000 for a study on the construction of a two-line U-bahn (underground railway) with lines from Enge to Kloten and from Altstetten to Tiefenbrunnen; but it was opposed by the majority of the City Council and failed. The second motion proposed the establishment of a company to build and operate a Zurich U-Bahn. The city had already considered such a proposal and opposed it, on the basis that Zurich was not big enough for an underground railway, and it would cost too much. In a referendum on 14 February 1960, 69.8% of voters voted "no" to the proposal.

Following further work and the enactment of a new transport act, the regional public transport authorities presented a new proposal for a combined regional U-Bahn and S-Bahn system, with the latter being a railway network centred on a tunnel under the city centre, which would connect to existing suburban railway lines. From Zurich Airport, an U-Bahn line would run via Glattbrugg, Oerlikon, Hirschenwiesen, Central, Zürich Hauptbahnhof, Stauffacher and Altstetten to Dietikon. Much of the line would have run above ground. The second part of the proposal was the "Zürichberg network", a line from Zürich Hauptbahnhof via a new tunnel under the Zürichberg to Dietlikon to the northeast (not to be confused with Dietikon, which lies to the west of Zurich). The proposed construction of an underground station in Museumstrasse on the north side of the Hauptbahnhof was intended to ease the pressure on the Hauptbahnhof. On 20 May 1973 this proposal was rejected in a referendum, with the "no" vote as high as in the previous referendum. At the referendum, little opposition had been expressed against the proposed S-Bahn lines.

=== Coordination and construction of the S-Bahn ===
Initial construction in 1981–90, creating three tunnels, two new stations and new platforms at the Hauptbahnhof. The closed Letten Tunnel is in gray.

Rail is a major element in Zurich's public transport system, and its upgrade required close collaboration between the canton of Zurich and Swiss Federal Railways (SBB CFF FFS), the owner of most of the railways. The SBB CFF FFS had insufficient resources for a substantial upgrade of commuter services. On the other hand, the canton of Zurich could not fund an alternative transport network.

The first step towards cooperation came in 1978 with the establishment of a Transport Fund providing CHF 40 million annually for urban transport. The routes of today's S-Bahn were established in a debate in the cantonal Council on 19 June 1978. Alternative "eastern" and "western" options were discussed. Under the western option the northern end of the central tunnel from the Hauptbahnhof would have connected with Oerlikon, while in the eastern option it would have tunneled under the Zürichberg and ended near Dietlikon. The cantonal Council chose the eastern option by 85 votes to 36.

At a referendum on 29 November 1981, Zurich's voters approved by a two-thirds majority a loan of CHF 520 million for the construction of the core of the S-Bahn. The following changes were made:

- The construction of the Hirschengraben tunnel between the Hauptbahnhof and Stadelhofen. Four new platforms were built under the existing Hauptbahnhof, along with connections to the existing western lines. The Letten Tunnel and station were closed.
- The construction of the Zürichberg Tunnel, which connected Stadelhofen to lines to the northeast, as well as having a new station at Stettbach.
- The extension of the Sihltal Zürich Uetliberg Bahn lines from Selnau to the Hauptbahnhof, with the Selnau terminus closed and replaced with an underground through station.
- The opening of Hardbrücke railway station in 1982, between the Hauptbahnhof and Altstetten to the west.
- The redevelopment of Stadelhofen station, with an architecture award-winning design by Santiago Calatrava.

=== Opening and expansion ===
On 27 May 1990, the S-Bahn was brought into operation and the Zürcher Verkehrsverbund (Zurich Transport Network) began operations. For the first time, one could travel on trains, buses and trams with just one ticket. Despite "teething problems", passenger numbers increased rapidly. Since the opening of the S-Bahn, travel volumes have increased by about 60%. In several stages, S-Bahn services were expanded to a 380 kilometres (236 miles) rail network, and peak hour express trains were added.

The first stage of the expansion addressed the chronic overcrowding of trains on the S12 route between Dietikon and Zurich, requiring improvements in the Limmat valley. The widening of the railway to four tracks between Dietikon and Killwangen allowed the separation of the S-Bahn from the long-distance and freight services. The new S3 service introduced as a result complemented the S12 service, to provide a train every 15 minutes on the route. At the same time the sections of the S9 route via Knonau were upgraded to allow services to be increased to each half hour. Services on the north side of Lake Zurich were increased with trains provided every 15 minutes by S6, S7 and S16 services. A new station was opened at Glanzberg between Dietikon and Schlieren.

Under the second stage of expansion in December 2002, night trains were added to the S-Bahn. Since 2007, night trains provide a continuous 24-hour service from Friday morning until Sunday evening on some lines.

The third stage expansion was completed in 2007. On 12 December 2004 (coinciding with the completion of the first stage of Rail 2000), the S3 service was extended from Dietikon through the Heitersberg Tunnel to Aarau with a new station at Mellingen. On 10 December 2006, S15 was opened between Rapperswil and Birmensdorf following line improvements. It was extended from Birmensdorf to Affoltern am Albis on 9 December 2007. South of Zurich sections of the Sihltalbahn were doubled. On the rural feeder lines around Winterthur (S33 to Schaffhausen, S35 to Wil and S41 to Bülach) services were increased to run every half hour. The S8 was extended from Winterthur to Weinfelden, providing with the existing S30 services two trains an hour on the line. In addition, the S16 was extended every hour to Schaffhausen, stopping after Winterthur only at Andelfingen and Neuhausen am Rheinfall. Moreover, on the line from Winterthur to Wil a new station opened at Winterthur Hegi.

=== Opening of the Weinberg Tunnel ===
Second through line via the Weinberg Tunnel

Following a successful referendum, a project was established to create a new route between the Hauptbahnhof and Oerlikon station. Unlike the existing two routes between the stations, the Weinberg tunnel would approach the Hauptbahnhof from the east, allowing trains to run between the western and northern lines without bypassing the central station. This route was known as Durchmesserlinie Zürich (lit. 'diametral line'), and was for use of both long-distance and S-Bahn trains. The project also included a third set of underground platforms under Zürich Hauptbahnhof, a new elevated route through the western approaches and two extra platforms at Oerlikon.

Breakthrough of the new Weinberg Tunnel was achieved in November 2010, and it was opened to traffic on the 14 June 2014. On the same date, the new platforms, also known as the Löwenstrasse station, were opened. Whilst the other works are still outstanding and expected to be completed in 2015, the partial completion resulted in significant changes to the Zurich S-Bahn.

These changes included the diversion of lines S2, S8 and S14 through the Weinberg Tunnel. These lines previously ran via Zürich Wipkingen station, and in order to prevent that station losing service, S24 was extended from Zürich Hauptbahnhof station via Wipkingen to Zürich Oerlikon station. At the same time, the former Glarner Sprinter, a two-hourly train service from Zürich Hauptbahnhof to Linthal, was replaced with a new hourly S-Bahn service, the S25. These major changes resulted in a number of other changes, with service to various stations being provided by different lines.

== Operation ==
=== Current services ===
As of the December 2021 timetable change, 32 services comprise the Zurich S-Bahn network. The lines are numbered (2‒21, 23‒26, 29‒30, 33, 35‒36, 40‒42) using the prefix "S", which is typical for S-Bahn systems. With the exception of lines S13, S17, S18, S26, S29, S30, S33, S35, S36, S40, and S41, all routes run through or terminate at Zurich main station. The S27 service between Siebnen-Wangen and Ziegelbrücke, operated by SOB during peak-hours, is neither part of the Zurich S-Bahn nor the St. Gallen S-Bahn network.

Unless noted otherwise, all services operate every 30 minutes throughout the day and follow a strict, regular timetable. This is known in the German speaking world as a Taktfahrplan, or clock-face scheduling in English. There may be additional trains during peak periods, and a reduced frequency in the evenings and/or at weekends. Timely connecting services often exist at junction stations.

#	Route	Notes	Operator
S2	Zürich Flughafen –Oerlikon–Zürich HB–Thalwil–Pfäffikon SZ–Ziegelbrücke	Non-stop between Enge and Thalwil, Thalwil and Horgen, Horgen and Wädenswil, Richterswil and Pfäffikon SZ, Siebnen-Wangen and Ziegelbrücke.	SBB
S3	(Bülach–) Hardbrücke–Zürich HB–Effretikon–Wetzikon	Operates between Hardbrücke and Bülach only during peak-hours.	SBB
S4	Zürich HB–Adliswil–Langnau-Gattikon (–Sihlwald)	Operates every 20 minutes between Zürich HB and Langnau-Gattikon; one train per hour continues to Sihlwald.	SZU
S5	Zug–Affoltern am Albis–Zürich HB–Uster–Wetzikon–Rapperswil–Pfäffikon SZ	Stops only at selected stations between Zürich HB and Wetzikon. Non-stop between Stadelhofen and Uster, Uster and Wetzikon, Rapperswil and Pfäffikon SZ.	SBB
S6	Baden AG–Regensdorf-Watt–Hardbrücke–Zürich HB–Uetikon		SBB
S7	Winterthur–Kloten–Hardbrücke–Zürich HB–Meilen–Rapperswil	Non-stop between Zürich Stadelhofen and Meilen. Non-stop between Winterthur and Effretikon (except late in the evening).	SBB
S8	Winterthur–Wallisellen–Oerlikon–Zürich HB–Thalwil–Freienbach SBB-Pfäffikon SZ (–Ziegelbrücke)	Non-stop between Winterthur and Effretikon.	SBB
S9	(Schaffhausen–) Rafz–Hardbrücke–Zürich HB–Uster	Alternate trains operate between Schaffhausen and Rafz. Currently serves two locations in Germany.	SBB
S10	Zürich HB–Zürich Triemli–Uetliberg	On weekdays, a frequent shuttle operates between Zürich HB and Triemli with a half-hourly train continuing to Uetliberg; at weekends trains run throughout every 20 minutes.	SZU
S11	Aarau–Lenzburg–Dietikon–Zürich HB–Zürich Stettbach–Winterthur–Seuzach/Sennhof-Kyburg (–Wila)	Non-stop between Winterthur and Stettbach; trains operate alternately to Sennhof-Kyburg (Wila during peak-hours) and Seuzach.	SBB
S12	Brugg AG–Zürich HB–Zürich Stettbach– Winterthur–Schaffhausen/Wil SG	Non-stop between Winterthur and Stettbach; trains operate alternately to Schaffhausen and Wil.	SBB
S13	Wädenswil–Samstagern–Einsiedeln		SOB
S14	Affoltern am Albis–Zürich HB–Oerlikon–Uster–Wetzikon–Hinwil		SBB
S15	Niederweningen–Hardbrücke–Zürich HB–Uster–Wetzikon–Rapperswil	Non-stop between Stadelhofen and Uster, Uster and Wetzikon.	SBB
S16	Zürich Flughafen –Hardbrücke–Zürich HB–Herrliberg-Feldmeilen (–Meilen)	Operates to Meilen in the evenings only	SBB
S17	Dietikon–Bremgarten–Bremgarten West–Wohlen	Trains run every half-hour between Dietikon and Wohlen; on weekdays additional trains from Dietikon to Bremgarten West give a train every 15 minutes on that section. Since December 2025, this schedule also applies to the weekends. However, on Sundays, trains only run on the quarter-hour schedule from 12:00 to 20:00, defaulting to a half-hour schedule outside of that time period.	AVA
S18	Zürich Stadelhofen–Zürich Rehalp–Forch–Esslingen	A tram-train service that operates over the Zurich tram network as far as Rehalp, stopping at selected tram stops. Off-peak trains then run every 15 minutes between Zürich Stadelhofen FB and Forch, with alternate trains continuing to Esslingen. At peak periods four trains per hour run to Esslingen not stopping between Rehalp and Forch, whilst another four provide a stopping service to Forch.	FB
S19	(Koblenz–Baden–) Dietikon–Zürich HB–Oerlikon–Effretikon (–Pfäffikon ZH )	Non-stop between Altstetten and Dietikon, Dietikon and Wettingen. Serves the section Koblenz - Dietikon Monday-Friday and the section Effretikon - Pfäffikon ZH during peak hours.	SBB
S20	Uerikon–Zürich HB–Hardbrücke	Peak-hour service. Non-stop between Stadelhofen and Küsnacht, Küsnacht and Meilen, Meilen and Männedorf.	SBB
S21	Regensdorf-Watt–Hardbrücke–Zürich HB	Peak-hour service. No stop at Seebach station.	SBB
S23	Zürich HB–Zürich Stadelhofen–Winterthur–Frauenfeld–Romanshorn	Peak-hour service.	SBB
S24	Thayngen/Weinfelden–Winterthur–Zürich Flughafen –Wipkingen–Zürich HB–Thalwil–Zug	Trains operate alternately to Thayngen (stops only at selected stations) and Weinfelden. Late in the evening, trains end in Effretikon.	SBB
S25	Zürich HB–Pfäffikon SZ–Ziegelbrücke–Glarus–Linthal	Hourly service. Serves only selected stops between Zürich HB and Näfels-Mollis. Half-hourly service between Ziegelbrücke and Schwanden GL in combination with S6 of St. Gallen S-Bahn.	SBB
S26	Winterthur–Bauma–Rüti ZH	Commonly called the Tösstalbahn.	Thurbo
S29	Winterthur–Stein am Rhein		Thurbo
S30	Winterthur–Frauenfeld–Weinfelden (–Romanshorn–Rorschach)	Hourly service. Half-hourly service between Winterthur and Weinfelden in combination with S24	Thurbo
S33	Winterthur–Andelfingen–Schaffhausen	Hourly service. Half-hourly service in combination with S12	SBB
S35	Winterthur–Wil SG	Hourly service. Half-hourly service in combination with S12	Thurbo
S36	Waldshut–Bad Zurzach–Bülach	Hourly service	Thurbo
S40	Rapperswil–Pfäffikon SZ–Samstagern–Einsiedeln	Continues hourly as S6 of St. Gallen S-Bahn between Rapperswil and Schwanden GL. During peak-hours, it is coupled/uncoupled with the Voralpen Express (portion working), and operates as InterRegio between Rapperswil and St. Gallen.	SOB
S41	Winterthur–Bülach		Thurbo
S42	Zürich HB–Othmarsingen–Muri AG	Peak-hour service.	SBB

=== Nighttime services ===
During weekends, in the night from Friday to Saturday and from Saturday to Sunday, there are nighttime S-Bahn services (designated SN followed by the route number) and nighttime bus services (designated N followed by the line number). Nighttime services operate from 1 o'clock until the early morning hours. The nighttime S-Bahn and bus routes form a network, which is different from the daytime network. Most SN services run hourly. As of December 2022, the following nighttime S-Bahn services existed:

#	Route	Operator
SN1	Winterthur – Stettbach – Zürich HB – Dietikon – Baden – Brugg AG – Lenzburg – Aarau	SBB
SN3	Winterthur – Andelfingen – Schaffhausen (– Stein am Rhein)	Thurbo
SN4	Zürich HB – Langnau-Gattikon	SZU
SN5	Knonau – Zürich HB – Uster – Rapperswil – Pfäffikon SZ	SBB
SN6	Würenlos – Zürich HB – Winterthur	SBB
SN7	Bassersdorf – Kloten – Zürich HB – Meilen – Stäfa	SBB
SN8	Pfäffikon ZH – Effretikon – Wallisellen – Zürich HB – Wädenswil – Pfäffikon SZ – Lachen	SBB
SN9	Bülach – Zürich HB – Uster	SBB
SN11	Winterthur – Stettbach – Zürich HB – Mellingen Heitersberg – Lenzburg – Aarau – Olten	SBB
SN18	Zürich Stadelhofen – Egg	FB
SN41	Winterthur – Embrach-Rorbas – Bülach	Thurbo
SN65	Bülach – Rafz – Jestetten – Schaffhausen	Thurbo

=== Previous services ===
- The S1 formerly linked Zurich and Zug via Thalwil. It was renamed the S21 after the opening of the S1 line of the Lucerne-Zug network (Zug Stadtbahn and Lucerne S-Bahn) in 2004 to avoid confusion. It is discontinued and replaced with the part of the line S24.
- The former S11 was a rush hour service. It was subsumed into the S23 in December 2018 when the current S11 service opened.
- The former S12 operated between Brugg and Seuzach/Seen until December 2018.
- The former S21 was subsumed into the S24 after the opening of the Weinberg Tunnel in 2014.
- The S22 formerly linked Bülach with Singen (in Germany) via Schaffhausen. It has been replaced by the S9 and S24 services, respectively, in 2015. A line numbered S22 still ran between Jestetten and Singen (Hohentwiel) until 2018, operated by Thurbo, but this route is currently running as two separate lines of Schaffhausen S-Bahn (S62 and S65).
- The S31 used to run across the Seedamm, between Rapperswil and Pfäffikon SZ.
- The S43 ran between Rüti ZH and Wald ZH (near Rapperswil) and had only three stations and was in fact a limited service of S26. It has been replaced by a bus route.
- The S55 formerly linked Niederweningen and Oberglatt, as a short-working of the S5. It has now been replaced by the S15.
- The S3 formerly operated between Wetzikon and Aarau via Dietikon. However its western route is overtaken by the S11, it runs to Hardbrücke (or Bülach) instead.

=== International services ===
Two Zurich S-Bahn services cross the international border into Germany. Service S9 crosses German territory between Rafz and Schaffhausen (both in Switzerland), calling at the German stations of Lottstetten and Jestetten. These two stations are located entirely on German soil, but all the infrastructure belongs to SBB. Service S36 crosses the border at the end of its journey, in order to terminate at Waldshut station in Germany.

== Future developments ==
Further improvements are envisaged, including two additional tracks at Oerlikon railway station, a passing loop in Pfäffikon and adjustments at various stations. Further improvements in the corridor between the airport and Winterthur are being developed as part of the second stage of Rail 2000 for long-distance trains, which would require further adjustments for the S-Bahn.

In the longer term, a vision for 2030 named Projekt S-Bahn 2G includes the development of two types of S-Bahn services and trains. Inner services will operate every 15 minutes, and will be provided by single-deck trains, so that passengers can embark and disembark quickly. Outer express services will operate every half-hour, stopping at all stations in the outer area but only at principal stations in the inner area, and will be formed of double-deck stock in order to provide more seating for longer journeys.

In September 2014 a study was published for the construction of a new rail tunnel and underground station serving the ETH Hönggerberg "Science City". The new tunnel would run directly between Hardbrücke and Regensdorf stations, as opposed to the indirect route via the existing Käferberg Tunnel and Oerlikon station that is currently used by service S6.

== Rolling stock ==
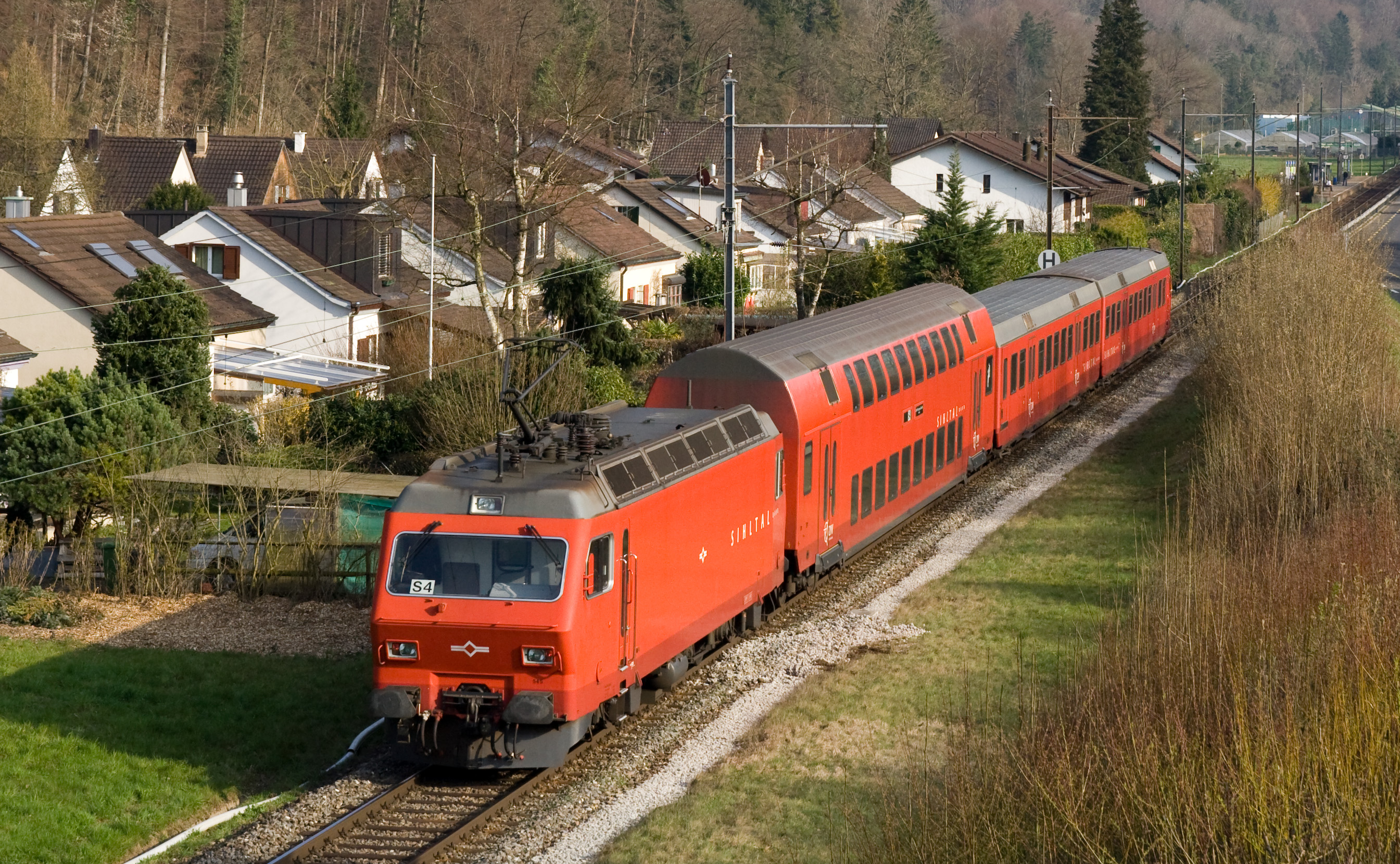
SZU Re 456-hauled trainset near Wildpark-Höfli station

As of December 2024, Zurich S-Bahn uses the following rolling stock:

- DPZ (Doppelstock-Pendelzug, lit. 'double-decker commuter train') trainsets, each with three cars hauled by SBB Re 450 or SZU Re 456 locomotives (115 trainsets)
- SBB CFF FFS RABe 511, four-/six-car bilevel EMUs (50 trainsets)
- SBB CFF FFS RABe 514, also known as DTZ (Doppelstocktriebzug, lit. 'double decker multiple unit'), four-car bilevel EMUs (61 trainsets)
- Refurbished Re 420 LION locomotive-hauled DPZ bilevel coaches (head and tail configuration), used for peak-hour services (15 trainsets)
- SOB Stadler Flirt, four-car single-level EMUs
- Thurbo Stadler GTW, two-/three-car single-level trains
- "KTU" push-pull trainsets, each composed of an SZU Re 456 locomotive and double-deck and single-deck coaches, including one single-deck control car (6 trainsets)
- SZU Be 510 (Uetlibergbahn), three-car single-level EMUs (6 trainsets)
- Stadler ABe 4/8 of AVA operating as S17 service (14 light rail sets)
- Stadler Be 4/6 of Forchbahn operating as S18 service (13 light rail sets)

== See also ==
- Public transport in Zurich
- List of railway stations in Zurich
- Rail transport in Switzerland
