= Forch railway station =

Railway station in Switzerland

Forch
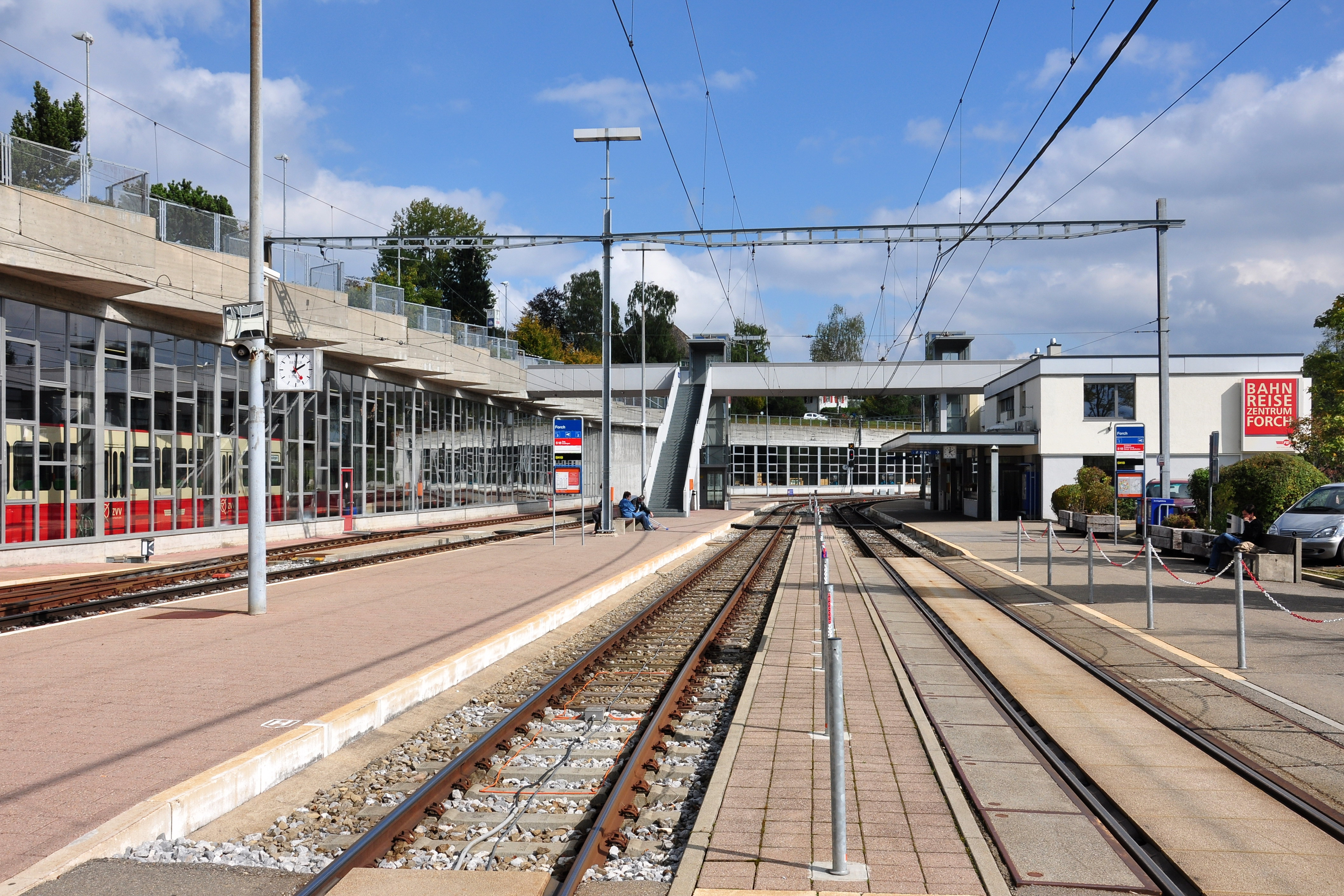
- The station, looking away from Zürich

General information
- Location: Forch, Küsnacht, Zurich; Switzerland
- Coordinates: 47.32532°N 8.64794°E
- Owner: Forchbahn
- Operator: Forchbahn
- Line: Forchbahn

Other information
- Fare zone: 130 (ZVV)

Services
Preceding station	Zurich S-Bahn	Following station
Neue Forch towards Zürich Stadelhofen FB	S18	Scheuren towards Esslingen
Neue Forch towards Zürich Stadelhofen FB	SN18 Limited service	Scheuren towards Egg
Location
- Location within Switzerland Location within Canton of Zurich

Forch is a railway station in the Swiss canton of Zurich and the municipality of Küsnacht, serving the village of Forch. It is the principal intermediate station and headquarters of the Forch Railway (Forchbahn, FB), which is operated as Zurich S-Bahn service S18 and provides links to the city of Zurich and the nearby village of Esslingen. The station lies within fare zone 130 of the Zürcher Verkehrsverbund (ZVV) and is operated by the Forchbahn.

== Location and History ==
The Forchbahn's depot and workshop is adjacent and to the north of the station, and are sheltered by a landscaped roof that blends with the natural contours of the land. The whole complex is situated some 100 metres (330 ft) to the south of the line's original roadside stop and depot. The line was relocated to its current alignment in 1970, including the provision of a new tunnel under the A52 motorway.

== Services ==
The station is served by Zurich S-Bahn line S18, which operates between Zurich and Esslingen. During weekends (Friday and Saturday nights), there is also a nighttime S-Bahn service (SN18) offered by ZVV. As of the December 2024 timetable change, the following services call at Forch:

- Zurich S-Bahn:
  - S18: service every fifteen minutes to Zürich Stadelhofen FB half-hourly service to Esslingen.
- Nighttime S-Bahn (only during weekends):
  - SN18: hourly service between Zürich Stadelhofen FB and Egg.

== See also ==
- Rail transport in Switzerland
