= Esslingen railway station =

Railway station in Switzerland

Esslingen
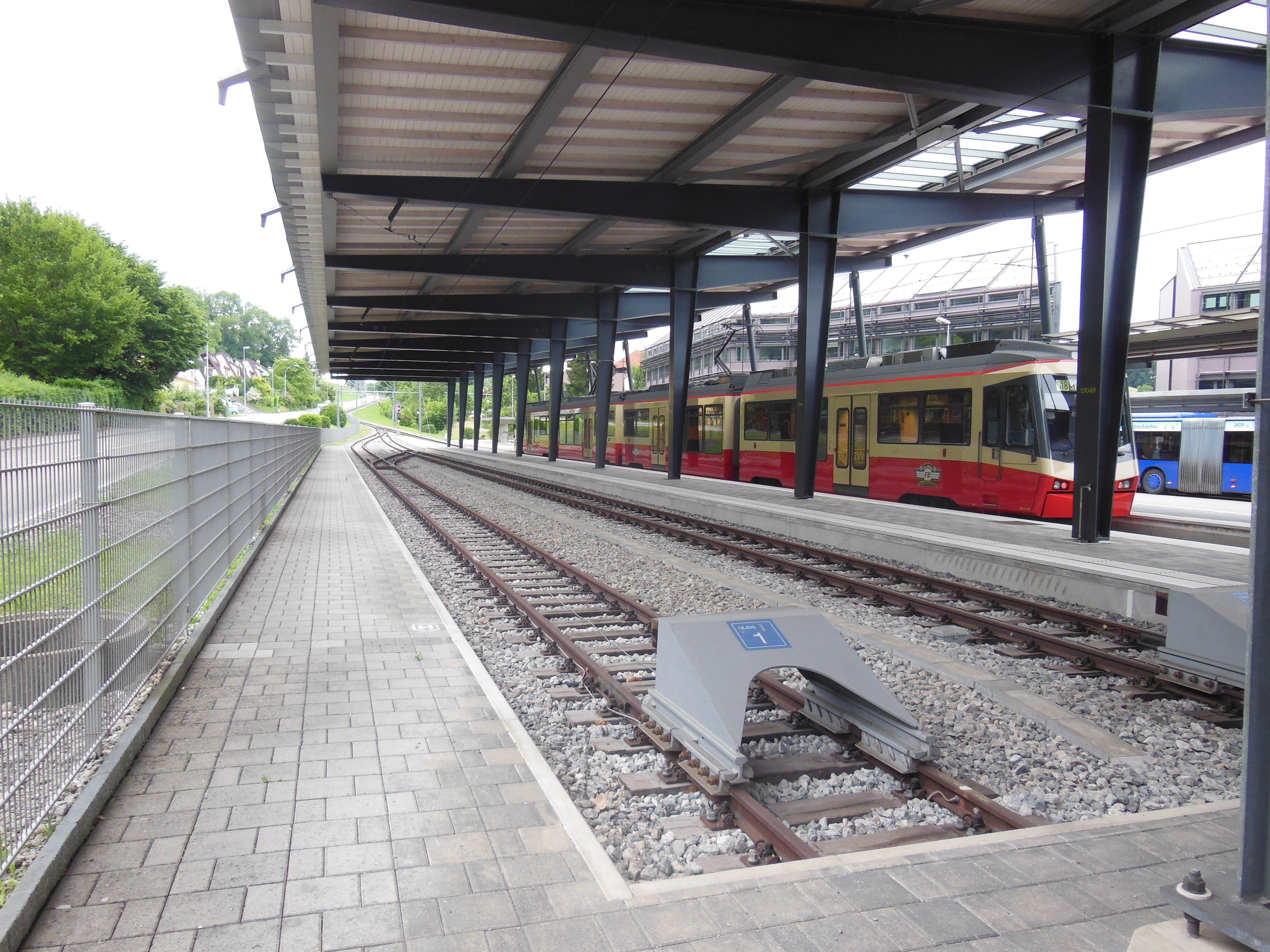
- The station, looking towards Zürich

General information
- Location: Esslingen, Egg, Zurich; Switzerland
- Coordinates: 47.28776°N 8.70990°E
- Owner: Forchbahn
- Operator: Forchbahn
- Line: Forchbahn
- Connections
- Bus: VZO bus route 842

Other information
- Fare zone: 142 (ZVV)

Services
Preceding station	Zurich S-Bahn	Following station
Emmat towards Zürich Stadelhofen FB	S18	Terminus
Location
- Location within Switzerland Location within Canton of Zurich

Esslingen is a railway station in the Swiss canton of Zurich and the municipality of Egg, servig the village of Esslingen. It is the outer terminus of the Forch Railway (Forchbahn, FB) from the city of Zurich, which is operated as Zurich S-Bahn service S18. The station is operated by the Forchbahn, and has three terminal platforms and a bus interchange located under an overall roof. It lies within fare zone 142 of the Zürcher Verkehrsverbund (ZVV).

== History ==
The Forchbahn was originally opened as a roadside electric tramway, and has been progressively upgraded into a modern electric railway. Between the Forchbahn's opening in 1912 and 1949, it connected at Esslingen with the Uster–Oetwil tramway (UOeB), another similar roadside tramway that closed in 1949. The stop both lines shared was situated to the east of the existing station near the junction of Löwenstrasse and Usterstrasse, and is still marked by the presence of the Restaurant Bahnhof. The line's terminus was relocated to its current site in 1995.

== Services ==
The station is served by Zurich S-Bahn line S18, which operates between Zurich and Esslingen. As of the December 2023 timetable change, the following services call at Esslingen:

- Zurich S-Bahn S18: half-hourly service to Zürich Stadelhofen FB

The station provides interchange with buses on route 842 of the Verkehrsbetriebe Zürichsee und Oberland (VZO), which links Uster and Oetwil am See and replaces the UOeB.

== See also ==
- Rail transport in Switzerland
