= Escher Wyss =

Area in Zurich, Switzerland

Coordinates: 47°23′27″N 8°31′21″E

- Quarter of Zurich
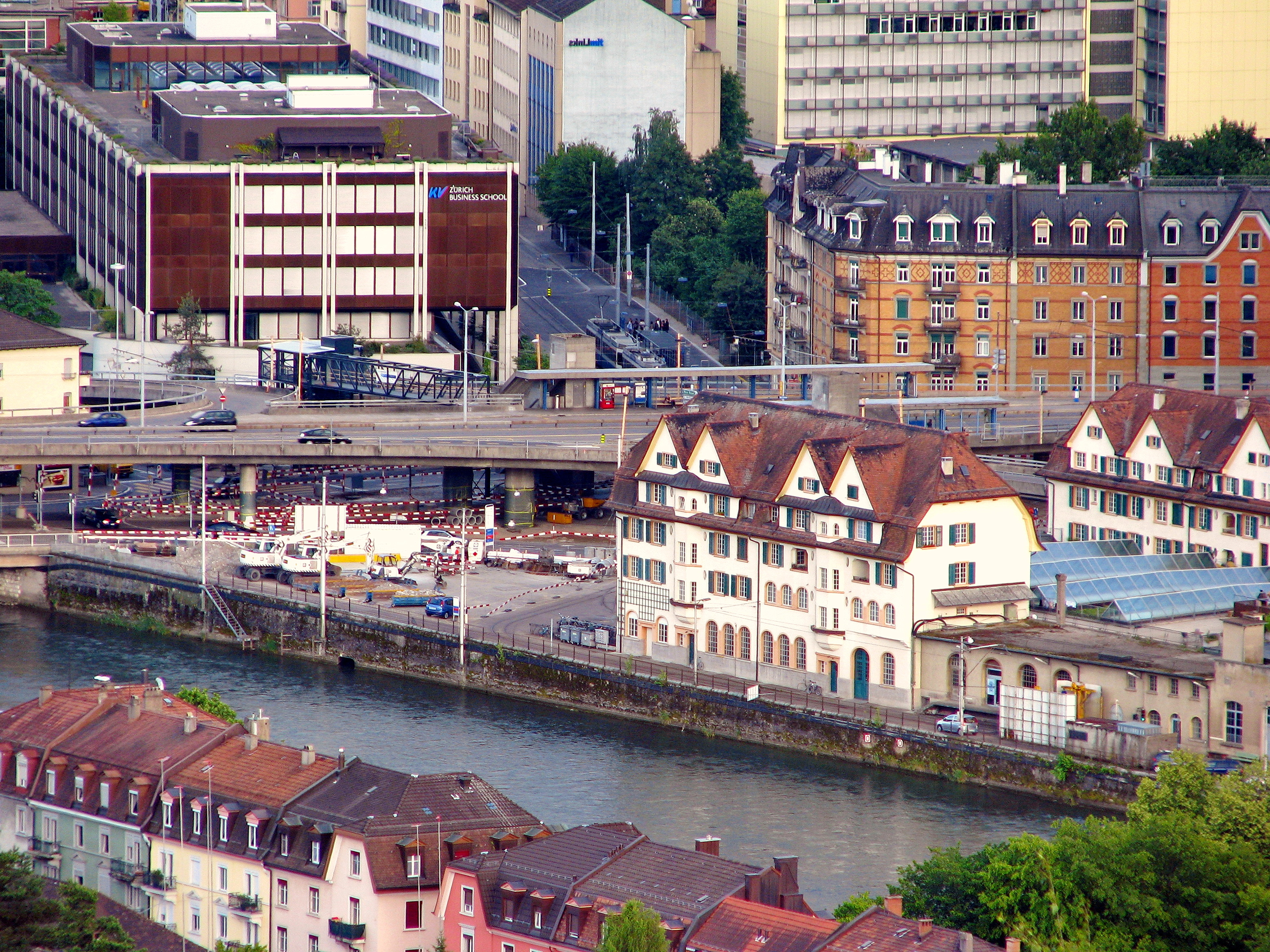
- Escher-Wyss-Platz as seen from Käferberg-Waidberg

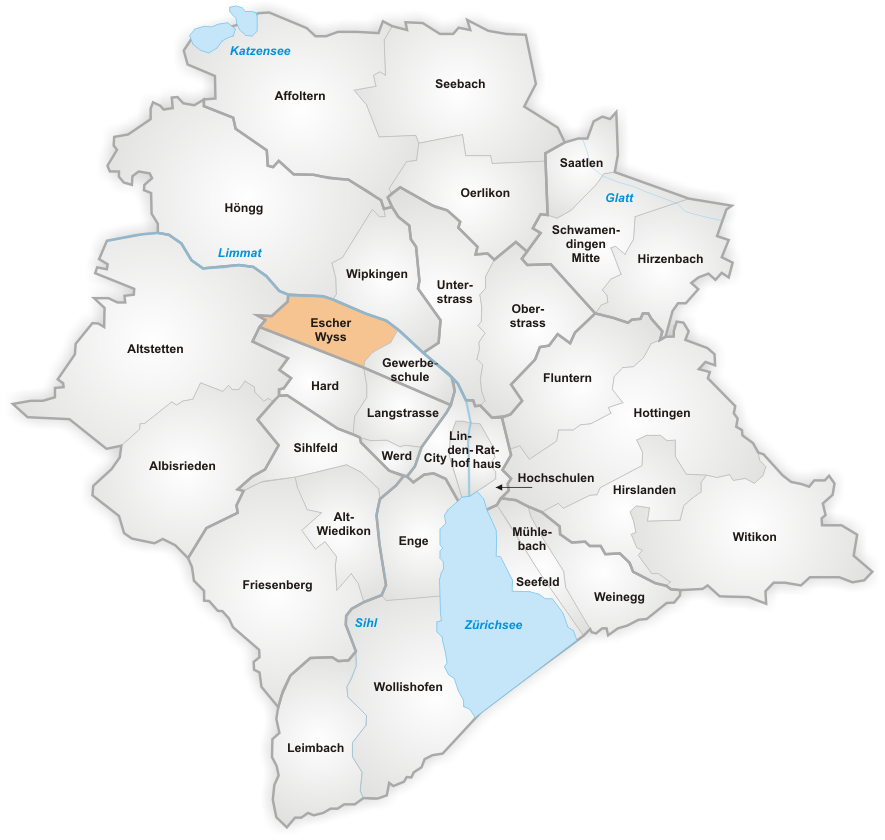
- The quarter of Escher Wyss in Zürich
- Country: Switzerland
- Canton: Zurich
- Municipality: Zurich
- District: Industriequartier

Escher Wyss is a quarter in the district 5 of Zürich, centered on the Escher-Wyss-Platz square.

Escher Wyss was formerly a part of Aussersihl municipality, which was incorporated into Zürich in 1893.

The quarter has a population of 2,727 distributed on an area of 1.27 km^{2} (1/2 sq. mile). It takes its name from the company Escher Wyss & Cie. that was formerly based in the area. The company's former Schiffbau, or shipbuilding hall, is now a theatre venue operated by the Schauspielhaus Zürich.

The Technopark Zürich site was built between 1989 and 1993 as the first large single building on the industrial site of the former Escher Wyss & Cie company, and triggered the overall planning of the 17-hectare site.

The quarter is served by Zürich tram lines 4, 8, 13 and 17 (temporarily lines 8, 17, 50 and 51 from December 2025 until December 2026), all of which link Escher-Wyss-Platz to central Zürich. The Zürich trolleybus routes 33 and 72 pass through the quarter on the Hardbrücke elevated roadway, serving stops above Escher-Wyss-Platz.
