= Hardbrücke =

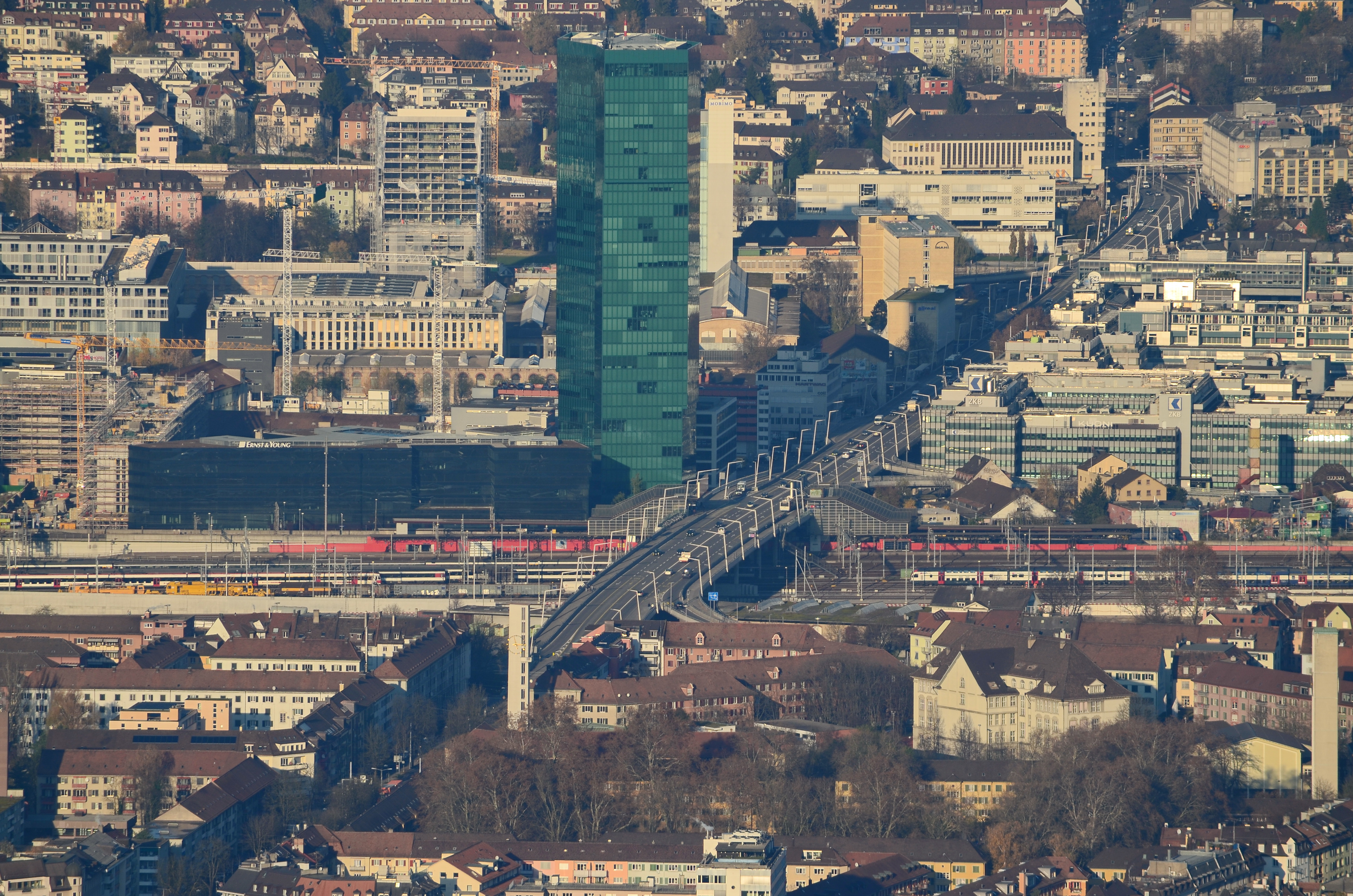
- Hardbrücke, Hardbrücke railway station, and Prime Tower
- Coordinates: 47.38514°N 8.51717°E
- Crosses: River Limmat; Zürich–Baden railway line and Zurich–Winterthur railway line (Käferberg Tunnel variant); Various streets
- Locale: City of Zürich, Canton of Zürich, Switzerland
- Preceded by: Hardbrücke truss bridge

Characteristics
- Design: Girder bridge
- Material: Concrete
- Total length: 1,350 m (4,430 ft)
- Width: 17.5 m (57 ft) to 28.4 m (93 ft)

History
- Construction start: 1969
- Opened: 1972

Statistics
- Daily traffic: 70,000 (2009)

The Hardbrücke (Swiss German: Hardbrugg) is a 1,350 metres (4,430 ft) long road bridge and important north–south connection in the Swiss city of Zürich. As of 2009, 70,000 vehicles use the bridge daily.

From north to south, the bridge crosses Wipkingerplatz in the Wipkingen quarter, the River Limmat, a couple of roads of the Industriequartier (including Escher-Wyss-Platz), the railway tracks of the Zürich–Baden and Käferberg lines (including a railway station), numerous holding tracks of the track field preceding Zürich HB, the former goods station (mostly removed) and a road (Hohlstrasse) in Zürich's District 4. Over the Limmat, the Hardbrücke forms an upper level to the lower level Wipkingerbrücke, a road/tramway bridge.

There are several exit and entrance ramps that link the bridge to the streets below. Some junctions on the bridge have traffic lights.

== Name ==
The bridge (German: Brücke) gets its name from the German toponym (Flurname) Hard, meaning hill or forest, used for the area where the bridge is located.

Hard is part of the name of several nearby places, such as Hardplatz, Hardturm, Hardau, Herdernstrasse (plural of Hard), or the Hard quarter.

== History ==
The first Hardbrücke, a truss bridge linking Hardplatz with Pfingstweidstrasse, was built in 1897.

Construction of the current girder bridge commenced in 1969 and it was opened in 1972. It was built as a preliminary traffic solution as discussions for an expressway through Zürich's city center went on. The Y-shaped core section of this expressway (Zürcher Expressstrassen-Y) was never built. Until the opening of the Uetliberg Tunnel and the highway bypassing Zürich to the West (Westumfahrung) in 2009, all north-/south-bound through traffic took the route over the Hardbrücke. The bridge, which remains an important innercity route up to this day, underwent a major refurbishment between 2009 and 2011.

Between 2015 and 2017, tramway tracks were installed on the section crossing the railway tracks, allowing the extension of Zürich tram route 8 from Hardplatz to Hardturm on the other side of the tracks. A further, northward extension of the tramway tracks over Hardbrücke and up to Bucheggplatz and Milchbuck, which would have served two new tram routes (Rosengartentram), was rejected by a referendum in 2020.

== Railway station ==
Since 1982, there is a railway station below the Hardbrücke, which is named Zürich Hardbrücke after the bridge. The station is located on the Zürich–Baden and Zürich–Winterthur (Käferberg Tunnel variant) lines. It is served by regional trains (S-Bahn) of Zürich S-Bahn. The station is one of the busiest in the Zürich S-Bahn network. In terms of passenger numbers, it is ranked 11th in the country (as of 2018). The station can be accessed either from the bridge or via an underpass. There are stairs and elevators in both cases.

== Traffic ==
The bridge is used both by private and public transport.

Above the railway station, there is a tram and bus stop (called Bahnhof Hardbrücke) served by VBZ tram route 8, trolleybus routes 33 and 72, and bus route 83. The tram route leaves the bridge just north of the stop, while all trolleybus and bus routes continue northward on the bridge. Additional bus stops on the Hardbrücke exist at Schiffbau and Escher-Wyss-Platz.

The bridge is also a main bike route on the section crossing the railway tracks. Pedestrians and cyclists share the sidewalks on either side of the bridge, which are protected by a concrete wall from car traffic.

== Gallery ==
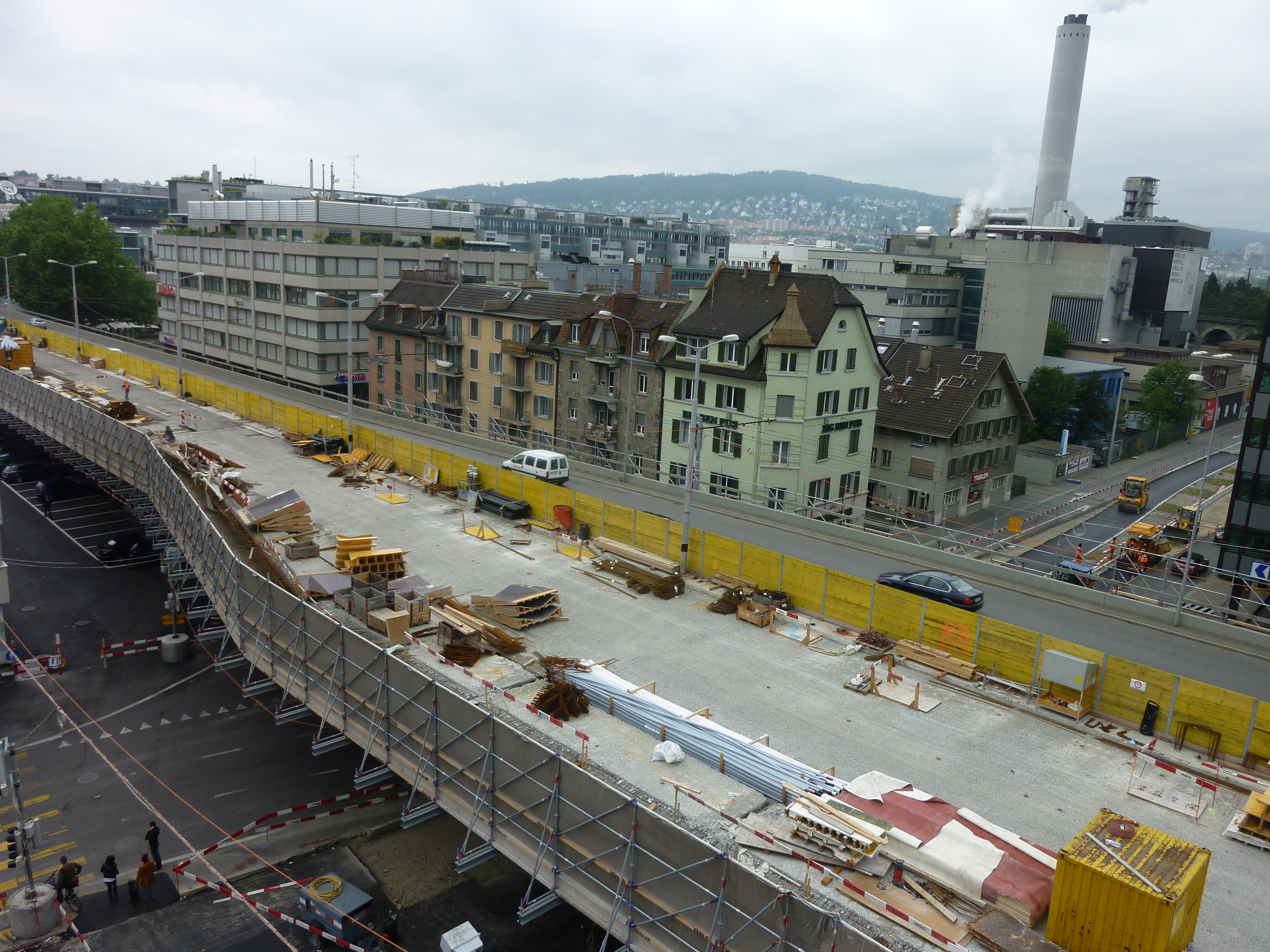
Hardbrücke during its 2010 refurbishment

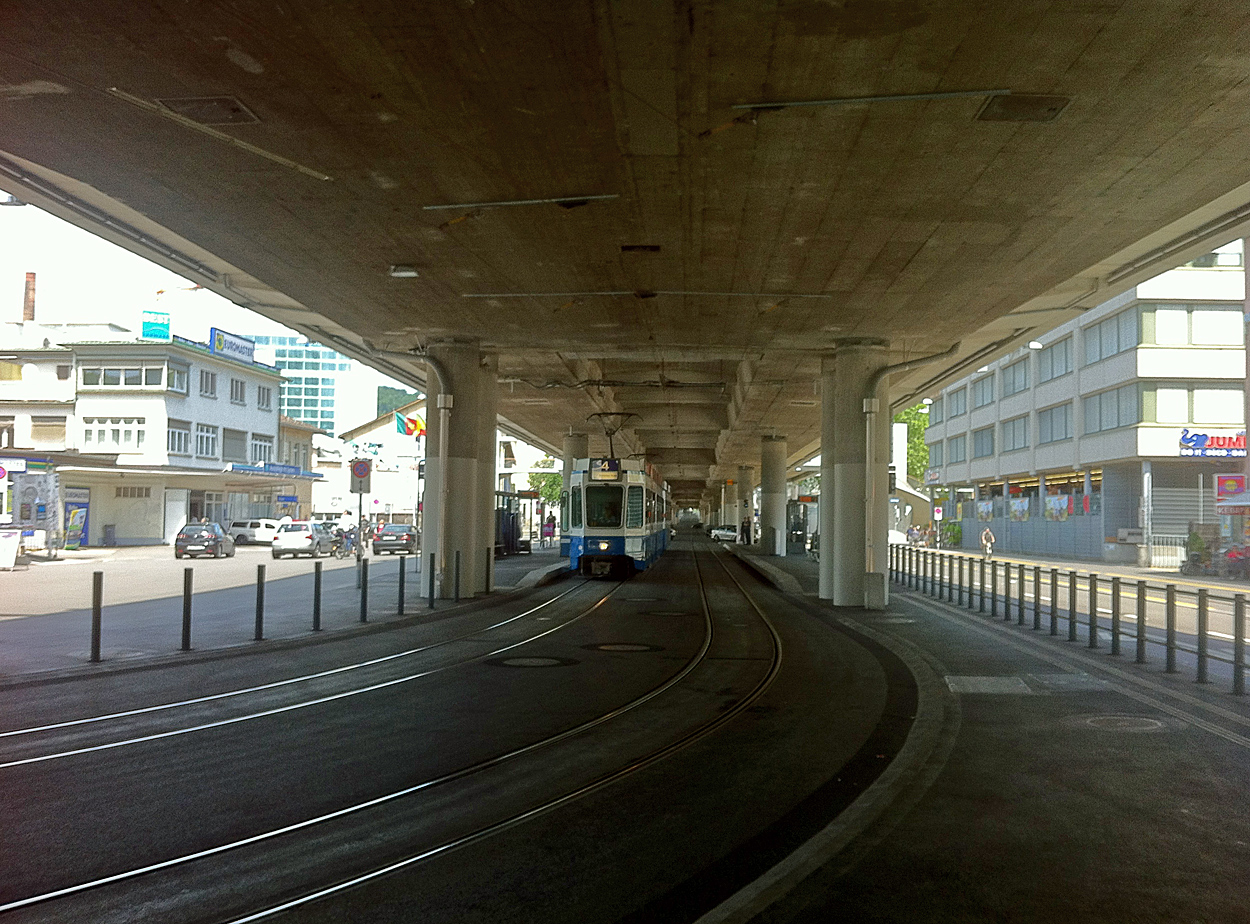
Zürich tram below Hardbrücke

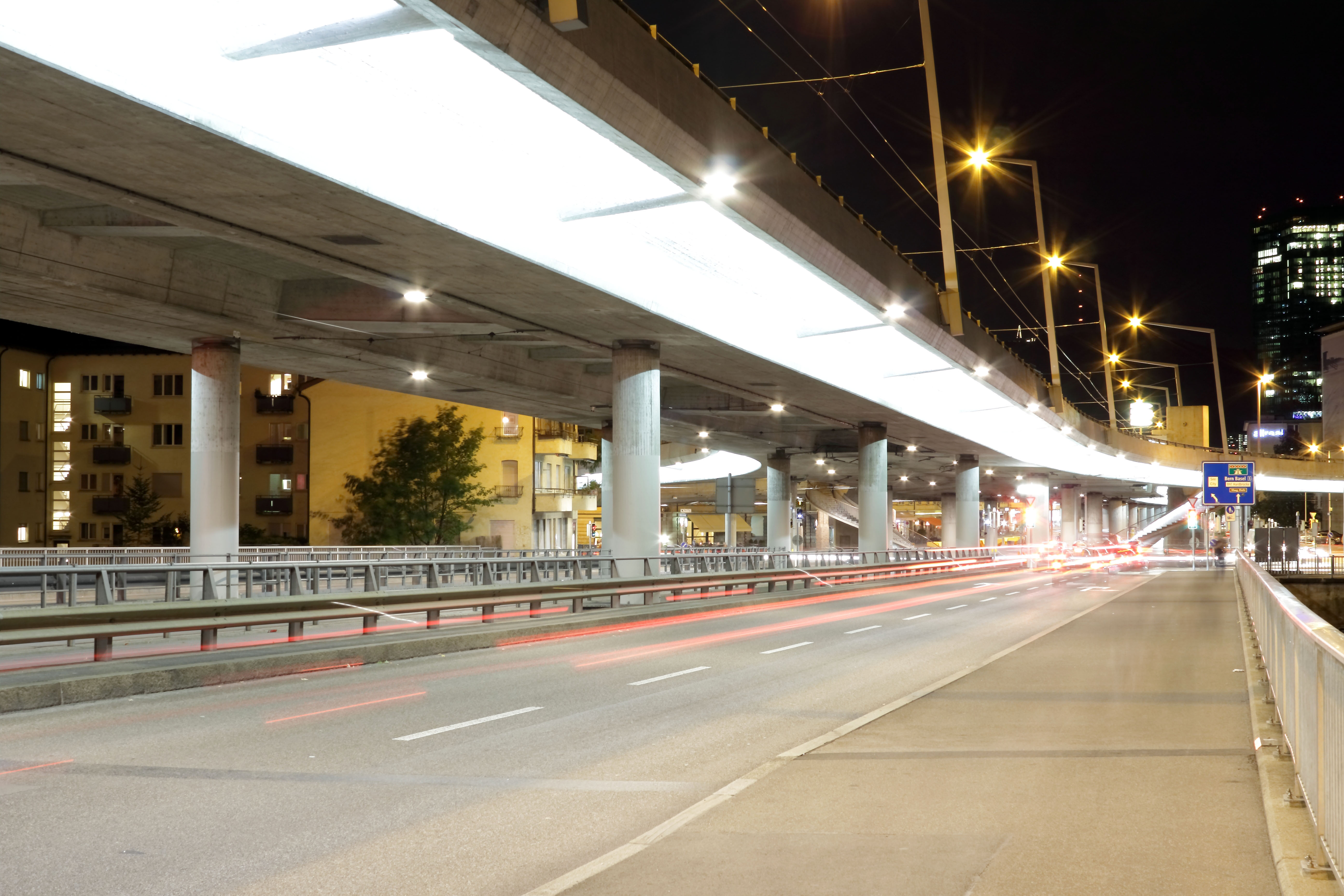
Hardbrücke (above) and Wipkingerbrücke (below) crossing the River Limmat

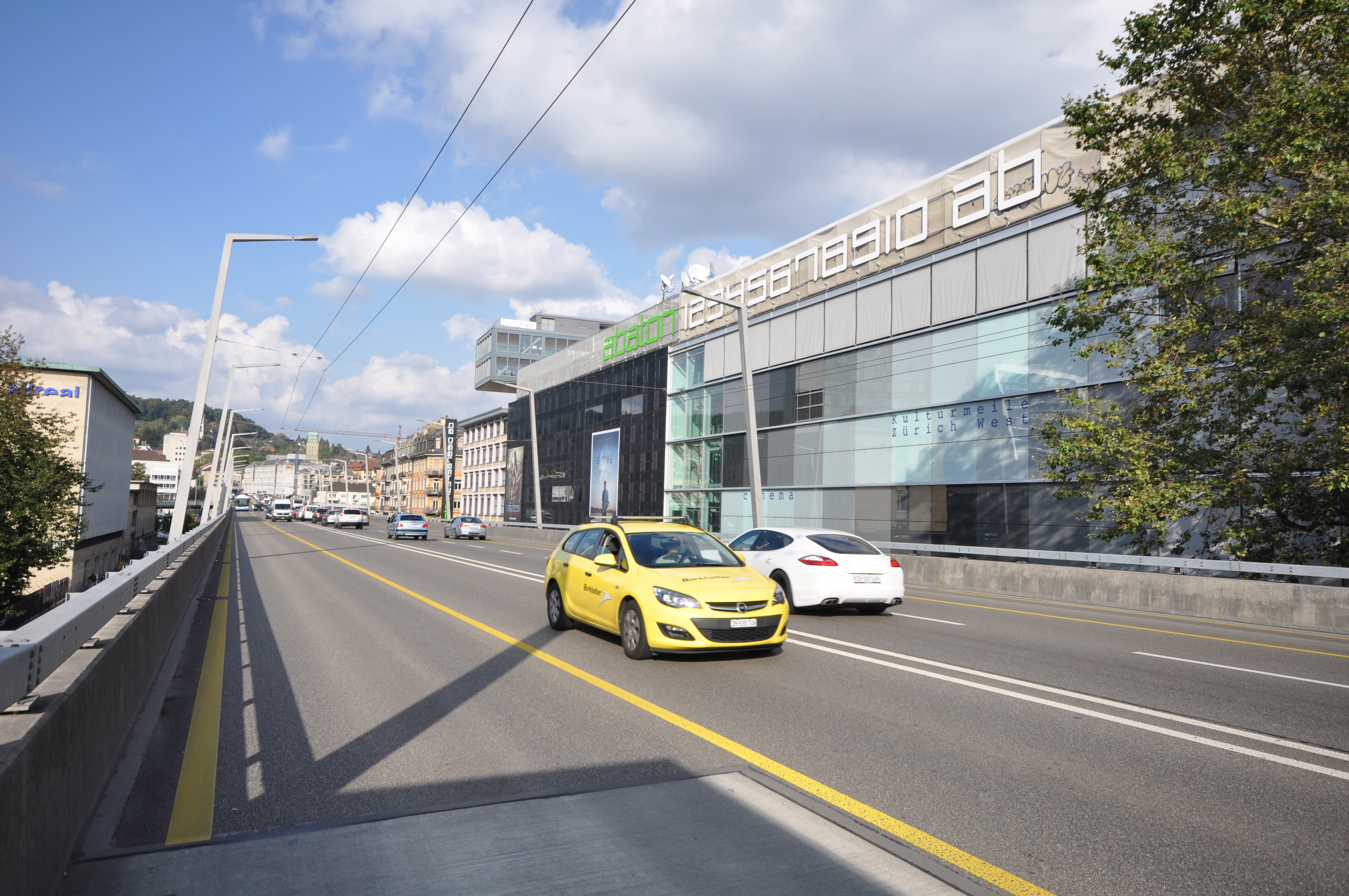
Traffic (2014)

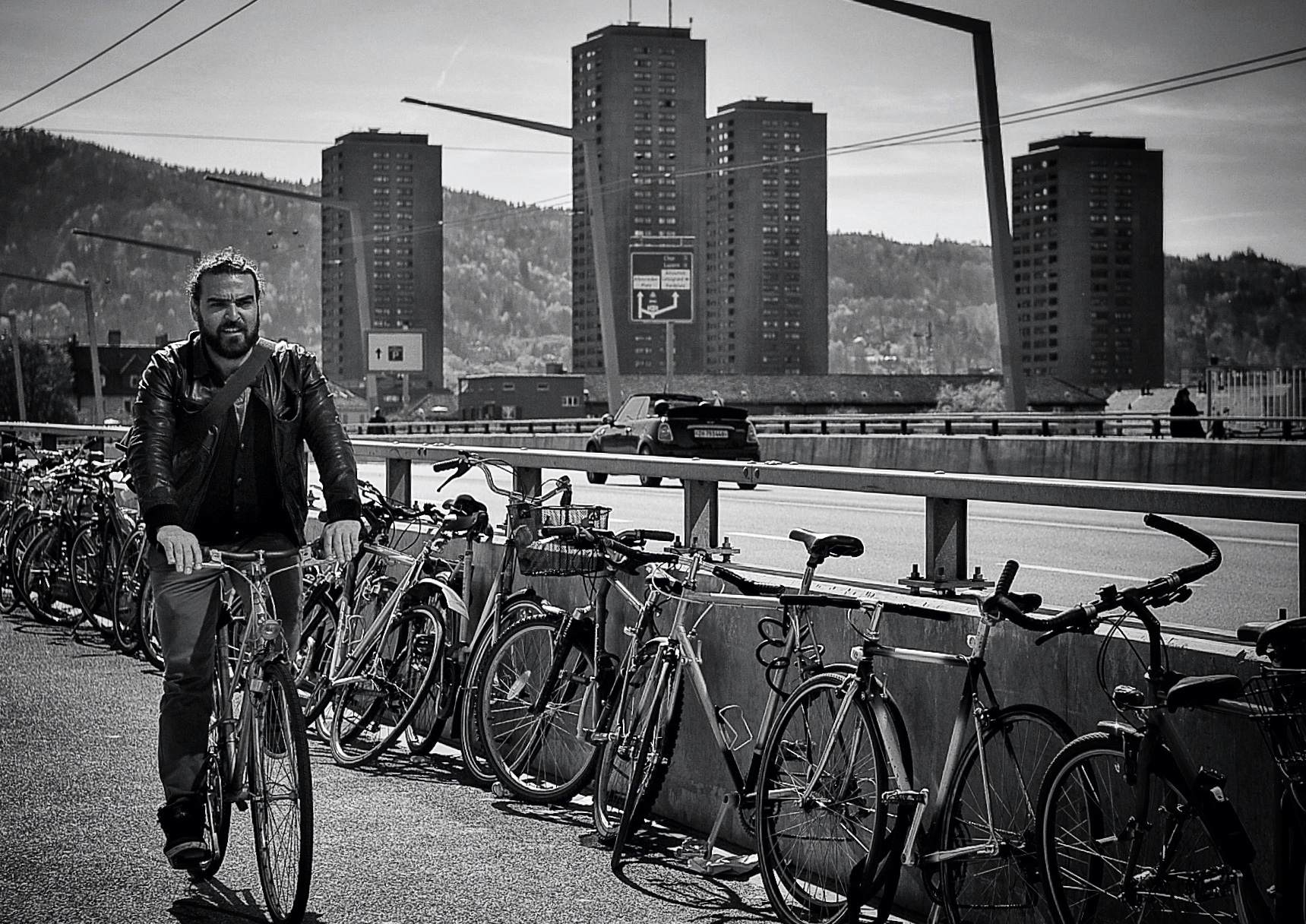
Hardbrücke is also a bike route

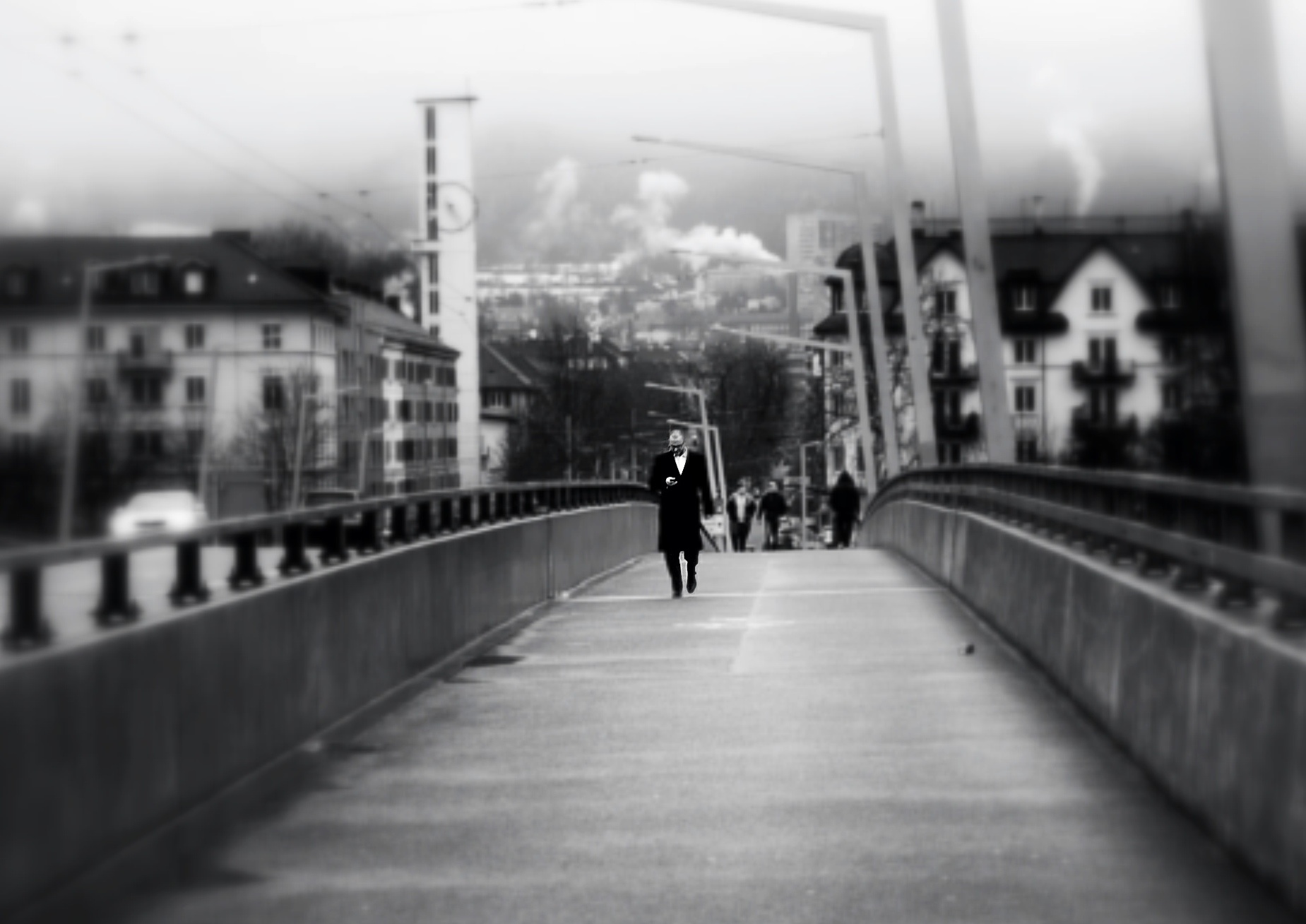
Sidewalk on the bridge

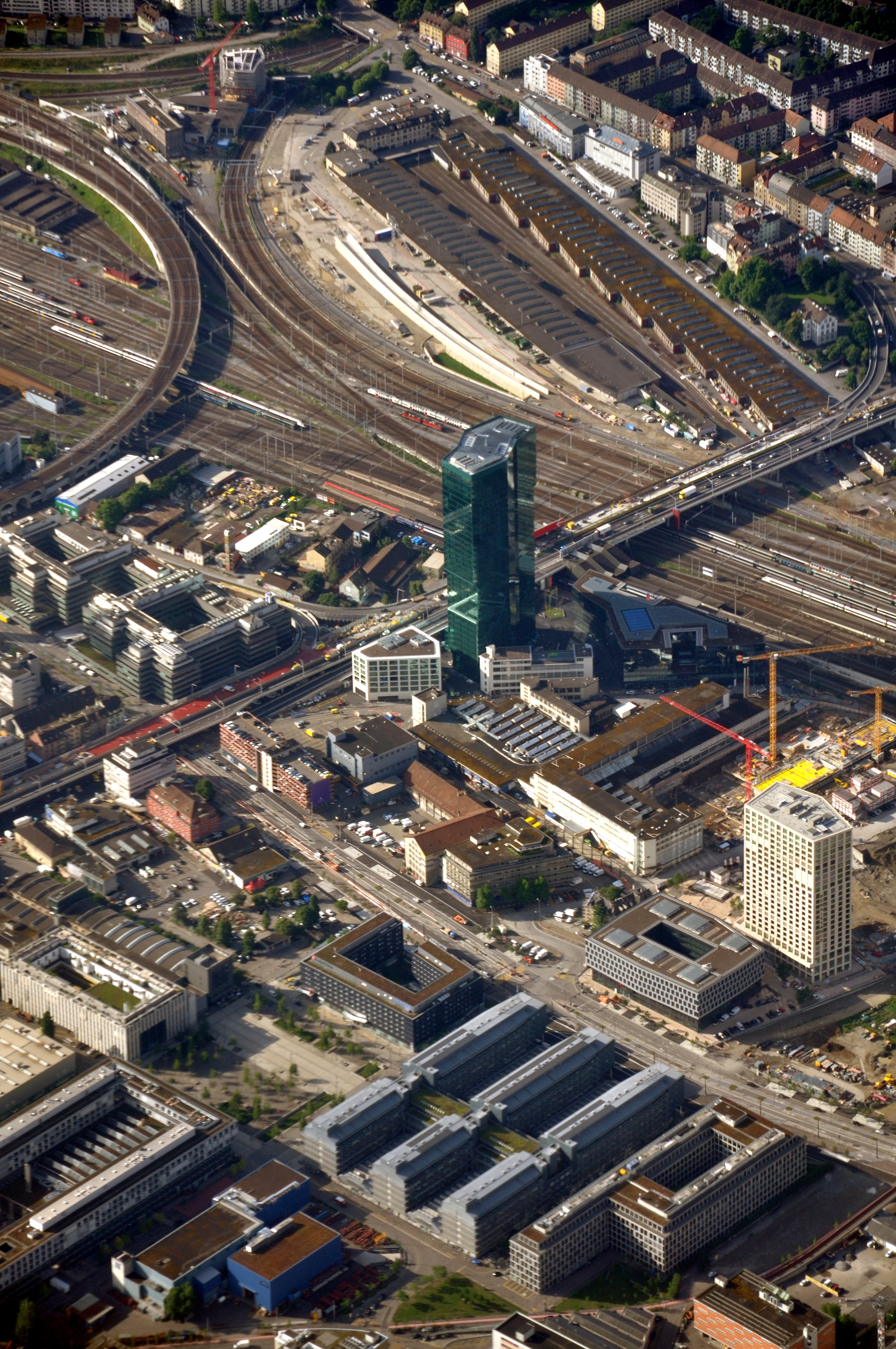
Aerial view

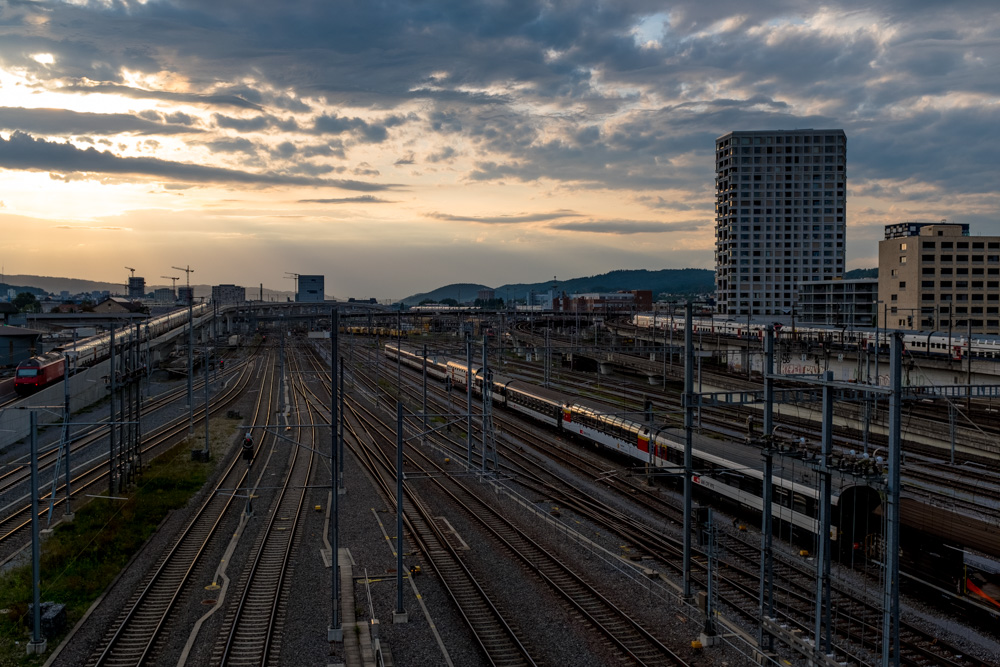
View from Hardbrücke over track field

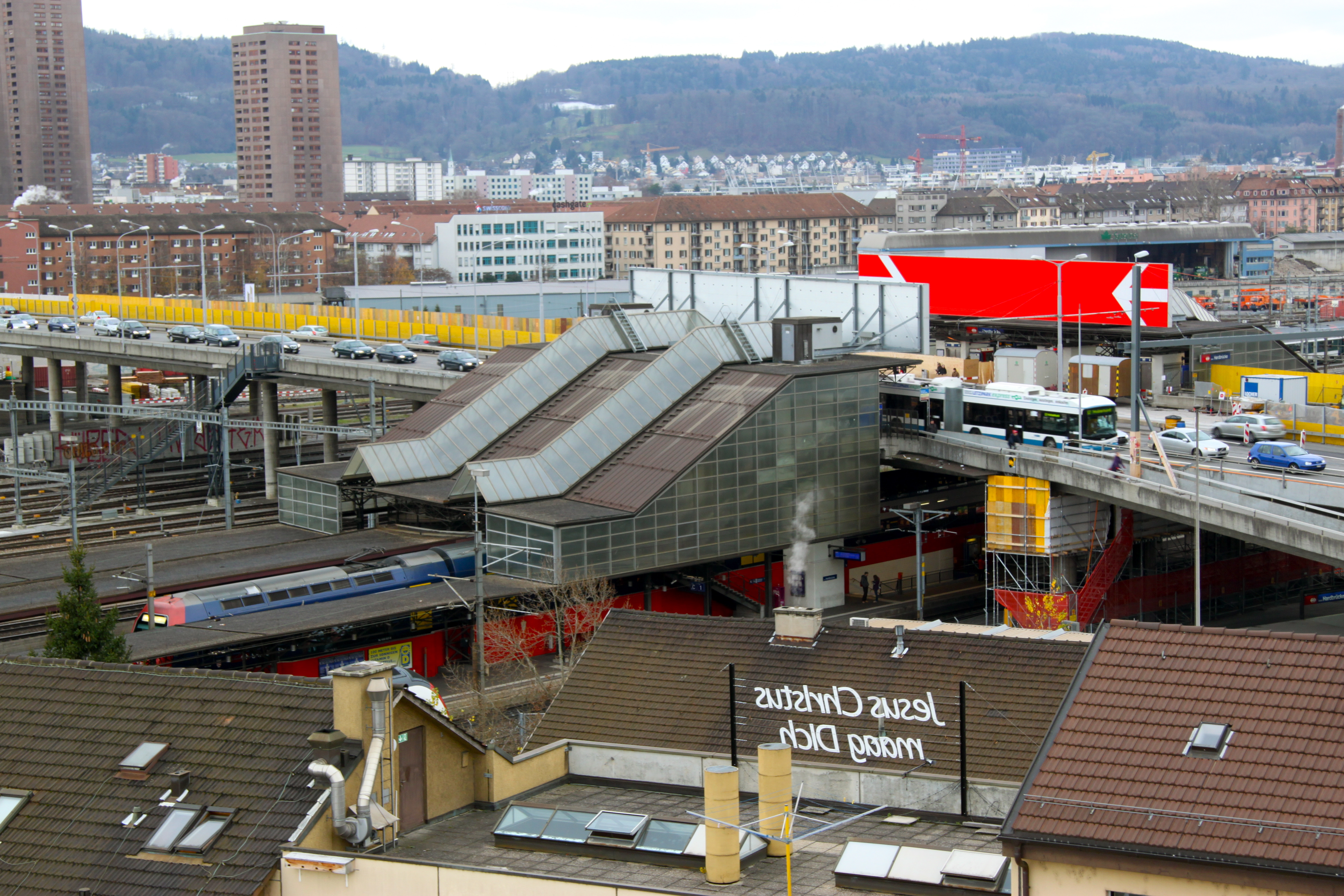
Railway station under the bridge, and tram/bus stop on the bridge

== See also ==
- List of bridges in Switzerland
