= Gewerbeschule (Zurich) =

Quarter in Zurich, Switzerland

Coordinates: 47°23′4.84″N 8°31′54.28″E

- Quarter of Zurich
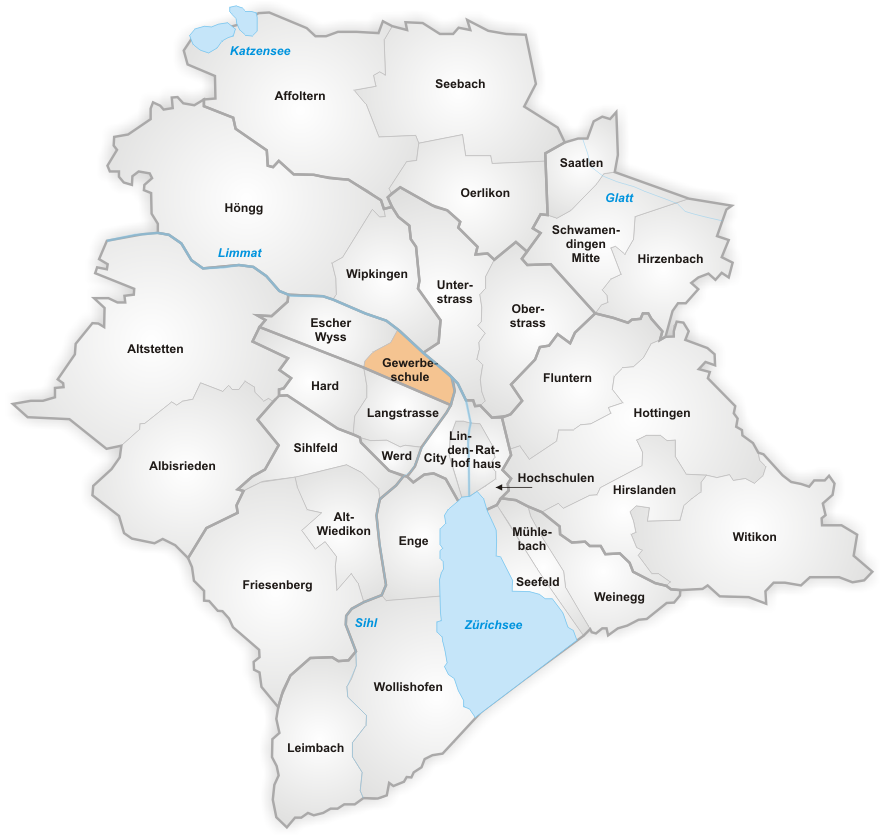
- The quarter of Gewerbeschule in Zurich
- Country: Switzerland
- Canton: Zurich
- Municipality: Zurich
- District: Industriequartier

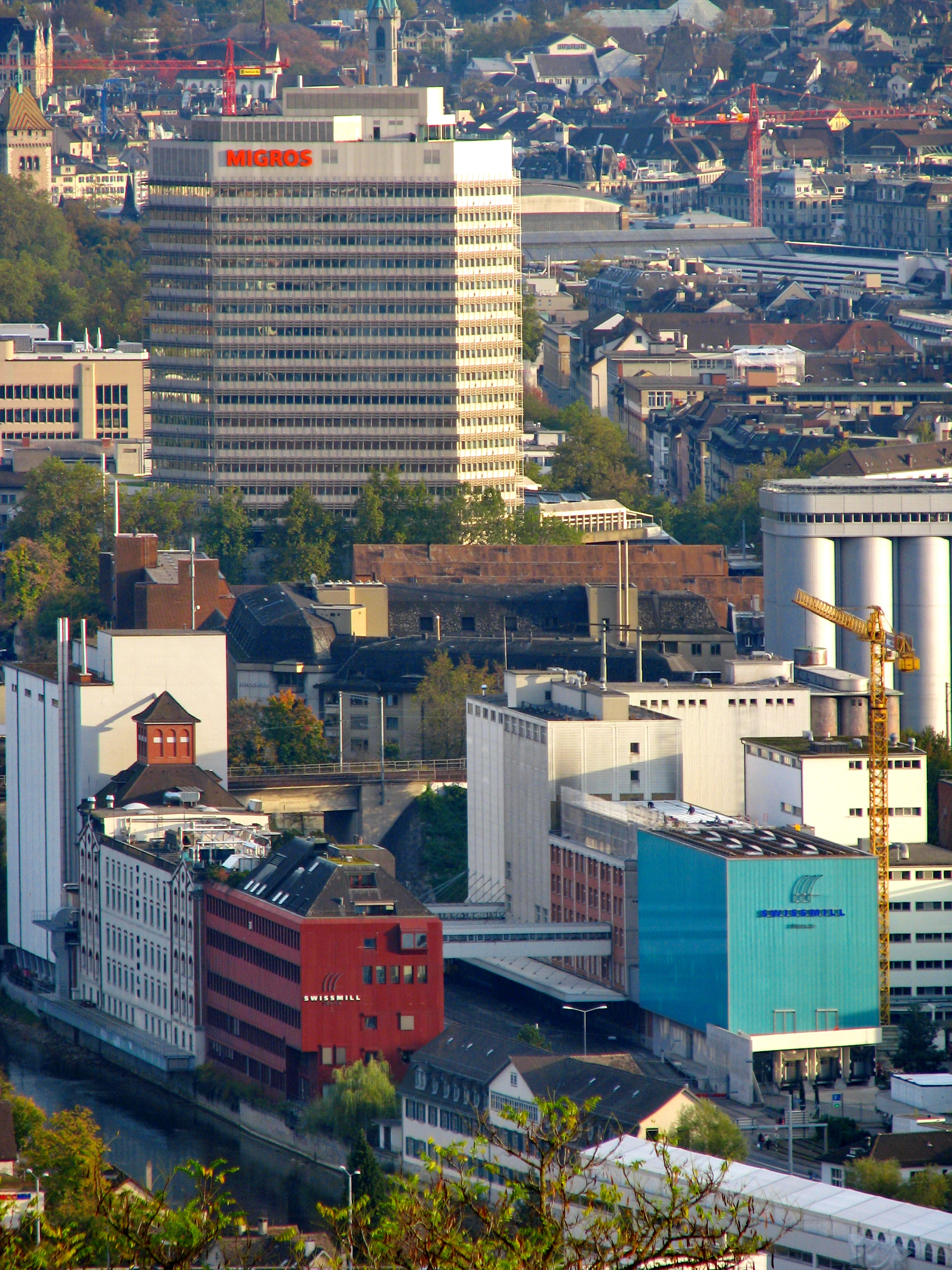
Limmatplatz with Migros building, seen from Waidberg

Gewerbeschule is a quarter in Industriequartier (District 5) in Zurich.

The district Gewerbeschule (upper district 5, there are located several Business schools) formed the formerly separate municipality of Aussersihl, which was incorporated into Zurich in 1893. The separation into the current districts 3, 4 and 5 dates to 1913. As of 2025, the quarter has a population of 9,617 distributed on an area of 0.73 km^{2} (0.28 sq mi).
