= Industriequartier (Zurich) =

Industriequartier District of the city of Zurich
- District
- Flag Seal

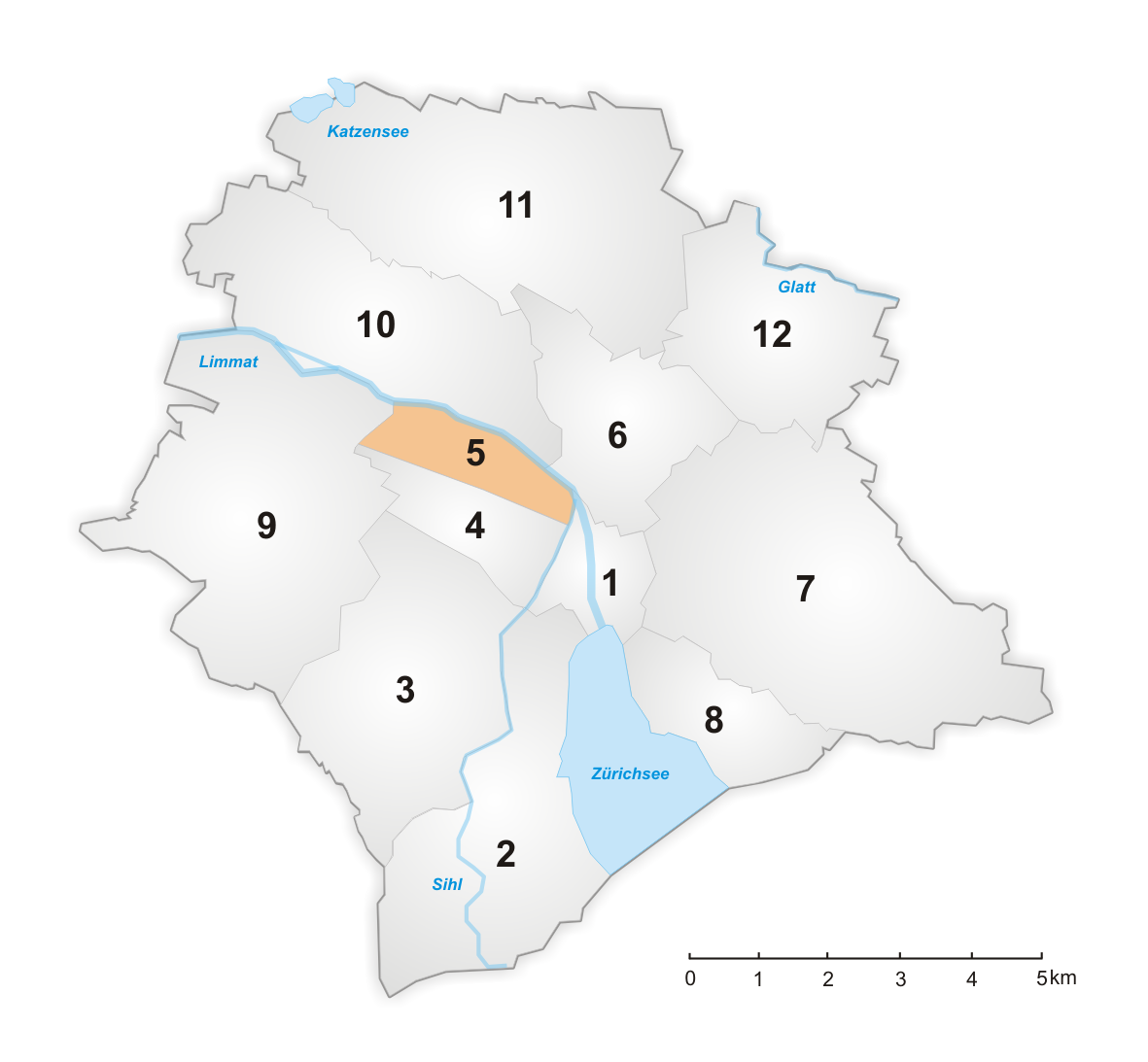
- Coordinates: 47.388°N 8.521°E
- Country: Switzerland
- Canton: Zurich
- City: Zurich

Area
  - Total: 1.99 km^{2} (0.77 sq mi)

Population (31 December 2005)
  - Total: 12,417
  - Density: 6,240/km^{2} (16,200/sq mi)
- District Number: 5
- Quarters: Gewerbeschule; Escher Wyss

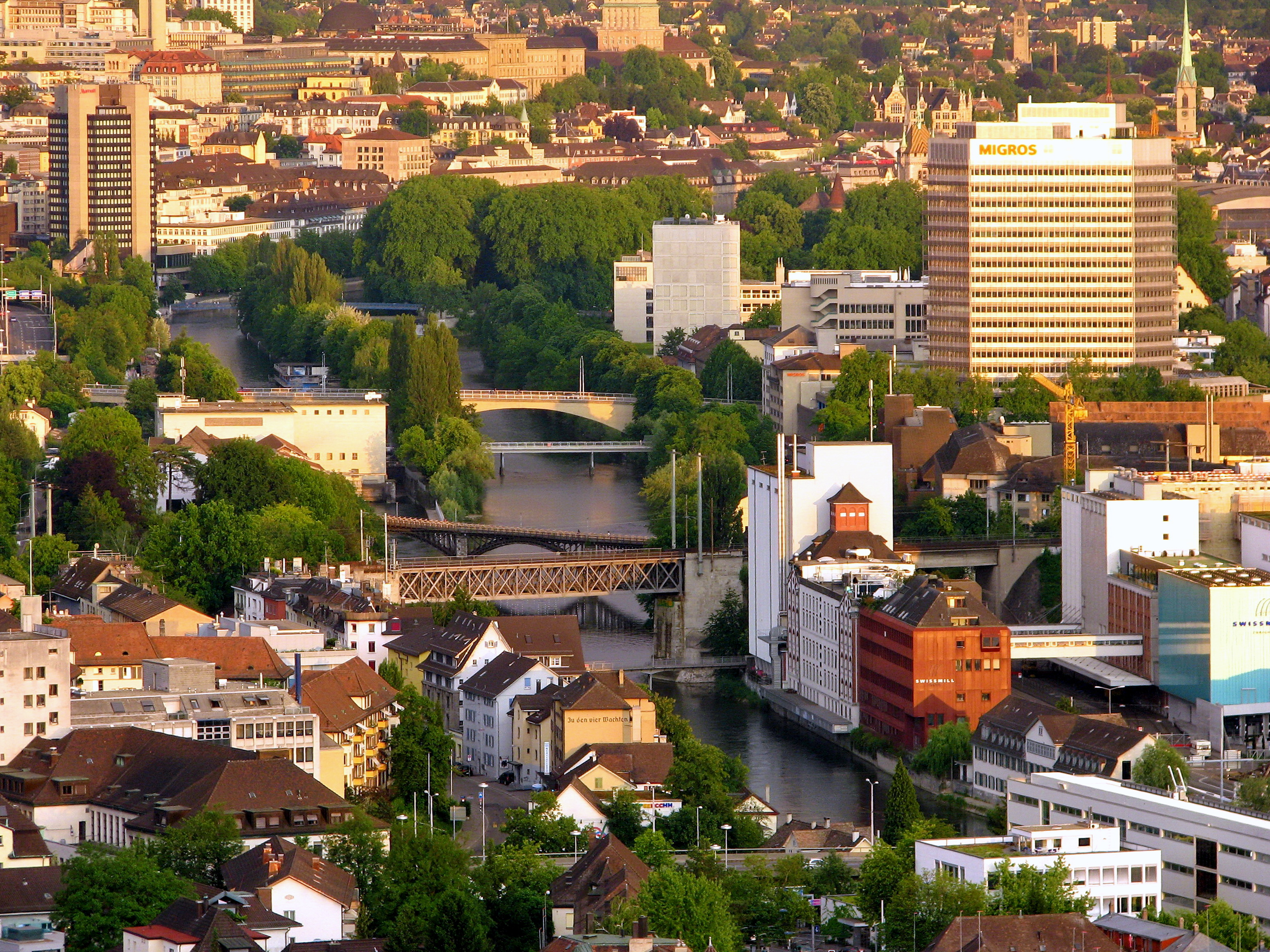
Indudstriequartier with Migros building, the Limmat and Höngg quarter to the left, as seen from the Käferberg-Waidberg

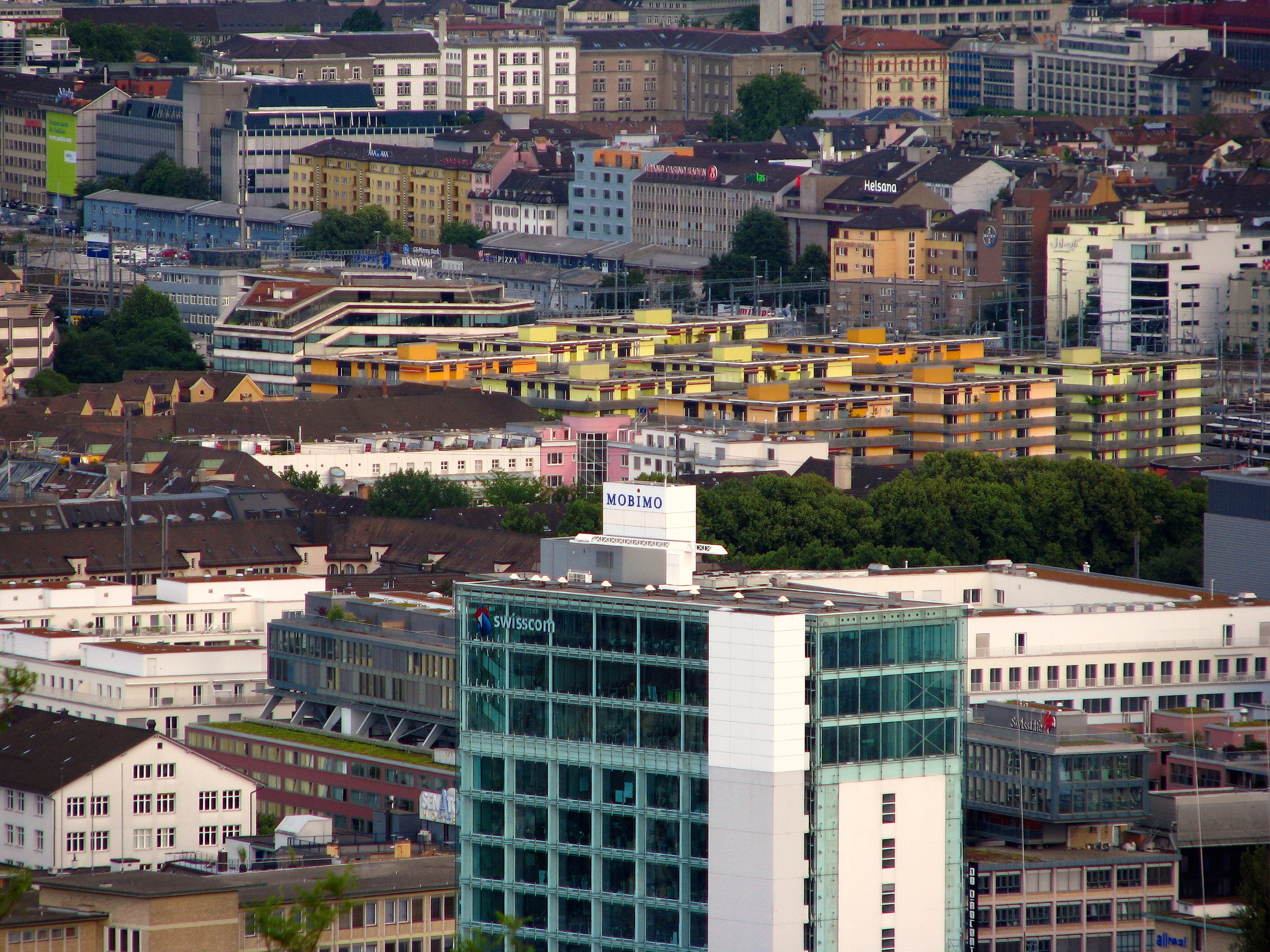
Apartment buildings near Zürich Hauptbahnhof

Industriequartier is a district in the Swiss city of Zurich.

== Geography ==
Aerial view by Walter Mittelholzer (1932)

The district comprises the quarters Gewerbeschule and Escher Wyss.

Together with today's District 4, the district formed the formerly separate municipality of Aussersihl, which was incorporated into Zürich in 1893.

== Economy ==
The Technopark Zürich site was built between 1989 and 1993 as the first large single building on the industrial site of the former Escher Wyss & Cie company, and triggered the overall planning of the 17-hectare site.

== Trivia ==
The fictitious 2007 Swiss mystery film Marmorea was filmed among others, at the Burghölzli sanatory in the Weinegg district, on the Limmat near Technopark Zürich, at the Limmatquai promenade, and on the Münsterbrücke river crossing towards Münsterhof.
