= Trolleybuses in Zurich =

Public transport system in Zurich, Switzerland

Zurich trolleybus system
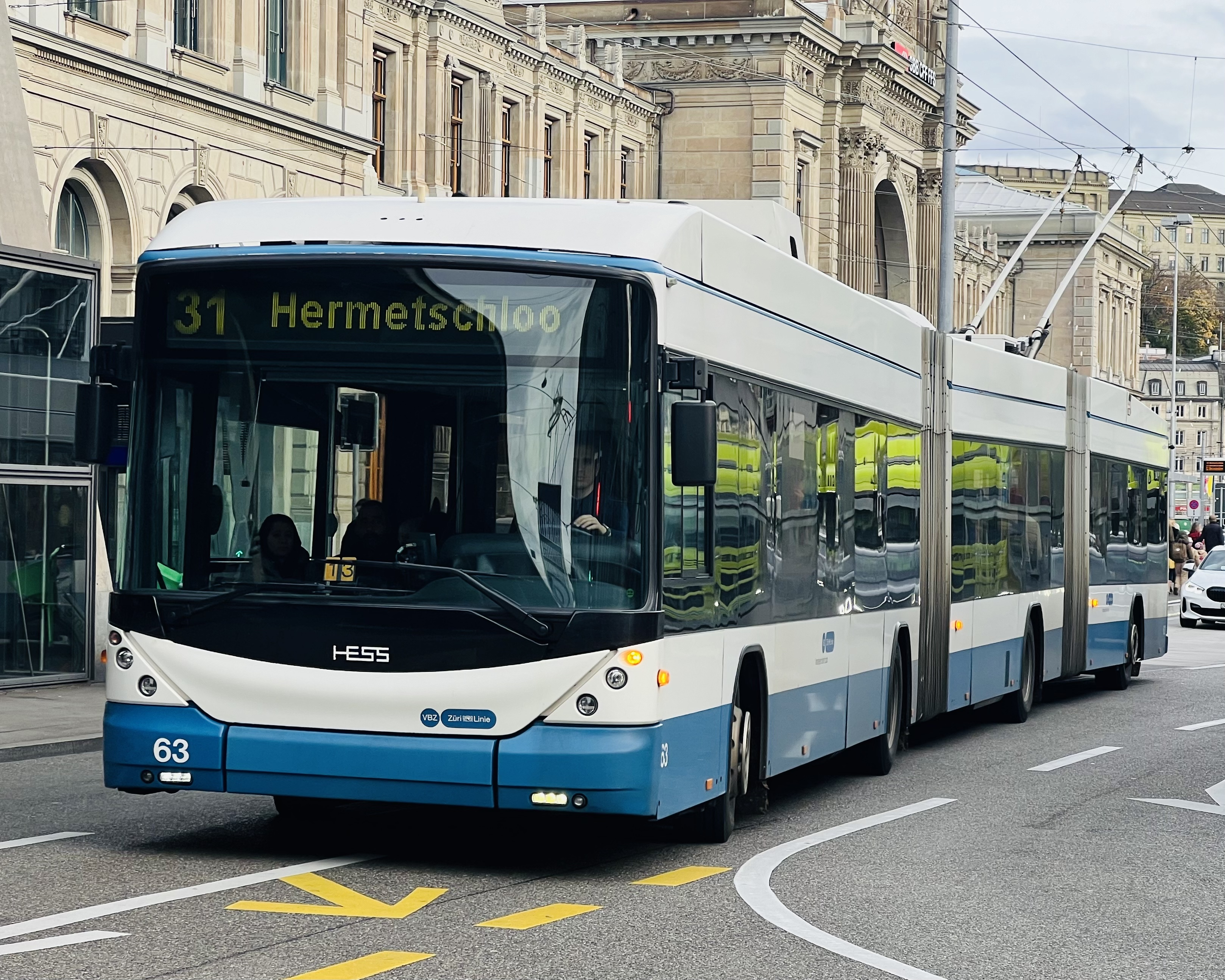
- A Hess lighTram on line 31 at Zurich HB in November 2023

Operation
- Locale: Zurich, Switzerland
- Open: 27 May 1939 (87 years ago)
- Status: Open
- Lines: 7
- Operator: Verkehrsbetriebe Zürich

Infrastructure
- Electrification: 600 V DC
- Stock: approx. 113

Statistics
- Route length: 60 km (37 mi)
- Passengers in 2025: 50.8 million
Overview
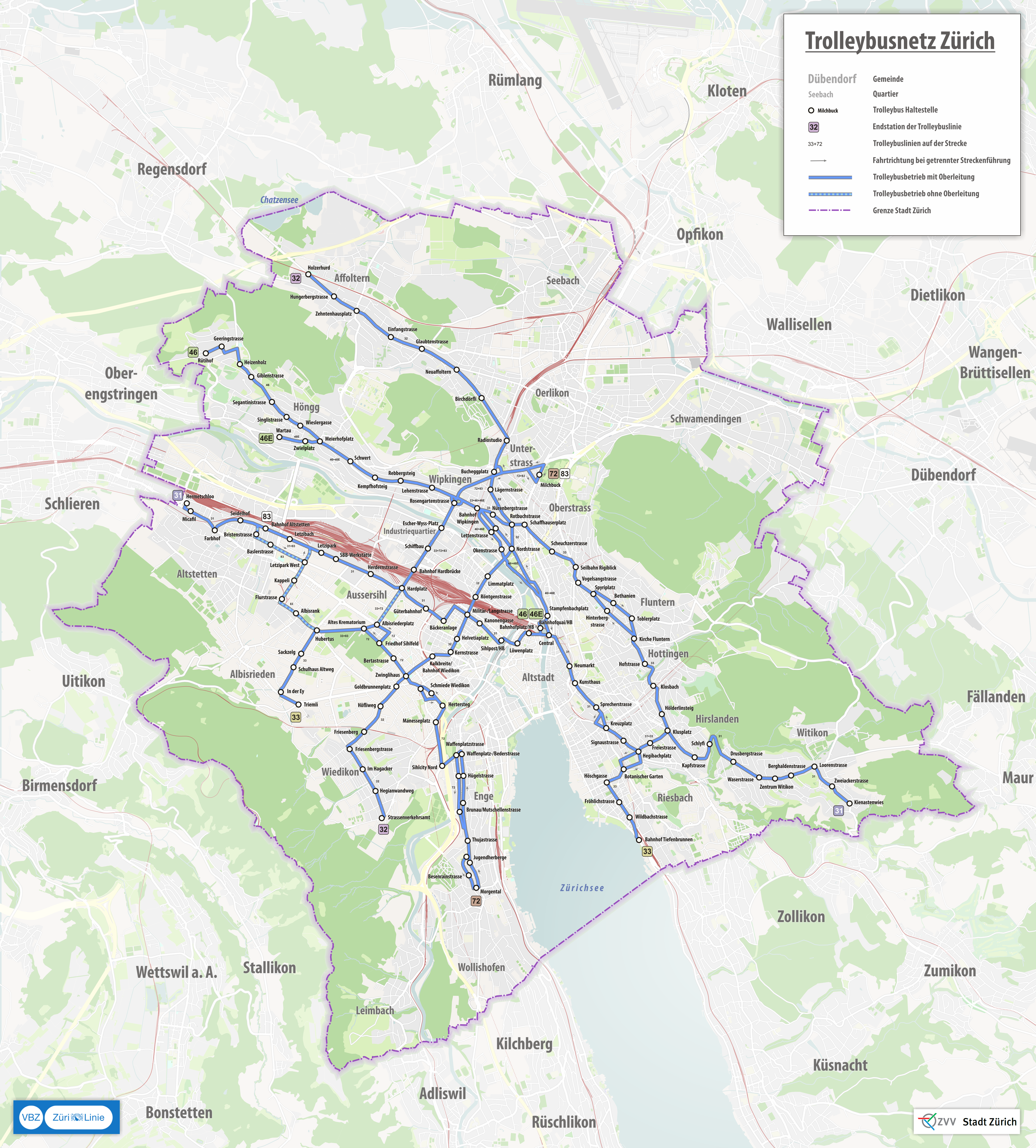
- Website: http://www.stadt-zuerich.ch/content/vbz/en/index.html Zurich Public Transport (VBZ)

The Zurich trolleybus system (German: Trolleybussystem Zürich) is part of the public transport network of Zurich, Switzerland. Opened in 1939, it integrates with the Zurich S-Bahn, the Zurich tramway network and the city's urban motorbus network to form an integrated all-four style scheme.

As of 2025, the system consisted of six lines with a total route length of 60 km (37 mi). It is operated by Verkehrsbetriebe Zürich (VBZ), which also operates the tramway and motorbus networks. Like the other modes of public transport in the region, it is covered by the Zürcher Verkehrsverbund (ZVV).

== History ==
The Zurich trolleybus system was opened on 27 May 1939, by the then Städtische Strassenbahn Zürich (Zurich Municipal Tramway) (St. St. Z.). It was the third modern trolleybus system to be opened in Switzerland, after the Lausanne system and Winterthur system, respectively. Initially, trolleybus lines were created on new routings intended to complement, rather than compete with, the city's existing tram network.

De facto, the new system's initial operator was the legally independent transport company Autobusbetrieb der Städtischen Strassenbahn Zürich (Bus Operation of the Zurich Municipal Tramway). This company had been founded in 1927 as Kraftwagenbetrieb der Städtischen Strassenbahn Zürich (Motor Vehicle Operator of the Zurich Municipal Tramway) and had been renamed in 1935. Only in March 1949 did the two companies merge, to form the Verkehrsbetriebe der Stadt Zürich (City of Zürich Transit Agency) which, since 1978, has been known as Verkehrsbetriebe Zürich.

The first Zurich trolleybus line was Bezirksgebäude to Bucheggplatz, and is now part of line 32. Between its opening in 1946 and 1956, line C, latterly known as line 34, was isolated from the rest of the system. During that period, vehicle replacement on that line was carried out using a so-called Bügelwagen on tram tracks.

In the 1950s, the city's trams began to be seen as inflexible and susceptible to the growing traffic congestion in the city streets. One proposed solution was the conversion of the less busy lines to trolleybus lines, and the first step in this direction was the conversion, between 1954 and 1958, of tram line 1, and an outer portion of tram line 2, into trolleybus line 31. However no further conversions of tram lines to trolleybuses have taken place.

Trolleybus operation on line 73 (Albisriederplatz – Morgental) was introduced in September 1974, but the route lasted only nine months as a separate trolleybus service. From 1 June 1975, it was taken over by line 33, which was extended from Albisriederplatz to Morgental on that date and reconverted to trolleybuses after having been temporarily suspended as a trolleybus route several years earlier, in 1967, because of major construction on the Hardbrücke. Route 33's eastern terminus was at Toblerplatz/Kirche Fluntern.

Line 74 (Affoltern/Furttal – Bucheggplatz) was converted to trolleybuses on 2 April 1975. In December 1986, it was extended north by around 450 m (1,480 ft) from Furttal to Holzerhurd.

In 1989, plans were announced for the conversion of bus lines 46 (Hauptbahnhof – Rütihof) and 72 (Milchbuck – Triemli) to trolleybus, and construction work began in 1993. Line 72 opened as a trolleybus route on 1 September 1994, and line 46 followed on 28 May 1995.

By 1998, routes 32 and 74 were operationally linked at Bucheggplatz and running as an unadvertised through-route combination. On 30 May 1999, route 32 was extended to replace route 74, making route 32 now Holzerhurd – Bucheggplatz – Strassenverkehrsamt.

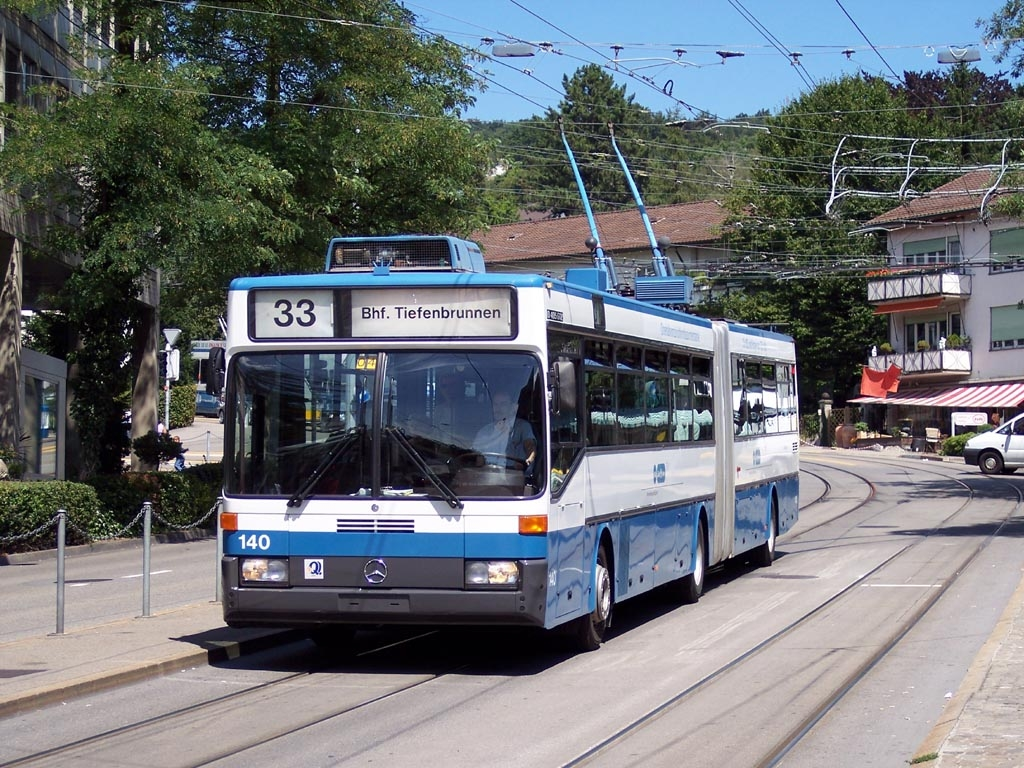
A Mercedes-Benz high-floor trolleybus on route 33 after the route's extension to Bahnhof Tiefenbrunnen

Line 33 was extended from Toblerplatz to Bahnhof Tiefenbrunnen in November 1998, bringing into use a newly constructed section of overhead wires.

With the introduction of the 2014 timetable, on 15 December 2013, lines 33 and 72 swapped their south-western termini, with the 33 running from Bahnhof Tiefenbrunnen to Triemli and the 72 running from Milchbuck to Morgental. A new trolleybus route 71 (Albisriederplatz – Rosengartenstrasse), operating in the afternoon peak period only, was introduced at that time, but was withdrawn on 13 December 2015, having last used trolleybuses on 5 October 2015.

In August 2017, trolleybus line 31 was permanently cut back from Schlieren to Altstetten (Farbhof), in preparation for the construction of the Limmattal light rail line, which ultimately opened in 2022 and replaced that former section of route 31 by an extension of tram line 2 from Farbhof to Schlieren over the tracks of the Limmattal line.

With the introduction of the 2018 timetable, line 31 was extended at its opposite end to take over the full length of trolleybus line 34, which was discontinued, thus providing a direct link between the city centre and Witikon.

Line 83 (Milchbuck – Altstetten) was converted from a bus line in 2020. It used already-existing wires on the section from Milchbuck to Hardplatz, while from Hardplatz to Altstetten the trolleybuses run on battery power, so the conversion did not require any new wires to be added. Route 31 was extended from Altstetten to Hermetschloo on 31 May 2021, using new wires.

It is planned to convert bus routes 69 (Milchbuck – ETH Hönggerberg) and 80 (Triemlispital – Bahnhof Oerlikon) to trolleybuses, with some sections to be operated on battery power, without overhead wires. Work to install overhead wires along route 69 began in October 2022. At that time, the route was projected to open as a trolleybus route in December 2023, but the schedule was subsequently postponed because of a delay in the delivery of new trolleybuses needed for it, and the route has not yet opened as of spring 2026.

== Lines ==
The present system is made up of the following six lines, with their identifying colours:

Line	Route	Minimum intervals
31	Kienastenwies – Klusplatz – Hegibachplatz – Kunsthaus – Central – Bahnhofplatz/HB – Bhf. Altstetten – Hermetschloo	7.5 minutes
32	Holzerhurd – Bucheggplatz – Limmatplatz – Helvetiaplatz – Kalkbreite/Bhf. Wiedikon – Friesenberg – Strassenverkehrsamt	6minutes
33	Triemli – Bhf. Hardbrücke – Bhf. Wipkingen – Seilbahn Rigiblick – Kirche Fluntern – Klusplatz – Hegibachplatz – Bhf. Tiefenbrunnen	7.5 minutes
46	Bahnhofquai/HB – Bhf. Wipkingen – Rütihof	3.75–5 minutes
72	Milchbuck – Bucheggplatz – Bhf. Hardbrücke – Albisriederplatz – Schmiede Wiedikon – Morgental	7.5 minutes
83	Milchbuck – Bucheggplatz – Bhf. Hardbrücke – Albisriederplatz – Bhf. Altstetten	7.5 minutes

A special feature of the system is the overhead wire crossing at Friesenberg railway station, where line 32, energised at 600 V DC, crosses the Uetlibergbahn, which has a 1,200 V DC catenary. By contrast, the proposed electrification of motorbus line 62 did not proceed, because it would have had to cross an electrified SBB-CFF-FFS railway line. An overhead wire crossing at that point, Affoltern, was not approved on safety grounds, due to the high 15 kV AC voltage of the railway line.

To this day, the trolleybus overhead wire network is closely connected to the tramway network: for example, only two rectifier stations are devoted exclusively to the trolleybus system. In some places, the return line to the rectifier is via tramway rails. Within the boundaries of the central workshop in Altstetten, there is a special trolleybus test route. This circular route is not connected to the rest of the trolleybus network.

The line 83 runs in battery mode from Hardplatz to Bhf. Altstetten. The lines 33 and 72 run in battery mode from Hardplatz to Albisriederplatz. The line 32 runs in battery mode from Bucheggplatz to Lägernstrasse.

== Fleet ==
=== History ===
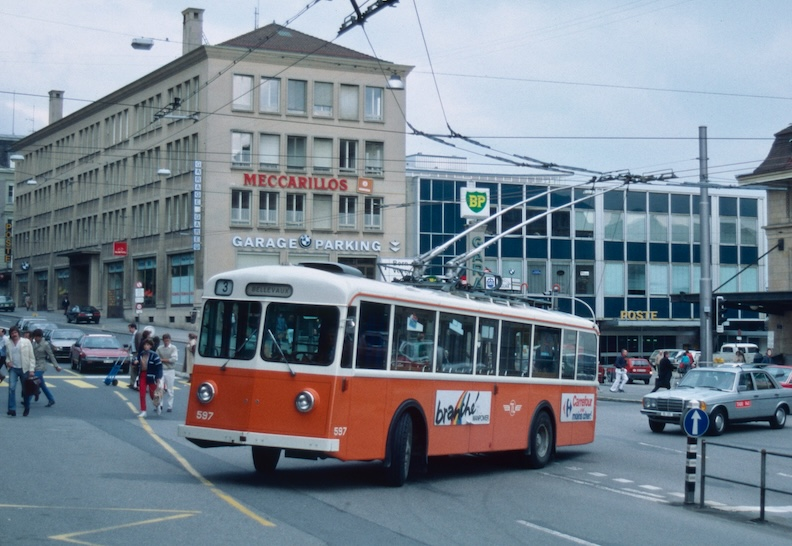
Lausanne trolleybus 597 (seen in 1985) was originally Zürich 86, until 1957.

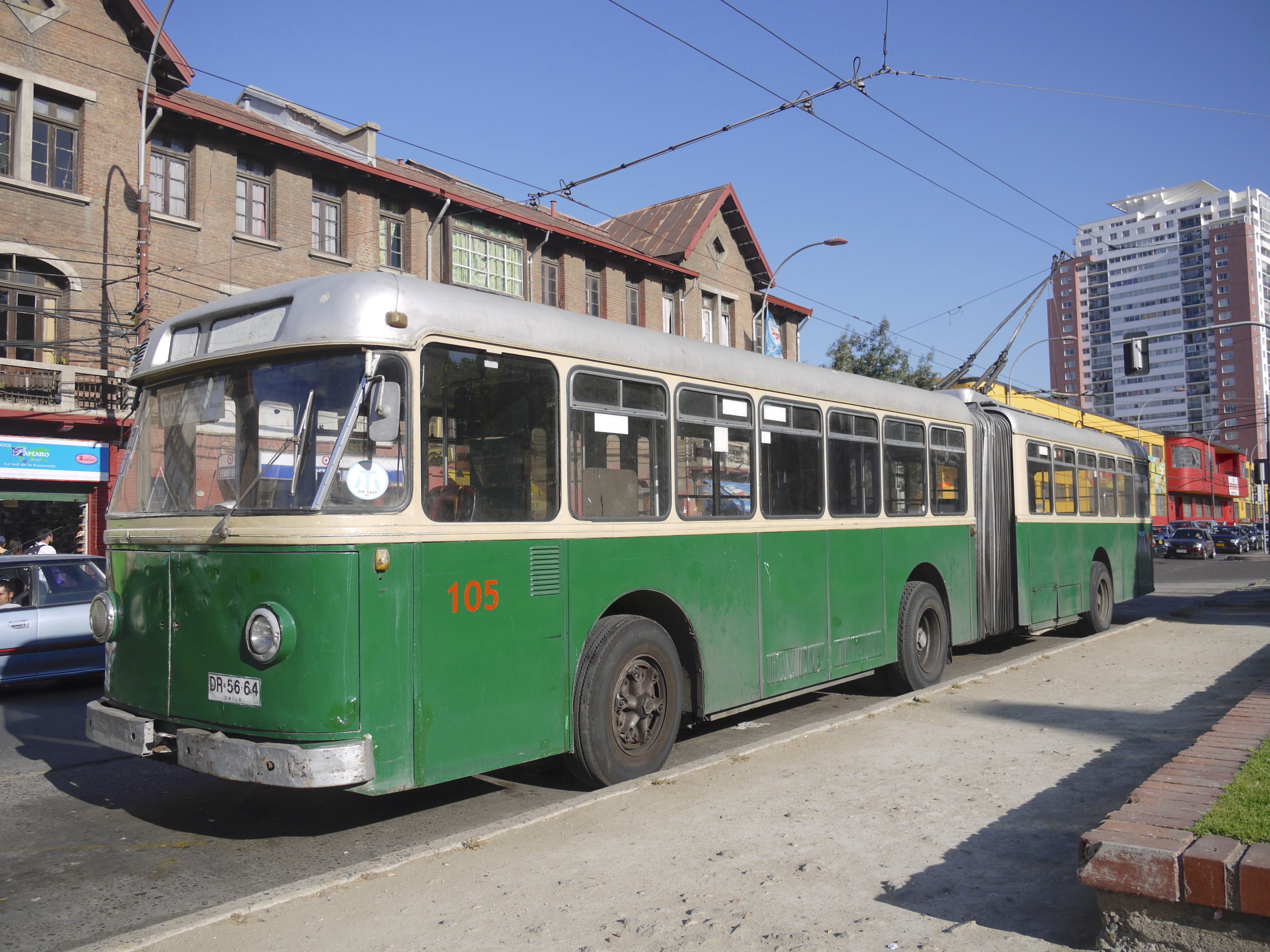
The former no. 105 (built in 1959) in Valparaíso, Chile, in 2015 – shortly before its retirement after 23 years in service there

Initially, a fleet of six rigid trolleybuses was available for use on the Zurich system. They were made by Saurer, Tüscher, FBW and SWS, carried fleet nos. 51 to 56, and differed technically or structurally from each other. By 1957, the number of rigid vehicles of various types in the fleet had increased to 57 units.

In 1957, the VBZ received its first articulated trolleybus prototype, fleet no. 101, manufactured by FBW. The VBZ's subsequent procurement of series production FBW vehicles between 1959 and 1964 included fleet nos. 102 to 133. Its second series of articulated vehicles, delivered in 1974/1975, consisted of fleet numbers 70–100, and was also manufactured by FBW.

The last two-axle trolleybuses remaining in the fleet were from a series of 12 built in 1956–1957 by FBW with bodies by SWS. By mid-1988, only four (nos. 1, 2, 8, 10) remained in service, and by 1989 the last active examples had been retired. No. 1 was preserved by VBZ.

A portion of the articulated fleet, nos. 73, 105, 107, 109, 111, 129 and 132, were sent to Chile in 1991 and 1992, after their retirement from the Zurich system. There, some of them remained in operation for more than 20 years on the Valparaíso trolleybus system. Of those articulated vehicles, the former Zurich no. 105, built in 1959, was the world's oldest articulated trolleybus of any make in regular passenger service anywhere in the world from 1997 until its retirement in May 2015.

The articulated vehicles from the 1950s were replaced about 40 years later by the first series of the Mercedes-Benz O405GTZ vehicles. These included the prototype, fleet no. 1 (built 1986), and the series production vehicles nos. 2 to 36 (model years 1988 to 1989), all of which have since been retired and replaced by low-floor vehicles.

The dual-mode bus of type O405GNTD, fleet no. 51, was a unique vehicle. The first low-floor trolleybus to operate in Zurich, it was tested on the system between October 1997 and March 1999.

An order for the system's first bi-articulated trolleybuses was placed with Hess in 2005, for 17 such vehicles and also 16 conventional, single-articulated vehicles, in Hess's "Swisstrolley" line. Before deciding to purchase bi-articulated vehicles, VBZ borrowed a bi-articulated trolleybus from the Geneva trolleybus system (no. 721), from 6 to 17 July 2004, and tested it without passengers, at night, on routes 31 and 32. In preparation for the introduction of the bi-articulated vehicles, some of the bus stops on the routes where they would be used had to be modified, as the bi-articulated vehicles are about 7 m (23 ft) longer than a conventional articulated bus. A second bi-articulated trolleybus was borrowed from Geneva, that system's no. 783 (temporarily numbered 199 by VBZ), in early 2006. It became the first bi-articulated trolleybus to operate in service in Zurich, running on route 31 between 21 January and 3 March 2006.

The first of VBZ's own bi-articulated Swisstrolleys, no. 61, was delivered on 10 January 2006, and the first conventional Swisstrolley, no. 141, was delivered on 20 July 2006. The first conventional articulated unit entered service in September 2006, while the first of the bi-articulated vehicles did not enter service until a year later, on 11 September 2007, on route 31. The last of the conventional vehicle were received by January 2008. By the end of October 2008, all 17 bi-articulated vehicles had been delivered, and all service on route 31 was using this type of vehicle.

With replacement vehicles entering service, in 2007 VBZ began to retire trolleybuses of its Mercedes-Benz O405GTZ high-floor, articulated series 1–36, and the last to be retired was no. 25 at the end of October 2009. This left around 40 similar high-floor trolleybuses in service, Mercedes-Benz O405GTZ of series 101—143.

Eighteen new single-articulated Hess trolleybuses were delivered between January 2006 and January 2007, numbered 144–161. Delivery of 12 additional new bi-articulated trolleybuses, nos. 78–89, began in August 2007, followed by two more of the same type, 90–91, in May 2014. The first three of 21 new Hess articulated trolleybuses, series 162–182, were delivered in March 2013, and the remainder arrived during the year.

The last four Mercedes-Benz O405GTZ trolleybuses, the last high-floor trolleybuses in the fleet, were retired in December 2015.

Delivery of nine new Hess articulated trolleybuses equipped with In-Motion Charging capability, nos. 200-208, began in February 2020 and was completed in March 2020. One additional unit, numbered 209, was ordered in 2021 and delivered in February 2022.

In late 2022, VBZ placed an order with Hess for another 13 single-articulated and 13 bi-articulated trolleybuses. Delivery of the former, numbered from 1, began in mid-2025, while delivery of the latter, numbered from 210, had begun a year earlier, in July 2024.

=== Current fleet ===
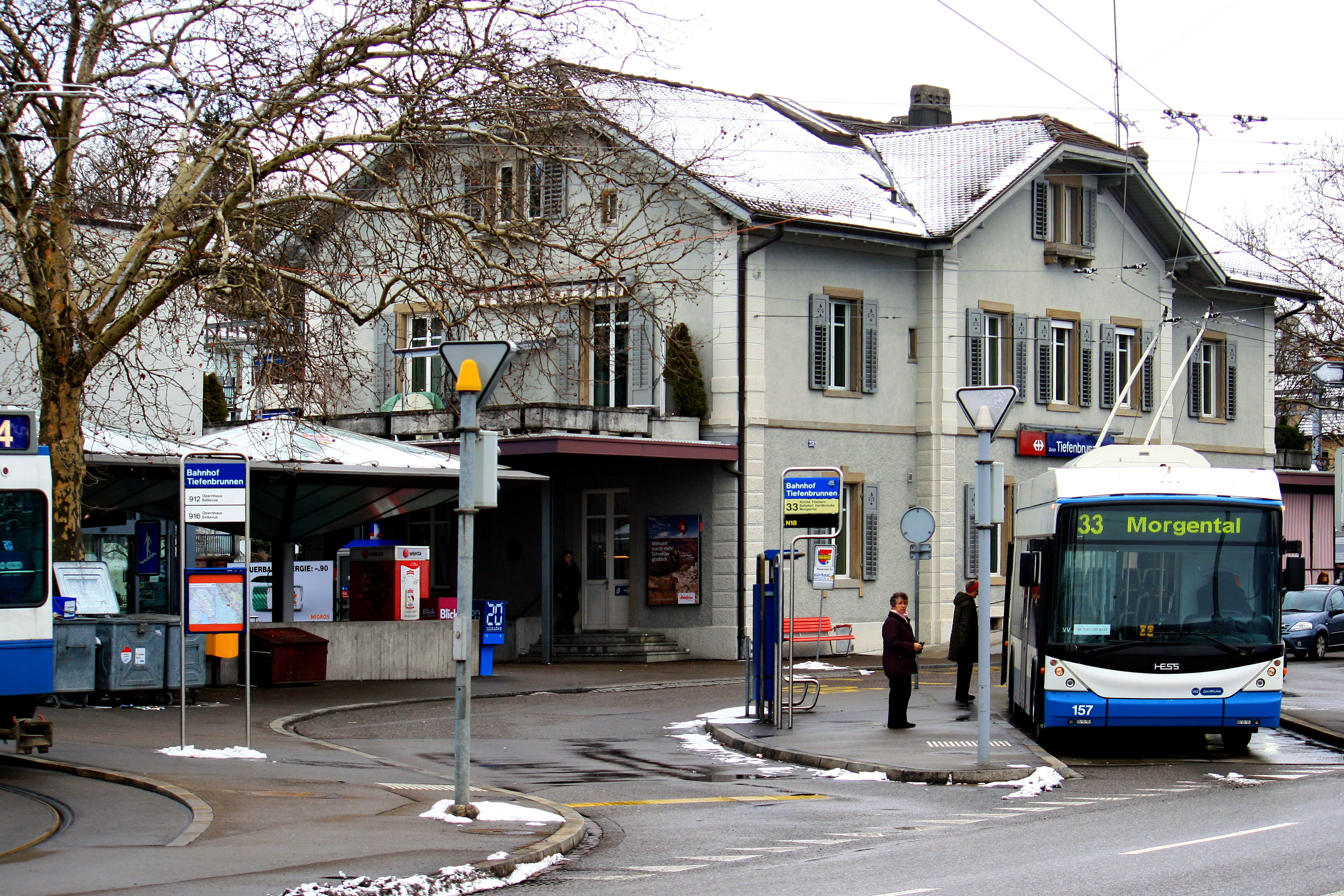
A Swisstrolley 3 at Tiefenbrunnen

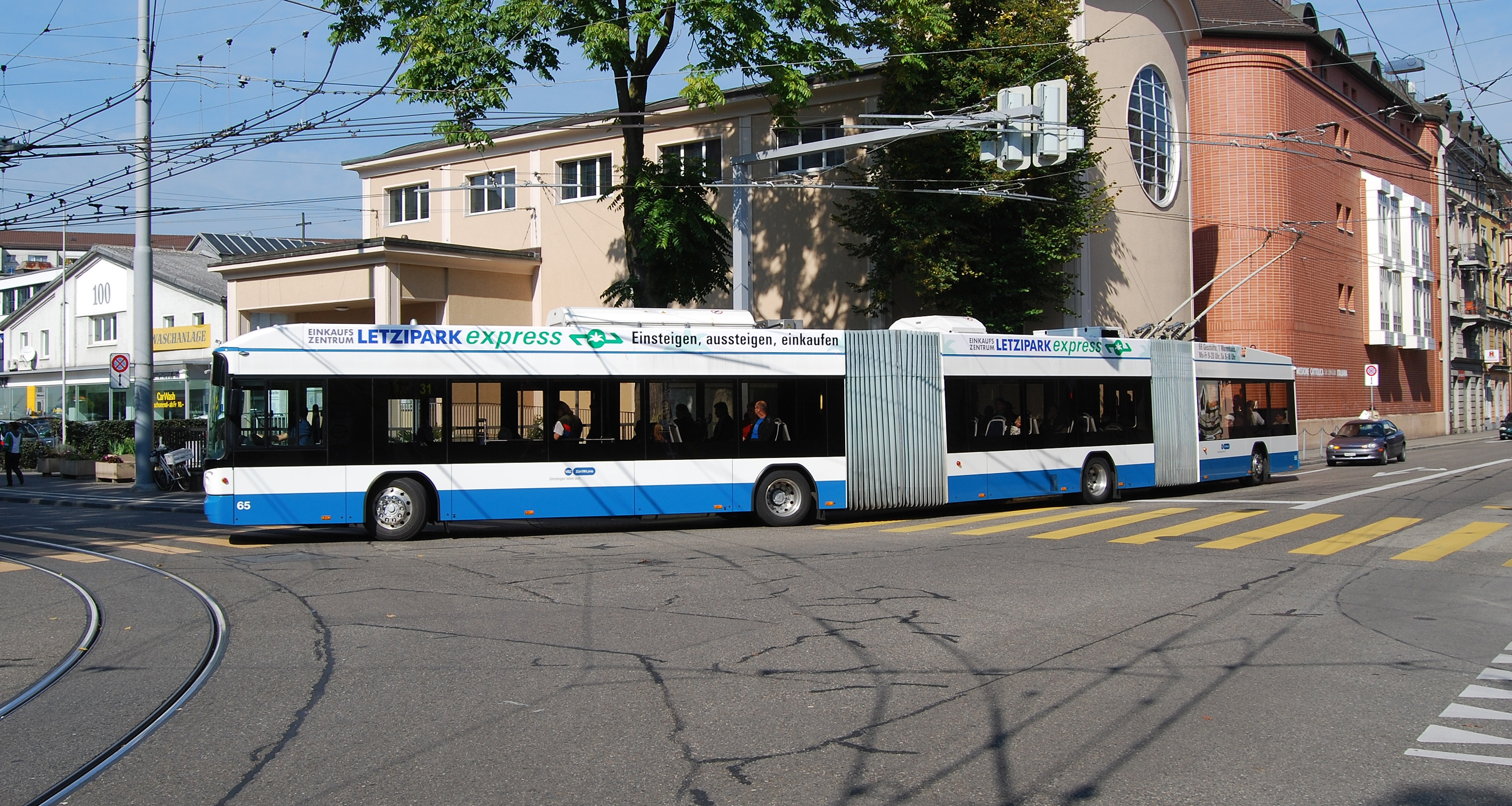
A Hess lighTram on line 31

As of 2026, the active Zurich trolleybus fleet stands at around 113 vehicles, all of which are low-floor. All are also articulated, with around half being conventional single-articulated and around half being double-articulated.

Fleet nos.	Qty.	Manufacturer	Electrics	Model	Type	Year built
1–13	13	Hess	Kiepe	lighTram 25DC	Bi-articulated	2025–2026
61–77	17	Hess	Kiepe	lightram BGGT-N2C	Bi-articulated	2006–2007
78–91	14	Hess	Kiepe	lightram BGGT-N2C	Bi-articulated	2012–2014
92–94	3	Hess	Kiepe	lightram 25DC	Bi-articulated	2018
144–161	18	Hess	Kiepe	Swisstrolley-3 BGT-N2C	Articulated	2006–2007
162–182	21	Hess	Kiepe	Swisstrolley-4 BGT-N2D	Articulated	2013
183	1	Hess	Kiepe	Swisstrolley-5	Articulated	2016
200–209	10	Hess	Kiepe	lighTram 19DC	Articulated	2020–2021
210–225	16	Hess	Kiepe	lighTram 19DC	Articulated	2024–2025

== See also ==
- Public transport in Zurich
- List of trolleybus systems in Switzerland
- Zurich model
