= Käferberg Tunnel =

Railway tunnel in Zürich, Switzerland

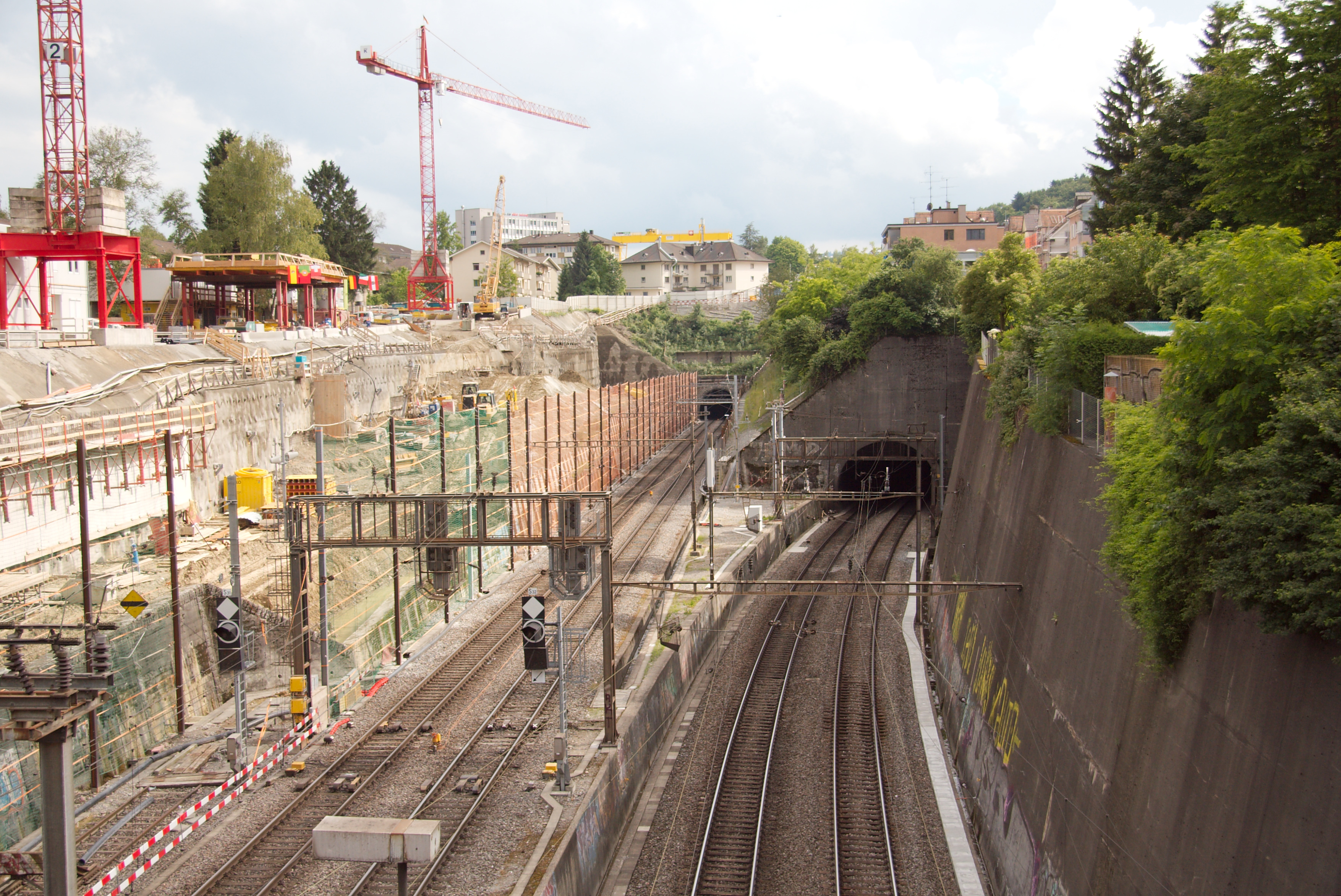
- Northern portal of the Käferberg Tunnel (to the right)
- Interactive map of Käferberg Tunnel

Overview
- Line: Zürich–Winterthur
- Location: Zürich, Switzerland
- Coordinates: 47.4032°N 8.5339°E
- Status: Active

Operation
- Opened: 1969
- Owner: Swiss Federal Railways
- Operator: Swiss Federal Railways
- Traffic: Rail
- Character: Passenger and freight

Technical
- Length: 2,119 metres (6,952 ft) (before extension)
- No. of tracks: 2
- Track gauge: 1,435 mm (4 ft 8 1/2 in)
- Electrified: Overhead catenary 15 kV/16.7 Hz

The Käferberg Tunnel (German: Käferbergtunnel) is a railway tunnel in the Swiss city of Zürich. The tunnel runs under the Käferberg hill from the western approaches to Zürich Hauptbahnhof to a portal to the south of Oerlikon station. It is 2,119 metres (6,952 ft) long and carries twin standard gauge (1,435 mm or 4 ft 8 1/2 in) tracks electrified at 15 kV/16.7 Hz using overhead catenary.

Heading south from the southern portal of the tunnel, the railway first crosses the River Limmat and Hardturmstrasse on a concrete viaduct. Still on viaduct the line splits into two, with the right hand leg being a single-track viaduct that descends into Zürich Altstetten station. The left hand leg, still double track and on viaduct, runs into the upper level of Zürich Hardbrücke station, before continuing its descent into the Hauptbahnhof.

The tunnel was opened in 1969. As built, only the Altstetten leg of the southern connecting lines existed, and the tunnel was only usable by freight and other trains that bypassed Hauptbahnhof station. In 1982, Hardbrücke station and its leg of the connecting lines opened, allowing the tunnel to be used by trains running between Hauptbahnhof and Oerlikon.

Today the tunnel carries Zürich S-Bahn lines S5, S6, S7, S9, S15, S16 and S21, all of which operate via Hardbrücke. It also carries freight traffic, which runs via the Altstetten link.

The Käferberg Tunnel is now one of three different routes from Oerlikon to Hauptbahnhof, each of which tunnels through the intermediate ridge and emerge from adjacent portals to the south of Oerlikon station. Like the Käferberg Tunnel, the Wipkingen Tunnel (opened in 1856) connects to the Hauptbahnhof's western approaches, whilst the Weinberg Tunnel (opened in 2014) accesses the Hauptbahnhof's lower level through platforms from the east.
