= Käferberg =

Summits of a wooded mountain

Käferberg-Waidberg
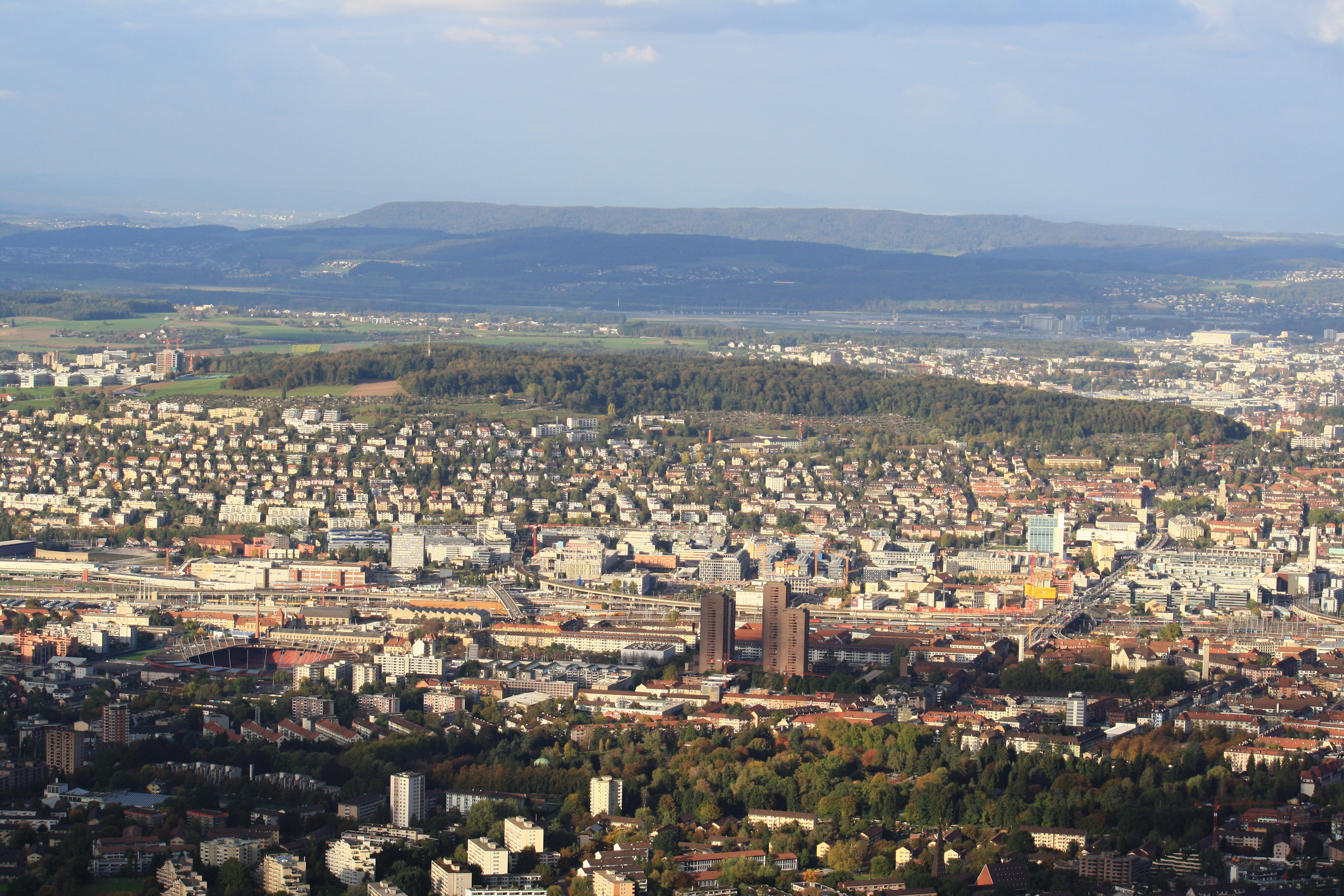
- Zürich-Altstetten and Höngg and Käferberg-Waidberg, as seen from Uetliberg, Rümlang (to the left) and Kloten airport in the background.

Highest point
- Elevation: 601 m (1,972 ft)
- Coordinates: 47.40533°N 8.52021°E

Geography
- Location: Zürich, Switzerland

Climbing
- Easiest route: Tram and bus

Käferberg (el. 571 metres or 1,873 feet) and Waidberg (el. 601 metres or 1,972 feet) are the summits of a wooded range of hills overlooking the inner city of Zürich, Zürichsee, Albis chain and Uetliberg, as well as the Limmat Valley and the Zürcher Unterland in Switzerland.

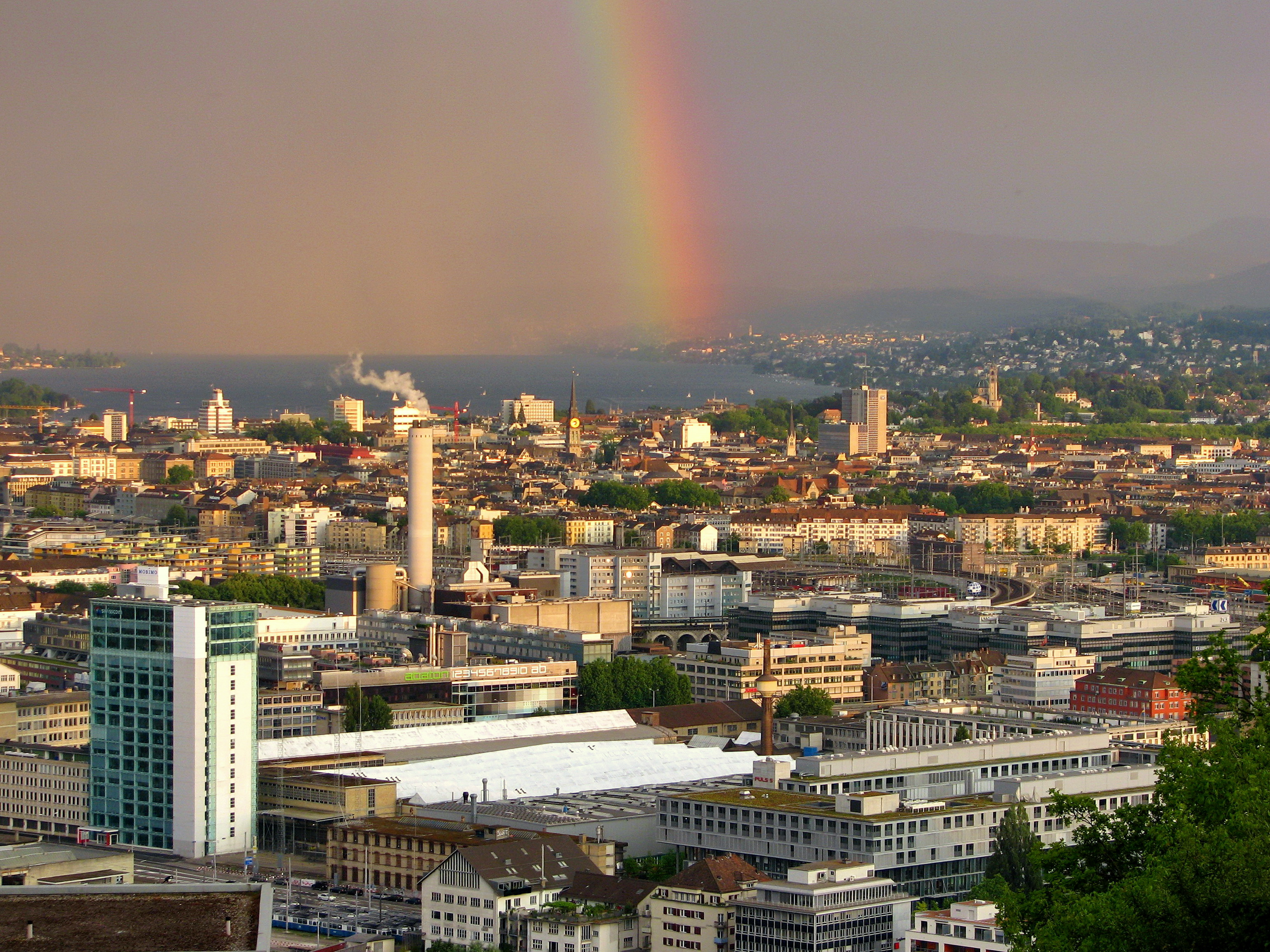
"Downtown" Zürich as seen from Käferberg

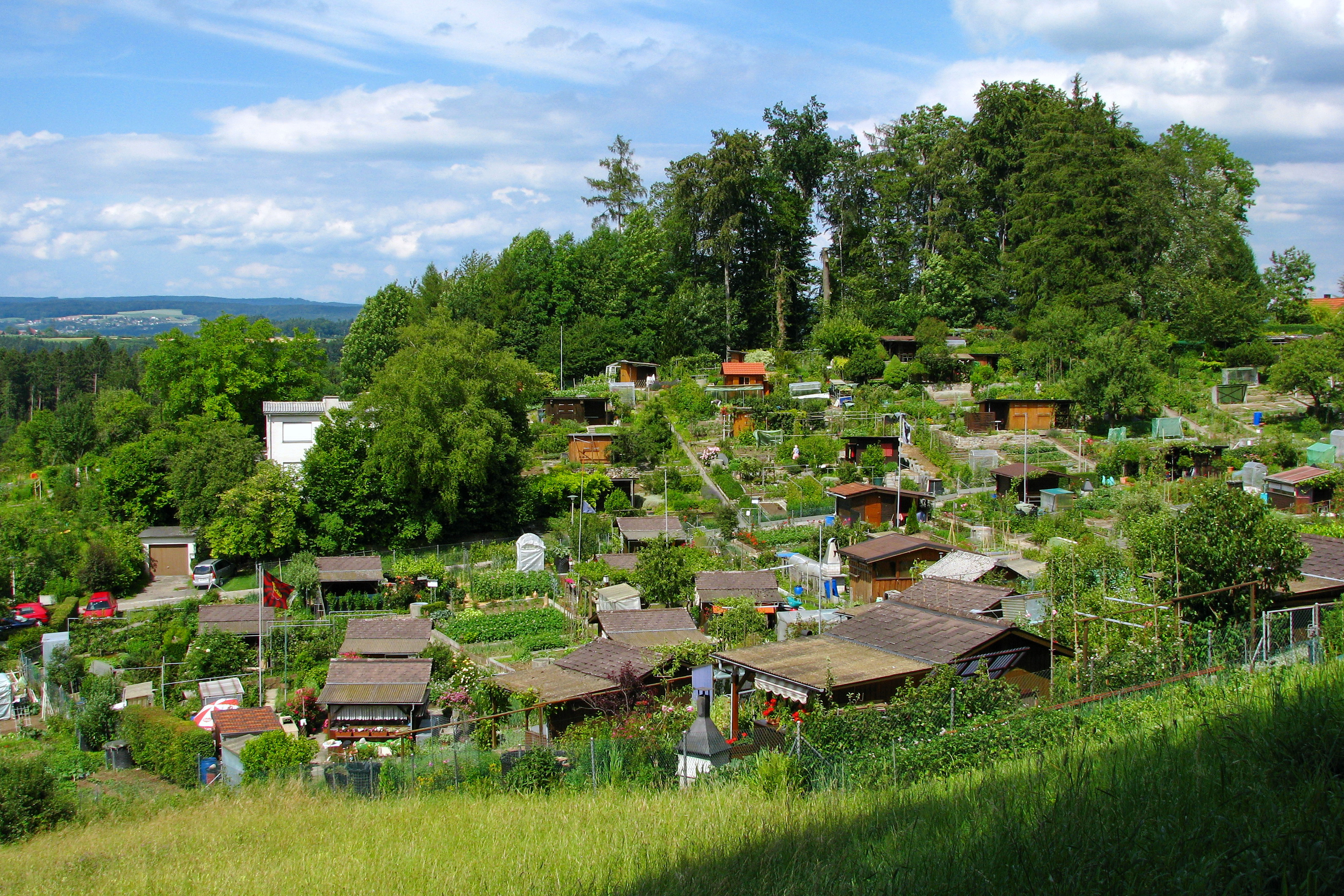
Schrebergärten on northern Käferberg in Affoltern quarter

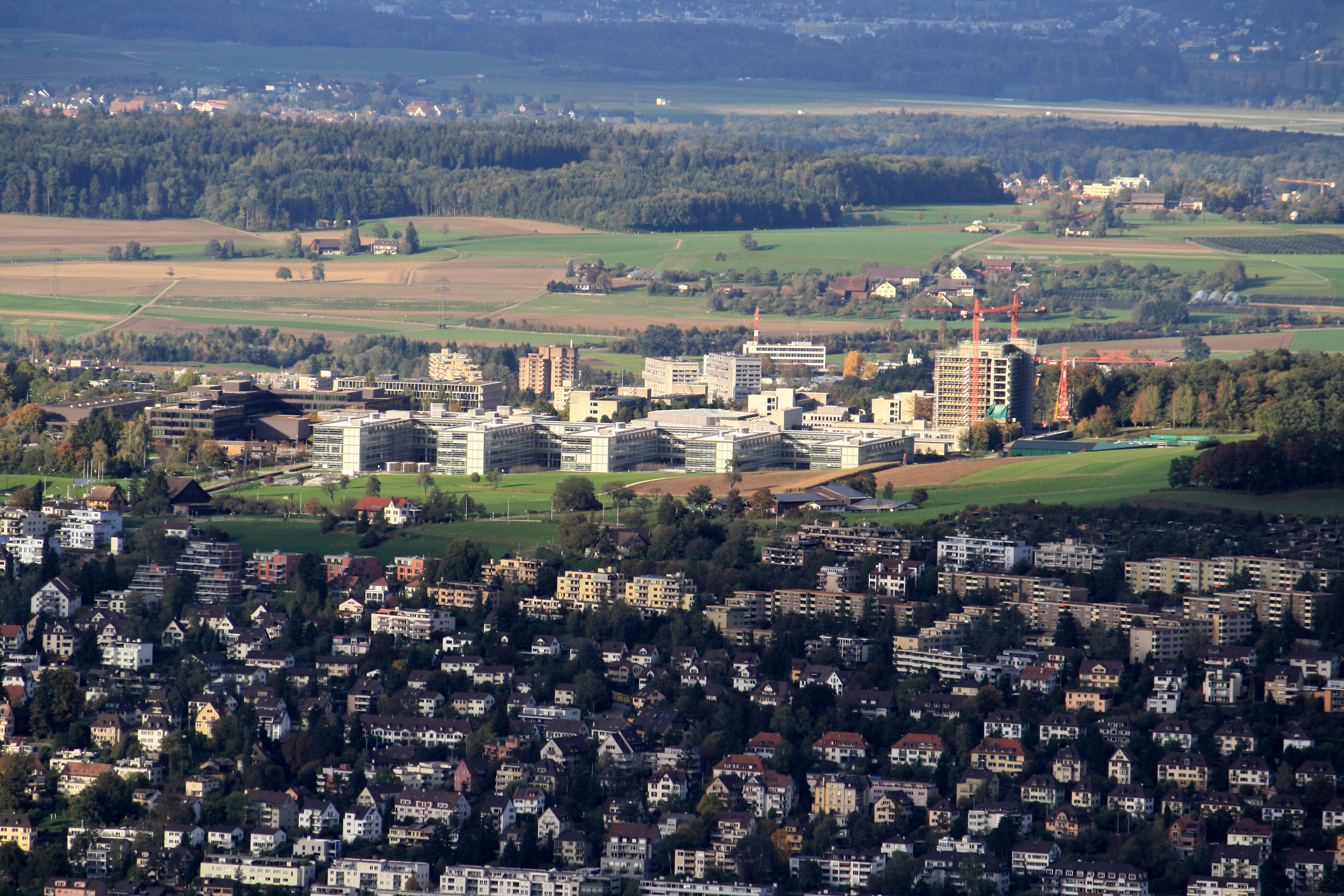
ETH Hönggerberg and Zürich-Höngg, as seen from Uetliberg, Rümlang in the background

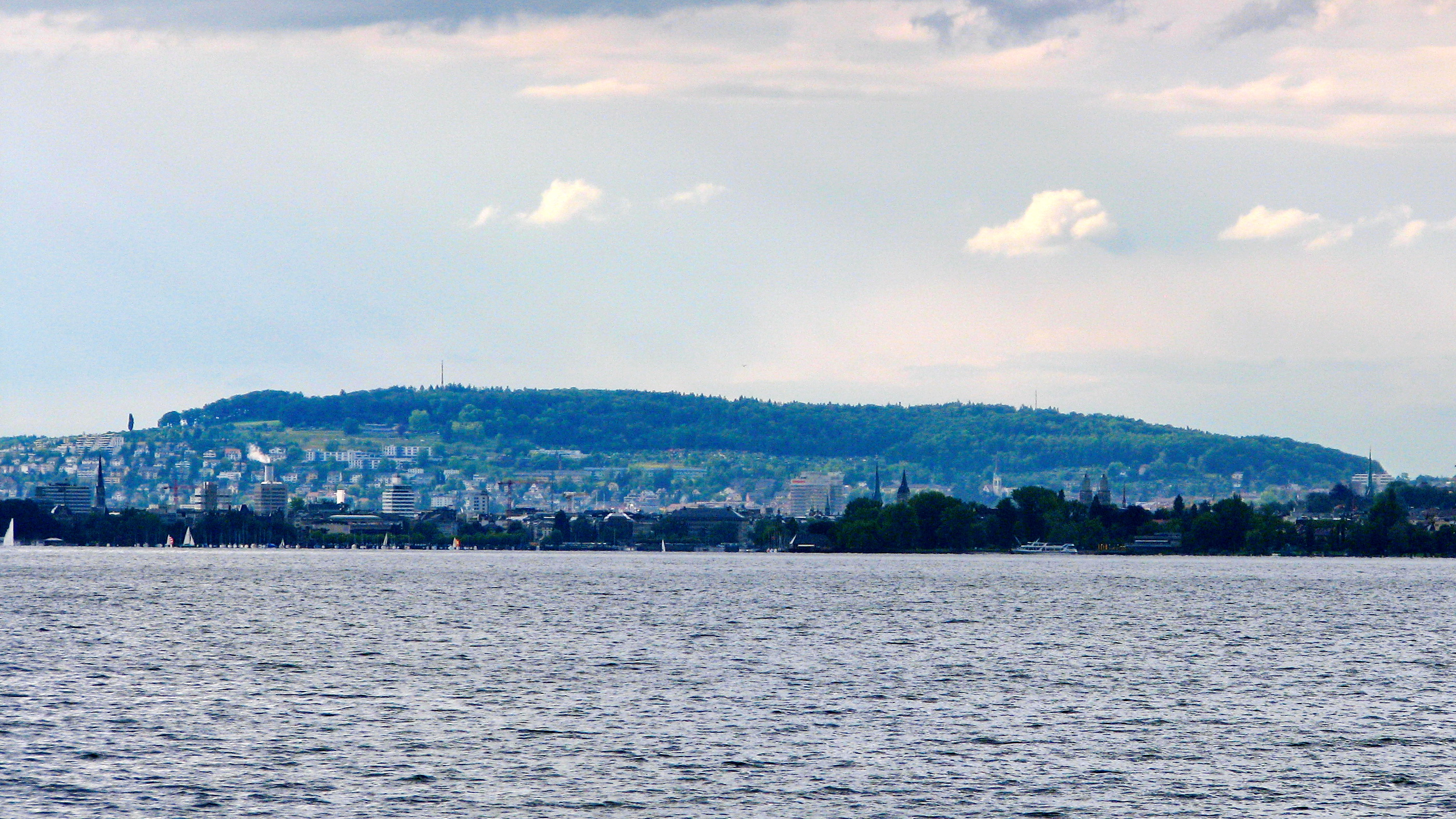
Waidberg (to the left) and Käferberg summits as seen from Zürichsee (Lake Zürich)

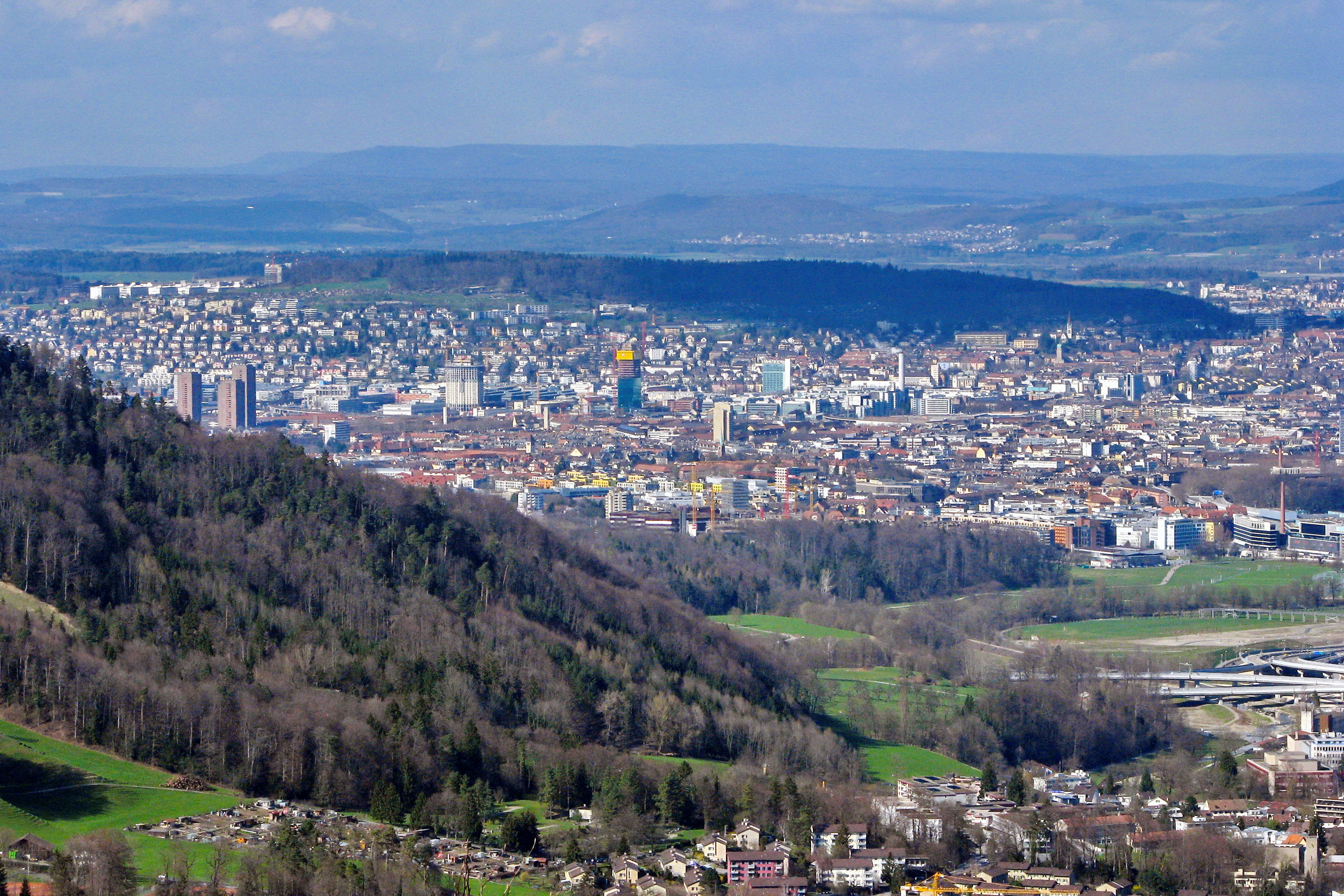
Käferberg and upper Limmat Valley, as seen from Felsenegg

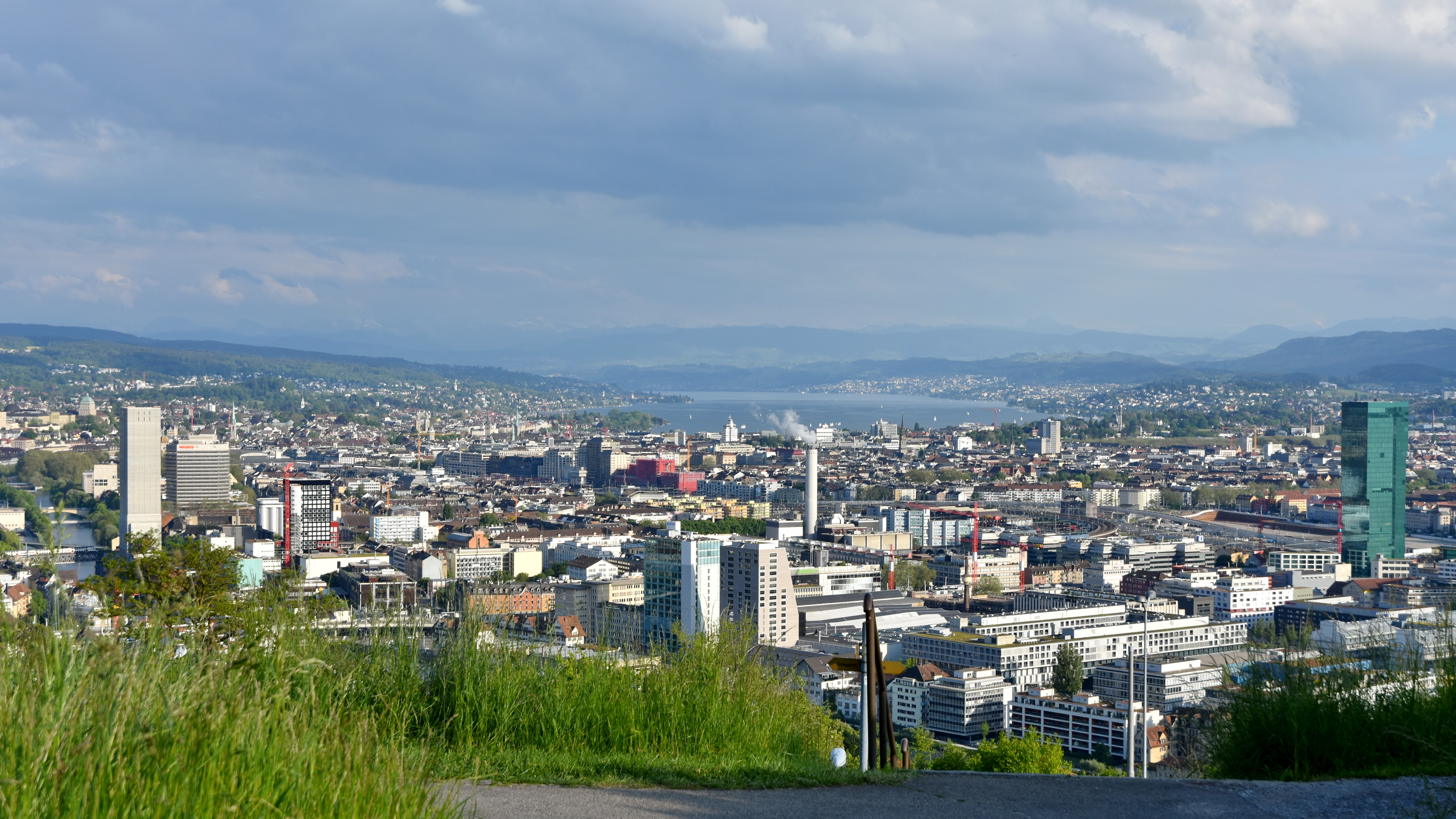
View from on the upper Limmat Valley at Zürich towards Zürichsee: Adlisberg and Pfannenstiel to the left, the Zimmerberg plateau, Albis and Sihl Valley to the right, the Swissmill Tower in the foreground to the left.

== Geography ==
Käferberg (Swiss German: Chäferberg meaning mountain of beetles) and Waidberg (mountain of meadows) are the peaks of a longish mountain in the north of the Limmat Valley. It is located in the Zürich districts of Höngg, Wipkingen and Affoltern, between Bucheggplatz and ETH-Hönggerberg, known as Science City, and the western Hönggerberg heading on the northern border of the Limmat valley to Würenlos. In the east, Käferberg is bordered by a small mountain pass between Bucheggplatz (472 metres or 1,549 feet) and Milchbuck (476 metres or 1,562 feet) at Zürichberg, leading from the city of Zürich to the Glatt valley. In the north, the region is bordered by the Glatt, Wehn and Furt valleys.

Its highest point (Waidberg) is about 200 metres (656 ft) above the Limmat Valley. From northwest to southeast, Käferberg-Waidberg is part of a chain of peaks respectively mountains: Hönggerberg (541 metres or 1,775 feet), Käferberg-Waidberg, Zürichberg (676 metres or 2,218 feet), Adlisberg (701 metres or 2,300 feet), Öschbrig (696 metres or 2,283 feet), Wassberg (715 metres or 2,346 feet), Forch mountain pass, Guldenen (778 metres or 2,552 feet) and Pfannenstiel (873 metres or 2,864 feet).

== Points of interest ==
It is a picturesque location, and the upper southwestern side is also the location of restaurants overlooking the city of Zürich and the Limmat Valley. The upper area of the mountain is mostly woodland and a popular recreational area with picnic sites, in addition there are hiking routes heading from Bucheggplatz to the canton of Aargau and a Vita Parcours. Rarely to find in the urban area of Zürich are Centaurea, Salvia pratensis, Knautia and Sand Lizards on the southwestern upper hill. Schrebergärten are typical for the southern and northern upper parts, too. The Wärmebad Käferberg is located in the south nearby the city hospital Waid (Waidspital) and a Deer inhabit.

Another restaurant, a Tennis club and a small TV tower are situated within the woodland at Waidberg summit, nearby the former Freibad (public open air bath) Waidbad which is now a popular pic-nic site, too. The area is used for recreation and sport on a clearing not far from the ETH-Hönggerberg. There was a project to renew the Waidbad as a site of wellness, to integrate the area in a so-called "forest spa" including indoor baths, sauna, cafeteria, complete infrastructure and attractive outdoor grounds.

== ETH Zurich "Science City" ==
Science City is a campus of the ETH Zurich located on the eastern Käferberg slope respectively on western part of the Hönggerberg hill (officially the campus is named "ETH Hönggerberg", too). ETH Zurich declares it as vision of a university campus and a "City district of brainstorming culture" which will transform the ETH site into a place with greater quality of life through a variety of measures. It is also declared as a platform that will make it possible for the ETH Zurich to realize future projects that are based on the pioneering and symbolic development of future living and cognitive space.

== Transportation ==
The tram numbers 11 and 15 to Bucheggplatz, tram 13 alongside the southern area to Frankental as well as the bus line 80 Oerlikon–Altstetten–Triemli, bus line 38 (Höngg), trolley bus line 46 (City–Rütihof) and bus line 69 (Milchbuck–Hönggerberg) run up to different parts of the mountain area.

The 2,119 metres (6,952 ft) long Käferberg Tunnel runs under a shoulder of the hill, carrying trains, including those of S-Bahn Zürich lines S5, S6, S7 and S16, between Hardbrücke and Oerlikon stations.

In September 2014 a study was published for the construction of a new rail tunnel and underground station serving the ETH Hönggerberg "Science City". The new tunnel would run directly between Hardbrücke and Regensdorf stations, as opposed to the indirect route via the existing Käferberg Tunnel and Oerlikon station that is currently used by service S6.

== History ==
In addition to a total of 15 bastions and Letzinen (palisades) outside of the Fortifications of Zürich, in the 17th century the area was part of the so-called third fortifications of the city of Zürich. Since 1907, the houses "Zur Waid" served as Krankenheim, a small public hospital. The so-called Waidgut was rebuilt in 1918 as an urban nursing home which is since 1962/3 the care center Käferberg. As part of the incorporation of the former municipality Höngg, the forest area on Käferberg owned by the citizens was sold in 1934 to the city of Zürich as well as the other areas of the former urban forest located there. Even today, there are large, contiguous agricultural land in the immediate neighborhood of the "Science City".

== Literature ==
- Hochbaudepartement der Stadt Zürich, Amt für Städtebau: Affoltern, Oerlikon, Schwamendingen, Seebach. Baukultur in Zürich, Band I, Verlag Neue Zürcher Zeitung, Zürich 2003, ISBN 3-03823-034-0.
- Martin Bürlimann, Kurt Gammeter: Wipkingen - Vom Dorf zum Quartier. Wibichinga Verlag, Zürich Wipkingen 2006, ISBN 3-9523149-0-0.
