= Zurich Seebach railway station =

Railway station in the Seebach quarter of the Swiss city of Zürich

Zürich Seebach
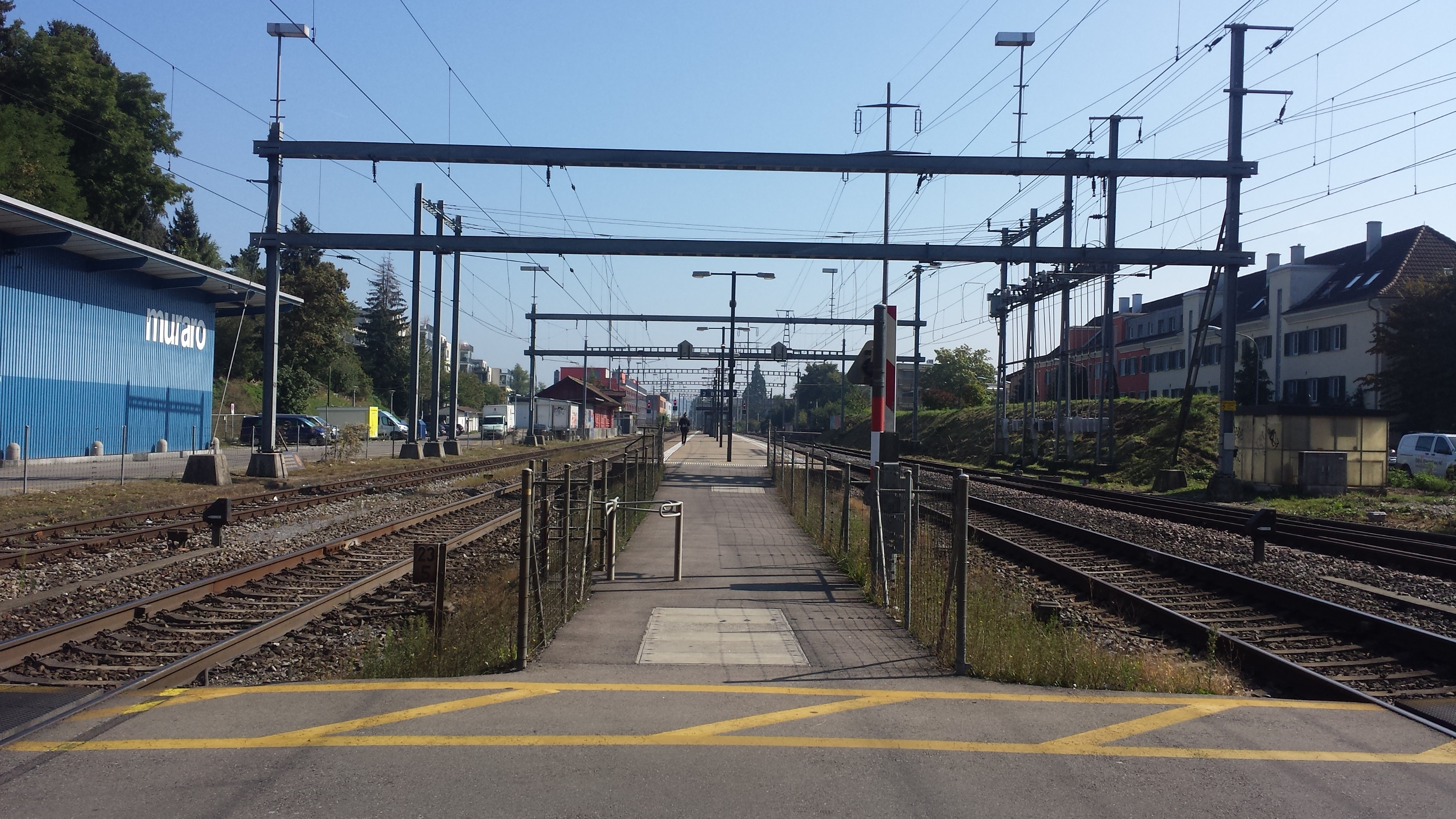
- The platform seen from the level crossing access.

General information
- Location: Bahnhaldenstrasse, City of Zürich, Canton of Zürich, Switzerland
- Coordinates: 47.4186°N 8.5440°E
- Elevation: 442 m (1,450 ft)
- Owner: Swiss Federal Railways
- Operator: Swiss Federal Railways
- Line: Wettingen–Effretikon railway line (Furttal line)
- Platforms: 1 island platform
- Tracks: 4
- Connections: ZVV: Seebacherplatz
- Tram: VBZ tram 51
- Bus: VBZ buses 40 42 75, VBG bus 768
- Airport: VBG bus 768 to/from Zürich Flughafen in ca. 0:16h

Construction
- Architect: Max Vogt

Other information
- Fare zone: ZVV 110

History
- Opened: 1877 (station building: 1959)

Passengers
- 2018: 1,500 per weekday

Services
Preceding station	Zurich S-Bahn	Following station
Zürich Affoltern towards Baden	S6	Zürich Oerlikon towards Uetikon
Zürich Affoltern towards Würenlos	SN6 Limited service	Zürich Oerlikon towards Winterthur
Location
- Location within Switzerland Location within Canton of Zürich

Zürich Seebach is a railway station in the Seebach quarter of the Swiss city of Zurich. It is located on the Wettingen–Effretikon railway line (Furttal line) within fare zone 110 of the Zürcher Verkehrsverbund (ZVV).

== Infrastructure ==
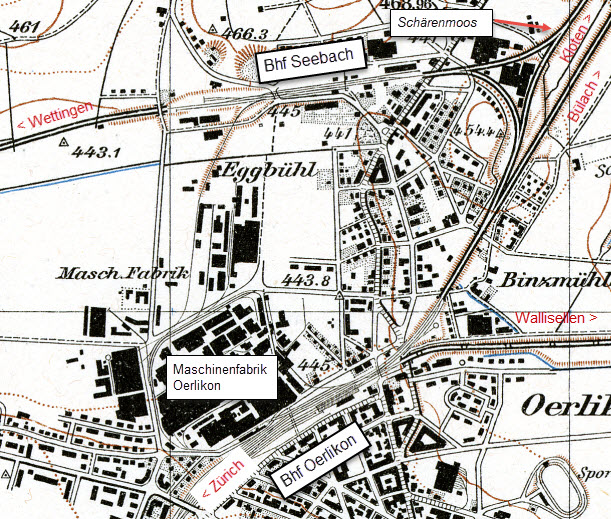
Curve (top right) between Seebach and Oerlikon stations (1932)

The station is aligned on a west to east axis, and has two through platform tracks serving a single island platform, together with a number of non-platform through tracks and sidings. The platform is accessed at its eastern end by a subway, and at its western end by an access to the centre of the adjacent level crossing. The platform has no roof, but there is a shelter near the subway.

To the west the Furttal line continues as a dual track railway towards Zürich Affoltern. To the east the line splits into two single track lines, one curving south to join the Oerlikon–Bülach line towards Zürich Oerlikon (used by passenger trains) whilst the other joins the same line heading northbound. The latter line is only used by cargo trains. Zürich Seebach station sees significant through freight traffic, most of which takes the Furttal line in order to avoid passing through central Zürich, using the northern connector (via Kloten and Effretikon) onto or off the Zürich–Winterthur line.

Zürich Seebach station and Zürich Oerlikon station are less than 800 metres (0.50 miles) apart as the crow flies, and their platforms run nearly parallel. Trains between Oerlikon and Seebach use a narrow curve at slow speed. This curve was built in 1909 by Swiss Federal Railways to allow access from Zürich HB to the Furttal line (the latter was built to bypass the Zürich city center).

The station building, an early work of architect Max Vogt (1925–2019), was built in 1959. It is no longer used.

== Service ==
Zürich Seebach station is served by S-Bahn trains only. The S6 service of the Zürich S-Bahn calls at the station, whereas the S21 peak hour service passes through. The S6 provides half-hourly connections to Zürich HB, taking 12 minutes, and continues along the Lake Zürich right-bank line to Uetikon. In the opposite direction, te S6 continues to Baden, taking 28 minutes for the journey. On weekends, there is also a nighttime S-Bahn service (SN6) offered by ZVV.

Summary of all S-Bahn services:

- Zürich S-Bahn:
  - S6: half-hourly service to Baden via Regensdorf-Watt, and to Uetikon via Zürich HB.
  - Nighttime S-Bahn (only during weekends):
    - SN6: hourly service to Würenlos, and to Winterthur via Zürich Stadelhofen.

The stations is not well connected to the Zürich tram network and bus routes. The closest tram/bus stop is Seebacherplatz, a ca. 3 minute walk from Seebach station. Better and more frequent connections exist at Zürich Oerlikon station.

== Gallery ==
Aerial view of station (towards east) from 1963

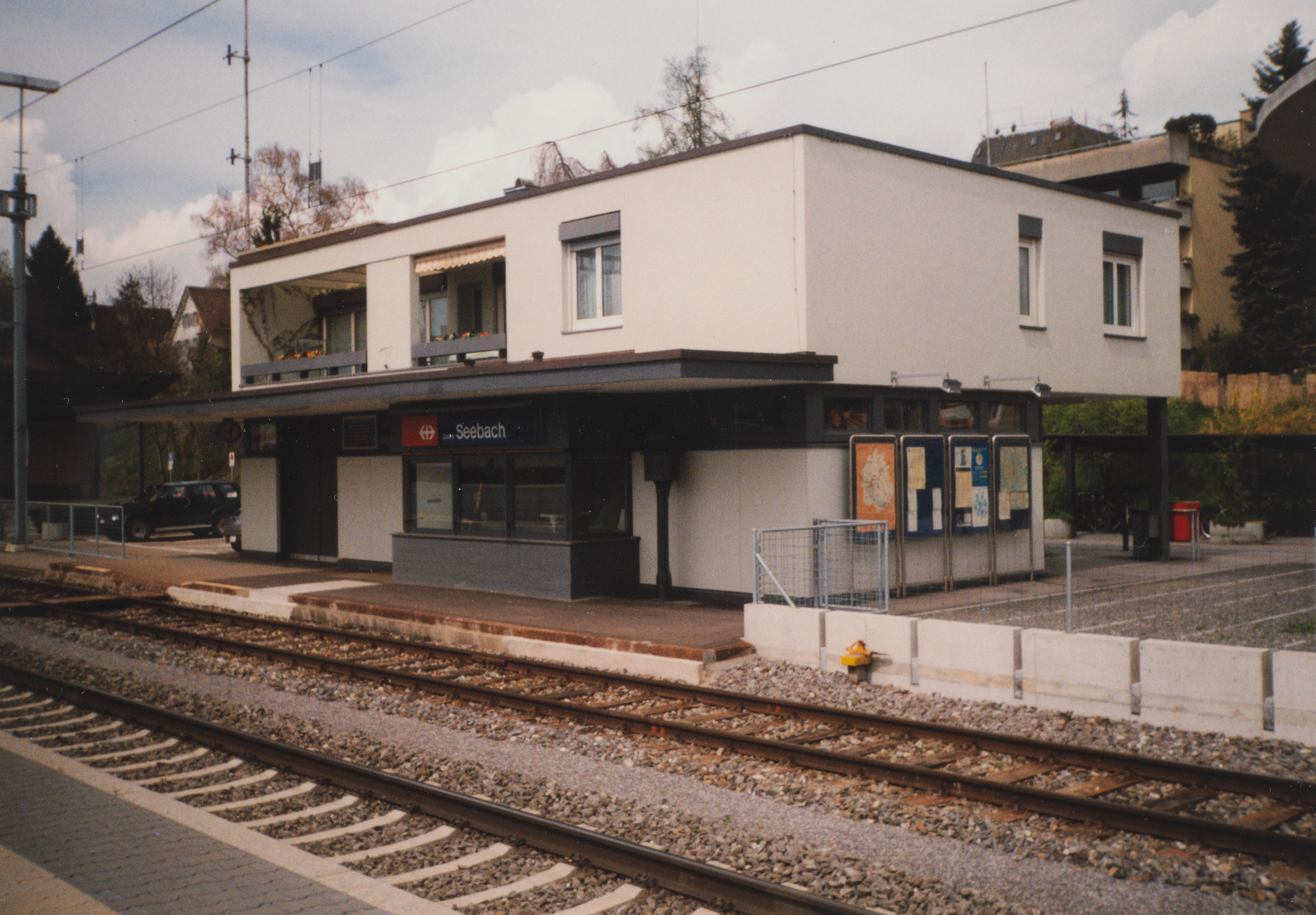
Station building by Max Vogt in 1999

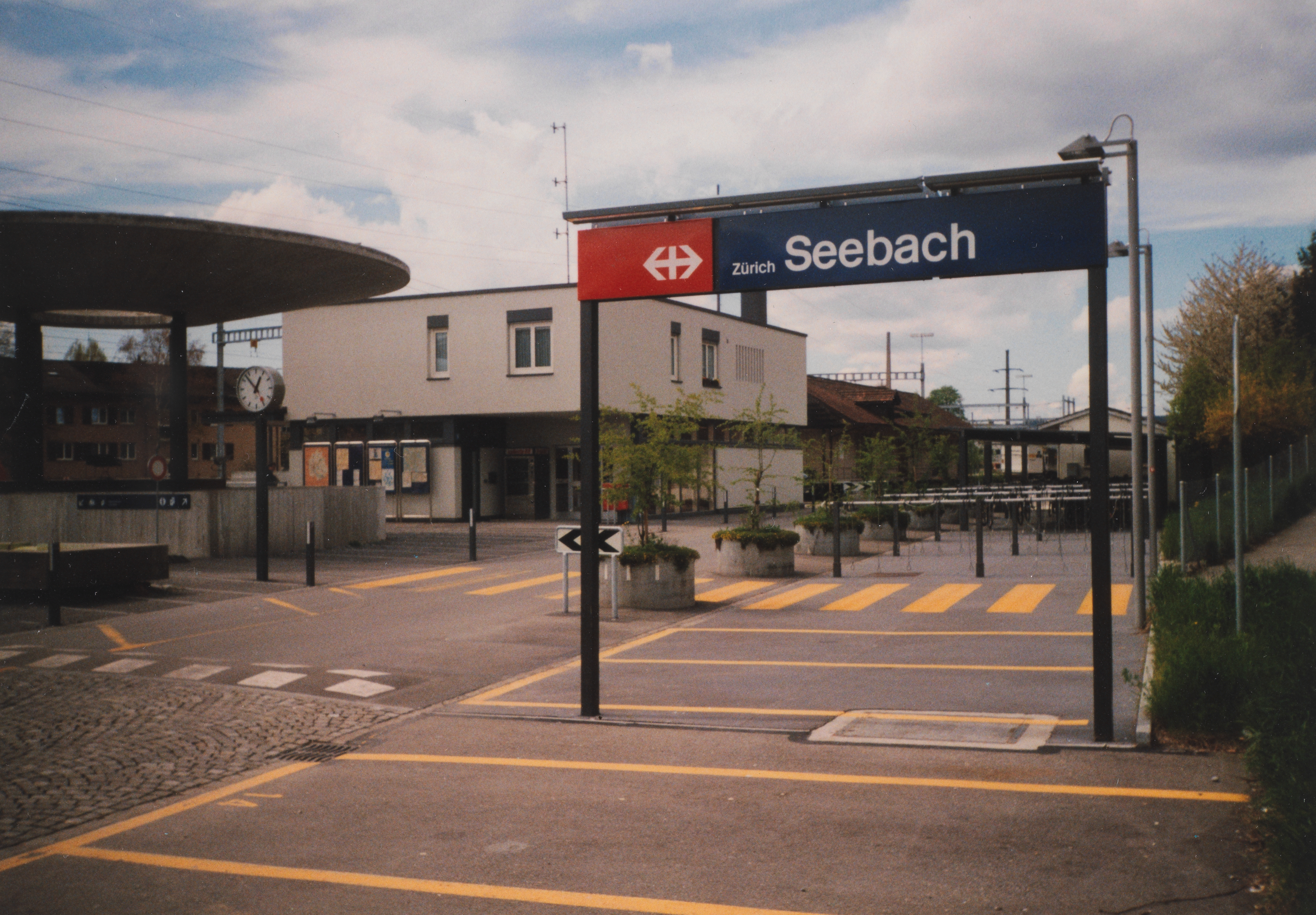
Station building and entrance to subway towards the platform

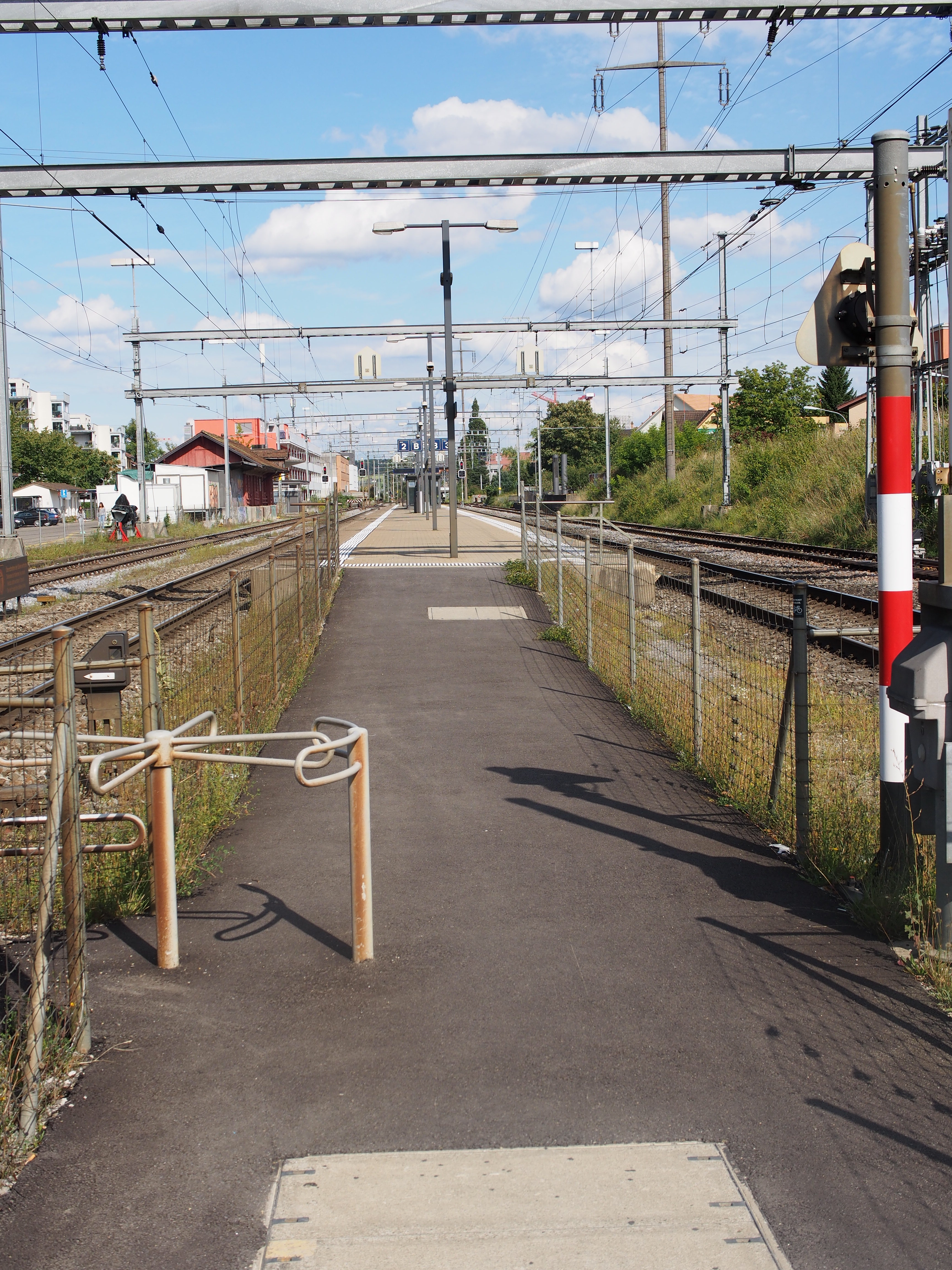
Western access to platform via the level crossing

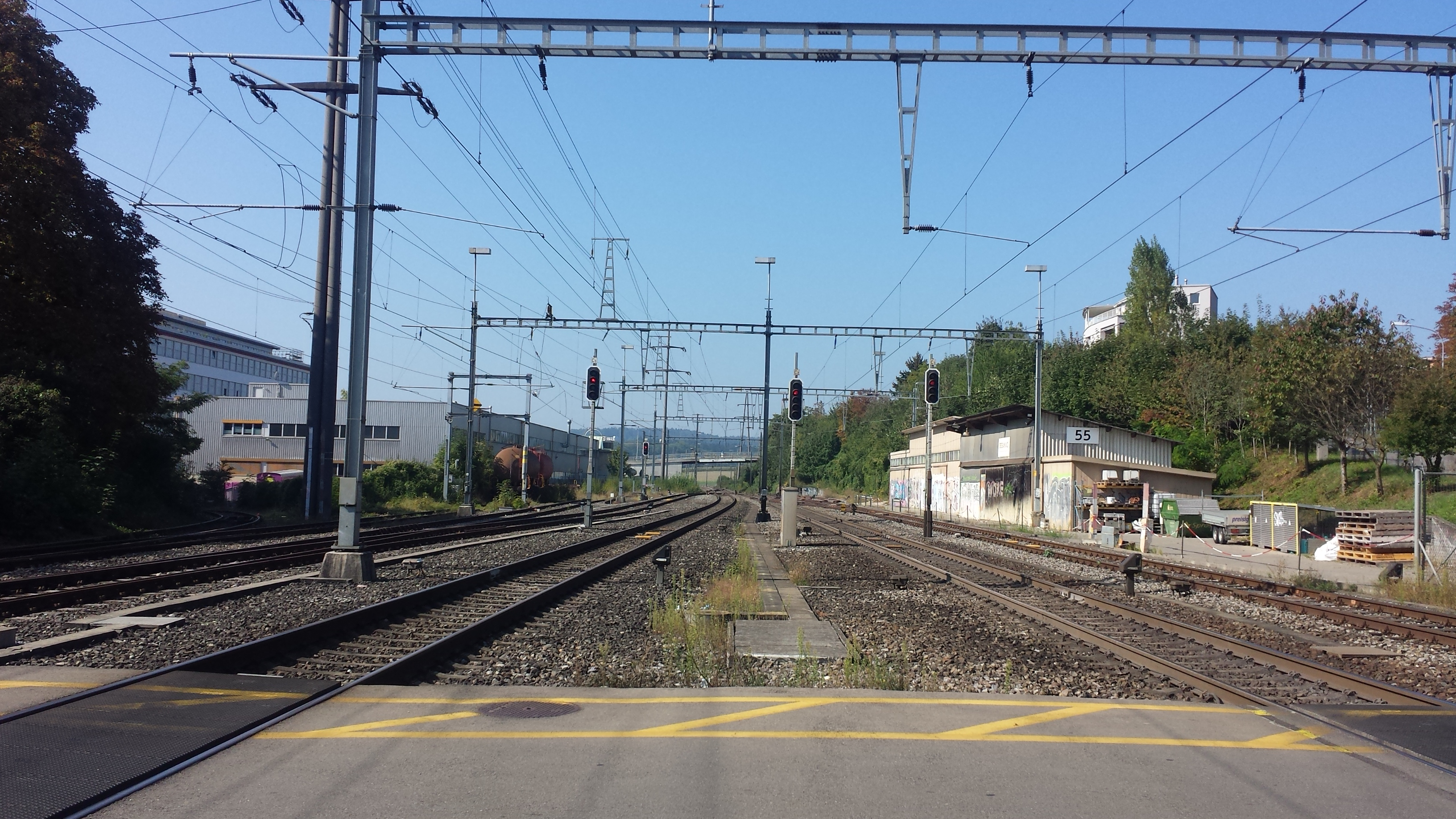
The view towards the west from the station platform

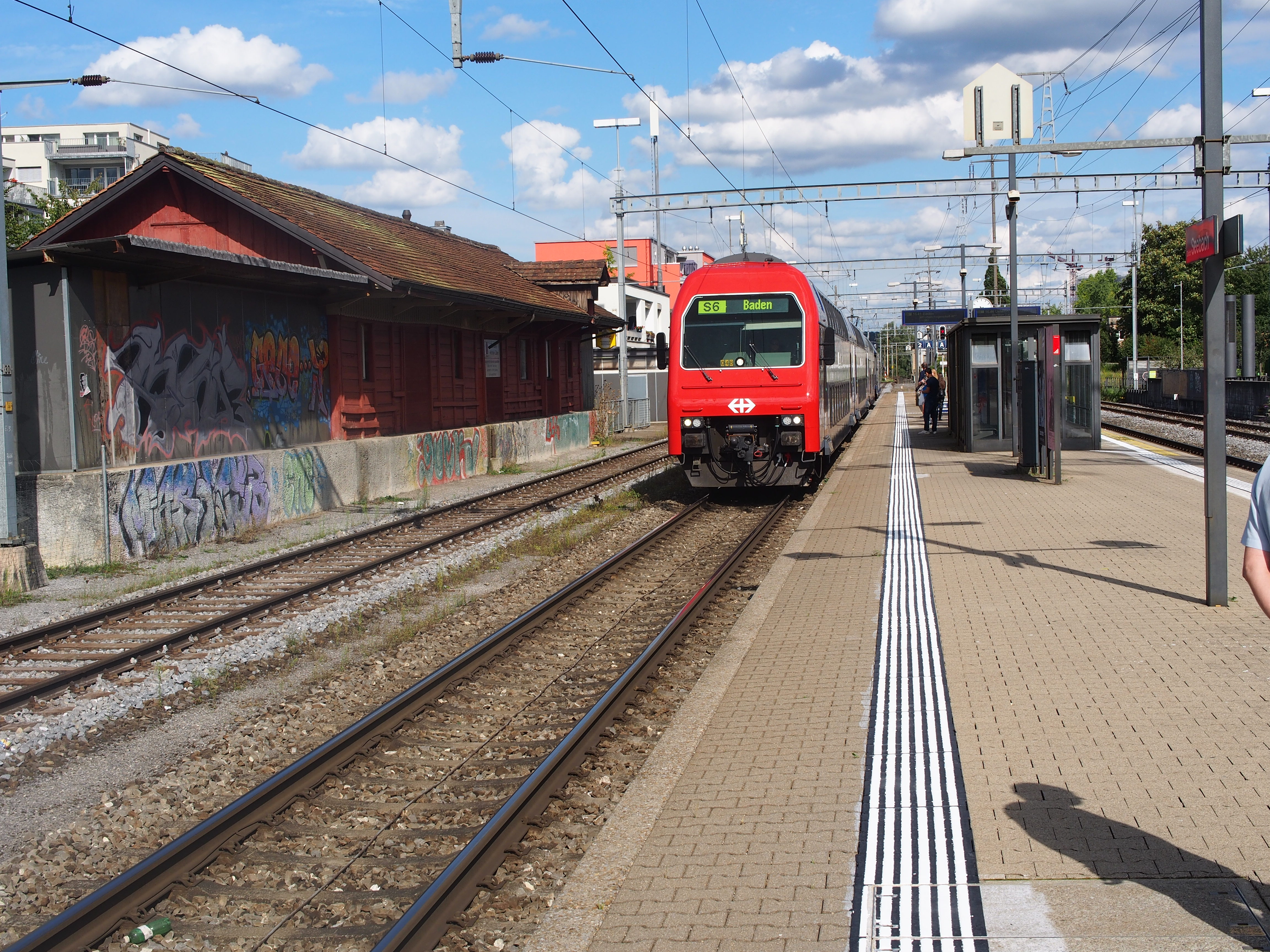
Platform and Re 450 class locomotive with double-deck carriages operating as S6 service

== See also ==
- List of railway stations in Zurich
- Public transport in Zurich
