= Zurich Affoltern railway station =

Railway station in the Affoltern quarter of the Swiss city of Zürich

Zürich Affoltern
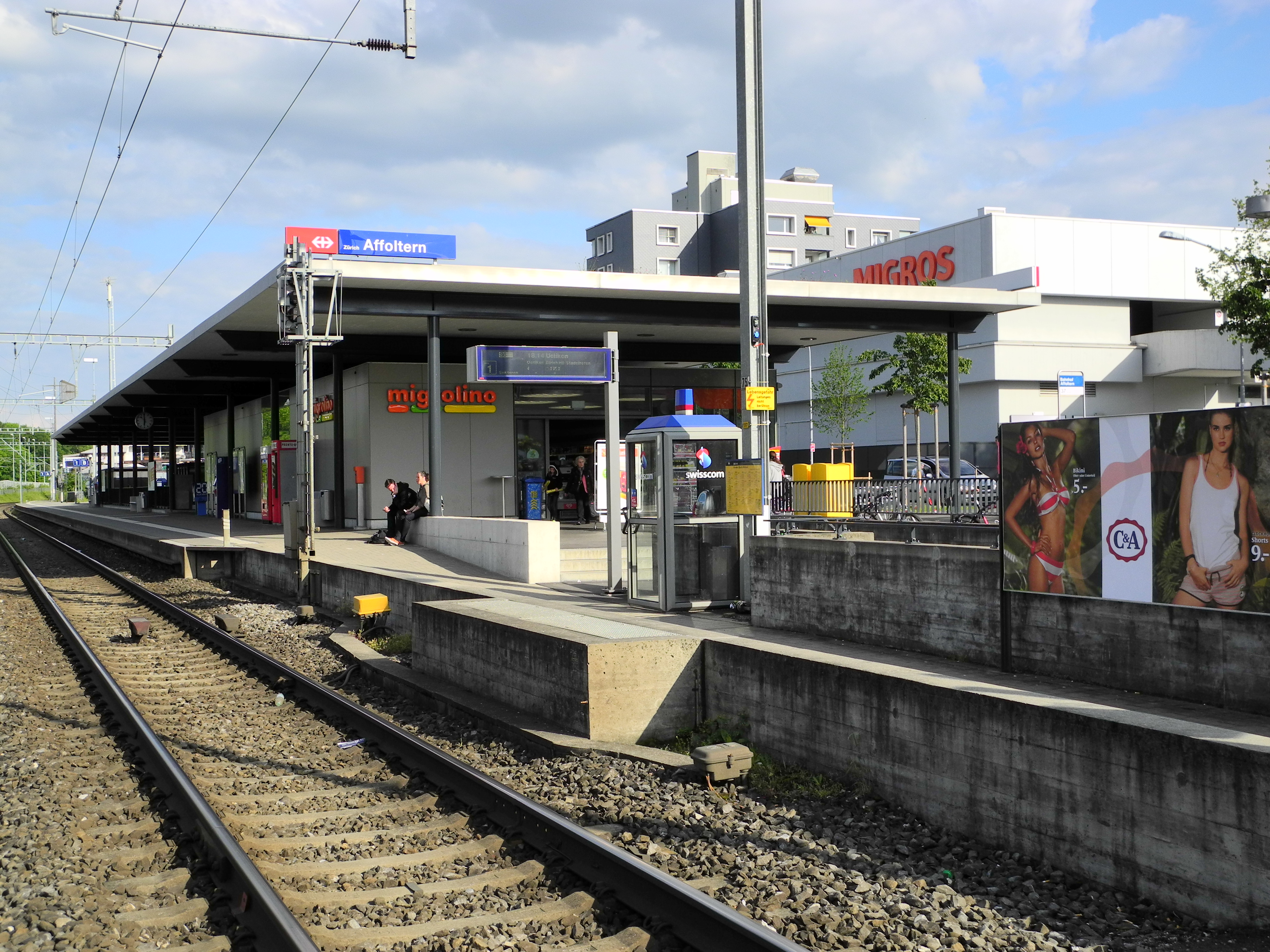
- The station in 2012, after rebuilding

General information
- Location: Riedenhaldenstrasse; Zurich; Switzerland
- Coordinates: 47°25′15″N 8°30′31″E
- Elevation: 456 m (1,496 ft)
- Owner: Swiss Federal Railways
- Line: Wettingen–Effretikon railway line
- Platforms: 2 side platforms
- Train operators: Swiss Federal Railways
- Connections: ZVV
- Bus: VBZ buses 37 44 61 62

Other information
- Fare zone: ZVV 110

Passengers
- 2018: 4,300 per weekday

Services
Preceding station	Zurich S-Bahn	Following station
Regensdorf-Watt towards Baden	S6	Zürich Seebach towards Uetikon
Regensdorf-Watt Terminus	S21 Limited service	Zürich Oerlikon towards Zürich HB
Regensdorf-Watt towards Würenlos	SN6 Limited service	Zürich Seebach towards Winterthur
Location

Zurich Affoltern railway station (German: Bahnhof Zürich Affoltern) is a railway station in the Affoltern quarter of the Swiss city of Zurich. The station is located on the Wettingen–Effretikon railway line (Furttal line) within fare zone 110 of the Zürcher Verkehrsverbund (ZVV).

The station is not to be confused with Affoltern am Albis railway station, which is located in Affoltern am Albis (Säuliamt), canton of Zürich.

== Infrastructure ==
In 2010, the station was rebuilt with the introduction of a convenience store and parking for 130 bicycles. The store is open 365 days a year from dawn to dusk and is part of the Migrolino chain owned the Migros company. The former station building (Alter Bahnhof) is situated to the west of the current location, on the opposite side of Zehntenhausstrasse.

== Service ==
The station is served by line S6 of the Zürich S-Bahn, along with bus routes 37, 61 and 62 of the Verkehrsbetriebe Zürich (VBZ). Some trains of the peak-hour service S21 also call at Zürich Affoltern station. On weekends, there is a nighttime S-Bahn service (SN6) offered by ZVV.

Summary of all S-Bahn services:

- Zurich S-Bahn:
  - S6: half-hourly service to Baden, and to Uetikon via Zürich HB.
  - S21: half-hourly service to Regensdorf-Watt, and to Zürich HB via Zürich Hardbrücke (limited service at Zürich Affoltern station).
  - Nighttime S-Bahn (only during weekends):
    - SN6: hourly service to Würenlos, and to Winterthur via Zürich Stadelhofen.

== See also ==
- List of railway stations in Zurich
- Public transport in Zurich
- Rail transport in Switzerland
