= Otelfingen railway station =

Railway station in Otelfingen, Switzerland

Otelfingen
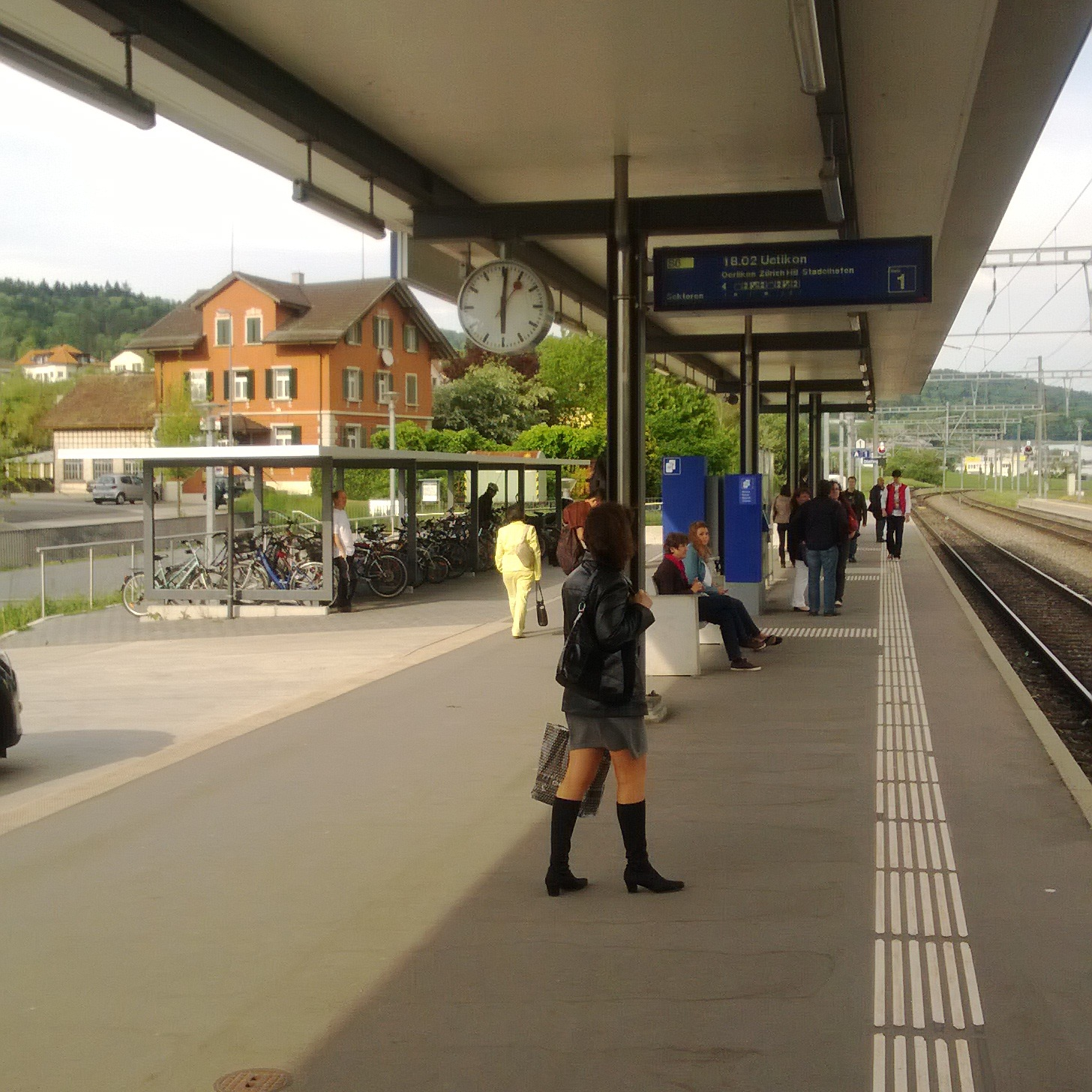

General information
- Location: Bahnhofstrasse, Otelfingen, Canton of Zürich, Switzerland
- Coordinates: 47.454665°N 8.387525°E
- Elevation: 427 m (1,401 ft)
- Owner: Swiss Federal Railways
- Operator: Swiss Federal Railways
- Line: Furttal line
- Platforms: 2 side platforms
- Tracks: 2
- Connections: ZVV
- Bus: VBG bus route 450

Other information
- Fare zone: ZVV 111

Services
Preceding station	Zurich S-Bahn	Following station
Würenlos towards Baden	S6	Otelfingen Golfpark towards Uetikon
Würenlos Terminus	SN6 Limited service	Buchs-Dällikon towards Winterthur
Location
- Location within Switzerland Location within Canton of Zurich

Otelfingen is a railway station in the Swiss canton of Zurich, in the municipality of Otelfingen. The station is located on the Furttal railway line between Wettingen and Zurich Oerlikon stations. It lies within fare zone 117 of the Zürcher Verkehrsverbund (ZVV).

It is one of two railway stations in the municipality of Otelfingen, the other being Otelfingen Golfpark.

== Service ==
=== Rail ===
Otelfingen is a stop of the Zurich S-Bahn served by trains on line S6, which operate half-hourly between Baden and Uetikon, via Zurich, with a journey time of just under 30 minutes to Zürich HB. On weekends (Friday and Saturday nights), there is a nighttime S-Bahn service (SN6) offered by ZVV.

Summary of all S-Bahn services:

- Zurich S-Bahn:
  - S6: half-hourly service to Baden, and to Uetikon via Zürich HB.
  - Nighttime S-Bahn (only during weekends):
    - SN6: hourly service to Würenlos, and to Winterthur via Zürich Stadelhofen.

=== Bus ===
The railway station is linked to the villages of Otelfingen and Boppelsen by Verkehrsbetriebe Glattal (VBG) bus route 450, which operates twice-hourly on Monday through Saturday.

== History ==
Otelfingen used to be a junction station with the former Niederglatt-Otelfingen railway line, which once connected with Niederglatt station on the Bülach branch of the Bülach-Regensberg Railway, but was closed to through trains in 1937. However, a short stretch of the line has been retained as a siding, and joins the main line just to the east of the station.

== See also ==
- History of rail transport in Switzerland
- Rail transport in Switzerland
