= Otelfingen Golfpark railway station =

Railway station in Otelfingen, Switzerland

Otelfingen Golfpark

General information
- Location: Industriestrasse; Otelfingen, Zurich; Switzerland
- Coordinates: 47.455756°N 8.402245°E
- Elevation: 427 m (1,401 ft)
- Owner: Swiss Federal Railways
- Operator: Swiss Federal Railways
- Line: Furttal line
- Platforms: 1 side platform
- Tracks: 1

Other information
- Fare zone: ZVV 117

Services
Preceding station	Zurich S-Bahn	Following station
Otelfingen towards Baden	S6	Buchs-Dällikon towards Uetikon
Location
- Location within Switzerland Location within Canton of Zurich

Otelfingen Golfpark is a railway station in the Swiss canton of Zurich, in the municipality of Otelfingen. The station is located on the Furttal railway line, within fare zone 117 of the Zürcher Verkehrsverbund (ZVV).

It is one of two railway stations in the municipality of Otelfingen, the other being Otelfingen.

== Service ==
Otelfingen Golfpark railway station is an intermediate stop on the Zurich S-Bahn line S6, which runs between Baden and Uetikon, via Regensdorf and Zurich. In summary:

- Zurich S-Bahn S6: half-hourly service to Baden, and to Uetikon via Zürich HB.

== See also ==
- Rail transport in Switzerland
