= Buchs-Dällikon railway station =

Railway station in Canton of Zürich, Switzerland

Buchs-Dällikon
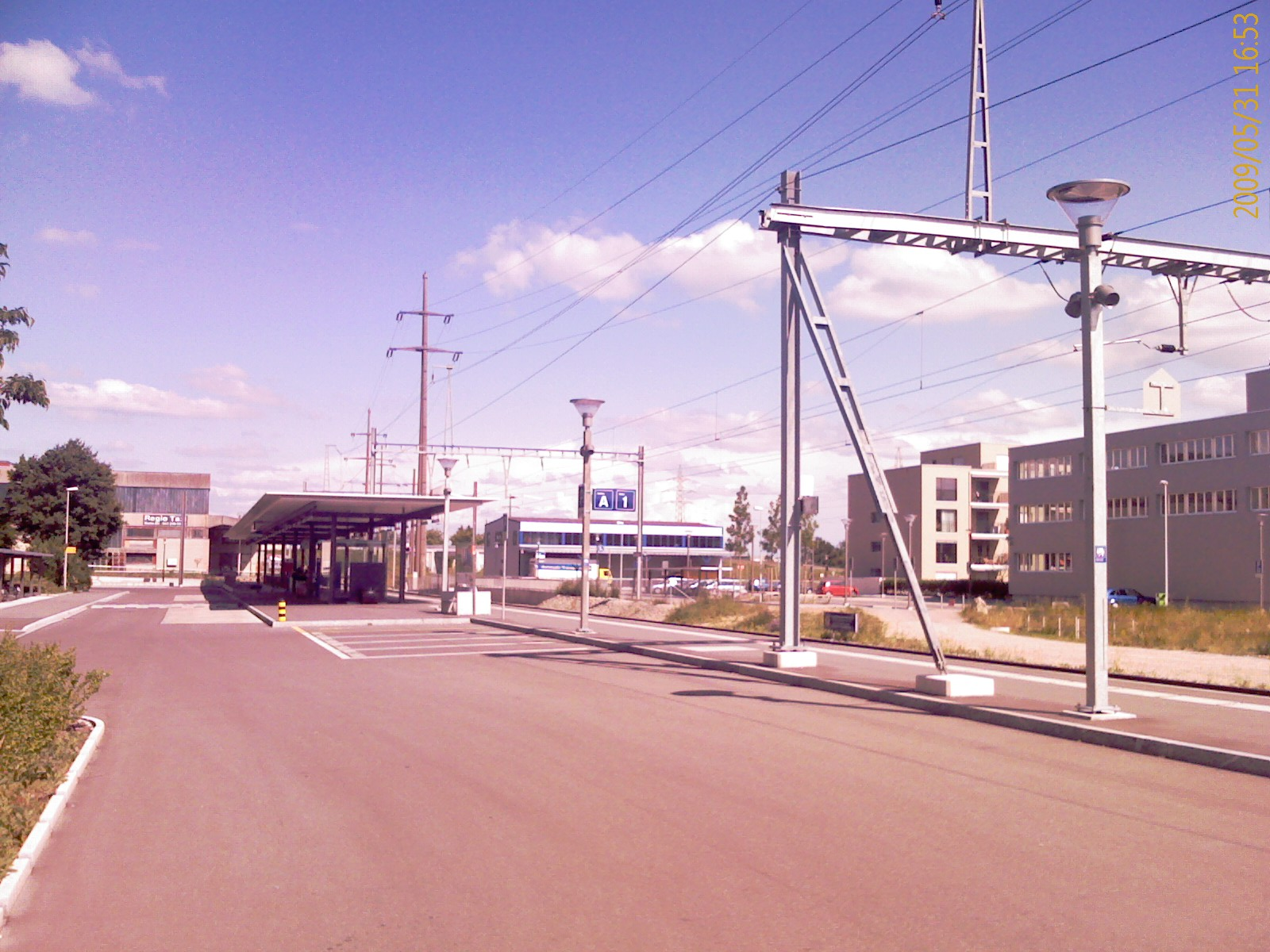
- Renewed station (2009)

General information
- Location: Bahnhofstrasse; Buchs, Zurich; Switzerland
- Coordinates: 47.453949°N 8.435225°E
- Elevation: 440 m (1,440 ft)
- Owner: Swiss Federal Railways
- Operator: Swiss Federal Railways
- Line: Wettingen-Effretikon line (Furttal line)
- Platforms: 1 side platform
- Tracks: 2
- Connections: ZVV
- Bus: VBG buses 449 455

Other information
- Fare zone: ZVV 111

Passengers
- 2018: 3,300 per weekday

Services
Preceding station	Zurich S-Bahn	Following station
Otelfingen Golfpark towards Baden	S6	Regensdorf-Watt towards Uetikon
Otelfingen towards Würenlos	SN6 Limited service	Regensdorf-Watt towards Winterthur
Location
- Location within Switzerland Location within Canton of Zürich

Buchs-Dällikon is a railway station in Switzerland. The station is situated in the municipality of Buchs, but also serves the adjacent municipality of Dällikon. Both municipalities are situated in the Furttal region in the canton of Zurich. The station is located on the Wettingen-Effretikon railway line (Furttal line), within fare zone 111 of the Zürcher Verkehrsverbund (ZVV).

== Infrastructure ==
Buchs-Dällikon station was completely renewed between 2005 and 2008, and the former station building was removed. The station is equipped with a park & rail facility (parking lot) to the south, and bicycle parkings. There are two tracks but only one side platform. The second track is used for crossing cargo trains, which use the mostly single-tracked Furttal line to bypass the city center of Zurich.

== Service ==
Buchs-Dällikon station is served by line S6 of the Zurich S-Bahn. On weekends (Friday and Saturday nights), there is a nighttime S-Bahn service (SN6) offered by ZVV.

Summary of all S-Bahn services:

- Zurich S-Bahn:
  - S6: half-hourly service to Baden, and to Uetikon via Zürich HB.
  - Nighttime S-Bahn (only during weekends):
    - SN6: hourly service to Würenlos, and to Winterthur via Zürich Stadelhofen.

The station is also served by regional bus routes of Verkehrsbetriebe Glattal (VBG).

== Former Buchs ZH railway station ==
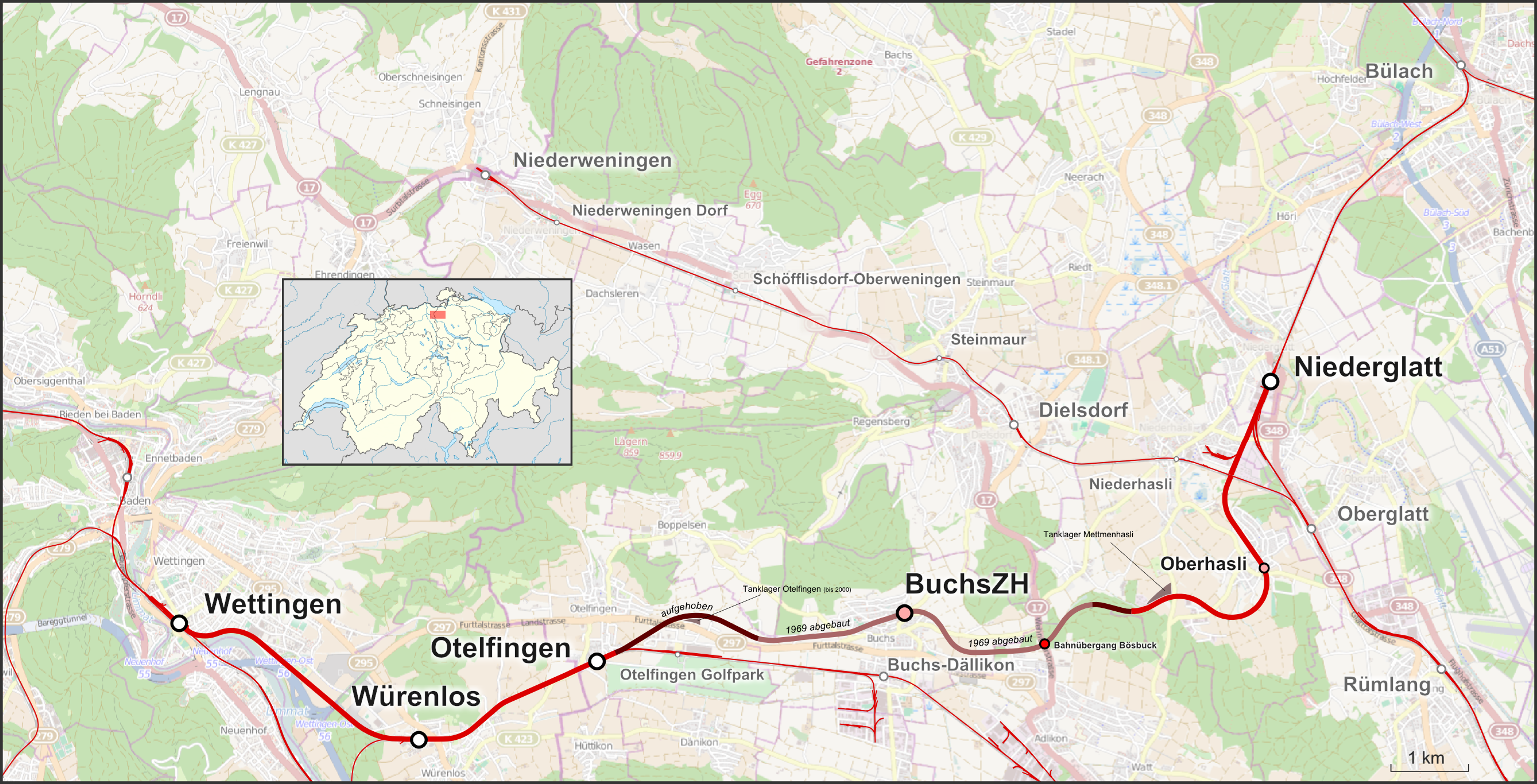
Bülach-Baden railway line

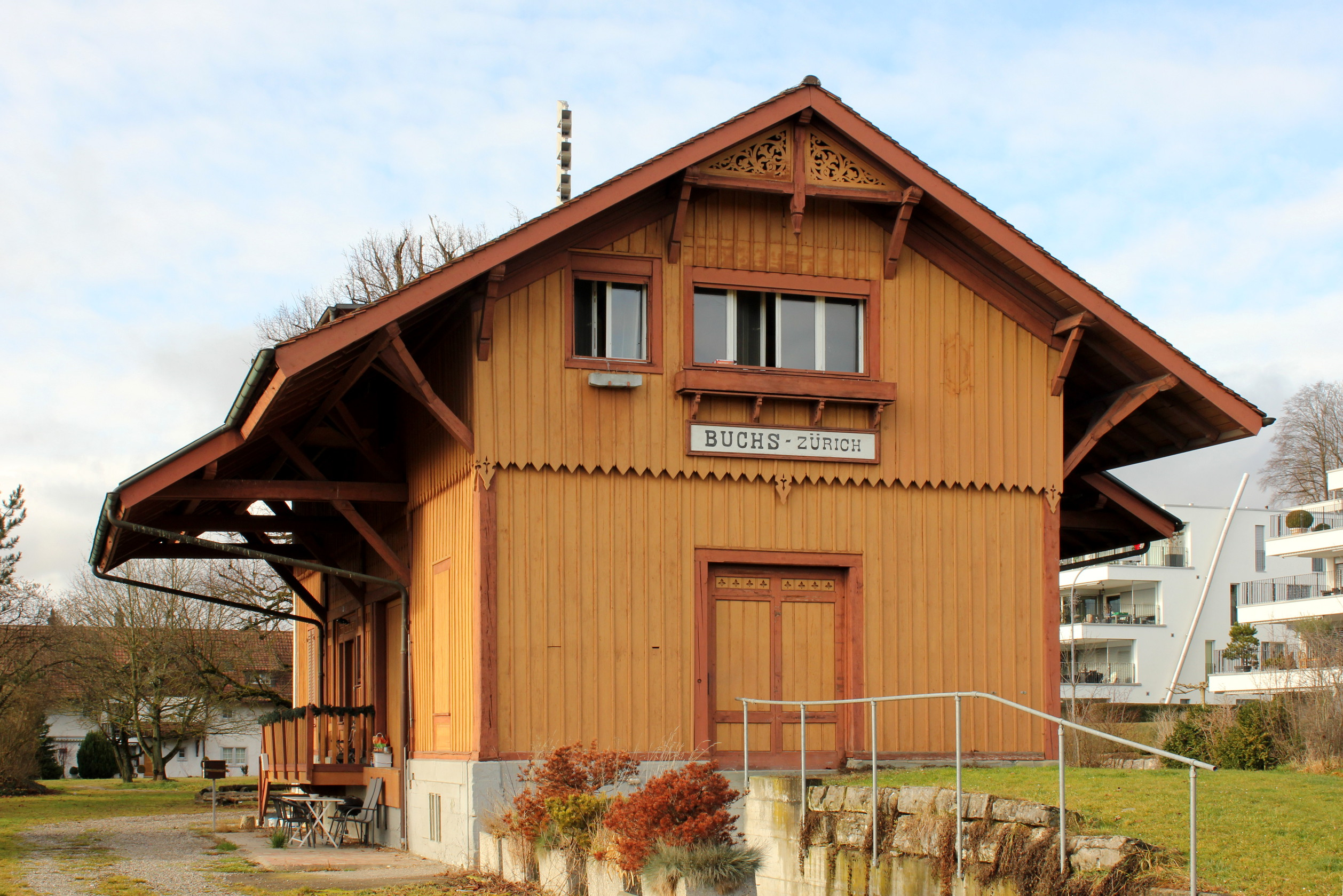
Station building of former Buchs ZH railway station (2016) on the closed Bülach-Baden line

Buchs used to have a second railway station on the Bülach-Baden railway line (Bülach-Baden-Bahn), which connected the Furttal line near Otelfingen with the Oerlikon-Bülach line in Niederglatt. Since the 1920s, the Swiss Federal Railways had plans to close this line. After 1934, the station building was unattended.The last passenger train called at this station on 17 January 1937.

The former station building in the upper part of the village remained, but the tracks have been mostly removed in 1969. A few tracks of the Bülach-Baden line remain between Otelfingen and Otelfingen Golfpark stations, and between Niederglatt and an industrial area south of Oberhasli. The tracks are used by the adjacent industry.

== See also ==
- Rail transport in Switzerland
