= Zürich Oerlikon railway station =

Railway station in Zürich, Switzerland

Zürich Oerlikon
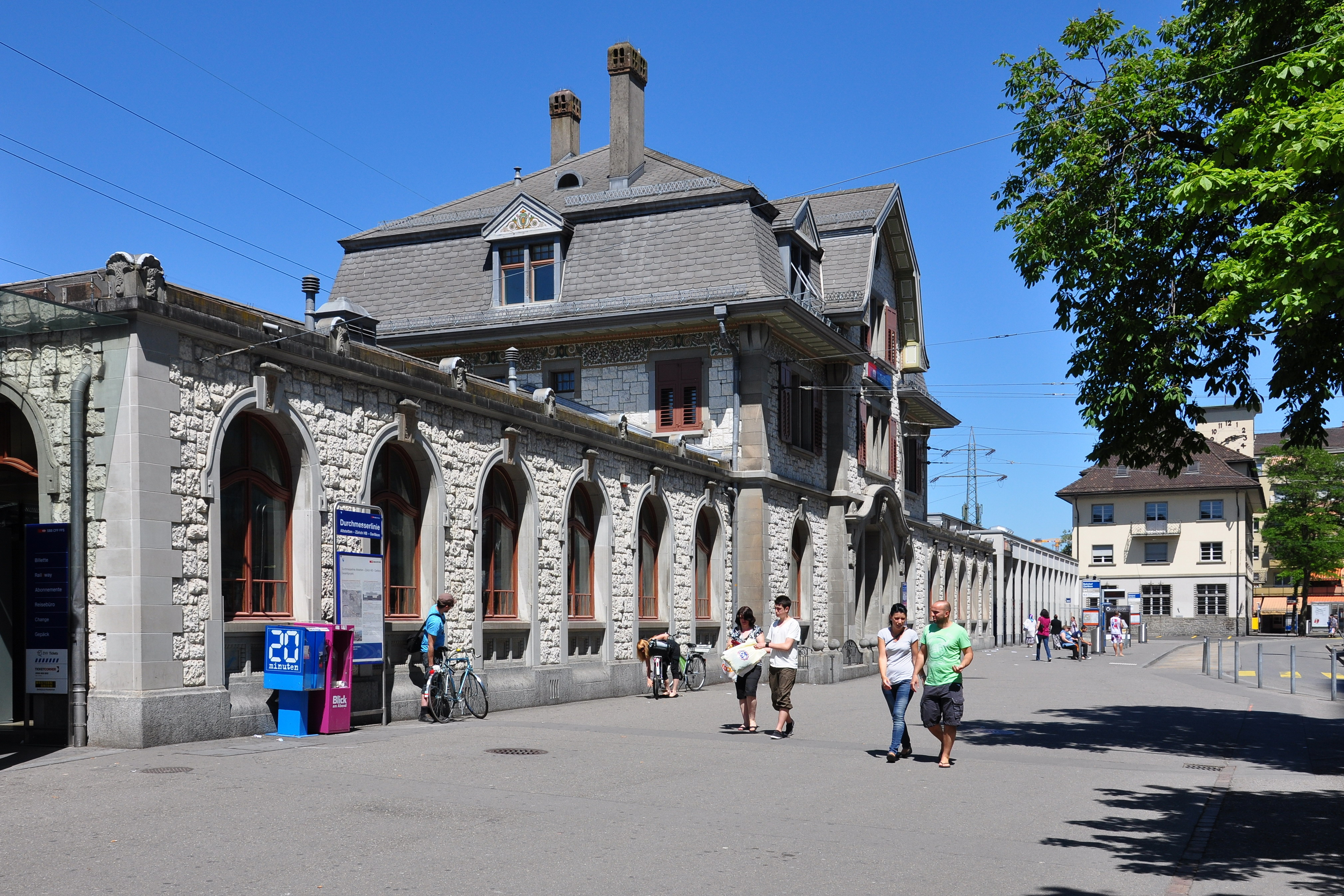
- The south-facing front of the 1914 Zürich Oerlikon station building in 2009

General information
- Location: Hofwiesenstrasse 369; Zürich; Switzerland
- Coordinates: 47°24′41″N 8°32′39″E
- Elevation: 441 m (1,447 ft)
- System: Pass-through railway station
- Owner: Swiss Federal Railways
- Lines: Oerlikon–Bülach line; Wettingen–Effretikon line; Zürich–Winterthur line
- Platforms: 5
- Tracks: 8
- Train operators: Swiss Federal Railways
- Connections: ZVV: Bhf. Oerlikon; Bhf. Oerlikon Ost; Bhf. Oerlikon Nord
- Tram: VBZ 10 50 51
- Bus: VBZ 61 62 64 75 80; Glattalbus 768 781 787
- Airport: Zurich Airport: Trains S2 S16 S24; Tram 10; Bus 768

Construction
- Architect: 1855: A. Beckh; 1865: Jakob Friedrich Wanner; 2016: 10:8 architects

Other information
- Fare zone: 110 (ZVV)

History
- Opened: 1855 (wooden goods shed); 1865 (first building)
- Rebuilt: 1912–1914 (reconstruction of station building); 2004–2016 (total reconstruction of underpasses, tracks and platforms)

Passengers
- 2025: 86,200 per day (SBB, SOB)
- Rank: 7 out of 1,095

Services
Preceding station	SBB CFF FFS	Following station
Zürich HB towards Geneva Airport	IC 1	Zürich Airport towards St. Gallen
Zürich HB Terminus	IR 13	Zürich Airport towards Sargans
Zürich HB towards Basel SBB	IR 36	Zürich Airport Terminus
Zürich HB Terminus	RE48	Bülach towards Schaffhausen
Preceding station	Zurich S-Bahn	Following station
Zürich HB towards Unterterzen	S2	Zürich Airport Terminus
Zürich Hardbrücke towards Wetzikon	S3	Glattbrugg towards Bülach
Zürich Hardbrücke towards Uetikon	S6	Zürich Seebach towards Baden
Zürich Hardbrücke towards Rapperswil	S7	Opfikon towards Winterthur
Zürich HB towards Pfäffikon SZ	S8	Wallisellen towards Winterthur
Zürich Hardbrücke towards Uster	S9	Glattbrugg towards Schaffhausen
Zürich HB towards Affoltern am Albis	S14	Wallisellen towards Hinwil
Zürich Hardbrücke towards Rapperswil	S15	Glattbrugg towards Niederweningen
Zürich Hardbrücke towards Herrliberg-Feldmeilen	S16	Zürich Airport Terminus
Zürich HB towards Koblenz	S19	Wallisellen towards Pfäffikon ZH
Zürich Hardbrücke towards Zürich HB	S21	Zürich Affoltern towards Regensdorf-Watt
Zürich Wipkingen towards Zug	S24	Zürich Airport towards Thayngen or Weinfelden
Night services
Zürich Seebach towards Würenlos	SN6 Limited service	Zürich Hardbrücke towards Winterthur
Opfikon towards Bassersdorf	SN7 Limited service	Zürich Hardbrücke towards Stäfa
Glattbrugg towards Bülach	SN9 Limited service	Zürich Hardbrücke towards Uster
Zürich HB towards Lachen	SN8 Limited service	Wallisellen towards Pfäffikon ZH
Location
- Location within Switzerland Location within Canton of Zürich

Zürich Oerlikon railway station (German: Bahnhof Zürich Oerlikon) is a railway station located in District 11 of Zurich and within fare zone 110 of the Zürcher Verkehrsverbund (ZVV). It is one of the two major nodes for local and regional public transportation in the northern part of Zürich, the other being the railway station at Zurich Airport. Oerlikon station is a junction station, or Keilbahnhof: tracks 1 and 2 are on the Zürich–Winterthur line, while tracks 3–8 are on the Oerlikon–Bülach line. The station building, located at the side of the station, is listed in the Swiss inventory of cultural property of national and regional significance as a Class B object of regional importance.

Eleven regional train lines of the Zürich S-Bahn serve the station, as do several InterCity, InterRegio and RegioExpress lines. Serving approximately 85,000 daily rail passengers, Zürich Oerlikon is the seventh busiest railway station in Switzerland. It is also served by three tramway and nine local bus lines.

The station is in the centre of Oerlikon with dedicated shopping areas to its south, the redeveloped former Maschinenfabrik Oerlikon to its north, and the Leutschenbach business quarter and Hallenstadion indoor arena to the east. Three tall buildings surround the station: Andreasturm, Franklinturm and Oerlikon One (former Swissôtel).

== History ==
On 27 December 1855 the line from Oerlikon to Winterthur via Wallisellen station was established by the Schweizerische Nordostbahn (NOB), and a temporary wooden railway station was built by A. Beckh and Jakob Friedrich Wanner. The following year the line was extended to Zürich Hauptbahnhof through the Wipkingen Tunnel. Lines from Wallisellen to Uster (1856) and Oerlikon to Bülach via Glattbrugg station (1865) followed. The opening of these lines triggered the industrialisation of Oerlikon, and a massive population growth. In particular the large works of Maschinenfabrik Oerlikon was established immediately to the west of the station.

In 1865, the wooden railway station was replaced by a stone building. In 1877, the Schweizerische Nationalbahn (SNB) opened the Furttal railway line from Wettingen to Effretikon, via Seebach and Opfikon stations. This line was conceived as a freight bypass for Zürich and whilst it passed close to Oerlikon station, it did not serve it. In 1878 the SNB became insolvent, and was taken over by the NOB. In 1881, a link between the Oerlikon to Bülach line and the Furttal line was constructed to allow trains to run from Oerlikon to Opfikon, and in 1909 a curve was added to also allow trains to run from Oerlikon to Seebach. In 1912, the current station building replaced that of 1865.

In June 1969 the Käferberg Tunnel was opened, providing a second route to Hauptbahnhof. In October 1979 the line from Oerlikon under Zurich Airport and on to rejoin the main line to Winterthur at Bassersdorf (the Flughafenlinie) opened, including a new station directly under the airport terminal. In June 2014, the Weinberg Tunnel opened, providing a third route to Hauptbahnhof.

To complement the opening of the Weinberg tunnel, the station's infrastructure was renewed, with the provision of two additional platform tracks and the rebuilding of the station's bus and tram stops. The additional platforms and tracks were constructed on the north-western side of the station, partially on land occupied by the former office building of Maschinenfabrik Oerlikon, dating from the late 19th century and now a restaurant complex known as Gleis 9. Because of its cultural importance to the region, plans to demolish the building were rejected, and instead the 6,200-tonne (6,800-ton) building was moved 60 metres (200 ft) to the west on specially laid tracks. The move took place in May 2012 and took 19 hours.

== Layout and facilities ==
The station is aligned on a south-west to north-east axis, and, following its expansion, has eight through platform tracks serving two side platforms and three island platforms. At the centre of the station the platforms are at or about street level, but the slope of the land means they are significantly above street level at the north-eastern end of the station, whilst the south-western approaches descend into a cutting and, eventually, tunnels. There are station entrances on both sides of the station, but the main station buildings are on the south-eastern side of the station, the same side as the centre of the suburb of Oerlikon. Pedestrian subways link both sides of the station and all platforms.

To the south-west of Oerlikon station, the line through the station divides into three lines, with fly-overs and dive-unders providing non-conflicting access routes to and from the different lines. The three lines all link to Zürich Hauptbahnhof by different tunnels through the intermediate ridge, these being the Wipkingen Tunnel, the Käferberg Tunnel and the Weinberg Tunnel. The first two of these approach the Hauptbahnhof from the west, giving access to both its upper level terminal platforms and its low level through platforms, whilst the Weinberg Tunnel enters the low level through platforms from the east.

To the north-east of Oerlikon station, the line divides into two within the station limits (keilbahnhof). The south-easternmost two platform tracks serve the line to Wallisellen station and beyond. The remaining platform tracks run together for further, but eventually divide to serve the routes to Seebach, Glattbrugg, Opfikon and Zurich Airport stations respectively.

The renovation of the station underpasses, completed in 2016, added more than 20 store fronts to the Bahnhof Oerlikon complex mostly below ground level. Prior to 2016, only two food vendors and one store were located on the station grounds itself. In Switzerland, the law requires that most stores close on Sundays; however, stores located in airports and railways are exempt, allowing the stores in Bahnhof Oerlikon to remain open year-round.

== Operation ==
=== Train ===
The station is an important and busy one. It is served by lines S2, S3, S6, S7, S8, S9, S14, S15, S16, S19, S21, and S24 of the Zürich S-Bahn. It is also called at by trains on the InterRegio (IR) lines from Zurich Airport to Basel SBB and Zurich Airport to Luzern, and the RegioExpress (RE) line from Zürich to Schaffhausen.

Train connections to Oerlikon from Zürich Hauptbahnhof are very frequent, and the ride takes only a few minutes. All trains stopping at Oerlikon also serve Hauptbahnhof providing, for most of the day, more than 20 trains per hour (tph) in each direction.

As of the December 2023 timetable change, the following services stop at Zürich Oerlikon:

- InterCity: hourly service between Geneva Airport and St. Gallen.
- InterRegio /: two trains per hour to Zürich Hauptbahnhof and Zürich Airport; hourly service to Basel SBB and Sargans.
- RegioExpress RE48: hourly service between Zürich Hauptbahnhof and Schaffhausen.
- Zürich S-Bahn:
  - S2: half-hourly service between Ziegelbrücke and Zürich Airport.
  - S3: rush-hour service between Bülach and Wetzikon.
  - S6 / S7: four trains per hour to Uetikon and half-hourly service to Baden, Rapperswil, and Winterthur.
  - S8: half-hourly service between Pfäffikon SZ and Winterthur.
  - S9 / S15: service every fifteen minutes between Oberglatt and Uster and every half-hour to Niederweningen, Schaffhausen, and Rapperswil.
  - S14: half-hourly service between Affoltern am Albis and Hinwil.
  - S16 / S6: service every fifteen minutes to Herrliberg-Feldmeilen and every half-hour to Zürich Airport.
  - S19: half-hourly service between Dietikon and Effretikon; rush-hour service between Koblenz and Pfäffikon ZH.
  - S21: rush-hour service between Regensdorf-Watt and Zürich Hauptbahnhof.
  - S24: half-hourly service between Zürich Wipkingen and Winterthur; hourly service to Weinfelden and Thayngen.

During weekends, there are also four nighttime S-Bahn services (SN6, SN7, SN8, SN9) offered by ZVV:

- SN6: hourly service between Würenlos and Winterthur via Zürich HB.
- SN7: hourly service between Bassersdorf and Stäfa via Zürich HB.
- SN8: hourly service between Pfäffikon ZH and Lachen via Zürich HB.
- SN9: hourly service between Bülach and Uster via Zürich HB.

=== Tram/Bus ===
Trams of both the Zürich tramway system and the Glattalbahn operate from a number of stops adjacent to both sides of the station, as do buses of both the Verkehrsbetriebe Zürich (VBZ) and Glattalbus (VBG). A stop complex on the south-eastern side of the station and known as Bahnhof Oerlikon is served by tram route 50, and buses 61, 62, 94, 768, 781 and 787. A second stop complex to the north-east of the station and known as Bahnhof Oerlikon Ost is served by tram routes 10 and 51, and buses 75, 768, 781 and 787. A third stop complex to the north-west of the station and known as Bahnhof Oerlikon Nord is served by buses 64 and 80. Between them these connect the station to much of the city of Zürich and to the Glatt Valley between Oerlikon and Zurich Airport.

Summary of tram and bus services:

- Bahnhof Oerlikon to the south next to the station building, via both western and eastern underpass, VBZ tram line 50, VBZ bus lines 61, 62, and Glattalbus lines 768, 781 and 787
- Bahnhof Oerlikon Ost to the east via the eastern underpass, VBZ/Glattalbahn tram lines 10 and 51, VBZ bus line 75, and Glattalbus lines 768, 781 and 787
- Bahnhof Oerlikon Nord to the north, via the western underpass, VBZ bus lines 64 and 80

== See also ==
- History of rail transport in Switzerland
- List of railway stations in Zurich
- Public transport in Zurich
- Rail transport in Switzerland
