= S21 (ZVV) =

Railway service in Switzerland

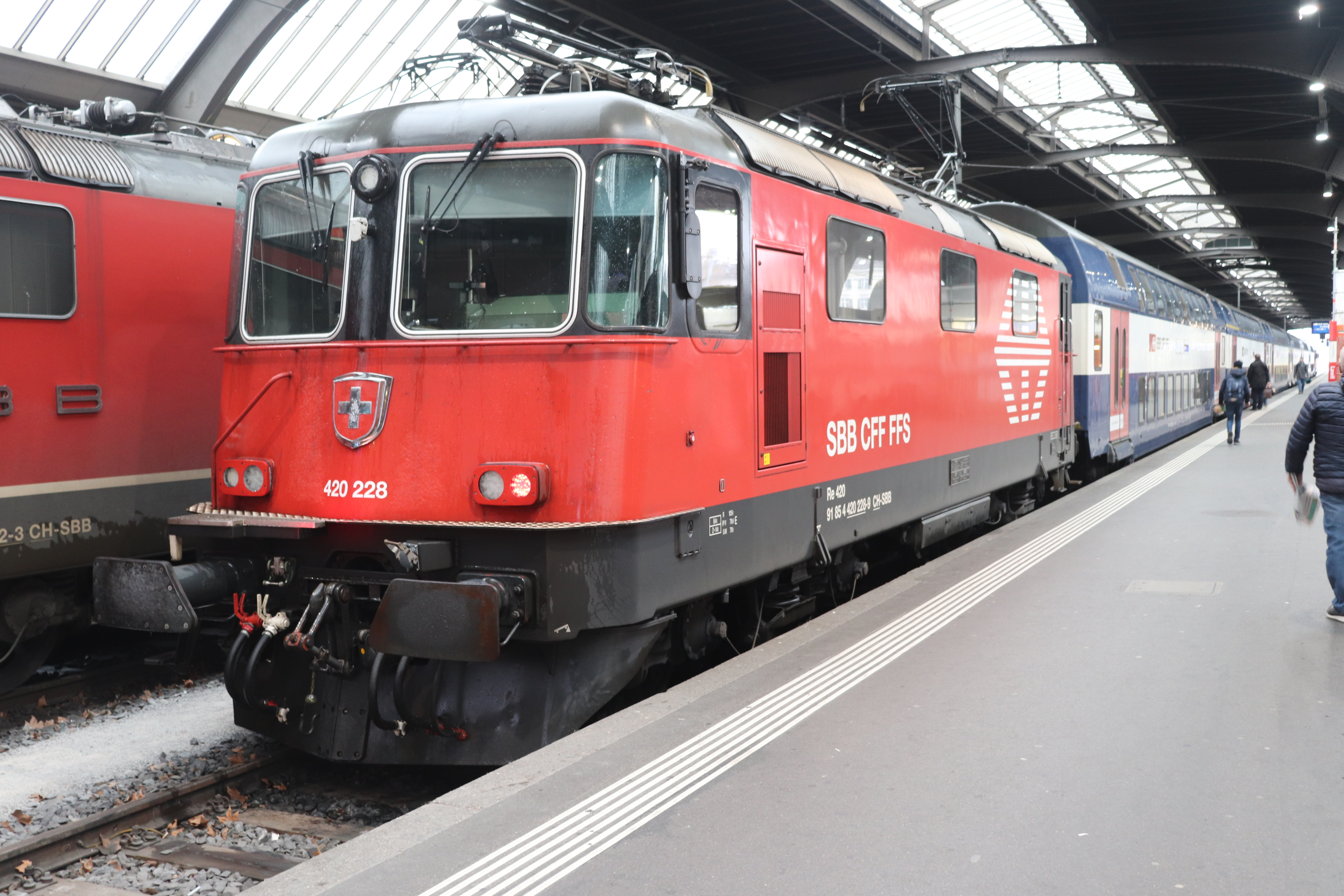
- Trainset at Zürich HB

Overview
- Locale: Zürich, Switzerland
- Termini: Zürich Hauptbahnhof; Regensdorf-Watt
- Stations: 4 or 5

Service
- Type: S-Bahn
- System: Zürich S-Bahn
- Operator(s): Zürcher Verkehrsverbund (ZVV)
- Rolling stock: Re 450 and double-decker coaches; Re 420 (LION) locomotives and double-decker coaches

History
- Opened: 13 December 2015

Technical
- Track gauge: 1,435 mm (4 ft 8 1/2 in) standard gauge

Zürich S-Bahn network as of December 2018

The S21 is a regional railway service of the Zürich S-Bahn of the Zürcher Verkehrsverbund (ZVV). The service operates at peak hours between Regensdorf-Watt and Zürich Hauptbahnhof over the Wettingen–Effretikon railway, supplementing the regular S6 service, which continues west to Baden.

At Zürich HB, trains of the S21 service usually depart from ground-level track (Gleis) 18.

== Route ==
- S21 Regensdorf-Watt–Hardbrücke–Zürich HB
  Operates only during rush hour; non-stop between Oerlikon and Regensdorf-Watt; morning services to Zürich HB and evening services to Regensdorf-Wall also stop in Zürich Affoltern.

The service operates on weekdays during peak hours, roughly from 6:30 am to 8:30 am and from 4:30 pm to 7 pm; there are a total of eight trains in each direction per day. In the morning only inbound trains stop at Zürich Affoltern, in the evening only outbound trains. Trains usually depart from (or arrive at) one of the surface platforms of Zürich HB. By being overlapped with S6, services between Zürich Hauptbahnhof and Regensdorf-Watt operate with a headway of roughly 10 or 20 minutes respectively. The S21 calls at the following stations:

- Zürich Hauptbahnhof
- Zürich Hardbrücke
- Zürich Oerlikon
- (Zürich Affoltern)
- Regensdorf-Watt

== History ==
The S21 designation was previously used for service from Zürich to Zug over the Thalwil–Arth-Goldau railway; this is now provided by the S24. The current S21 began running with the December 2015 timetable change.

== Rolling stock ==
As of the December 2022 timetable change, most services are operated by Re 450 class locomotives pushing or pulling double-deck passenger carriages.

== See also ==
- Rail transport in Switzerland
- List of railway stations in Zurich
- Public transport in Zurich
- ZVV fare zones
