= Zurich Hardbrücke railway station =

Railway station in Zürich, Switzerland

Zürich Hardbrücke
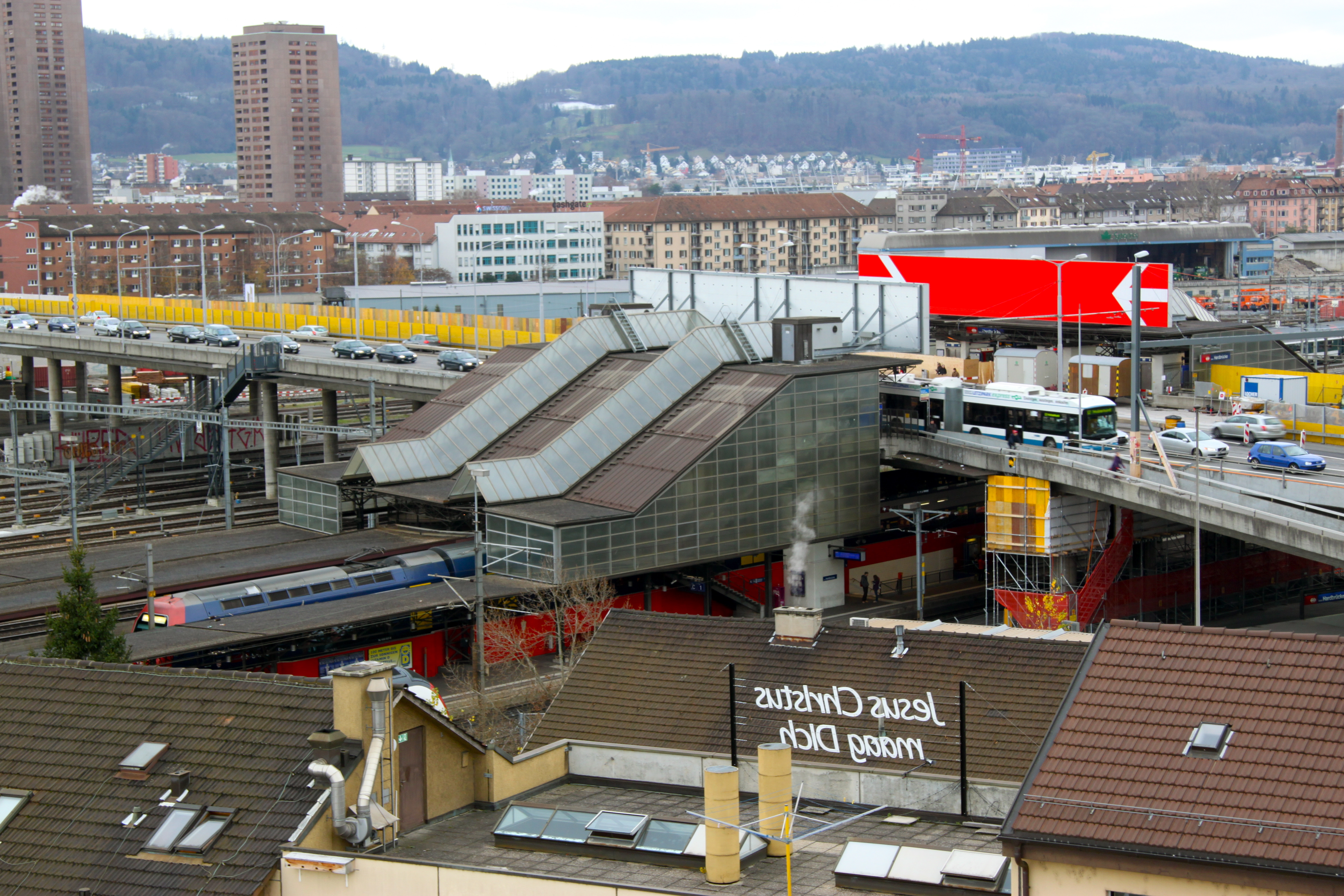
- Zürich Hardbrücke station before it was rebuilt in 2017

General information
- Location: Hardbrücke; CH-8004/5 Zürich; Switzerland
- Coordinates: 47°23′06″N 8°31′01″E
- Elevation: 406 m (1,332 ft)
- System: Central pass-through railway station
- Owner: Swiss Federal Railways
- Lines: Zürich–Baden railway line; Zurich–Winterthur railway line (the Käferberg tunnel variant)
- Platforms: 1 island platform; 2 side platforms
- Tracks: 5
- Train operators: Swiss Federal Railways
- Connections: ZVV: Bhf. Hardbrücke
- Tram: VBZ tram 8
- Trolleybus: VBZ 33 72
- Bus: VBZ 83
- Airport: A direct S-Bahn line S16 every half an hour to/from Zürich Airport in 0:11h and several other connections with one change

Other information
- Fare zone: 110 (ZVV)
- Website: Bahnhof Zürich Hardbrücke

History
- Opened: 1982
- Rebuilt: 1990, 2017

Passengers
- 2025: 52,900 per day (SBB)
- Rank: 12 out of 1,095
Services
Preceding station	Zurich S-Bahn	Following station
Zürich Oerlikon towards Bülach	S3	Zürich HB towards Wetzikon
Zürich Altstetten towards Zug	S5	Zürich HB towards Pfäffikon SZ
Zürich Oerlikon towards Baden	S6	Zürich HB towards Uetikon
Zürich Oerlikon towards Winterthur	S7	Zürich HB towards Rapperswil
Zürich Oerlikon towards Schaffhausen	S9	Zürich HB towards Uster
Zürich Altstetten towards Aarau	S11	Zürich HB towards Seuzach or Wila
Zürich Altstetten towards Brugg AG	S12	Zürich HB towards Schaffhausen or Wil
Zürich Oerlikon towards Niederweningen	S15	Zürich HB towards Rapperswil
Zürich Oerlikon towards Zurich Airport	S16	Zürich HB towards Herrliberg-Feldmeilen
Terminus	S20	Zürich HB towards Uerikon
Zürich Oerlikon towards Regensdorf-Watt	S21	Zürich HB Terminus
Zürich Altstetten towards Aarau	SN1 Limited service	Zürich HB towards Winterthur
Zürich Altstetten towards Knonau	SN5 Limited service	Zürich HB towards Pfäffikon SZ
Zürich Oerlikon towards Würenlos	SN6 Limited service	Zürich HB towards Winterthur
Zürich Oerlikon towards Bassersdorf	SN7 Limited service	Zürich HB towards Stäfa
Zürich Oerlikon towards Bülach	SN9 Limited service	Zürich HB towards Uster
Zürich Altstetten towards Olten	SN11 Limited service	Zürich HB towards Winterthur
Location

Zurich Hardbrücke railway station (German: Bahnhof Zürich Hardbrücke) is a railway station in the central part of the Swiss city of Zürich. It is situated below Hardbrücke, a road bridge that lends its name to the station. Hardbrücke station is only 1.9 kilometres (1.2 miles) away from Zürich HB (main station) and situated near the business and entertainment district Zürich West, next to the Prime Tower. It lies within fare zone 110 of the Zürcher Verkehrsverbund (ZVV).

== History ==
The station was opened in 1982, with the provision of platforms on the line to Zürich Oerlikon (via Käferberg Tunnel). In 1990, in line with the introduction of the S-Bahn scheme, it was expanded to include platforms on the line to Zürich Altstetten. In conjunction with the extension of tram route 8 from Hardplatz over Hardbrücke to Hardturm in 2017, the station was partly rebuilt and platforms 2 and 3 were renewed.

== Layout and facilities ==
The station sits in the approach to Zürich Hauptbahnhof (Zürich HB), Zürich's main station, on the Zürich–Baden line near its junction with the Käferberg Tunnel variant of the Zürich–Winterthur line, and to the north of the through tracks that carry long-distance passenger and occasional freight trains. It lies below the Hardbrücke, a road bridge that crosses the rail tracks and forms an important north–south connection within the city. The station has two side platforms and a central island platform served by four tracks, with the two inner tracks on the line to Zürich Oerlikon via the Käferberg Tunnel, and the two outer tracks on the line to Zürich Altstetten. The line to Oerlikon is sloped and at a higher level, and thus the platforms are not all at the same level.

Access to the station's platforms is either from the Hardbrücke bridge or an underpass. The bridge has station entrances and exits on either side, with separate access to and from all platforms. The entrance to the underpass is to the north of the station, below the bridge and adjacent to the bicycle and car parking. Access to all platforms from both the bridge and the underpass is through stairs and elevators. The station's underpass has a kiosk and a small supermarket.

The station is connected to the municipal tram and bus network. Zürich trolleybus routes 33, 72 and Zürich bus route 83, and since December 2017 tram route 8 serve the adjacent stop above on the bridge, called Bahnhof Hardbrücke. All routes are operated by VBZ.

== Operation ==
The station is a major node in the Zürich S-Bahn system. It is served by eleven regional railway lines of this S-Bahn system: S3, S5, S6, S7, S9, S11, S12, S15, S16, S20, and S21. Eastward, all trains from Hardbrücke station operate via low-level platforms 41–44 at Hauptbahnhof, continuing to Stadelhofen station through the Hirschengraben Tunnel. They provide, for most of the day, 16 trains per hour (tph) to or from both of these two inner-city stations. In westward direction, trains continue to Zürich Oerlikon and Zürich Altstetten, respectively.

Other stations served include:

- Aarau (S11; 2 tph)
- Affoltern am Albis (S5; 2 tph)
- Altstetten (S5 / S11 / S12; 6 tph)
- Baden (S6 / S12; 4 tph)
- Brugg AG (S12; 2 tph)
- Bülach (S9; 2 tph; rush hour: S3 +2 tph)
- Dietikon (S11 / S12; 4 tph)
- Effretikon (S3 / S7; 4 tph)
- Herrliberg-Feldmeilen (S6 / S16; 4 tph)
- Meilen (S6 / S7; 4 tph; rush hour: S20 +1 tph)
- Niederweningen (S15; 2 tph)
- Oerlikon (S6 / S7 / S9 / S15 / S16; 10 tph; rush hour: S21 +1 tph)
- Rafz (S9; 2 tph)
- Rapperswil (S5 / S7 / S15; 6 tph)
- Schaffhausen and Rhine Falls (S9 / S12; 2 tph)
- Uster (S5 / S9 / S15, 6 tph)
- Wetzikon (S3 / S5 / S15; 6 tph)
- Winterthur (S7 / S11 / S12, 6 tph)
- Zug (S5; 2 tph)
- Zürich Airport (S16; 2 tph)

=== Services ===
Summary of all regional train services by Zürich S-Bahn at Zürich Hardbrücke:

- S3 (Bülach–) Hardbrücke–Zürich HB–Effretikon–Wetzikon
  Extended from Hardbrücke to Bülach during rush hour, operating non-stop from Glattbrugg.
- S5 Zug–Affoltern am Albis–Zürich HB–Uster–Wetzikon–Rapperswil–Pfäffikon SZ
  Stops between Stadelhofen and Wetzikon only in Uster.
- S6 Baden AG–Regensdorf-Watt–Hardbrücke–Zürich HB–Uetikon
- S7 Winterthur–Kloten–Hardbrücke–Zürich HB–Meilen–Rapperswil
  Operates non stop between Stadelhofen and Meilen, Winterthur and Effretikon, stops in Kemptthal as of 9:20 PM.
- S9 (Schaffhausen–) Rafz–Hardbrücke–Zürich HB–Uster
  Operates every 30 minutes between Schaffhausen and Rafz only during rush hour, otherwise every hours.
- S11 Aarau–Lenzburg–Dietikon–Zürich HB–Zürich Stettbach–Winterthur–Seuzach/Sennhof-Kyburg (–Wila)
  Operates non stop between Stettbach and Winterthur; the lines to Seuzach and Sennhof-Kyburg are operated alternately at hourly intervals; supplementary trains to Wila.
- S12 Brugg AG–Zürich HB–Zürich Stettbach– Winterthur–Schaffhausen/Wil SG
  Operates non stop between Stettbach and Winterthur; the lines to Schaffhausen and Wil SG are operated alternately at hourly intervals.
- S15 Niederweningen–Hardbrücke–Zürich HB–Uster–Wetzikon–Rapperswil
  Stops between Stadelhofen and Wetzikon only in Uster.
- S16 Zürich Flughafen –Hardbrücke–Zürich HB–Herrliberg-Feldmeilen (–Meilen)
  Extended in the evening to Meilen.
- S20 Uerikon–Zürich HB–Hardbrücke
  Operates only during rush hour; stops between Männedorf and Stadelhofen only in Meilen and Küsnacht ZH.
- S21 Regensdorf-Watt–Hardbrücke–Zürich HB
  Operates only during rush hour; non-stop between Oerlikon and Regensdorf-Watt; morning services to Zürich HB and evening services to Regensdorf-Wall also stop in Zürich Affoltern.

During weekends, there are six nighttime S-Bahn services (SN1, SN5, SN6, SN7, SN9, SN11) calling at Hardbrücke station, offered by ZVV:

- SN1: hourly service between Aarau and Winterthur via Zürich HB.
- SN5: hourly service between Knonau and Pfäffikon SZ via Zürich HB.
- SN6: hourly service between Würenlos and Winterthur via Zürich HB.
- SN7: hourly service between Bassersdorf and Stäfa via Zürich HB.
- SN9: hourly service between Bülach and Uster via Zürich HB.
- SN11: hourly service between Winterthur and Olten.

== See also ==
- List of railway stations in Zurich
- Public transport in Zurich
- Rail transport in Switzerland
