= Regensdorf-Watt railway station =

Railway station in Canton of Zürich, Switzerland

Regensdorf-Watt
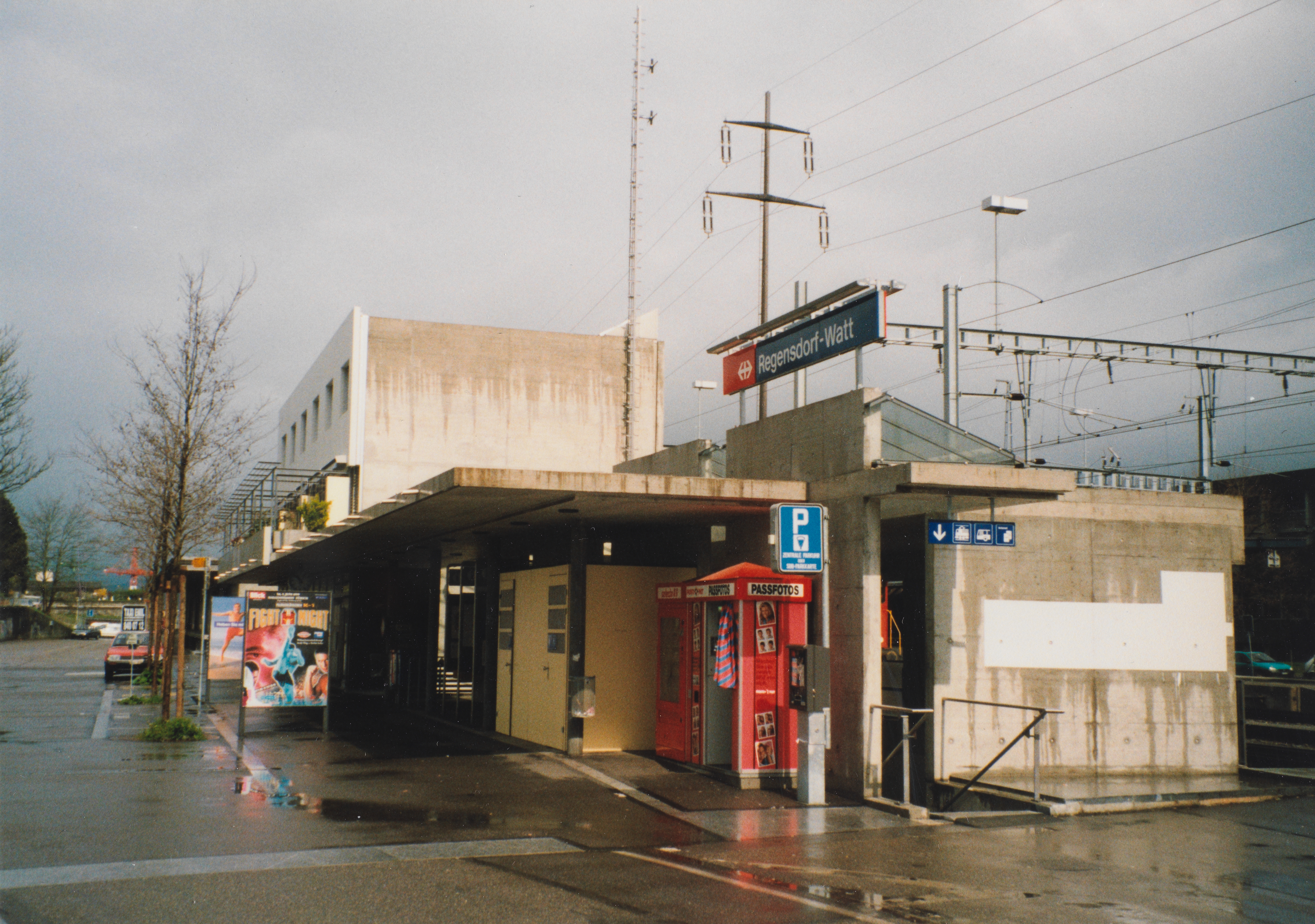
- Station building in 1999

General information
- Location: Stationsstrasse; Regensdorf, Zurich; Switzerland
- Coordinates: 47.436818°N 8.472079°E
- Elevation: 442 m (1,450 ft)
- Owner: Swiss Federal Railways
- Operator: Swiss Federal Railways
- Line: Wettingen-Effretikon line (Furttal line)
- Platforms: 1 island platform
- Connections: ZVV
- Bus: VBG bus routes 451 452 453 454 456 485 491

Other information
- Fare zone: ZVV 111

Passengers
- 2018: 8,100 per weekday

Services
Preceding station	Zurich S-Bahn	Following station
Buchs-Dällikon towards Baden	S6	Zürich Affoltern towards Uetikon
Terminus	S21	Zürich Affoltern towards Zürich HB
Buchs-Dällikon towards Würenlos	SN6 Limited service	Zürich Affoltern towards Winterthur
Location
- Location within Switzerland

Regensdorf-Watt is a railway station in Switzerland, situated in the municipality of Regensdorf. The station is located between the towns of Regensdorf and Watt on the Wettingen-Effretikon railway line (Furttal line), within fare zone 111 of the Zürcher Verkehrsverbund (ZVV).

== Services ==
The station is a stop on the Zurich S-Bahn system. It is served by line S6 and the peak hour-only S21 service, which terminates here. The S21 runs non-stop from Zürich Oerlikon, with limited services calling also at Zürich Affoltern. On weekends, there is a nighttime S-Bahn service (SN6) offered by Zürcher Verkehrsverbund (ZVV).

Summary of all S-Bahn services:

- Zurich S-Bahn:
  - S6: half-hourly service to Baden, and to Uetikon via Zürich HB.
  - S21: half-hourly service to Zürich HB via Zürich Hardbrücke.
  - Nighttime S-Bahn (only during weekends):
    - SN6: hourly service to Würenlos, and to Winterthur via Zürich Stadelhofen.

The station is an important hub in the Furttal for regional buses of Verkehrsbetriebe Glattal (VBG).

== See also ==
- Rail transport in Switzerland
