= S6 (ZVV) =

Railway service in Switzerland

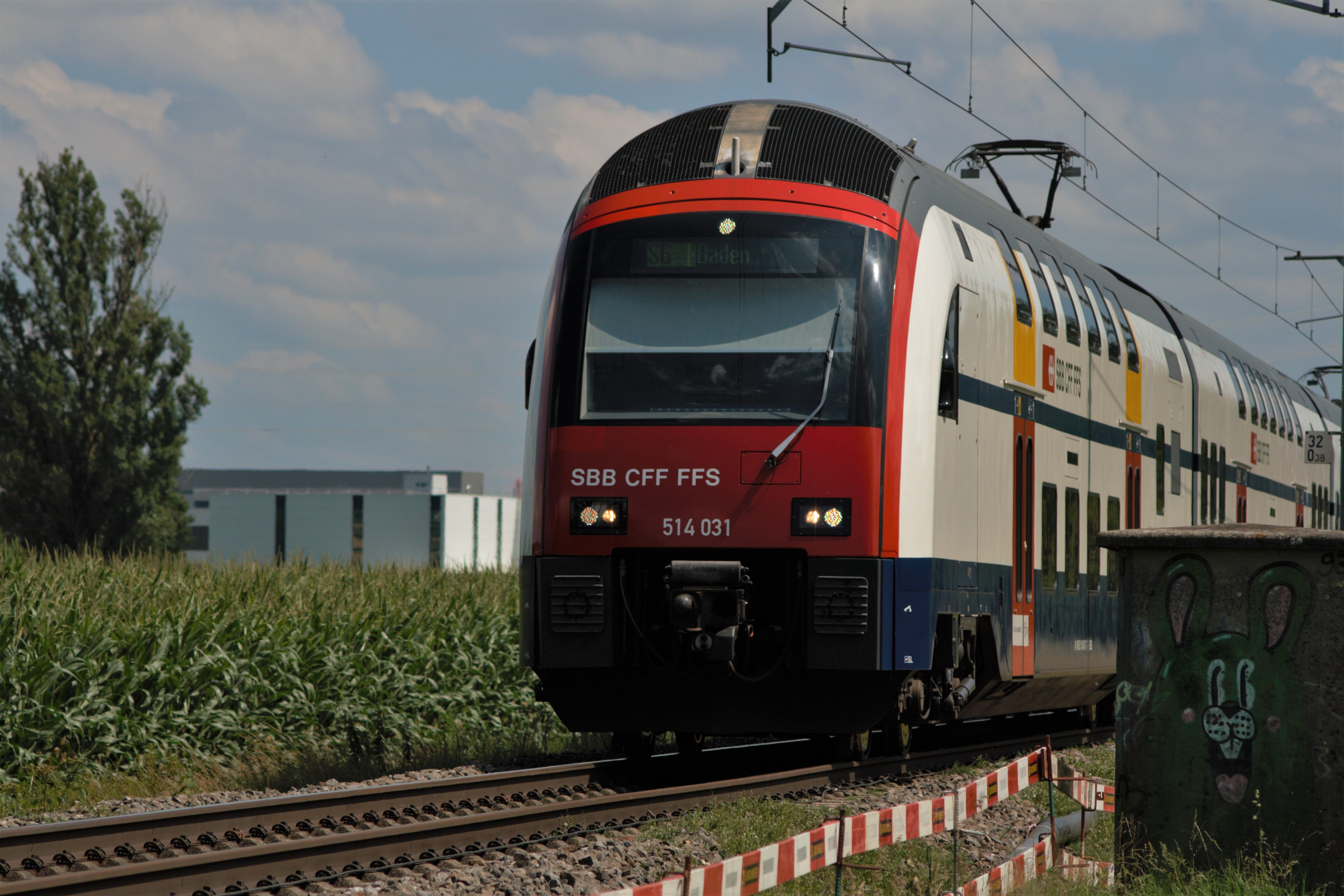
- SBB RABe 514 "DTZ" as S6 service

Overview
- Status: Operational
- Locale: Zürich, Switzerland
- Termini: Baden; Uetikon am See
- Stations: 22
- Website: ZVV (in English)

Service
- Type: S-Bahn service
- System: Zürich S-Bahn
- Operator(s): Zürcher Verkehrsverbund (ZVV)
- Rolling stock: RABe 514 class and RABe 511 class

Technical
- Track gauge: 1,435 mm (4 ft 8 1/2 in)

Zürich S-Bahn network as of December 2018

The S6 is a regional railway service of the S-Bahn Zürich on the Zürcher Verkehrsverbund (ZVV), Zürich transportation network, and is one of the network's services connecting the cantons of Zürich and Aargau.

At Zürich HB, trains of the S6 service depart from underground tracks (Gleis) 41–44 (Museumstrasse station).

== Route ==
- S6 Baden AG–Regensdorf-Watt–Hardbrücke–Zürich HB–Uetikon

The service links Baden, in the canton of Aargau to the west of Zürich, and Uetikon, on north shore of Lake Zürich to the east of Zürich. From Baden it runs via the Furttal railway and Regensdorf-Watt to Zürich Oerlikon, and then serves Zurich Hauptbahnhof and Zürich Stadelhofen before running over the Lake Zürich right-bank railway line to its terminus.

The following stations are served:

- Baden
- Wettingen
- Würenlos
- Otelfingen
- Otelfingen Golfpark
- Buchs-Dällikon
- Regensdorf-Watt
- Zürich Affoltern
- Zürich Seebach
- Zürich Oerlikon
- Zürich Hardbrücke
- Zürich Hauptbahnhof
- Zürich Stadelhofen
- Zürich Tiefenbrunnen
- Zollikon
- Küsnacht Goldbach
- Küsnacht ZH
- Erlenbach ZH
- Winkel am Zürichsee
- Herrliberg-Feldmeilen
- Meilen
- Uetikon

=== Route ===
Zurich S6

== Rolling stock ==
As of the December 2022 timetable change, most services are operated with RABe 514 class trains; some operate with the RABe 511 class.

== Scheduling ==
The normal frequency over the length of the service is one train every 30 minutes. Between Zürich Oerlikon and Herrliberg-Feldmeilen, the S6 combines with the S16 to provide a frequency of one train every 15 minutes. The eastern end of the service is cut back to Tiefenbrunnen in the evening, whilst on weekdays four trains during the middle of the day start and terminate at Wettingen.

A journey over the full length of the service takes 66 or 67 minutes, depending on direction.

== See also ==
- Rail transport in Switzerland
- List of railway stations in Zurich
- Public transport in Zurich
- ZVV fare zones
- A-Welle tariff network (Aargau)
