= Uetikon am See =

- Municipality
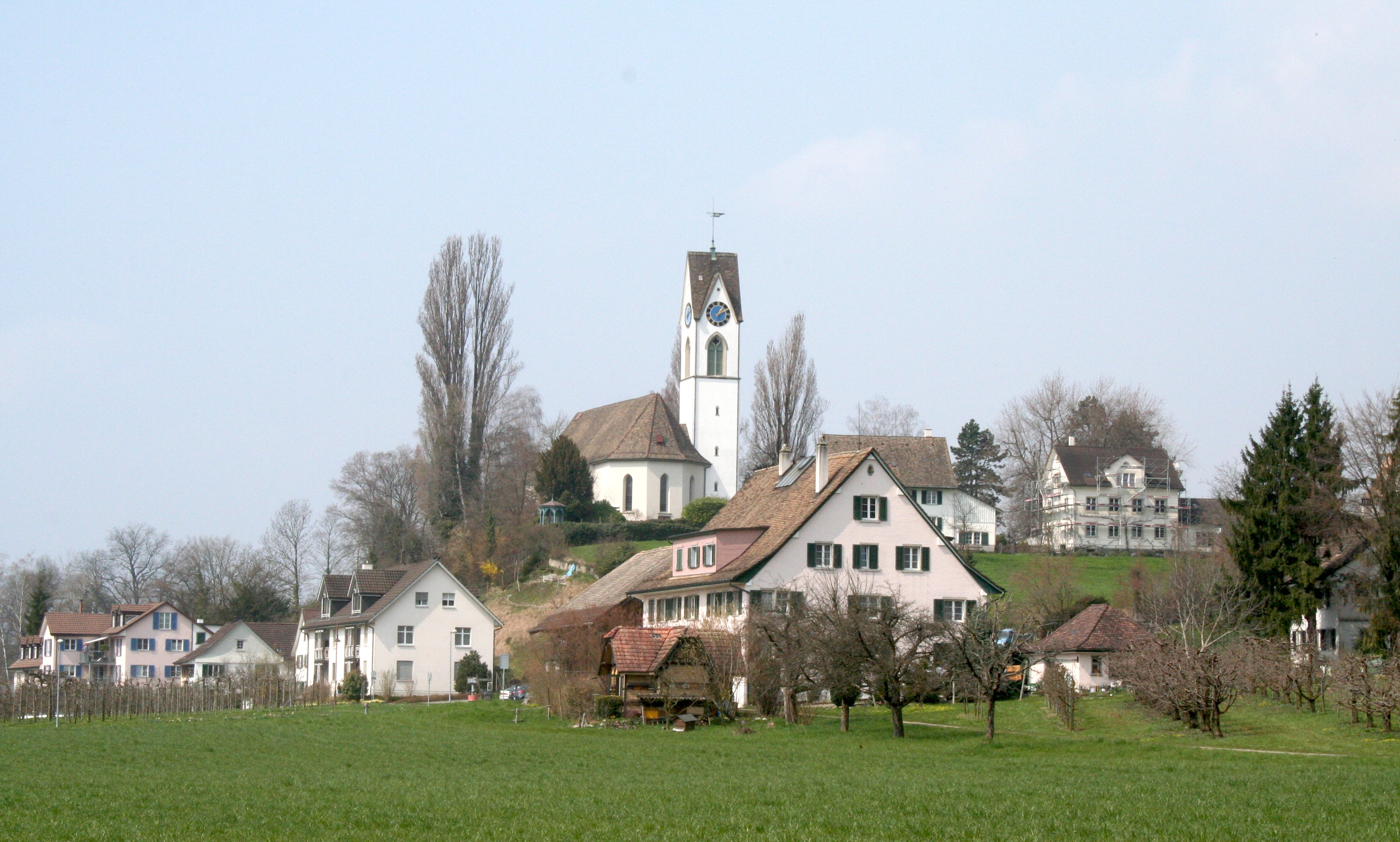

- Flag Coat of arms
- Location of Uetikon am See
- Location within Switzerland Location within Canton of Zurich
- Coordinates: 47°16′N 8°41′E
- Country: Switzerland
- Canton: Zurich
- District: Meilen

Government
  - Executive: Gemeinderat with 8 members[[Urs Mettler (Gemeindepräsident) Thomas Breitenmoser (1. Vizepräsident) Marianne Röhricht (2. Vizepräsident) Reto Linder (Gemeindeschreiber) Hubert Beerli (Mitglied) Hansruedi Bosshard (Mitglied) Irene Pfenninger (Mitglied) Christian Wiedemann (Mitglied)|(list)]])
  - Mayor: Gemeindepräsident; Urs Mettler
  - Parliament: Gemeindeversammlung

Area
  - Total: 3.49 km^{2} (1.35 sq mi)
- Elevation: 414 m (1,358 ft)

Population (6,301)
  - Total: 6,225
  - Density: 1,780/km^{2} (4,620/sq mi)
- Demonym: Uetiker
- Time zone: UTC+01:00 (CET)
  - Summer (DST): UTC+02:00 (CEST)
- Postal code: 8707
- SFOS number: 159
- ISO 3166 code: CH-ZH
- Surrounded by: Egg, Männedorf, Meilen, Oetwil am See, Wädenswil
- Website: https://www.uetikonamsee.ch/

Uetikon am See is a municipality in the district of Meilen in the canton of Zürich in Switzerland.

== History ==
Aerial view (1953)

Uetikon am See is first mentioned in 1150 as Uotinchova. Until 1924 it was known as Uetikon.

== Geography ==
Uetikon am See has an area of 3.49 km^{2} (1.35 sq mi). Of this area, 47% is used for agricultural purposes, while 17% is forested. The rest of the land, (36%) is settled. In 2023 housing and buildings made up 29% of the total area, while transportation infrastructure made up the rest (7%). As of 2007 41.3% of the total municipal area was undergoing some type of construction.

It is located on the north bank of the Lake Zürich in the Pfannenstiel and Goldküste region. The Goldküste region is a wealthy suburban area. Uetikon is located about halfway between Zürich and Rapperswil. In the local dialect it is called Üetike.

The municipality includes the two sections of Uetikon known as Kleindorf and Grossdorf as well as the old settlements of Langenbaum, Oberstmatt, Grüt, Rundirain and Weid. Uetikon is home to a chemical factory of the same name, which is set to be closed. Except for the chemical plant, the harbour and the train station, most of the municipality is located a bit uphill from the lake.

== Demographics ==
Uetikon am See has a population (as of 31 December 2020) of 6,225. As of 2007, 14.9% of the population was made up of foreign nationals. As of 2008 the gender distribution of the population was 48.4% male and 51.6% female. Over the last 10 years the population has grown at a rate of 29.8%. Most of the population (as of 2000) speaks German (89.1%), with Italian being second most common (2.7%) and Albanian being third (1.4%).

In the 2007 election the most popular party was the SVP which received 35.7% of the vote. The next three most popular parties were the FDP (19.2%), the SPS (16.6%) and the CSP (10.1%).

The age distribution of the population (as of 2000) is children and teenagers (0–19 years old) make up 22.2% of the population, while adults (20–64 years old) make up 61% and seniors (over 64 years old) make up 16.9%. In Uetikon am See about 81.5% of the population (between age 25-64) have completed either non-mandatory upper secondary education or additional higher education (either university or a Fachhochschule). There are 2113 households in Uetikon am See.

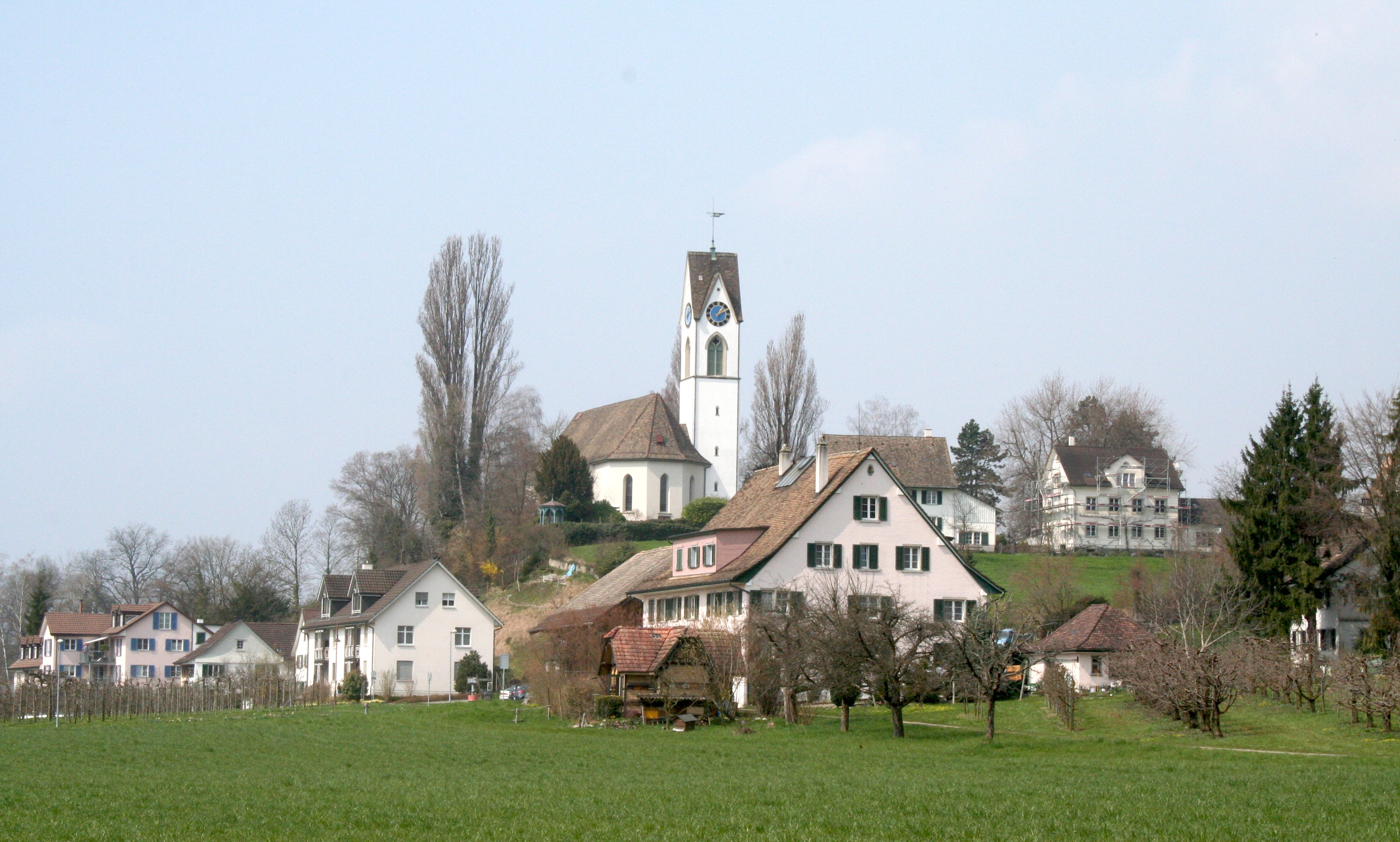
Swiss Reformed Church of Uetikon

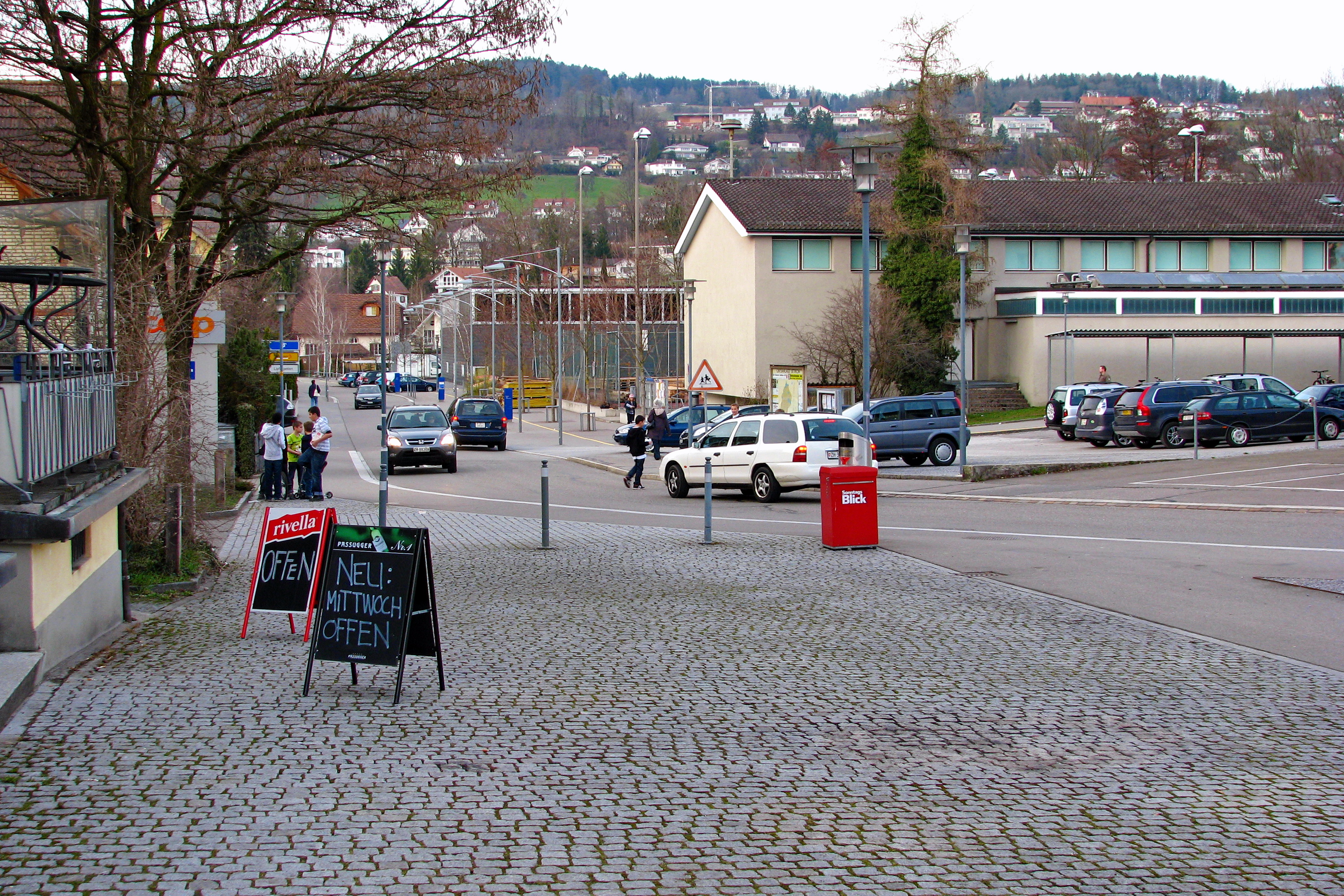

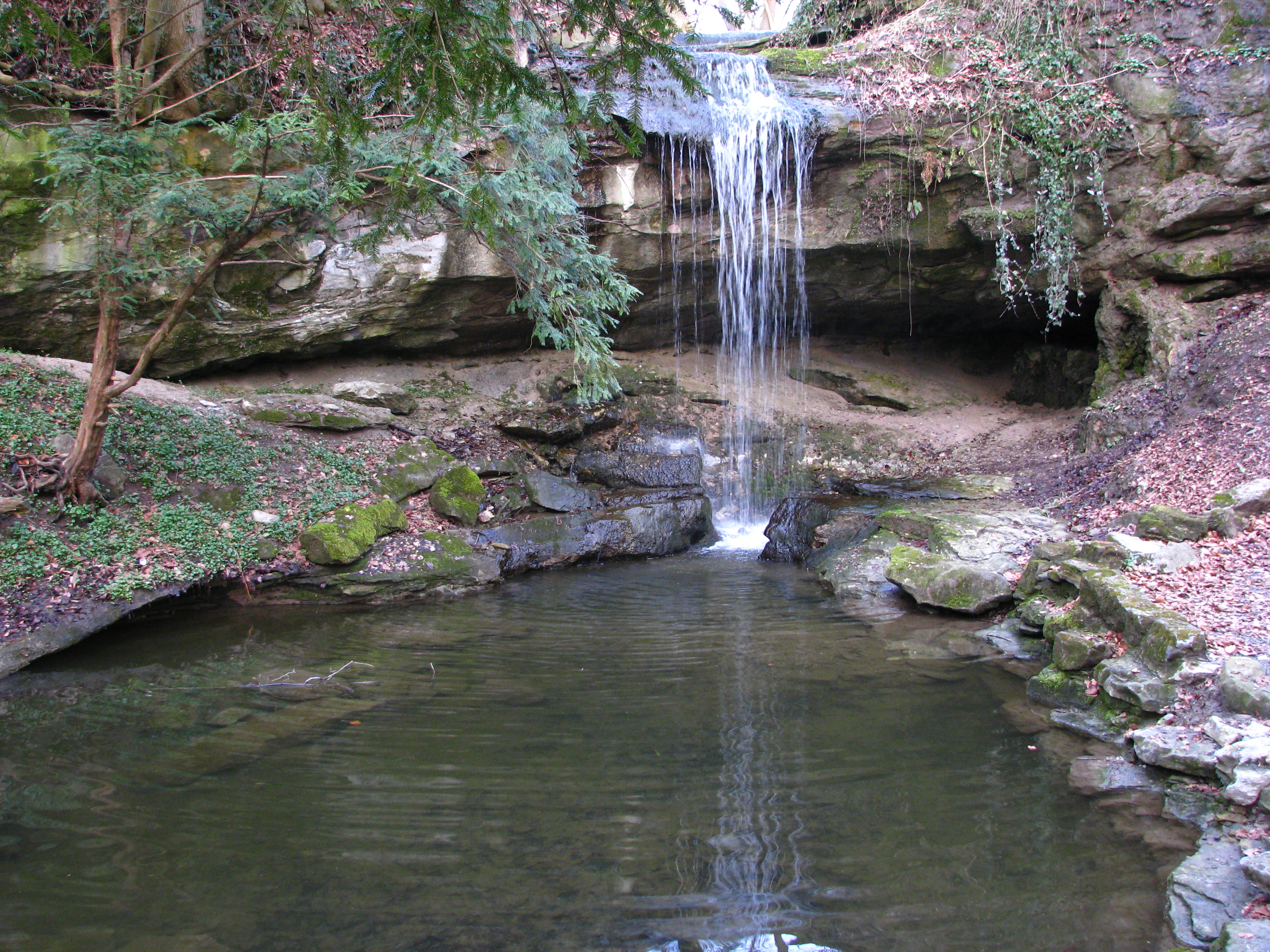
Risitobel valley on southern Pfannenstiel plateau

Uetikon am See has an unemployment rate of 1.48%. As of 2005, there were 61 people employed in the primary economic sector and about 17 businesses involved in this sector. 415 people are employed in the secondary sector and there are 47 businesses in this sector. 950 people are employed in the tertiary sector, with 153 businesses in this sector. As of 2007 43.3% of the working population were employed full-time, and 56.7% were employed part-time.

As of 2008 there were 1554 Catholics and 2466 Protestants in Uetikon am See. In the 2000 census, religion was broken down into several smaller categories. From the census, 51.7% were some type of Protestant, with 48.1% belonging to the Swiss Reformed Church and 3.6% belonging to other Protestant churches. 27.1% of the population were Catholic. Of the rest of the population, 0% were Muslim, 4.4% belonged to another religion (not listed), 2.7% did not give a religion, and 13.6% were atheist or agnostic.

Historical population

Year	Pop.	±% p.a.
1634	382	—
1850	1,121	+0.50%
1900	1,365	+0.39%
1950	2,521	+1.23%

Year	Pop.	±% p.a.
1990	4,026	+1.18%
2000	4,935	+2.06%
2015	5,962	+1.27%

== Transportation ==
Uetikon railway station is a terminal station of the S6 line of the Zürich S-Bahn, and is also serviced by the S7 (every 30 minutes) and SN7 (night) lines.

Bus routes 931 and 932 provide a local service to Uetikon railway station, while bus route 925 and weekend night bus route N92 provide a service to Meilen and Stäfa.

In the summer there are regular boats along the lake to Zurich and Rapperswil, run by the Zürichsee-Schifffahrtsgesellschaft (ZSG).
