= Würenlos railway station =

Railway station in Würenlos, Switzerland

Würenlos
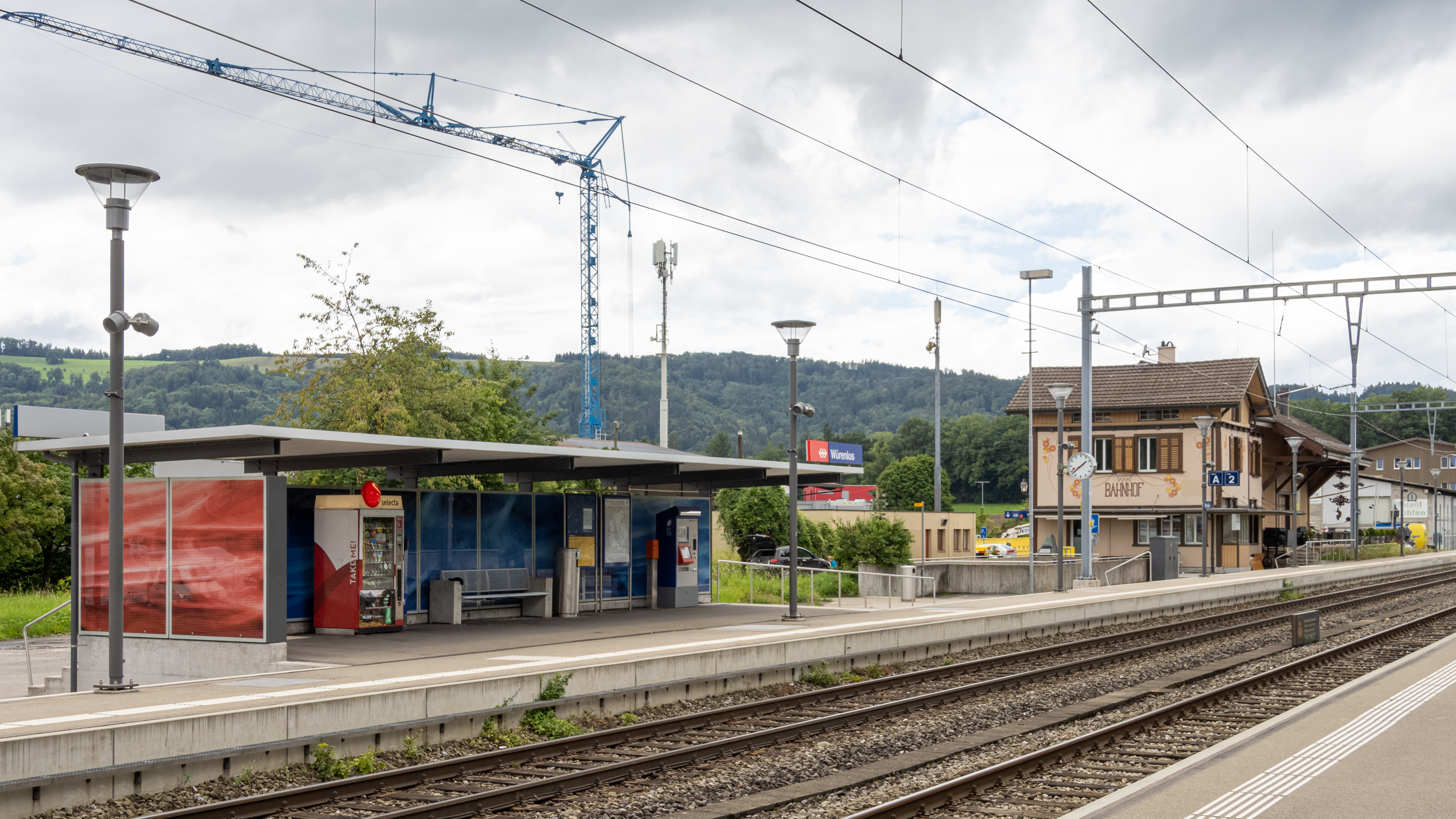

General information
- Location: Bahnhofstrasse; Würenlos, Aargau; Switzerland
- Coordinates: 47.445649°N 8.357871°E
- Elevation: 420 m (1,380 ft)
- Owner: Swiss Federal Railways
- Operator: Swiss Federal Railways
- Line: Furttal line
- Platforms: 2 side platforms
- Tracks: 2
- Connections: A-Welle
- Bus: RVBW bus route 11

Other information
- Fare zone: 572 (A-Welle)

Services
Preceding station	Zurich S-Bahn	Following station
Wettingen towards Baden	S6	Otelfingen towards Uetikon
Terminus	SN6 Limited service	Otelfingen towards Winterthur
Location
- Location within Switzerland Location within Canton of Aargau

Würenlos is a railway station in the municipality of Würenlos in the Swiss canton of Aargau. The station is located on the Furttal line, within fare zone 572 of the A-Welle fare network (Tarifverbund A-Welle). The station is served only by S-Bahn trains.

== Service ==
=== S-Bahn ===
Würenlos is an intermediate stop o the S6 service of Zurich S-Bahn, which operate half-hourly between Baden and Uetikon, via Regensdorf and Zurich. On weekends (Friday and Saturday nights), there is a nighttime S-Bahn service (SN6) offered by ZVV. In summary:

- Zurich S-Bahn:
  - S6: half-hourly service to Baden, and to Uetikon via Zürich HB.
  - Nighttime S-Bahn (only during weekends):
    - SN6: hourly service to Winterthur via Zürich Stadelhofen.

=== Bus ===
The railway station is also served by Regionale Verkehrsbetriebe Baden-Wettingen (RVBW) bus route 11.

== See also ==
- Rail transport in Switzerland
