= Wettingen–Effretikon railway line =

Railway line in Switzerland

Overview
- Owner: Swiss Federal Railways/THURBO
- Line number: 703 Wettingen–Zürich Seebach; 750, 800 S7 Opfikon–Effretikon
- Termini: Wettingen; Effretikon

Technical
- Number of tracks: 2: Otelfingen–Otelfingen Industrie, Buchs-Dällikon Industrie–Buchs-Dällikon, Regensdorf-Watt–Zürich Seebach, Opfikon junction–Riet, Dorfnest junction–Effretikon
- Track gauge: 1,435 mm (4 ft 8 1/2 in) standard gauge
- Electrification: 15 kV/16.7 Hz AC overhead catenary

The Wettingen–Effretikon railway line (sometimes called the Furttal Bahn) is a standard-gauge railway line to the northwest of Zürich, Switzerland. It was opened on 15 October 1877 by the Swiss National Railway (Schweizerische Nationalbahn; SNB). The trains ran past Zürich to its north, which meant that it was not connected to this important centre of industry. This circumstance was one of the reasons for the bankruptcy of the company in 1878. The line was then taken over by the Swiss Northeastern Railway (Schweizerische Nordostbahn; NOB). It has been part of the network of the Swiss Federal Railways (SBB) since 1902.

== History ==
Originally it had been planned to open the adjoining Wettingen–Baden Oberstadt section together with the line towards Zofingen on 6 September 1877. However, as there were delays in the construction of the bridges over the Limmat and a connecting line to the Limmattal line of the NOB, the line and the connecting line could only be opened after one and a half months delay on 15 October 1877.

The first experiments with high-voltage single-phase alternating current took place between Zurich-Seebach and Wettingen between 1905 and 1909. Afterwards the Catenary was dismantled.

Re-electrification of the Opfikon–Wettingen line was completed on 13 February 1942. The electrification of the Zürich-Oerlikon–Kloten–Effretikon line had been completed on 6 August 1925. The section between Zürich-Seebach and Schärenmoos (now Opfikon), the so-called Konkurskurve (bankruptcy curve), was closed between 25 May 1909 and 15 November 1939 (but the Oerlikon-Schärenmoos-(Kloten) line, which was built later remained open).

The Wettingen–Effretikon line is the continuation of the Zofingen–Suhr–Lenzburg–Wettingen line. The track between Effretikon and Winterthur was laid parallel to the existing double track of the NOB. The NOB rebuilt this third track on the Effretikon-Winterthur section around 1880, during which the substructure was retained. The track of the Niederglatt–Wettingen railway (also known as the Bülach-Baden-Bahn) was built by the NOB next to the track of the SNB between Wettingen and Otelfingen. The second track was dismantled by the NOB after the merger of the two lines in 1882.

A freight train, which consisted of tank wagons carrying petrol, derailed at Affoltern station on 8 March 1994. This caused a serious crash involving explosions.

== Route ==
The line begins in Wettingen, where there was a connection to the Baden–Zürich line (known as the Spanisch-Brötli-Bahn) of the NOB. There was also a depot here. The line lies on the eastern side of the Limmat and runs to Würenlos, where it branches out of the Limmat Valley into the Furttal (Furt valley). Between the two villages that from Tägerfeld is the Tägerhard multi-purpose hall. No station has been built to date due to a lack of funding. In Würenlos there has been a branch to Killwangen-Spreitenbach since 1980, which allows freight trains to reach the Limmattal marshalling yard via the Furttal. The Niederglatt–Wettingen railway once branched off the line in Otelfingen, but the line to Bülach was closed in 1969. This remaining part of the line was long used to give access to part of the industrial area of Otelfingen, but it was finally closed in 2007. The Jelmoli Otelfingen shopping centre is located in the industrial area. After the closure of the Otelfingen central warehouse, the station was renamed Otelfingen Industrie and later Otelfingen Riedholz and it has been called Otelfingen Golfpark since the opening of the golf course.

An express goods yard was planned between the stations of Otelfingen and Buchs-Dällikon until the 1970s, but it was never built. The line runs to Buchs-Dällikon, which is on a level area between the two named villages and on to Regensdorf-Watt. When it was built this station was outside the actual village, but the built-up area has expanded as far as the station. The section between Regensdorf-Watt and Zurich-Seebach was double-tracked between 1996 and 1997. This is followed by the so-called bankruptcy curve, which passes around Oerlikon station and heads north, where the line crosses the Zurich-Bülach line on an embankment and viaduct. The curve connecting Seebach station with Oerlikon station was built by the SBB in 1909. The line between Schärenmoos and Zurich-Oerlikon was built by the NOB after the bankruptcy of the SNB and opened on 1 June 1881. Several renovations and extensions were made in Schärenmoos during the construction of the airport line. So the line here has included a double-track loop since 1978, which runs from convergence with the line from Zürich-Oerlikon (Schärenmoos crossover) to Ried crossover. This additional track runs with the existing viaduct over the line to Bülach and is used to allow trains to run separately, since after crossing the Bülach line there is a set of points connecting to the airport line (in the area of the SBB Oerlikon substation there have been three double-track lines next to each other since 1979) and then both lines are located in a covered trench. The Opfikon halt was built in this area at that time. The only tunnel on this line, the 257-metre-long Opfikon Tunnel, has been located here since 1978. This tunnel is just a cut-and-cover structure that contains Opfikon station. The tunnel thus serves as weather protection for almost the whole length of the 300 metre-long island platform.

On the western side, before Opfikon station, is the connection to the line to Bülach, which allows direct operations from Bülach through the Furt valley to Wettingen. It was built during the construction of the airport line and opened on 30 September 1979. The airport line has run under the line after Opfikon station and just before its entrance to the airport tunnel since 1980. It runs to Kloten, after which the line reconnects to the airport line at the Dorfnest crossover. From here it has been duplicated to Effretikon since the construction of the airport line. However, the line was relocated in the area of the Bassersdorf station for the construction of the airport line and duplicated. The line was straightened and the station was moved from the centre to the edge of the village. Shortly before Effretikon, immediately before the Hürlistein crossover, the line crosses the A1. At the Hürlistein crossover, this line joins the Zürich–Wallisellen–Winterthur line, which was opened in 1855 by the NOB. The Effretikon–Hinwil railway has begun at Effretikon station with its three platform tracks since its construction in 1876 (initially as a single-track line beside the NOB double track). The line between Hürlistein and Effretikon was quadrupled together with the construction of the Hürlistein crossover in 2015.

The SNB also built a third track between Effretikon and Winterthur, which was laid parallel to the NOB line. This track was dismantled in 1880 after the liquidation of the SNB and the takeover of the SNB lines by the NOB.
