= Uetikon railway station =

Railway station in Canton of Zürich, Switzerland

Uetikon
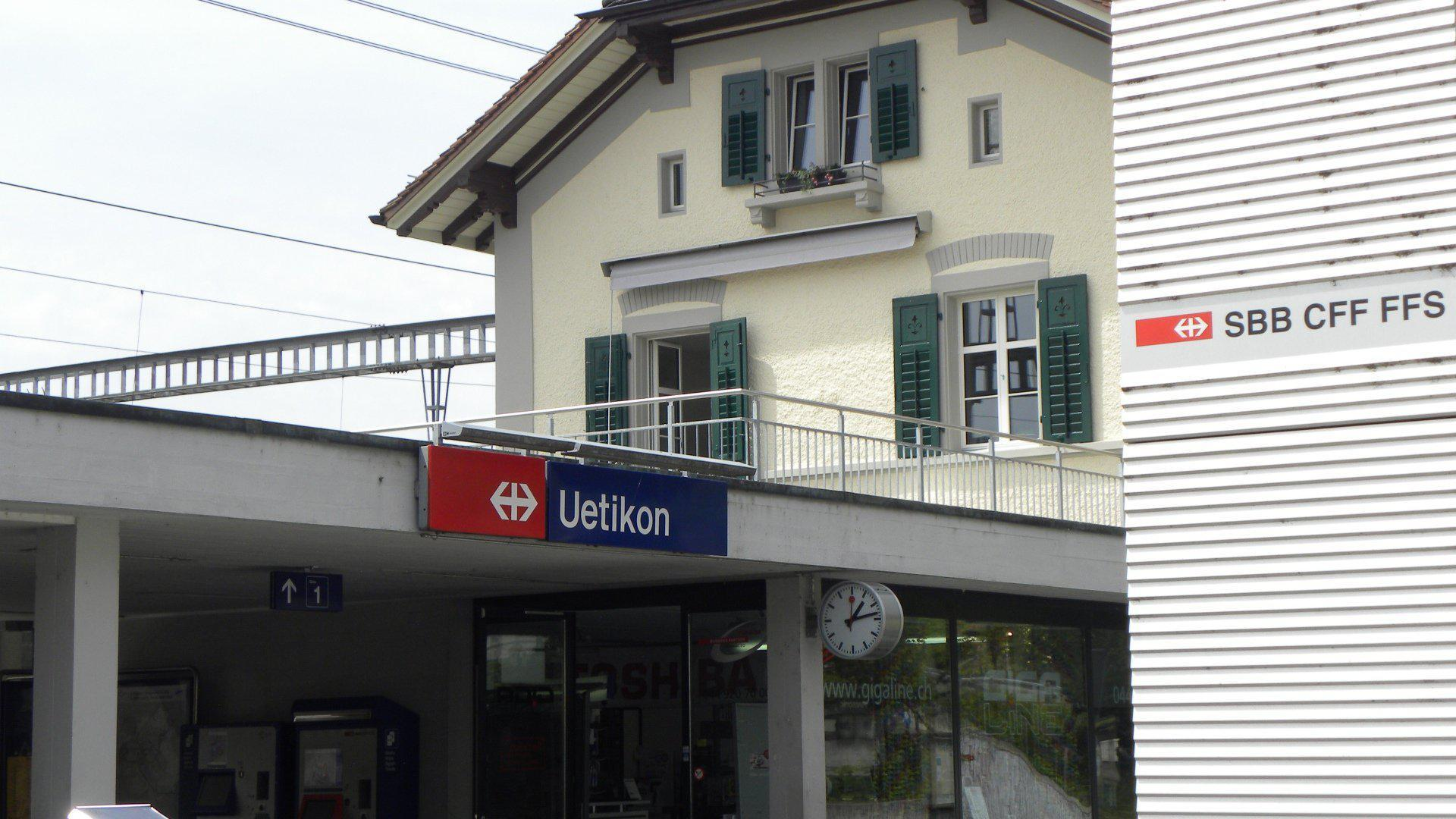
- The station in 2018

General information
- Location: Alte Landstrasse, Uetikon am See, Canton of Zurich, Switzerland
- Coordinates: 47.259283°N 8.678872°E
- Elevation: 414 m (1,358 ft)
- Owner: Swiss Federal Railways
- Operator: Swiss Federal Railways
- Line: Lake Zurich right bank line
- Platforms: 1 island platform, 1 side platform
- Tracks: 6
- Connections: ZVV
- Ship: ZSG passenger ships
- Bus: VZO bus routes 931 932

Other information
- Fare zone: ZVV 142

Services
Preceding station	Zurich S-Bahn	Following station
Meilen towards Baden	S6	Terminus
Meilen towards Winterthur	S7	Männedorf towards Rapperswil
Meilen towards Bassersdorf	SN7 Limited service	Männedorf towards Stäfa
Location
- Location within Switzerland Location within Canton of Zürich

Uetikon is a railway station in the Swiss canton of Zurich, on the eastern shore of Lake Zurich (Goldcoast). The station takes its name from the municipality of Uetikon am See, and is located on the border of that municipality and the adjoining municipality of Männedorf. Uetikon railway station is situated on the Lake Zurich right bank railway line, within fare zone 142 of the Zürcher Verkehrsverbund (ZVV).

== Services ==
=== Rail ===
As of the December 2024 timetable change, the station is served by the following S-Bahn trains:

- Zurich S-Bahn:
  - S6 Baden AG–Regensdorf-Watt–Hardbrücke–Zürich HB–Uetikon
  - S7 Winterthur–Kloten–Hardbrücke–Zürich HB–Meilen–Rapperswil
    Operates non stop between Stadelhofen and Meilen, Winterthur and Effretikon, stops in Kemptthal as of 9:20 PM.

During weekends (Friday and Saturday nights), there is also a nighttime S-Bahn service (SN7) offered by ZVV.

- Nighttime S-Bahn (only during weekends):
  - SN7: hourly service between Bassersdorf and Stäfa (via Zürich HB)

=== Bus ===
A regional bus stop is adjacent to the railway station, served by buses of the Verkehrsbetriebe Zürichsee und Oberland (VZO).

=== Boat ===
Passenger ships of the Zürichsee-Schifffahrtsgesellschaft (ZSG) operate from a lakeside terminal located a short distance west of the railway station. The boats operate either in direction to Zurich Bürkliplatz or Rapperswil/Schmerikon, serving the terminals of several lakeside towns and Ufenau island en route.

== See also ==
- Rail transport in Switzerland
