= Zollikon railway station =

Railway station in Switzerland

Zollikon
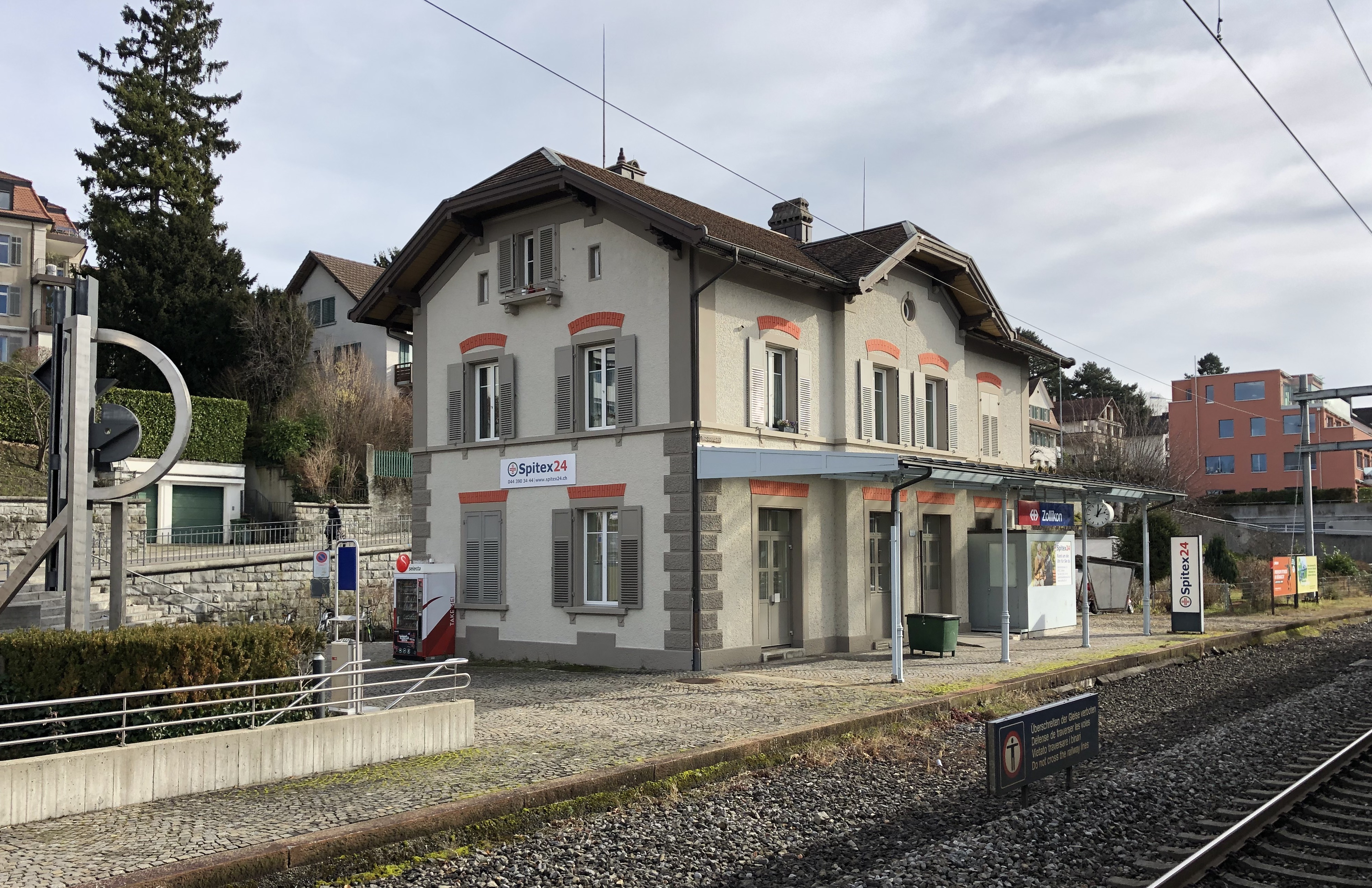
- Station building in 2020

General information
- Location: Bahnhofstrasse, Zollikon, Canton of Zurich, Switzerland
- Coordinates: 47.337278°N 8.569432°E
- Elevation: 415 m (1,362 ft)
- Owner: Swiss Federal Railways
- Operator: Swiss Federal Railways
- Line: Lake Zurich right bank line
- Platforms: 1 island platform
- Tracks: 2
- Connections: ZVV
- Ship: ZSG boat lines
- Bus: AZZK regional buses 910 912 916; VBZ bus line 99
- Airport: Zurich S-Bahn service S16 to/from Zürich Airport in 0:25h

Other information
- Fare zone: ZVV 140

Services
Preceding station	Zurich S-Bahn	Following station
Zürich Tiefenbrunnen towards Baden	S6	Küsnacht Goldbach towards Uetikon
Zürich Tiefenbrunnen towards Zurich Airport	S16	Küsnacht Goldbach towards Herrliberg-Feldmeilen
Zürich Tiefenbrunnen towards Bassersdorf	SN7 Limited service	Küsnacht Goldbach towards Stäfa
Location
- Location within Switzerland

Zollikon is a railway station in Switzerland, situated near the eastern bank of Lake Zurich (Goldcoast) in the municipality of Zollikon. The station is on the Lake Zurich right bank railway line. It is located within fare zone 140 of the Zürcher Verkehrsverbund (ZVV).

== Services ==
The station is served by the following S-Bahn trains:

Line ♯	Route	Typical Frequency	Notes
S6	Baden - Wettingen - Würenlos - Otelfingen - Otelfingen Golfpark - Buchs-Dällikon - Regensdorf-Watt - Zürich Affoltern - Zürich Seebach - Zürich Oerlikon - Zürich Hardbrücke - Zürich Hauptbahnhof - Zürich Stadelhofen - Zürich Tiefenbrunnen - Zollikon - Küsnacht Goldbach - Küsnacht - Erlenbach ZH - Winkel am Zürichsee - Herrliberg-Feldmeilen - Meilen - Uetikon	2 trains per hour	Zurich S-Bahn
S16	Zurich Airport - Zürich Oerlikon - Zürich Hardbrücke - Zürich Hauptbahnhof - Zürich Stadelhofen - Zürich Tiefenbrunnen - Zollikon - Küsnacht Goldbach - Küsnacht - Erlenbach ZH - Winkel am Zürichsee - Herrliberg-Feldmeilen	2 trains per hour	Zurich S-Bahn
SN7	Bassersdorf - Kloten - Kloten Balsberg - Opfikon - Zürich Oerlikon - Zürich Hardbrücke - Zürich Hauptbahnhof - Zürich Stadelhofen - Zürich Tiefenbrunnen - Zollikon - Küsnacht Goldbach - Küsnacht - Erlenbach ZH - Winkel am Zürichsee - Herrliberg-Feldmeilen - Meilen - Uetikon - Männedorf - Stäfa	1 train per hour during the nights from Friday to Saturday and from Saturday to Sunday	Nighttime S-Bahn

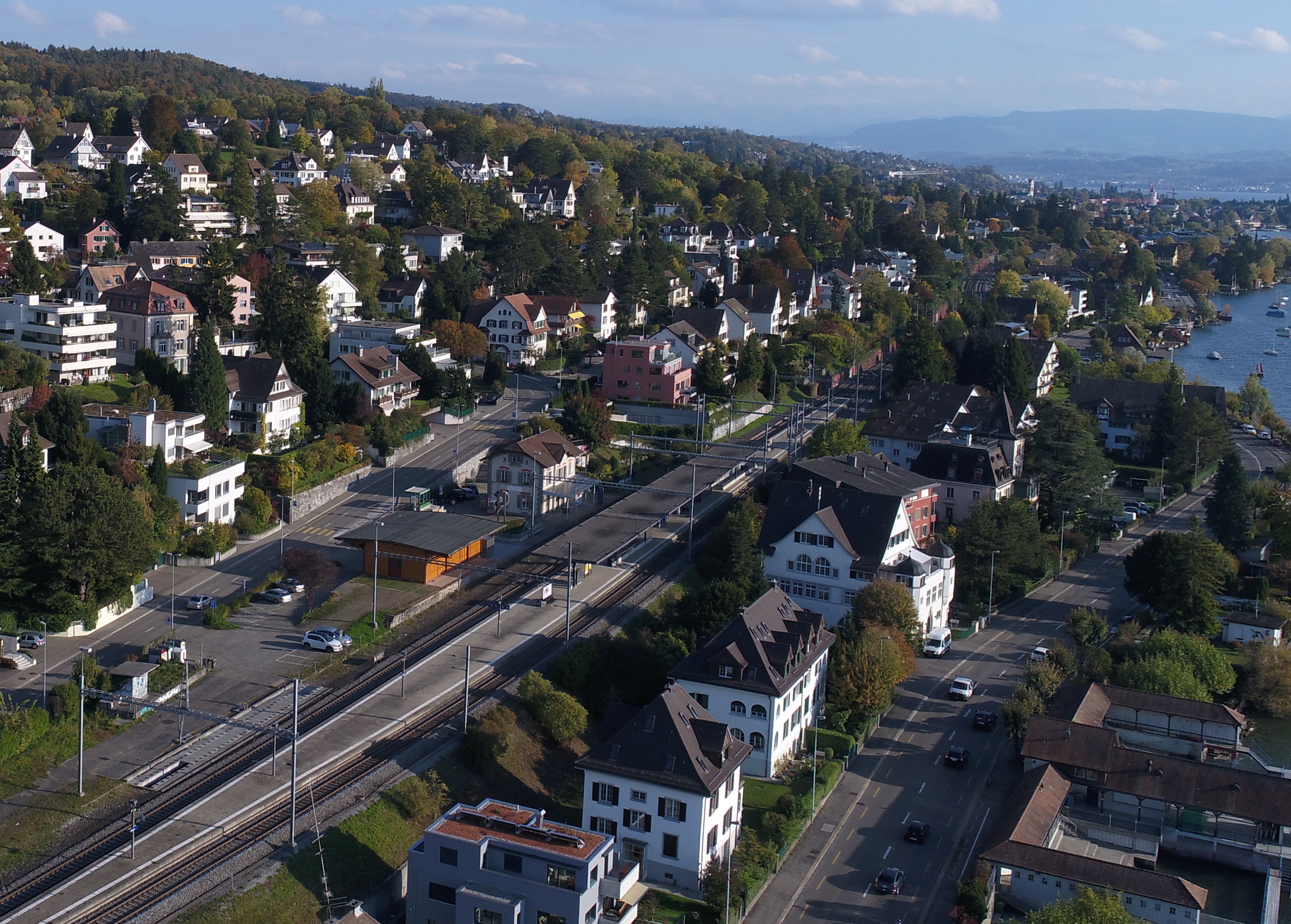
Aerial view of the station

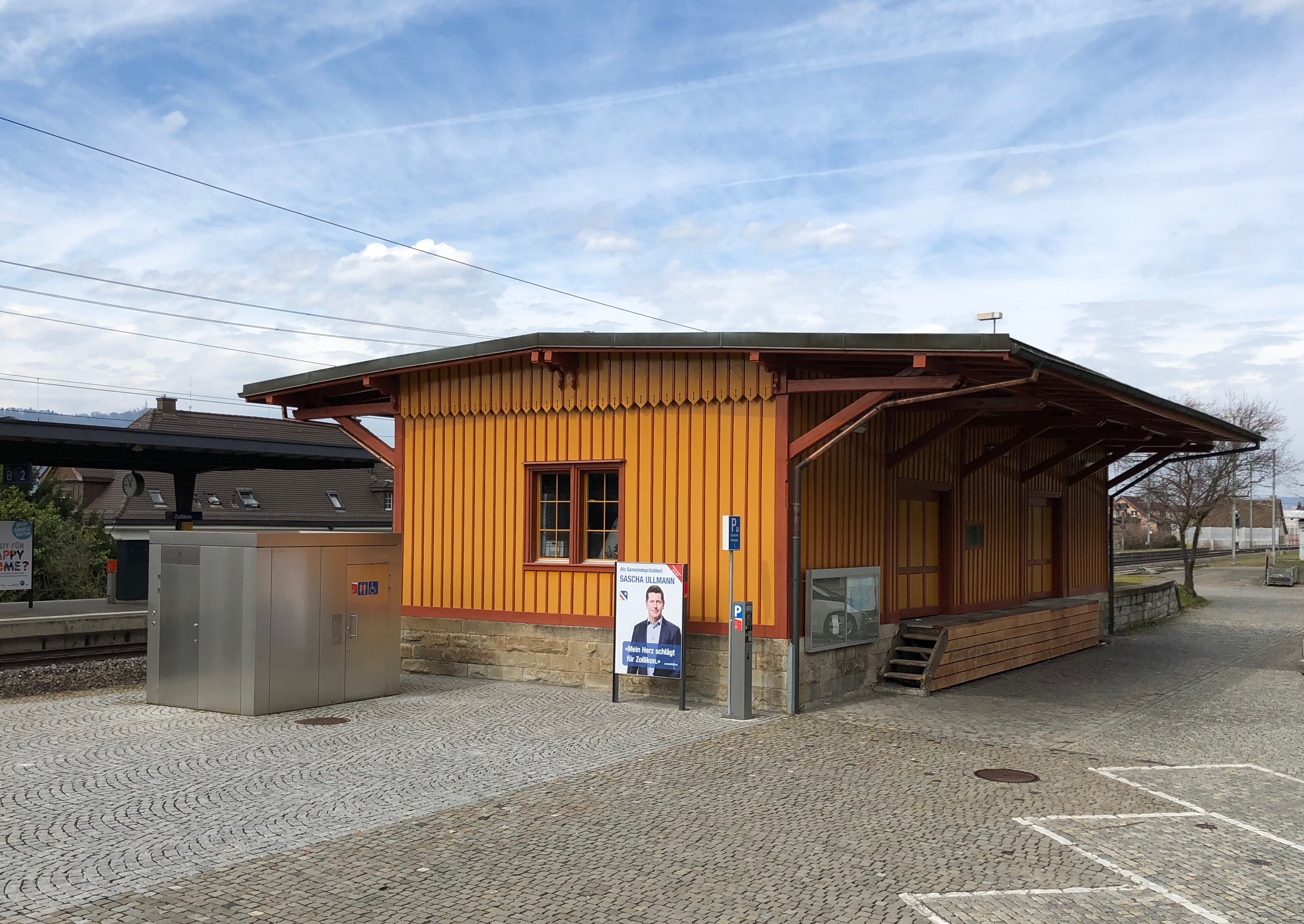
Railway goods shed near the station

== See also ==
- Zollikerberg railway station
- Rail transport in Switzerland
