= Zurich Tiefenbrunnen railway station =

Railway station in the Seefeld quarter of the Swiss city of Zürich

Zürich Tiefenbrunnen
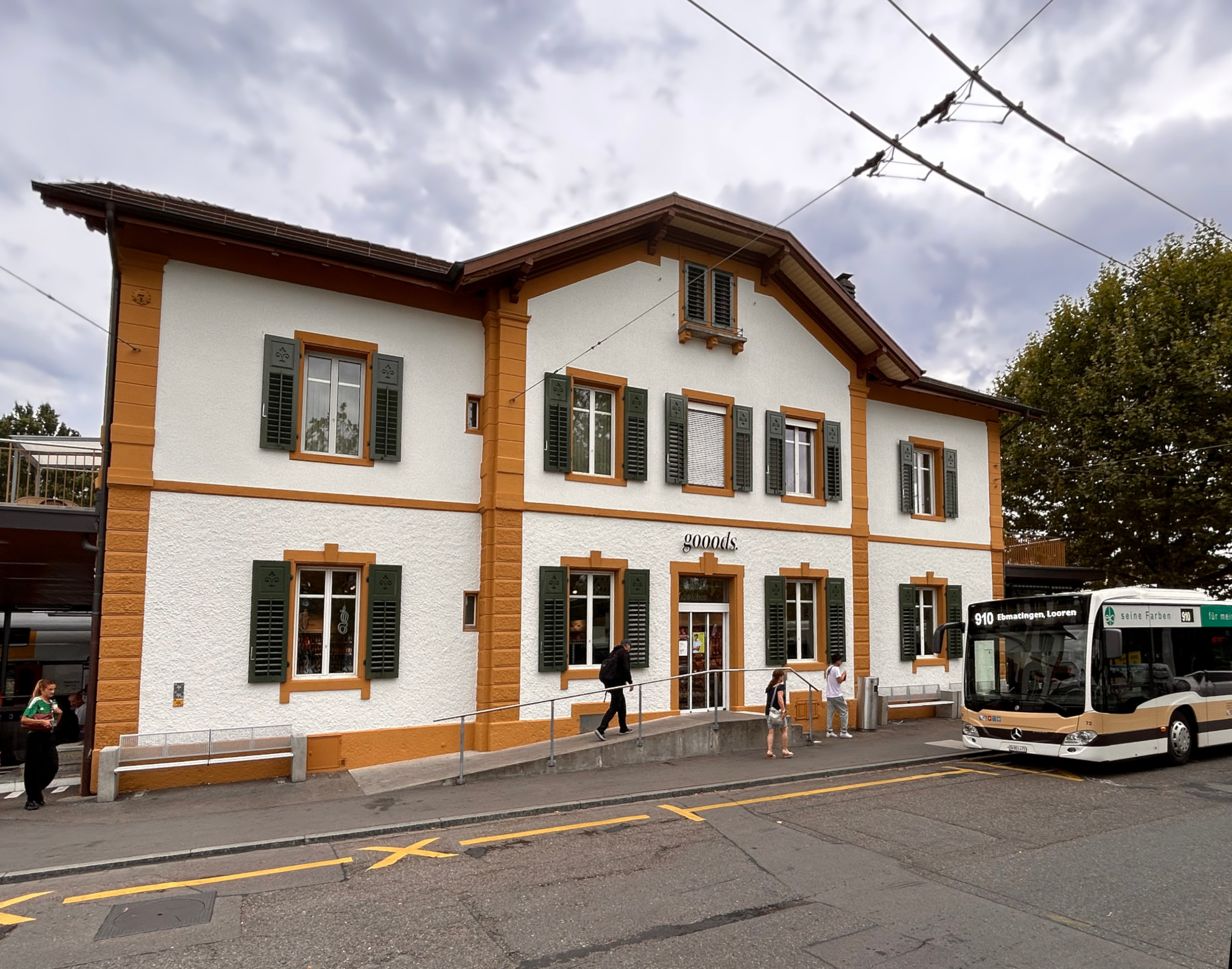
- Station building and AZZK bus in 2023

General information
- Location: Tiefenbrunnen, City of Zurich, Canton of Zurich, Switzerland
- Coordinates: 47°21′00″N 8°33′41″E
- Elevation: 408 m (1,339 ft)
- Owner: Swiss Federal Railways
- Operator: Swiss Federal Railways
- Line: Lake Zurich right bank line
- Platforms: 3
- Connections: ZVV
- Ship: ZSG boat lines
- Tram: VBZ trams 11 15
- Trolleybus: VBZ trolleybus 33
- Bus: AZZK regional buses 912 916
- Airport: Zurich S-Bahn service S16 to/from Zürich Airport in 0:20h

Other information
- Fare zone: ZVV 110 and 140

Services
Preceding station	Zurich S-Bahn	Following station
Zürich Stadelhofen towards Baden	S6	Zollikon towards Uetikon
Zürich Stadelhofen towards Zurich Airport	S16	Zollikon towards Herrliberg-Feldmeilen
Zürich Stadelhofen towards Bassersdorf	SN7 Limited service	Zollikon towards Stäfa
Location
- Location within Switzerland

Zürich Tiefenbrunnen railway station (German: Bahnhof Zürich Tiefenbrunnen) is a railway station in the Swiss city of Zurich. It is located on the Lake Zurich right bank railway line, and is situated on the shore of Lake Zürich, in the Seefeld quarter of the city, on the border between fare zones 110 and 140 of ZVV.

The Zürichhorn lakeside park, with its Chinese Garden, Centre Le Corbusier, casino and steamer pier, lies some 700 metres (2,300 ft) north-west of the station.

== Operation ==
The station has one side platform and one island platform, served by three tracks, and the station building and entrance is on the west or lake side of the station. The platforms and entrances are connected by a pedestrian subway.

=== S-Bahn ===
The station is served by the following S-Bahn trains:

Line ♯	Route	Typical Frequency	Notes
S6	Baden - Wettingen - Würenlos - Otelfingen - Otelfingen Golfpark - Buchs-Dällikon - Regensdorf-Watt - Zürich Affoltern - Zürich Seebach - Zürich Oerlikon - Zürich Hardbrücke - Zürich Hauptbahnhof - Zürich Stadelhofen - Zürich Tiefenbrunnen - Zollikon - Küsnacht Goldbach - Küsnacht - Erlenbach ZH - Winkel am Zürichsee - Herrliberg-Feldmeilen - Meilen - Uetikon	2 trains per hour	Zurich S-Bahn
S16	Zurich Airport - Zürich Oerlikon - Zürich Hardbrücke - Zürich Hauptbahnhof - Zürich Stadelhofen - Zürich Tiefenbrunnen - Zollikon - Küsnacht Goldbach - Küsnacht - Erlenbach ZH - Winkel am Zürichsee - Herrliberg-Feldmeilen	2 trains per hour	Zurich S-Bahn
SN7	Bassersdorf - Kloten - Kloten Balsberg - Opfikon - Zürich Oerlikon - Zürich Hardbrücke - Zürich Hauptbahnhof - Zürich Stadelhofen - Zürich Tiefenbrunnen - Zollikon - Küsnacht Goldbach - Küsnacht - Erlenbach ZH - Winkel am Zürichsee - Herrliberg-Feldmeilen - Meilen - Uetikon - Männedorf - Stäfa	1 train per hour during the nights from Friday to Saturday and from Saturday to Sunday	Nighttime S-Bahn

=== Tram and bus ===
Adjacent to the station is the terminus of lines 11 and 15 of the Zurich tram system and route 33 of the Zurich trolleybus system, all operated by Verkehrsbetriebe Zürich, the municipal transport operator for Zürich. The station is also served by regional bus routes of the Autobusbetrieb Zürich–Zollikon–Küsnacht (AZZK).

=== Boat ===
The pier across the station building is served by boats of the Zürichsee-Schifffahrtsgesellschaft (ZSG), of both its Lake Zurich and River Limmat services.

== Gallery ==
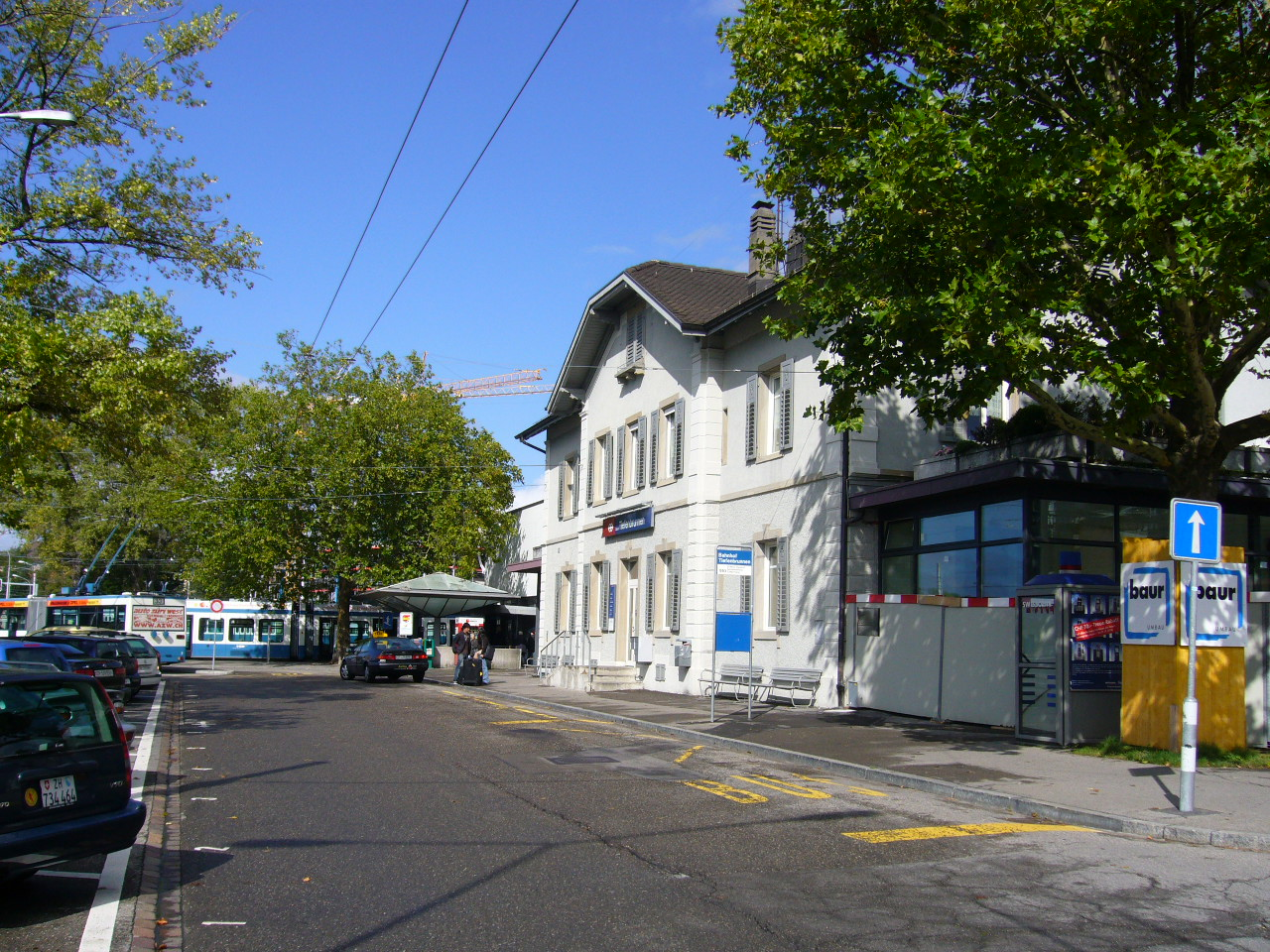
The station frontage

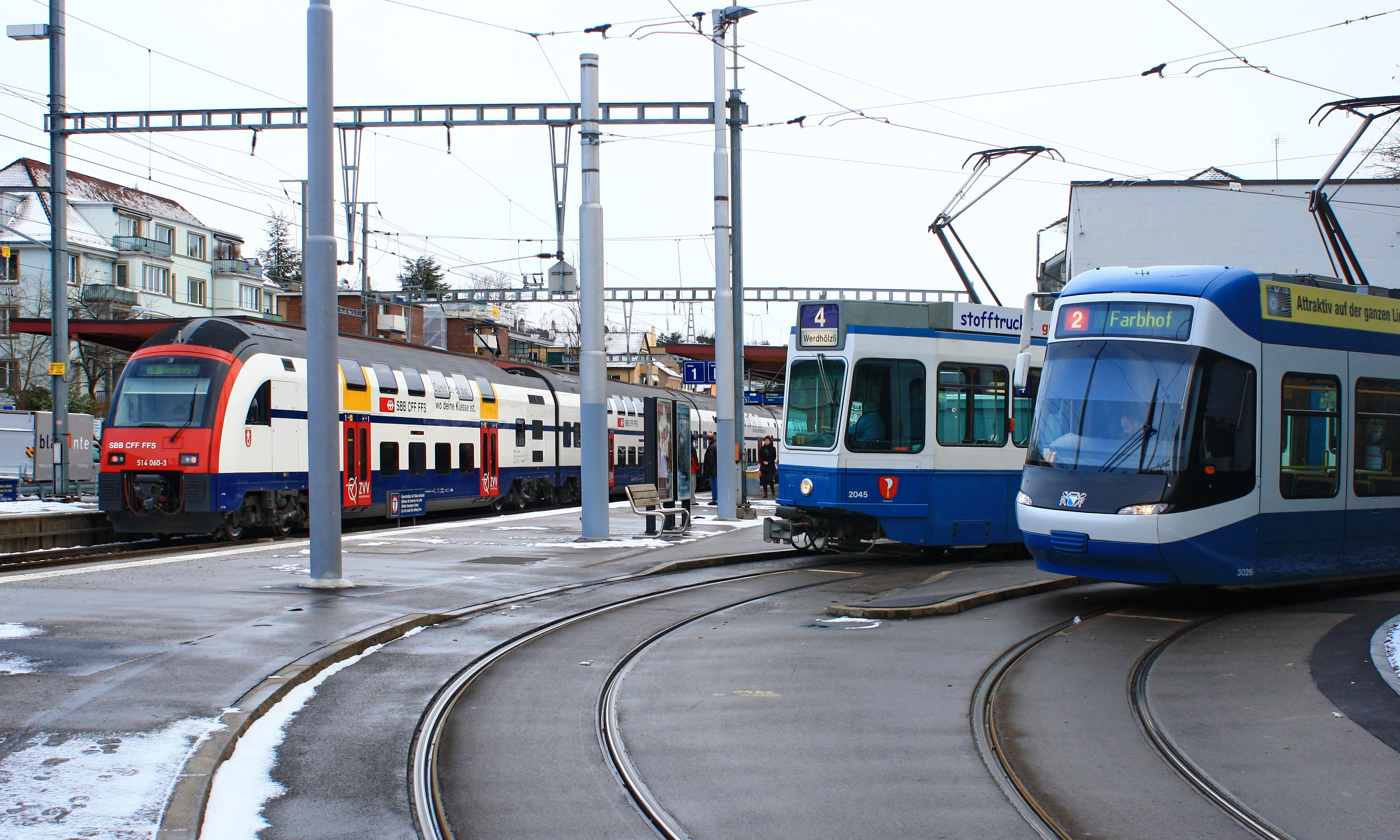
Interchange between train and tram

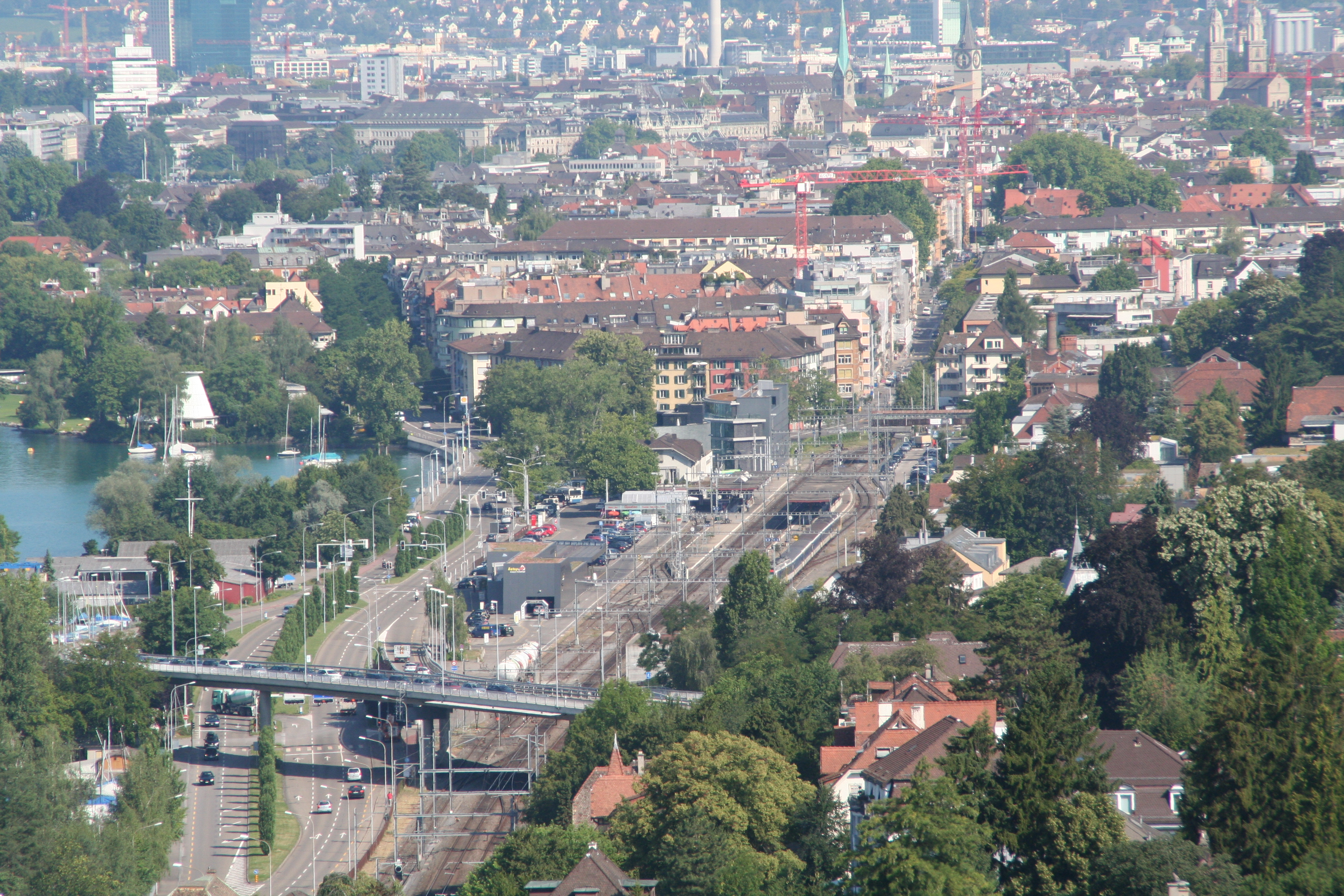
Aerial view of the station looking west

== See also ==
- List of railway stations in Zurich
- Public transport in Zurich
