= Küsnacht Goldbach railway station =

Railway station in Canton of Zürich, Switzerland

Küsnacht Goldbach
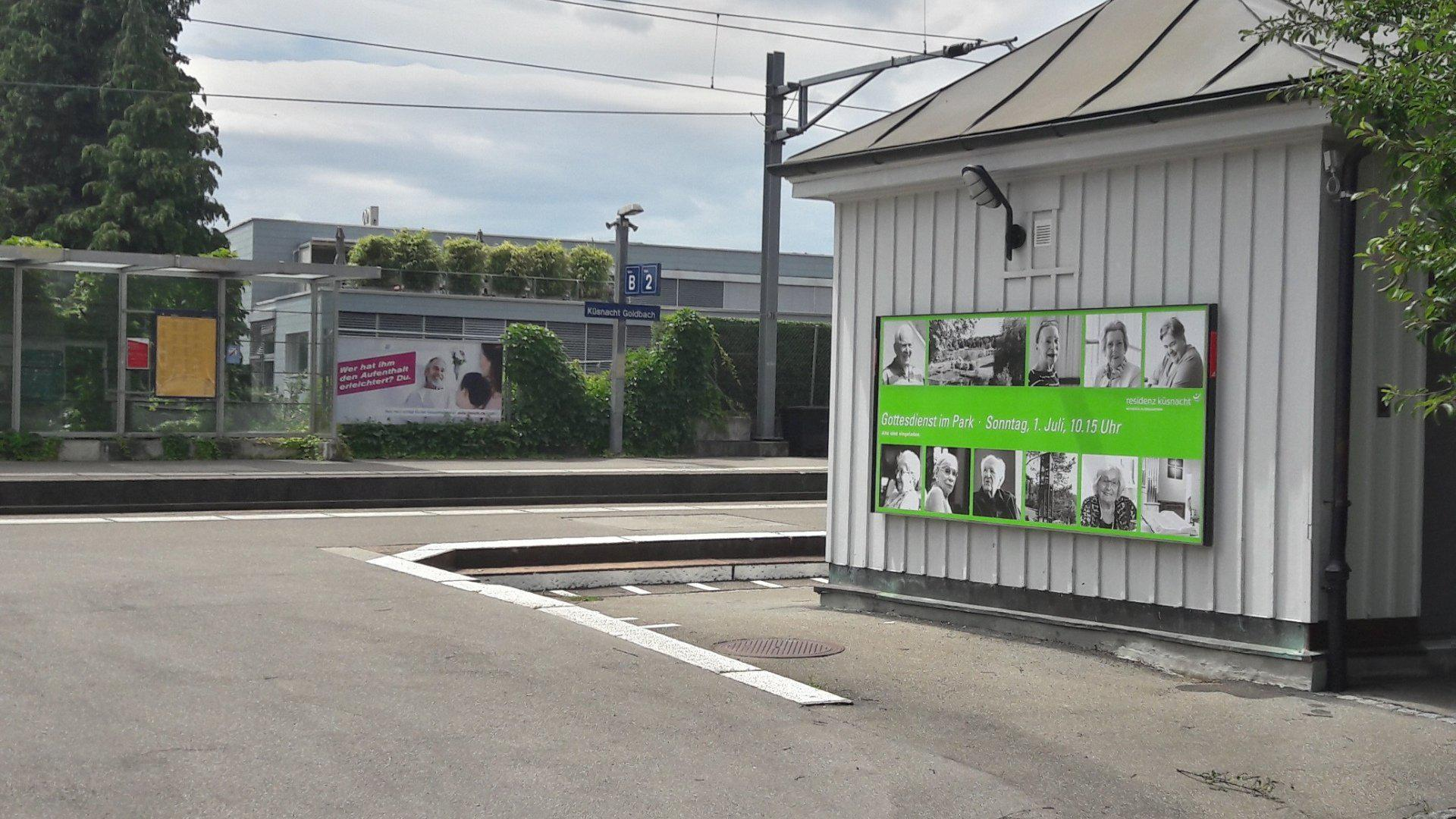
- The station platforms in 2018

General information
- Location: Goldbach, Küsnacht, Canton of Zurich, Switzerland
- Coordinates: 47.327181°N 8.575784°E
- Elevation: 417 m (1,368 ft)
- Owner: Swiss Federal Railways
- Operator: Swiss Federal Railways
- Line: Lake Zurich right bank line
- Platforms: 2 side platforms

Other information
- Fare zone: ZVV 140

Services
Preceding station	Zurich S-Bahn	Following station
Zollikon towards Baden	S6	Küsnacht ZH towards Uetikon
Zollikon towards Zurich Airport	S16	Küsnacht ZH towards Herrliberg-Feldmeilen
Zollikon towards Bassersdorf	SN7 Limited service	Küsnacht ZH towards Stäfa
Location
- Location within Switzerland

Küsnacht Goldbach is a railway station in Switzerland, situated near the eastern bank of Lake Zurich (Goldcoast) in the village of Goldbach, which is itself in the municipality of Küsnacht. The station is on the Lake Zurich right bank railway line. It is located within fare zone 140 of the Zürcher Verkehrsverbund (ZVV).

It is one of four railway stations in the municipality of Küsnacht, the other being Küsnacht ZH, located on the same line, and Forch and Neue Forch, both located on the Forch Railway line.

== Services ==
The station is served by the following S-Bahn trains:

Line ♯	Route	Typical Frequency	Notes
S6	Baden - Wettingen - Würenlos - Otelfingen - Otelfingen Golfpark - Buchs-Dällikon - Regensdorf-Watt - Zürich Affoltern - Zürich Seebach - Zürich Oerlikon - Zürich Hardbrücke - Zürich Hauptbahnhof - Zürich Stadelhofen - Zürich Tiefenbrunnen - Zollikon - Küsnacht Goldbach - Küsnacht ZH - Erlenbach ZH - Winkel am Zürichsee - Herrliberg-Feldmeilen - Meilen - Uetikon	2 trains per hour	Zurich S-Bahn
S16	Zurich Airport - Zürich Oerlikon - Zürich Hardbrücke - Zürich Hauptbahnhof - Zürich Stadelhofen - Zürich Tiefenbrunnen - Zollikon - Küsnacht Goldbach - Küsnacht ZH - Erlenbach ZH - Winkel am Zürichsee - Herrliberg-Feldmeilen	2 trains per hour	Zurich S-Bahn
SN7	Bassersdorf - Kloten - Kloten Balsberg - Opfikon - Zürich Oerlikon - Zürich Hardbrücke - Zürich Hauptbahnhof - Zürich Stadelhofen - Zürich Tiefenbrunnen - Zollikon - Küsnacht Goldbach - Küsnacht ZH - Erlenbach ZH - Winkel am Zürichsee - Herrliberg-Feldmeilen - Meilen - Uetikon - Männedorf - Stäfa	1 train per hour during the nights from Friday to Saturday and from Saturday to Sunday	Nighttime S-Bahn

== See also ==
- Rail transport in Switzerland
