= Erlenbach ZH railway station =

Railway station in Canton of Zürich, Switzerland

Erlenbach ZH
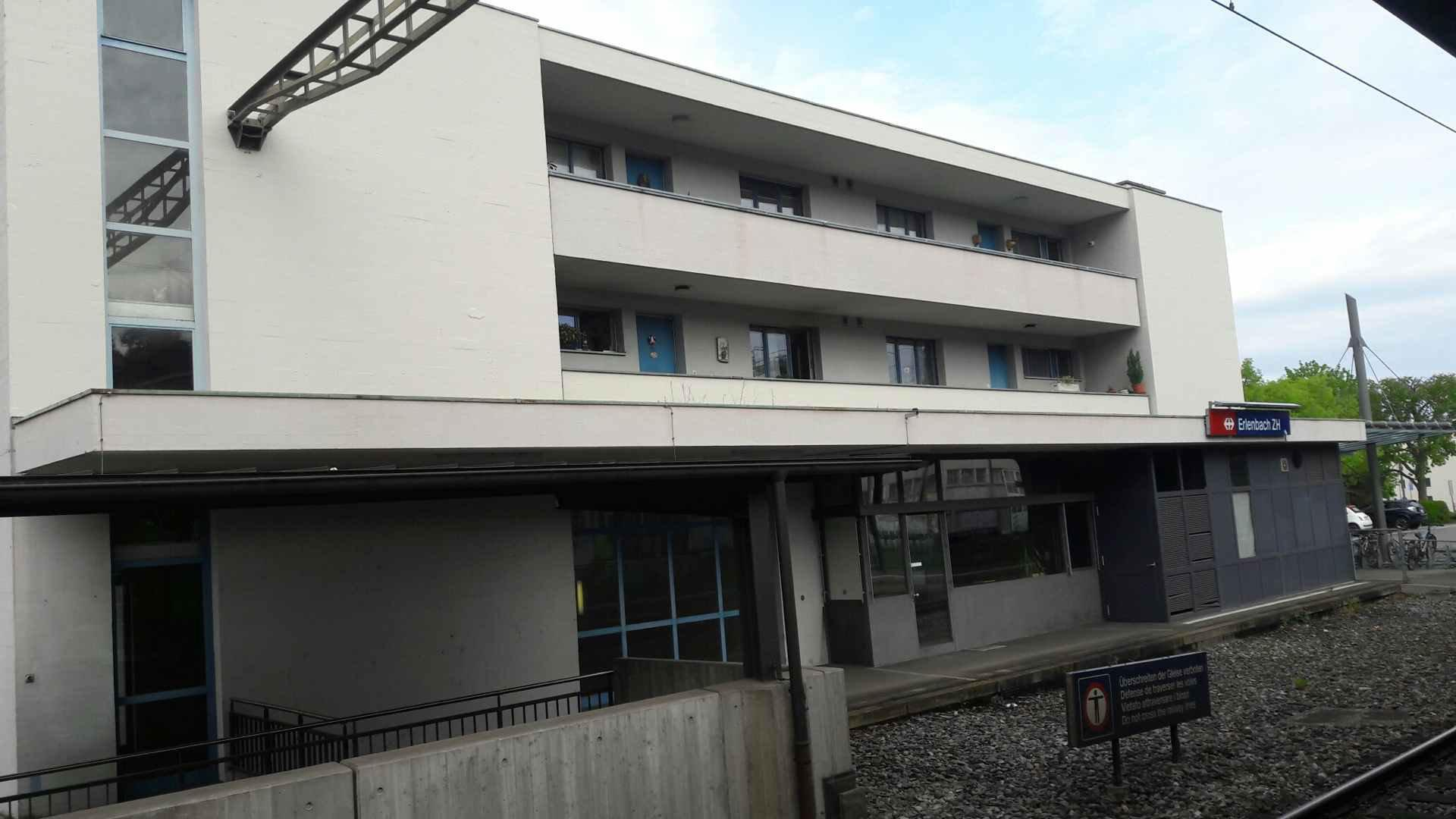
- The station building in 2017

General information
- Location: Bahnhofstrasse, Erlenbach, Canton of Zurich, Switzerland
- Coordinates: 47.305339°N 8.591609°E
- Elevation: 419 m (1,375 ft)
- Owner: Swiss Federal Railways
- Operator: Swiss Federal Railways
- Line: Lake Zurich right bank line
- Platforms: 1 island platform
- Tracks: 2
- Connections: VZO buses 961 962

Other information
- Fare zone: ZVV 140

Services
Preceding station	Zurich S-Bahn	Following station
Küsnacht ZH towards Baden	S6	Winkel am Zürichsee towards Uetikon
Küsnacht ZH towards Zurich Airport	S16	Winkel am Zürichsee towards Herrliberg-Feldmeilen
Küsnacht ZH towards Bassersdorf	SN7 Limited service	Winkel am Zürichsee towards Stäfa
Location
- Location within Switzerland Location within Canton of Zürich

Erlenbach ZH (German: Bahnhof Erlenbach ZH) is a railway station in Switzerland, situated near to the eastern bank of Lake Zurich (Goldcoast) in the municipality of Erlenbach in the canton of Zurich (abbreviated to ZH). The station is on the Lake Zurich right bank railway line, within fare zone 140 of the Zürcher Verkehrsverbund (ZVV).

The station is one of two railway stations in the municipality of Erlenbach, the other being Winkel am Zürichsee.

== Services ==
As of the December 2024 timetable change, the station is served by the following S-Bahn trains:

- Zurich S-Bahn:
  - S6 Baden AG–Regensdorf-Watt–Hardbrücke–Zürich HB–Uetikon
  - S16 Zürich Flughafen –Hardbrücke–Zürich HB–Herrliberg-Feldmeilen (–Meilen)
    Extended in the evening to Meilen.

During weekends (Friday and Saturday nights), there is also a nighttime S-Bahn service (SN7) offered by ZVV.

- Nighttime S-Bahn (only during weekends):
  - SN7: hourly service between Bassersdorf and Stäfa (via Zürich HB)

The station is also served by two bus routes of Verkehrsbetriebe Zürichsee und Oberland (VZO), which depart adjacent to the station building.

== Gallery ==
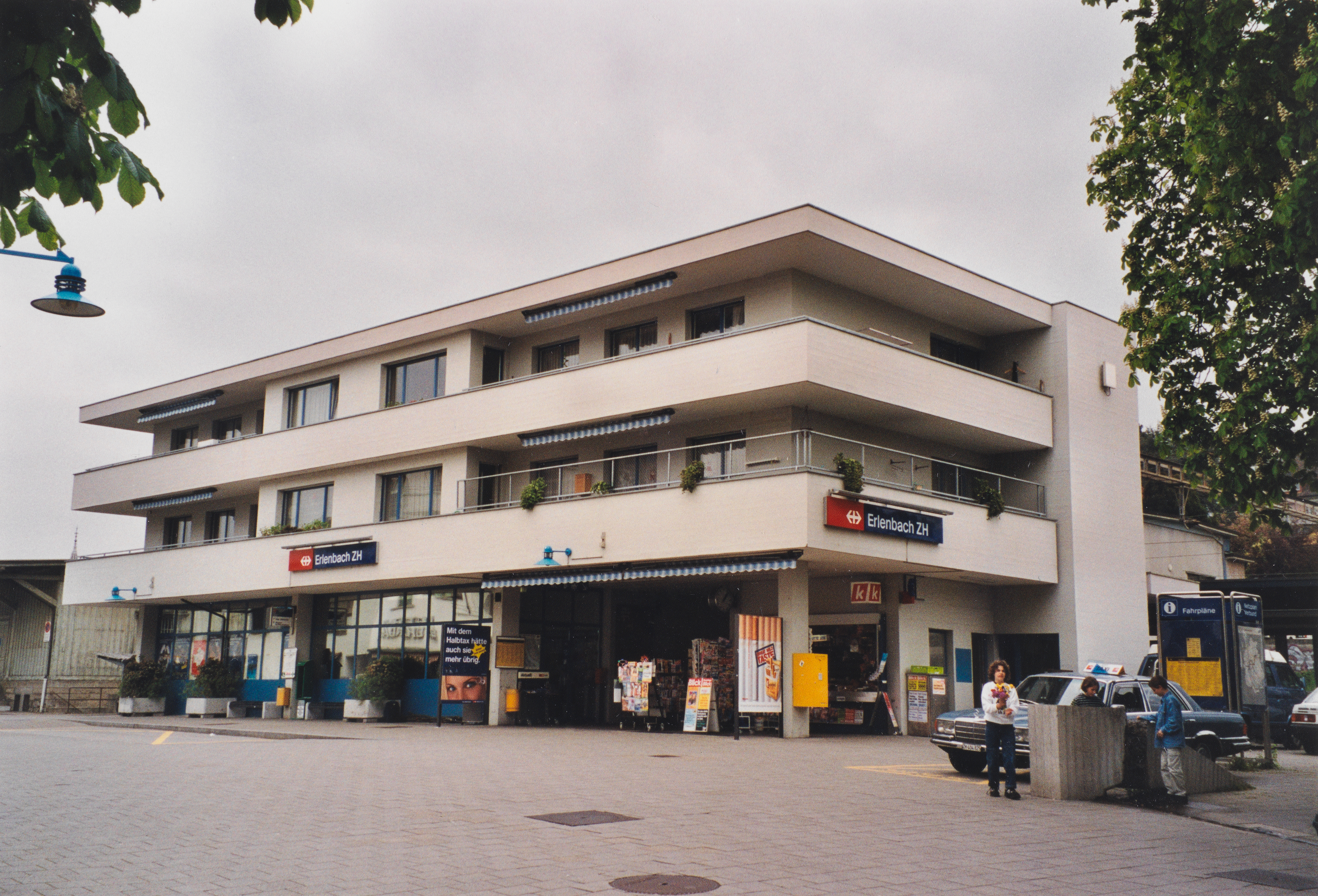
The station building in 2001

== See also ==
- Rail transport in Switzerland
