= Goldbach, Zurich =

Coordinates: 47.2679°N 8.8905°E

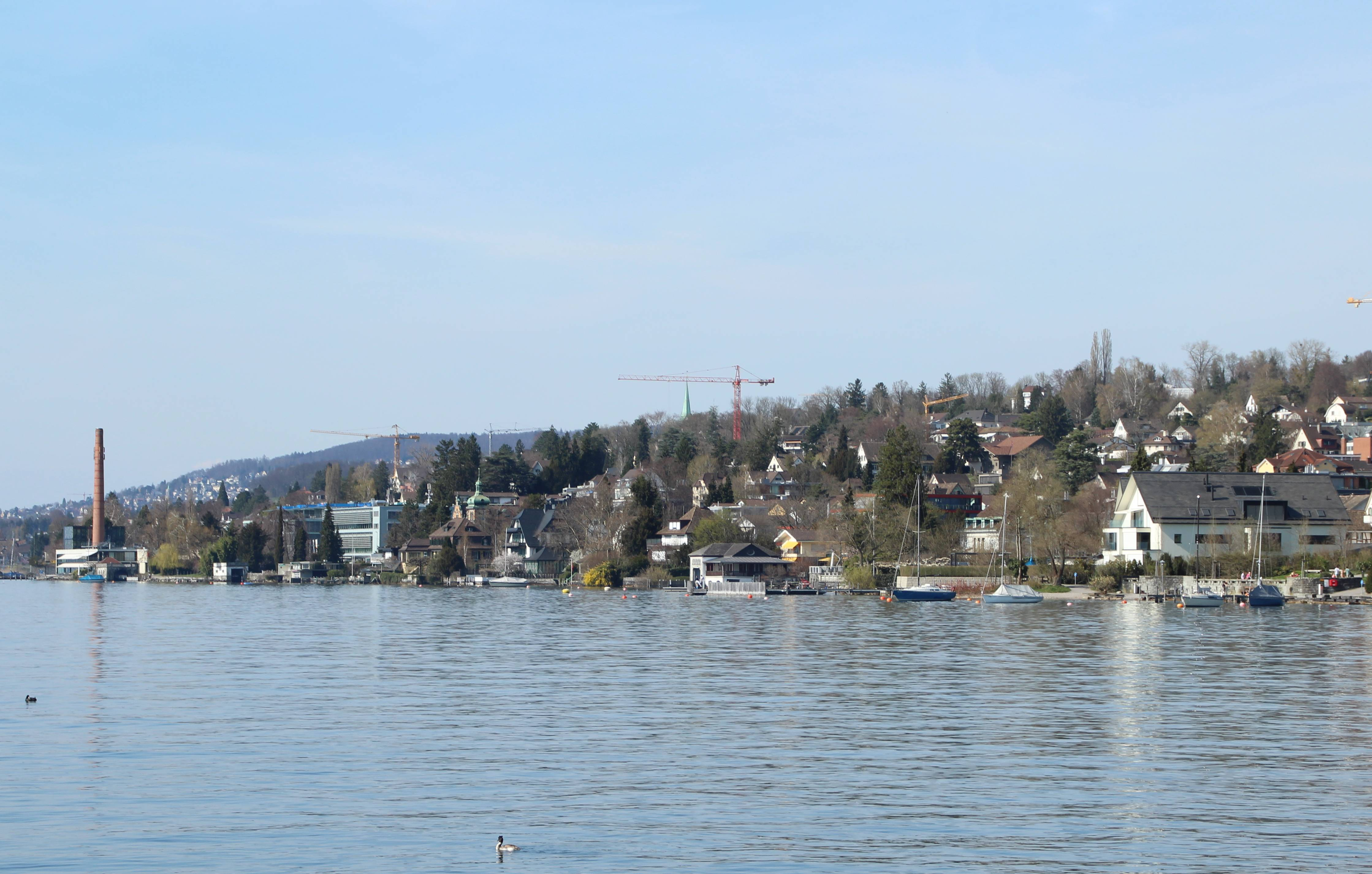
Küsnacht Goldbach

Goldbach is part of the municipality of Küsnacht in the district of Meilen in the canton of Zürich in Switzerland. Goldbach is located north of Küsnacht proper, south and west of Zollikon, and on the Goldküste (Gold Coast) of Lake Zürich.

The Küsnacht-Goldbach railway station is 12–14 minutes from downtown Zurich via the S6 and S16 S-Bahn train lines.

Goldbach is home to the Goldbach Center and Goldbach Media AG.
