= Küsnacht ZH railway station =

Railway station in Canton of Zürich, Switzerland

Küsnacht ZH
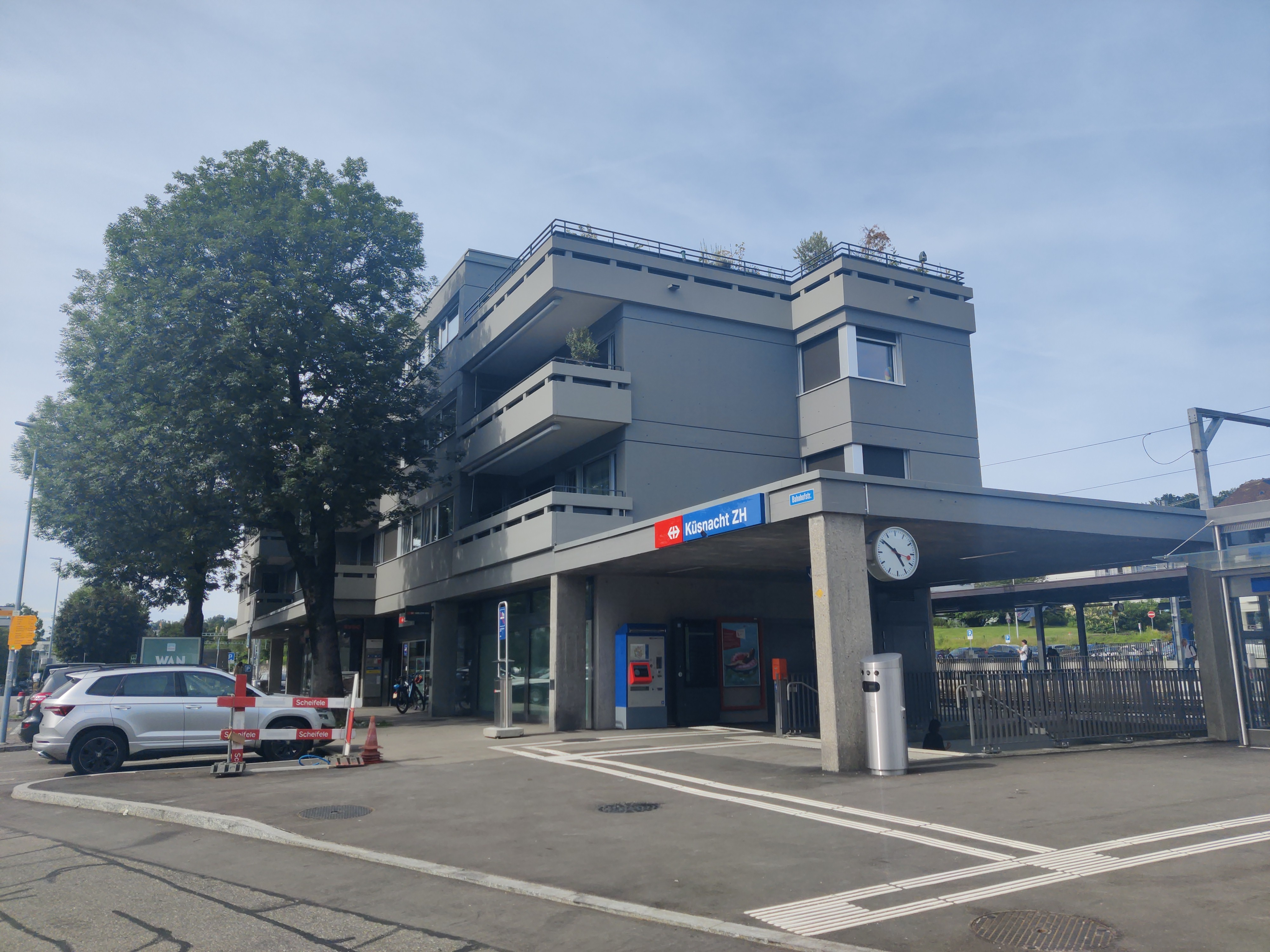
- The station building in 2024

General information
- Location: Küsnacht, Canton of Zurich, Switzerland
- Coordinates: 47.31932°N 8.580698°E
- Elevation: 415 m (1,362 ft)
- Owner: Swiss Federal Railways
- Operator: Swiss Federal Railways
- Line: Lake Zurich right bank line
- Platforms: 1 island platform
- Tracks: 2
- Connections: ZVV
- Ship: ZSG boat lines
- Bus: AZZK regional buses 918 919
- Airport: Zurich S-Bahn service S16 to/from Zürich Airport in 0:28h

Construction
- Parking: yes

Other information
- Fare zone: ZVV 140

Services
Preceding station	Zurich S-Bahn	Following station
Küsnacht Goldbach towards Baden	S6	Erlenbach ZH towards Uetikon
Küsnacht Goldbach towards Zurich Airport	S16	Erlenbach ZH towards Herrliberg-Feldmeilen
Zürich Stadelhofen towards Zürich Hardbrücke	S20 Limited service	Meilen towards Uerikon
Küsnacht Goldbach towards Bassersdorf	SN7 Limited service	Erlenbach ZH towards Stäfa
Location
- Location within Switzerland Location within Canton of Zürich

Küsnacht is a railway station in Switzerland, situated near to the eastern bank of Lake Zurich (Goldcoast) in the municipality of Küsnacht in the canton of Zurich (abbreviated to ZH). The station is on the Lake Zurich right bank railway line. It is located within fare zone 140 of the Zürcher Verkehrsverbund (ZVV).

It is one of four railway stations in the municipality of Küsnacht, the other being Küsnacht Goldbach, located on the same line, and Forch and Neue Forch, both located on the Forch Railway line.

== Services ==
The station is served by the following S-Bahn trains:

- Zurich S-Bahn:
  - S6 Baden AG–Regensdorf-Watt–Hardbrücke–Zürich HB–Uetikon
  - S16 Zürich Flughafen –Hardbrücke–Zürich HB–Herrliberg-Feldmeilen (–Meilen)
    Extended in the evening to Meilen.
  - S20 Uerikon–Zürich HB–Hardbrücke
    Operates only during rush hour; stops between Männedorf and Stadelhofen only in Meilen and Küsnacht ZH.
- Nighttime S-Bahn (only during weekends):
  - SN7: hourly service between Bassersdorf and Stäfa (via Zürich HB)

== Gallery ==
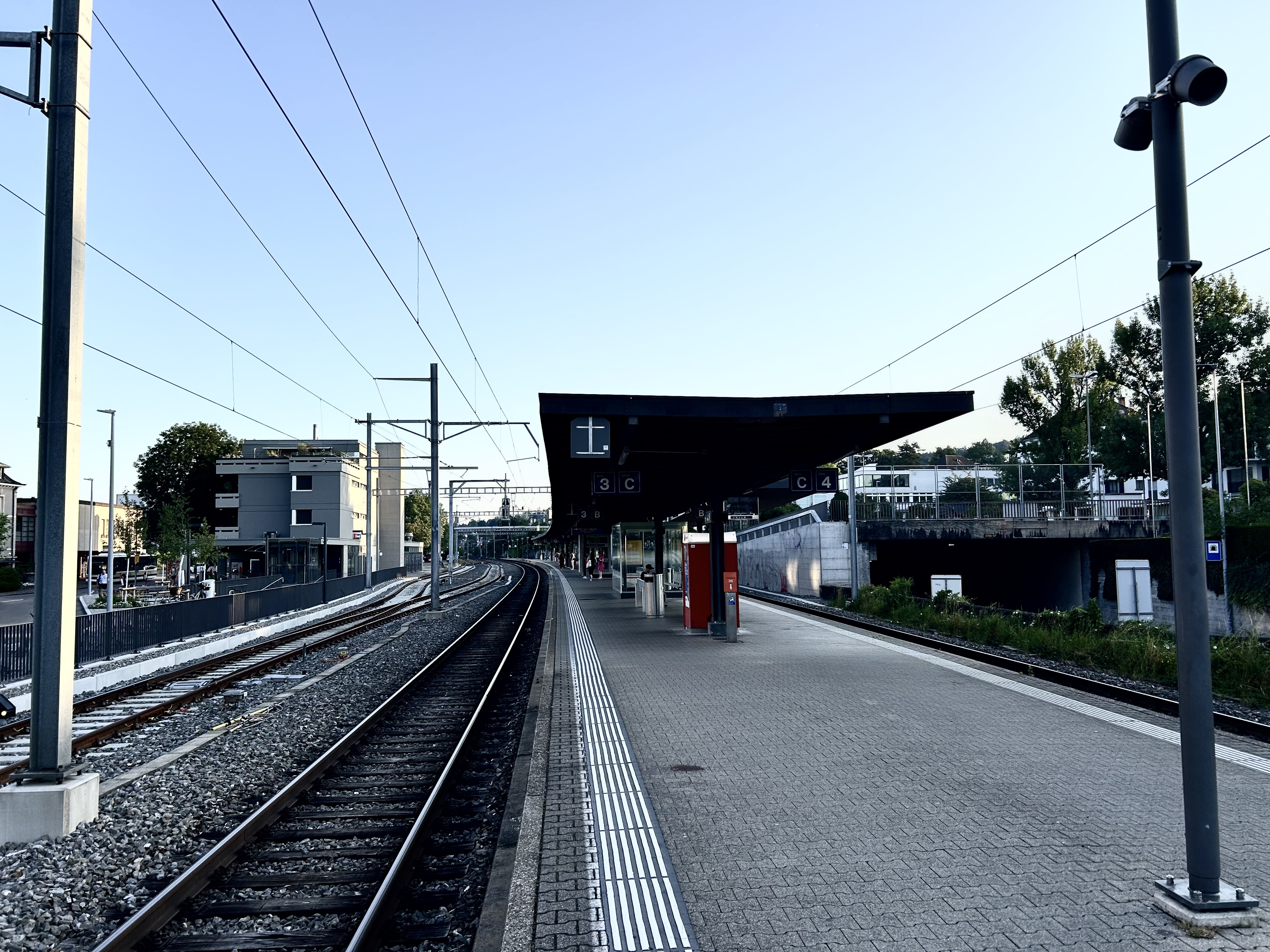
Platforms at Küsnacht ZH station

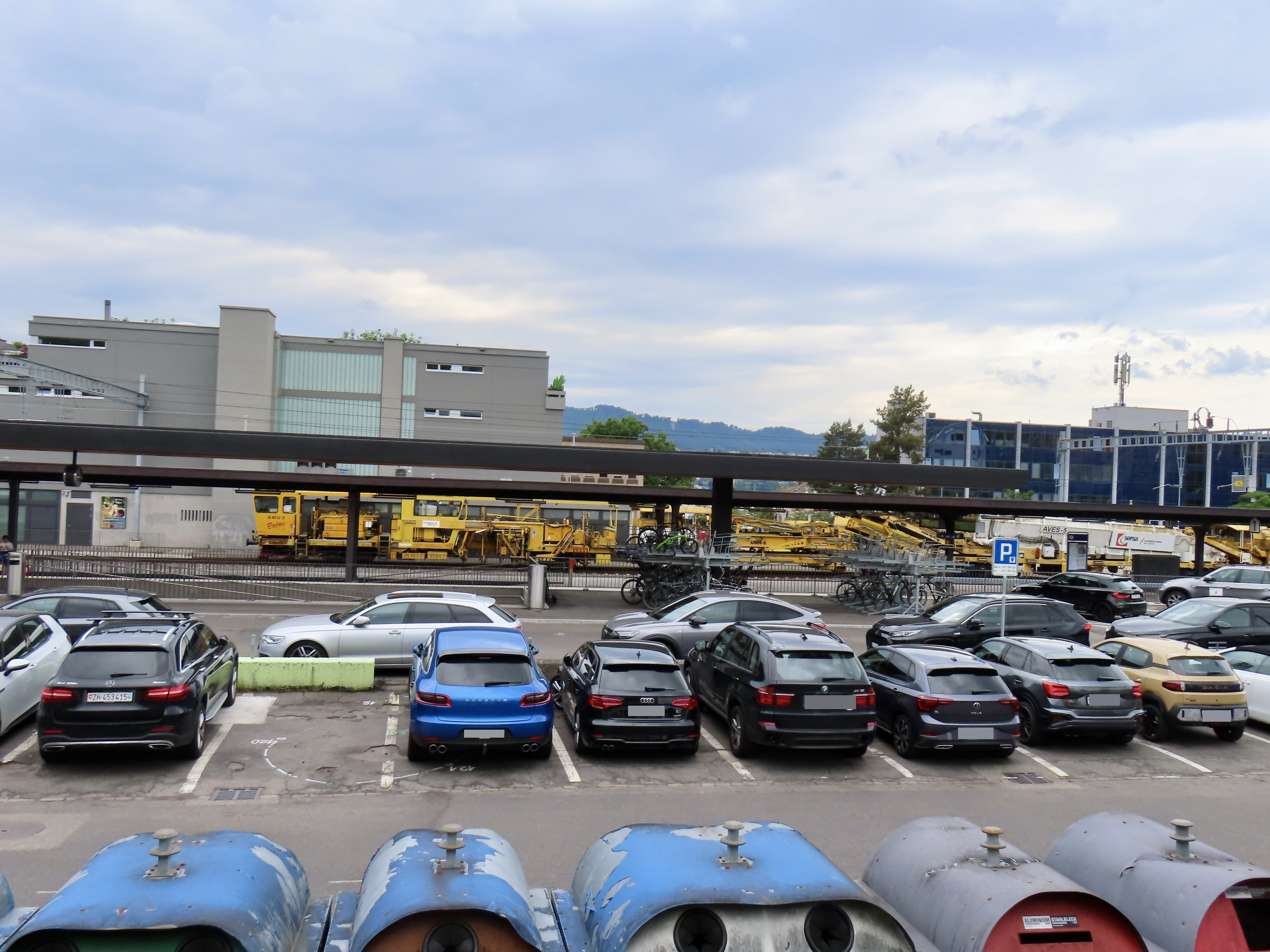
Parking lot adjacent to the railway station

== See also ==
- Rail transport in Switzerland
