= SBB RABe 514 =

Swiss rolling stock class

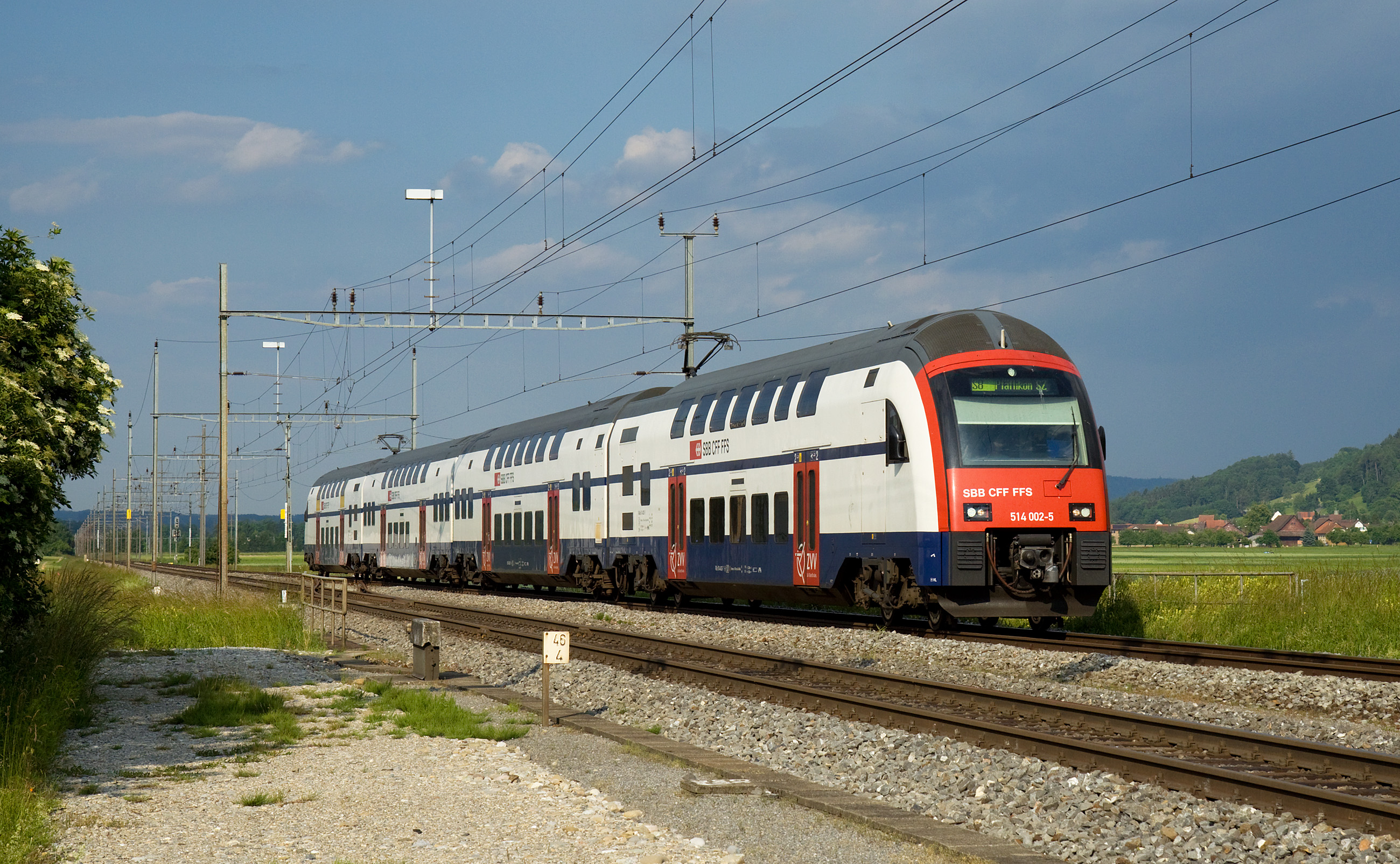
- RABe 514 as S8 service near Felben-Wellhausen in 2009

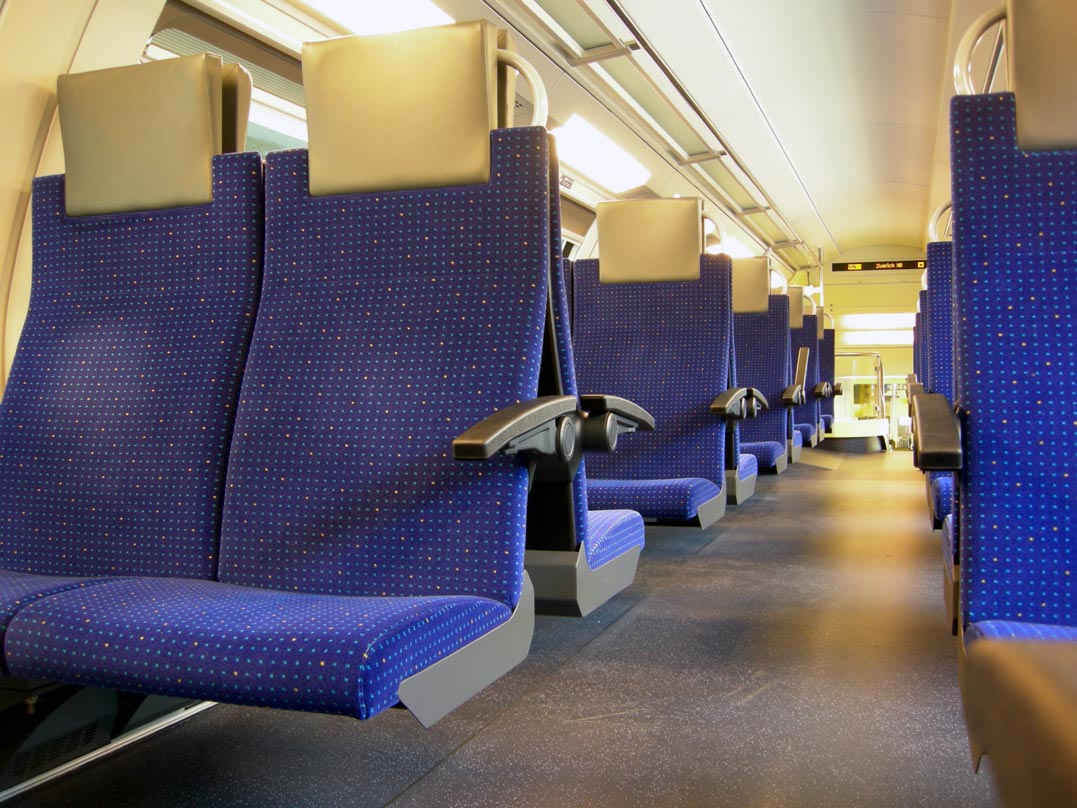
- Second class seats on the upper deck
- Manufacturers: Siemens Transportation Systems; Stadler Rail
- Family name: Siemens Desiro Double Deck
- Constructed: 2005–2009
- Entered service: 2006
- Number built: 61
- Fleet numbers: 514 001–514 061
- Capacity: First class: 74; Second class: 304
- Owner: Swiss Federal Railways
- Line served: S2 S6 S8 S16 S24

Specifications
- Train length: 100 m (328 ft 1 in)
- Width: 2.780 m (9 ft 1.4 in)
- Height: 4.6 m (15 ft 1 in)
- Floor height: 600 mm (24 in)
- Doors: 8 on each side
- Maximum speed: 140 km/h (87 mph)
- Weight: 225 tonnes (496,000 lb)
- Power output: 3,200 kW (4,290 hp)
- Acceleration: 1.1 m/s^{2} (3.6 ft/s^{2})
- Electric system: 15 kV 16.7 Hz AC
- Current collection: Pantograph
- UIC classification: Bo′Bo′+2′2′+2′2′+Bo′Bo′
- Track gauge: 1,435 mm (4 ft 8 1/2 in)

The RABe 514 is a class of four-car double-decker electric multiple unit used by the Swiss Federal Railways (SBB) for the Zurich S-Bahn. It is part of the Siemens Desiro Double Deck product family. The trains are also referred to as DTZ, which stands for the German word Doppelstocktriebzug (lit. 'double decker multiple unit').

== History ==
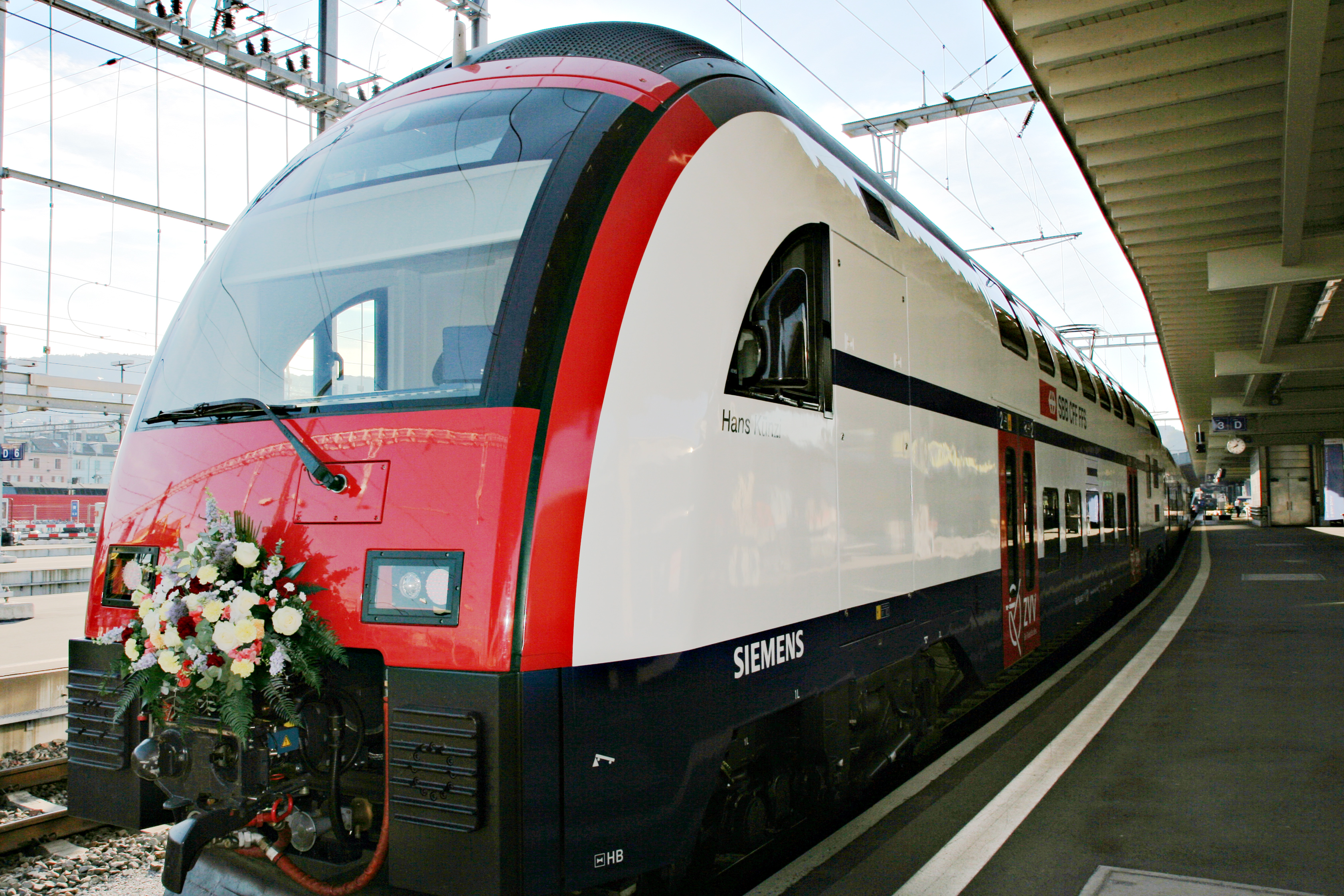
RABe 514 at its inauguration ceremony at Zürich Hauptbahnhof on 10 June 2006

On 23 February 2003 the Swiss Federal Railways' board of directors decided to give the 447 million CHF contract for building 35 double decker trains to Siemens Transportation Systems. This decision came as a surprise since Siemens had never built double-decker EMUs before, except for an experimental train built in a consortium with DWA Görlitz (now Bombardier Transportation) that never entered into service. To fulfill the domestic content requirement in the contract, Siemens reached an agreement with Stadler Rail to perform some of the assembling and the commissioning in their factory in Altenrhein, Switzerland.

The trains were originally intended to enter service in December 2005, but the date could not be kept. Nevertheless, the first trainset was presented to the public on 2 December 2005 at Zürich Hauptbahnhof. Until May of the next year, the RABe 514 were thoroughly tested and then entered into regular passenger service on the S14 line.

In March 2006, the Swiss Federal Railways exercised their purchase option for another 25 units. Because of the delayed delivery of the first trainsets, Siemens agreed to build an additional train instead of paying a penalty. Delivery of all 61 trains was completed in July 2009.

== Specifications ==
The DTZ trains are the second generation double decker trains used on the Zurich S-Bahn. Compared to the Re 450-hauled bilevel coaches, the first generation trainsets known as DPZ, the RABe 514 feature a low-level entrance for level boarding, air conditioning and vacuum toilets (in a washroom suitable for the disabled). The third generation trains of the Zurich S-Bahn are RABe 511 EMUs of Stadler Rail.

The four-car DTZ multiple unit consists of two powered end cars with two unpowered cars between them. Both bogies in an end car are driven by induction motors with a power output of 400 kW (536 hp) per axle providing a total of 3,200 kW (4,291 hp) for the trainset. Since there was not enough space for a 15 kV power line through the train, both end cars draw their power from a separate pantograph.

An automatic coupling system allows for up to four trainset to be connected together for additional capacity during peak-hours; however, in practice the maximum is three connected trains due to the limited platform lengths of 300 m (984 ft 3 in) at the train stations.

=== Interior ===
The double decker trains provide 74 seats in first class, 304 seats in second class as well room for about 600 people standing. The first class seats are equipped with normal 230 V power outlets for charging notebooks and other devices.

== Service ==
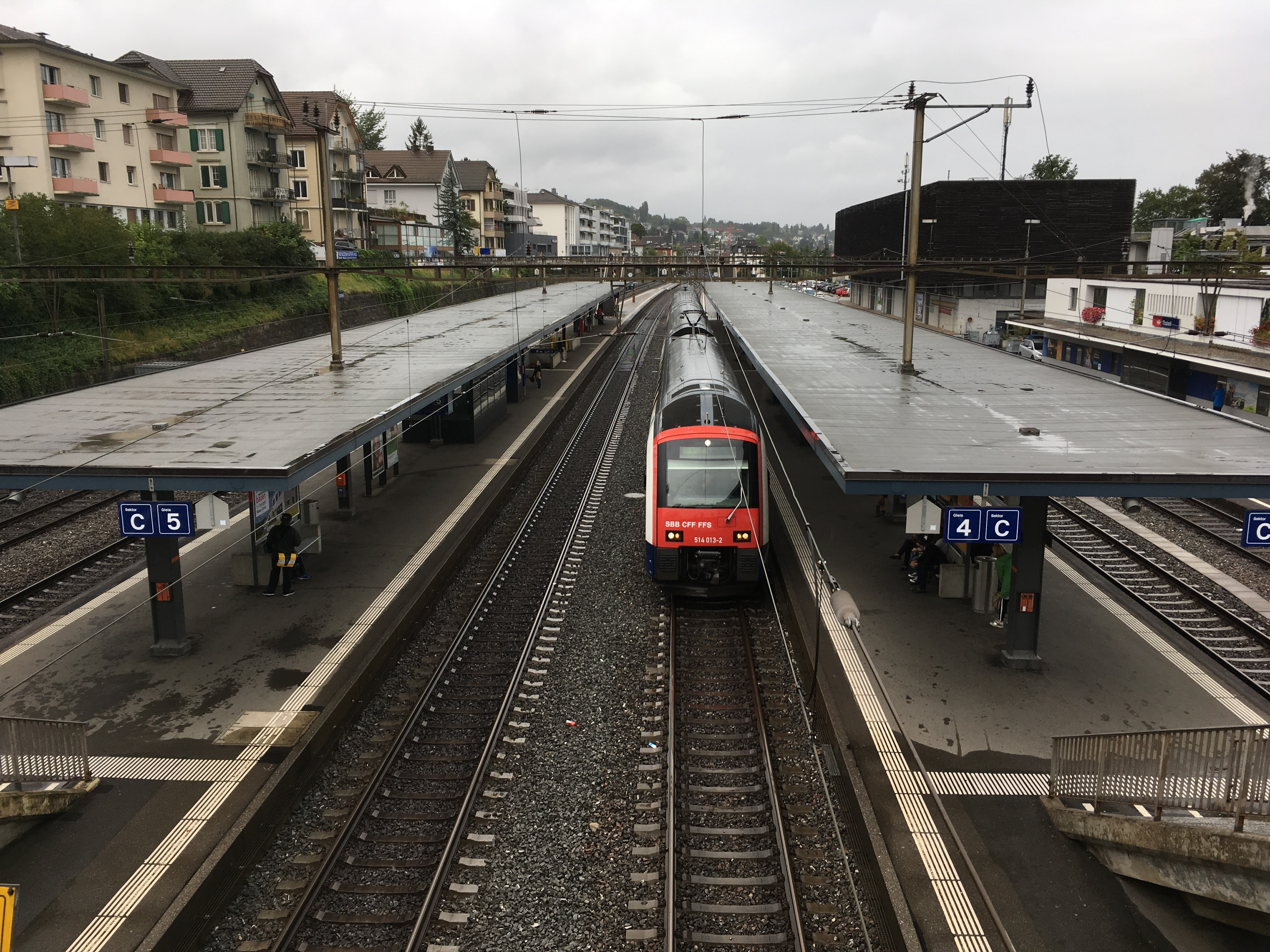
Unit 514 013-2 in Thalwil

The RABe 514 are used on lines previously served by DPZ trainsets. The thereby freed up DPZ were then used to replace the old single deck trains RABDe 510 and RBe 540 from the 1960s.

The first line served by the new Siemens trains was the S14 (Hinwil–Zürich Hauptbahnhof). Starting in December 2006 the S7 (Rapperswil–Zürich–Winterthur) line was also equipped with the DTZ. However, all newly delivered trains were first put on the S14 line because that line is better suited for testing due to its short length and lower importance than other lines. After the S7 line got all of its required 15 trainsets, the next trains were intended to go to the S5 line, but that plan was abandoned in favor of the S15 (Affoltern am Albis-Zürich-Rapperswil). With delivery of the second batch, the S8 (Pfäffikon-Zürich-Winterthur) line was equipped as well. The former S16 (Meilen-Zürich-Thayngen) also used DTZ trains.

The use of DTZ was changed after a major overhaul of the Zurich S-Bahn network between 2014 and 2018. As of the December 2022 timetable change, the RABe 514 is primarily used on five Zürich S-Bahn routes: S2, S6, S8, S16 and S24.

The original plan to couple first and second generation trains together to provide level-boarding on more lines could not be implemented due to software problems when connecting the two train generations.

== Naming and special livery ==
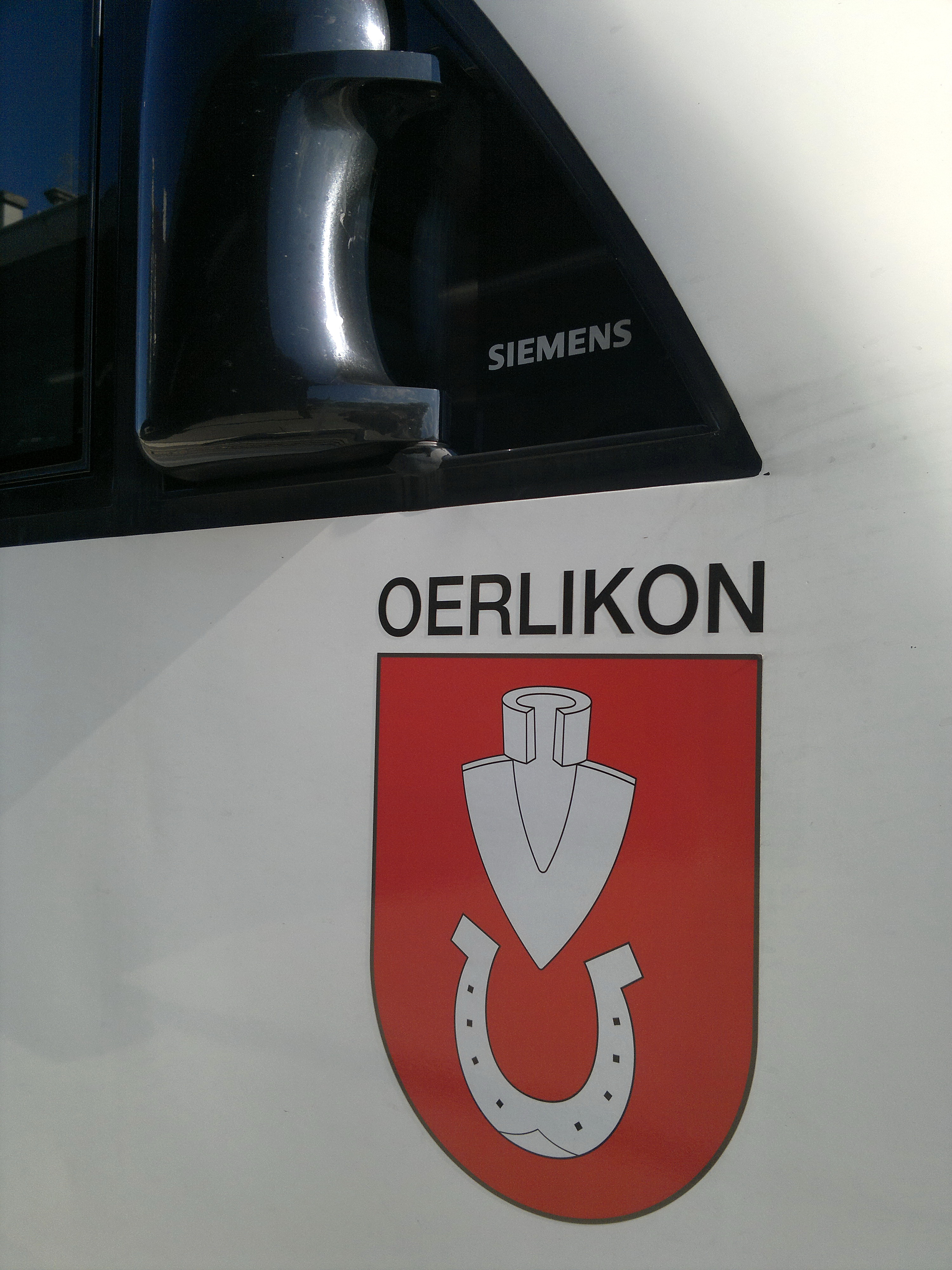
Name and coat of arms of Oerlikon on a RABe 514

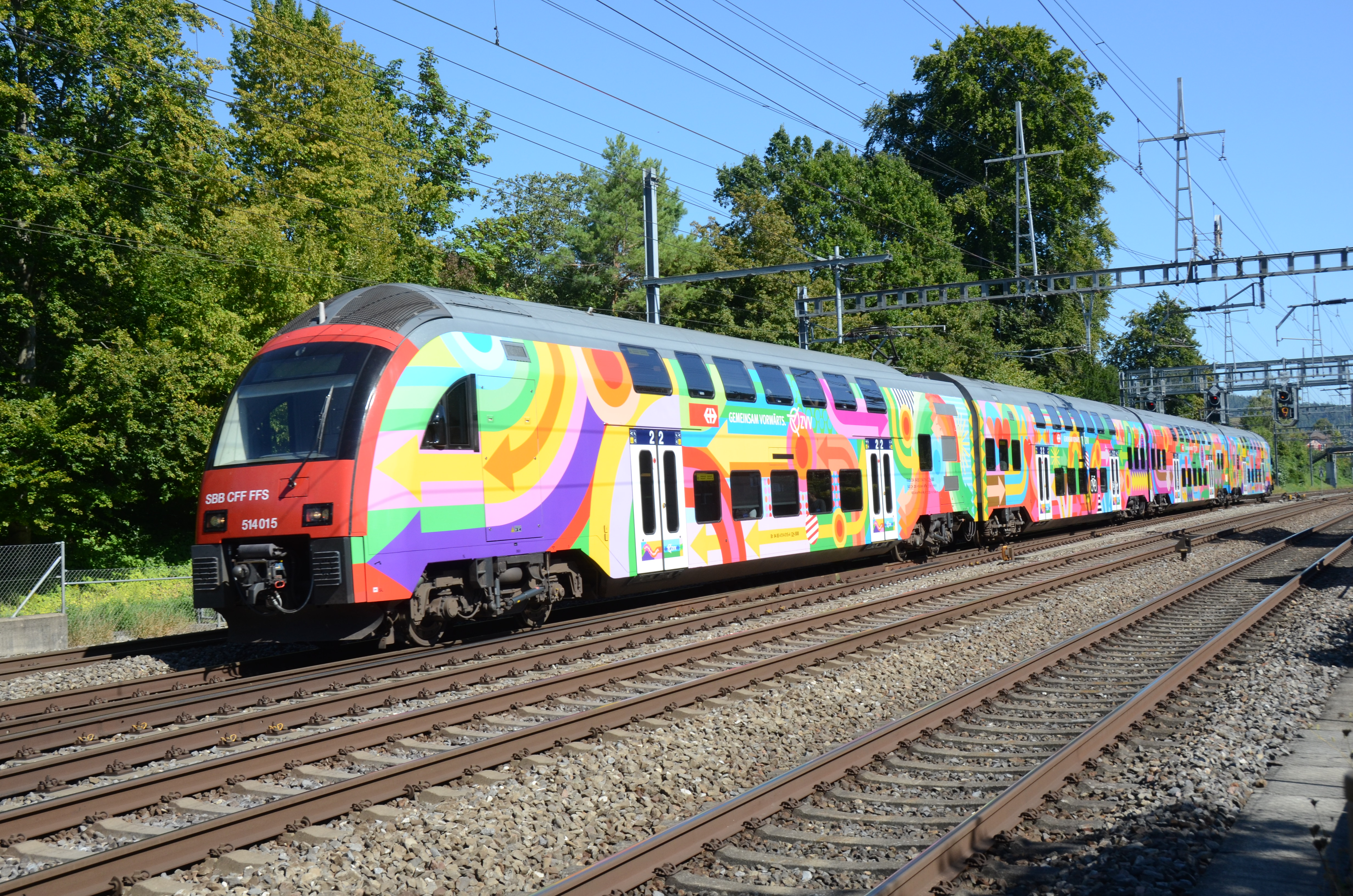
RABe 514 015 with ZVV special livery in 2023

It is common practice in Switzerland to name electric multiple units (e.g. RABe 501, RABDe 500) and locomotives (e.g. Ae 6/6, Re 6/6, Re 450, Re 460). Similarly, some RABe 514 trainsets were named, mostly after communes (or former communes), in which case the commune's coat of arms is also indicated at both ends of the trainset. The table below lists all named units:

EMU №	Name
514 006	Hans Künzi
514 007	Bülach
514 012	Russikon
514 016	Schaffhausen
514 017	Wetzikon
514 022	Frauenfeld Weinfelden
514 023	Anton Rogger
514 027	Lufingen
514 030	Regensdorf
514 043	Neuhausen am Rheinfall
514 050	Züri West
514 052	Wipkingen
514 059	Elsau
514 060	Oerlikon

In addition, RABe 514 015 currently has the ZVV special livery.

== Accidents and incidents ==
On 20 February 2015, unit № 514 046-2 was involved in a collision with an InterRegio express train hauled by Class 460 electric locomotive (№ 460 087) at Rafz.
