= Winkel am Zürichsee railway station =

Railway station in Canton of Zürich, Switzerland

Winkel am Zürichsee
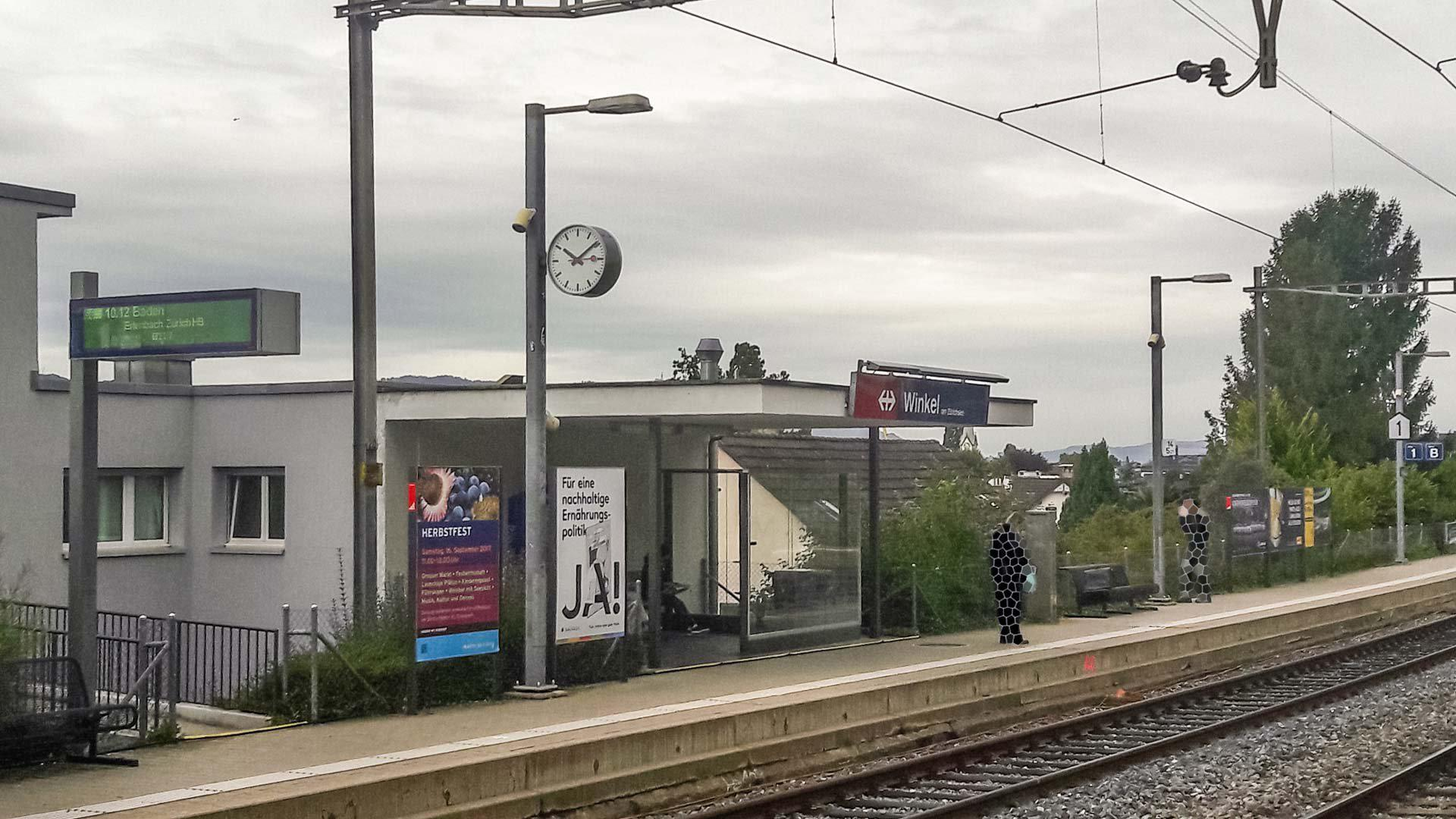
- The station in 2017

General information
- Location: Winkel am Zürichsee, Erlenbach, Canton of Zurich, Switzerland
- Coordinates: 47.297372°N 8.598921°E
- Elevation: 520 m (1,710 ft)
- Owner: Swiss Federal Railways
- Operator: Swiss Federal Railways
- Line: Lake Zurich right bank line
- Platforms: 2 side platforms
- Tracks: 2

Other information
- Fare zone: ZVV 140

Services
Preceding station	Zurich S-Bahn	Following station
Erlenbach ZH towards Baden	S6	Herrliberg-Feldmeilen towards Uetikon
Erlenbach ZH towards Zurich Airport	S16	Herrliberg-Feldmeilen Terminus
Erlenbach ZH towards Bassersdorf	SN7 Limited service	Herrliberg-Feldmeilen towards Stäfa
Location
- Location within Switzerland Location within Canton of Zürich

Winkel am Zürichsee (lit. 'Winkel on Lake Zurich') is a railway station in Switzerland, situated near the eastern bank of Lake Zurich (Goldcoast), in the Winkel section of the municipality of Erlenbach. The station is on the Lake Zurich right bank railway line, within fare zone 140 of the Zürcher Verkehrsverbund (ZVV).

The station is one of two railway stations in the municipality of Erlenbach, the other being Erlenbach ZH.

== Services ==
As of the December 2024 timetable change, the station is served by the following S-Bahn trains:

- Zurich S-Bahn:
  - S6 Baden AG–Regensdorf-Watt–Hardbrücke–Zürich HB–Uetikon
  - S16 Zürich Flughafen –Hardbrücke–Zürich HB–Herrliberg-Feldmeilen (–Meilen)
    Extended in the evening to Meilen.

During weekends (Friday and Saturday nights), there is also a nighttime S-Bahn service (SN7) offered by ZVV.

- Nighttime S-Bahn (only during weekends):
  - SN7: hourly service between Bassersdorf and Stäfa (via Zürich HB)

== See also ==
- Rail transport in Switzerland
