= S16 (ZVV) =

Railway service in Switzerland

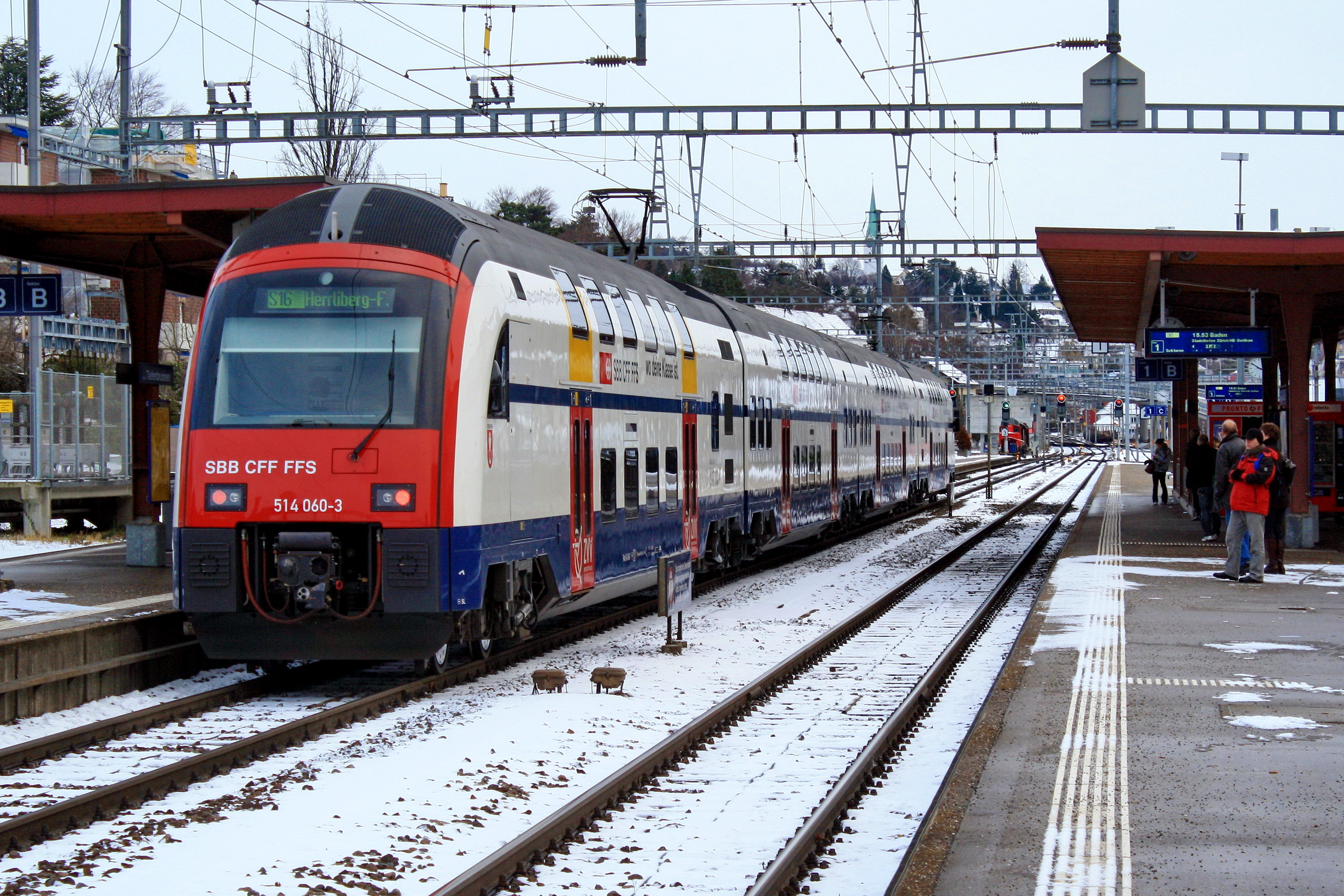
- An RABe 514 at Zurich Tiefenbrunnen heading towards Herrliberg-Feldmeilen.

Overview
- Status: Operational
- Locale: Zürich, Switzerland
- Termini: Zürich Flughafen; Meilen
- Stations: 12 (13)
- Website: ZVV (in English)

Service
- Type: S-Bahn service
- System: Zürich S-Bahn
- Operator(s): Zürcher Verkehrsverbund (ZVV)
- Rolling stock: RABe 514 class trains

Technical
- Track gauge: 1,435 mm (4 ft 8 1/2 in)

Zürich S-Bahn network as of December 2018

The S16 is a regional railway service of the S-Bahn Zürich on the Zürcher Verkehrsverbund (ZVV), Zürich transportation network, and is one of the network's services providing service within the canton of Zürich.

At Zürich HB, trains of the S16 service usually depart from underground tracks (Gleis) 41–44 (Museumstrasse station).

== Route ==
- S16 Zürich Flughafen –Hardbrücke–Zürich HB–Herrliberg-Feldmeilen (–Meilen)

The service links Zürich Flughafen to the north of Zürich, and Herrliberg-Feldmeilen, on north shore of Lake Zürich to the east of Zürich. The service runs via Zürich Oerlikon, Zürich Hauptbahnhof and Zürich Stadelhofen, and then over the Lake Zürich right-bank railway line to its terminus. At the southern end of the service, the S16 is extended to Meilen in the evenings. The following stations are served:

- Zürich Flughafen (indicated as Zürich on destination sign)
- Zürich Oerlikon
- Zürich Hardbrücke
- Zürich Hauptbahnhof
- Zürich Stadelhofen
- Zürich Tiefenbrunnen
- Zollikon
- Küsnacht Goldbach
- Küsnacht ZH
- Erlenbach ZH
- Winkel am Zürichsee
- Herrliberg-Feldmeilen
- Meilen

== Rolling stock ==
As of the December 2022 timetable change, all services are operated with RABe 514 class trains.

== Scheduling ==
The normal frequency is one train every 30 minutes. A journey between Zurich Airport and Herrliberg-Feldmeilen takes 34 minutes, with an additional 7 minutes when extended to Meilen. Between Zürich Oerlikon and Herrliberg-Feldmeilen, the S16 combines with the S6 to provide a frequency of one train every 15 minutes.

== History ==
Prior to a change in late 2015, the S16 extended beyond Zürich Flughafen to Effretikon, with alternate trains extended to Thayngen, in the canton of Schaffhausen, running via Winterthur Hauptbahnhof and Schaffhausen. In 2015, service over this stretch of the route was transferred to the S24 service, and the S16 cut back to the airport.

== See also ==
- Rail transport in Switzerland
- List of railway stations in Zurich
- Public transport in Zurich
- ZVV fare zones
