= Meilen railway station =

Railway station in Meilen, Switzerland

Meilen
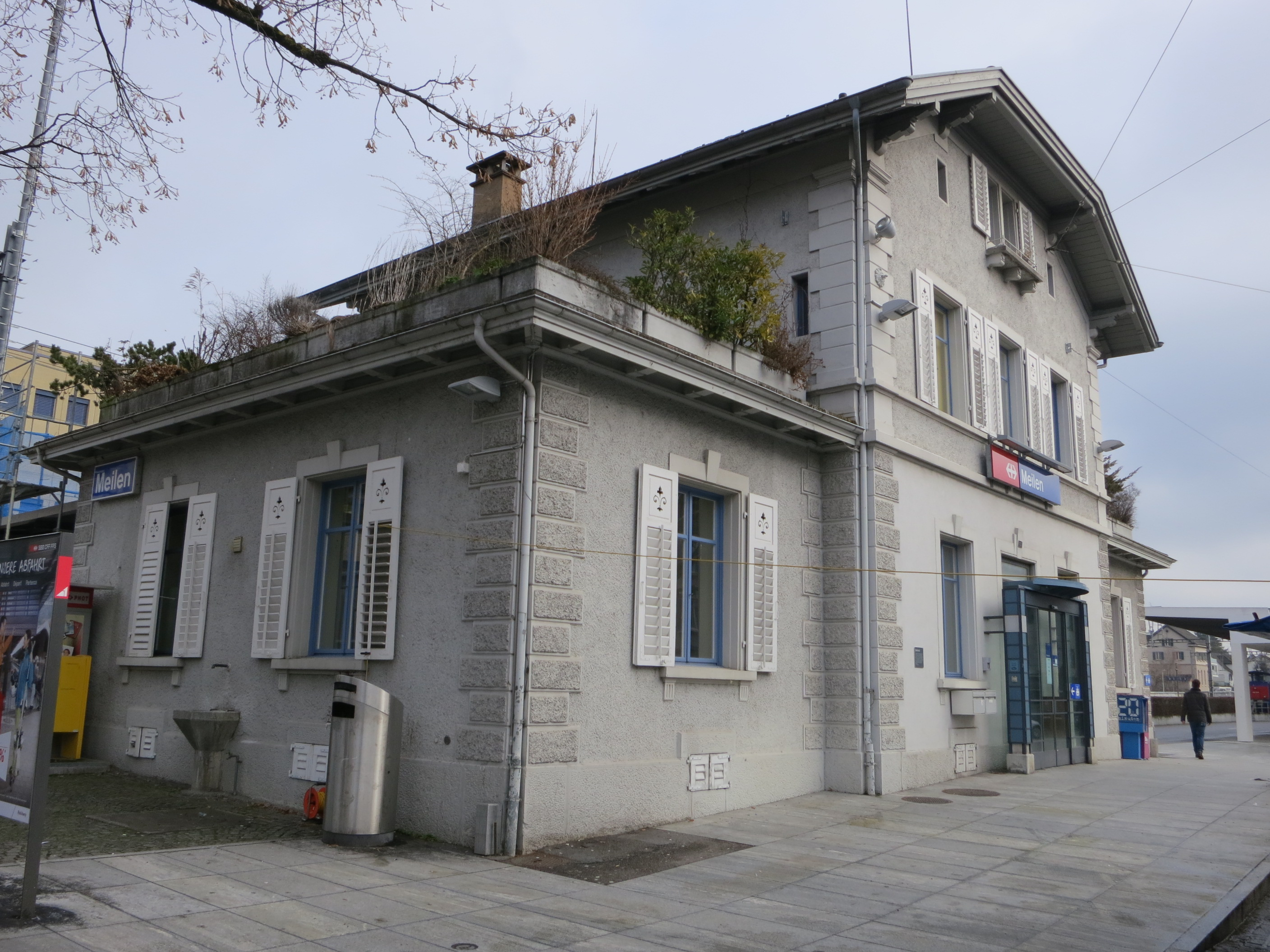

General information
- Location: Bahnhofstrasse, Meilen, Canton of Zürich, Switzerland
- Coordinates: 47.269522°N 8.644266°E
- Elevation: 420 m (1,380 ft)
- Owner: Swiss Federal Railways
- Operator: Swiss Federal Railways
- Line: Lake Zurich right bank line
- Platforms: 1 island platform
- Tracks: 5
- Connections: ZVV
- Ship: ZSG passenger ships; Horgen–Meilen car ferry
- Bus: VZO bus routes 921 922 923 925

Construction
- Architect: Gustav Wülfke (1893)

Other information
- Fare zone: ZVV 141

Services
Preceding station	Zurich S-Bahn	Following station
Herrliberg-Feldmeilen towards Baden	S6	Uetikon Terminus
Zürich Stadelhofen towards Winterthur	S7	Uetikon towards Rapperswil
Herrliberg-Feldmeilen towards Zurich Airport	S16 Limited service	Terminus
Küsnacht ZH towards Zürich Hardbrücke	S20 Limited service	Männedorf towards Uerikon
Herrliberg-Feldmeilen towards Bassersdorf	SN7 Limited service	Uetikon towards Stäfa
Location
- Location within Switzerland Location within Canton of Zürich

Meilen is a railway station in the Swiss canton of Zurich, situated in the municipality of Meilen on the eastern shore of Lake Zurich (Goldcoast). The station is located on the Lake Zurich right bank railway line, within fare zone 141 of the Zürcher Verkehrsverbund (ZVV).

== Services ==
=== Rail ===
As of the December 2024 timetable change, the station is served by the following S-Bahn trains:

- Zurich S-Bahn:
  - S6 Baden AG–Regensdorf-Watt–Hardbrücke–Zürich HB–Uetikon
  - S7 Winterthur–Kloten–Hardbrücke–Zürich HB–Meilen–Rapperswil
    Operates non stop between Stadelhofen and Meilen, Winterthur and Effretikon, stops in Kemptthal as of 9:20 PM.
  - S16 Zürich Flughafen –Hardbrücke–Zürich HB–Herrliberg-Feldmeilen (–Meilen)
    Extended in the evening to Meilen.
  - S20 Uerikon–Zürich HB–Hardbrücke
    Operates only during rush hour; stops between Männedorf and Stadelhofen only in Meilen and Küsnacht ZH.

During weekends (Friday and Saturday nights), there is also a nighttime S-Bahn service (SN7) offered by ZVV.

- Nighttime S-Bahn (only during weekends):
  - SN7: hourly service between Bassersdorf and Stäfa (via Zürich HB)

=== Bus ===
A regional bus terminal is adjacent to the railway station, served by buses of the Verkehrsbetriebe Zürichsee und Oberland (VZO).

=== Boat and ferry ===
Passenger ships of the Zürichsee-Schifffahrtsgesellschaft (ZSG), and the Horgen–Meilen car ferry, operate from lakeside terminals some 600 metres (2,000 ft) to the south of the railway station. ZSG boats operate either in direction to Zurich Bürkliplatz or Rapperswil/Schmerikon, serving the terminals of several lakeside towns and Ufenau island en route. The car ferry links Meilen with the town of Horgen on the opposite side of the lake.

== History ==
The station was opened in 1893, at the same time as the Lake Zurich right bank line.

In 1903, Meilen station became the interchange point with the Wetzikon-Meilen-Bahn (WMB), a newly built metre gauge electric tramway that served the Zürcher Oberland area inland from the lake. The WMB originally ran beyond Meilen station, to terminate at the lakeside, but this section closed in 1931 leaving the station as the line's terminus. The WMB closed in 1950.

== See also ==
- Rail transport in Switzerland
