= Herrliberg-Feldmeilen railway station =

Railway station in Canton of Zürich, Switzerland

Herrliberg-Feldmeilen
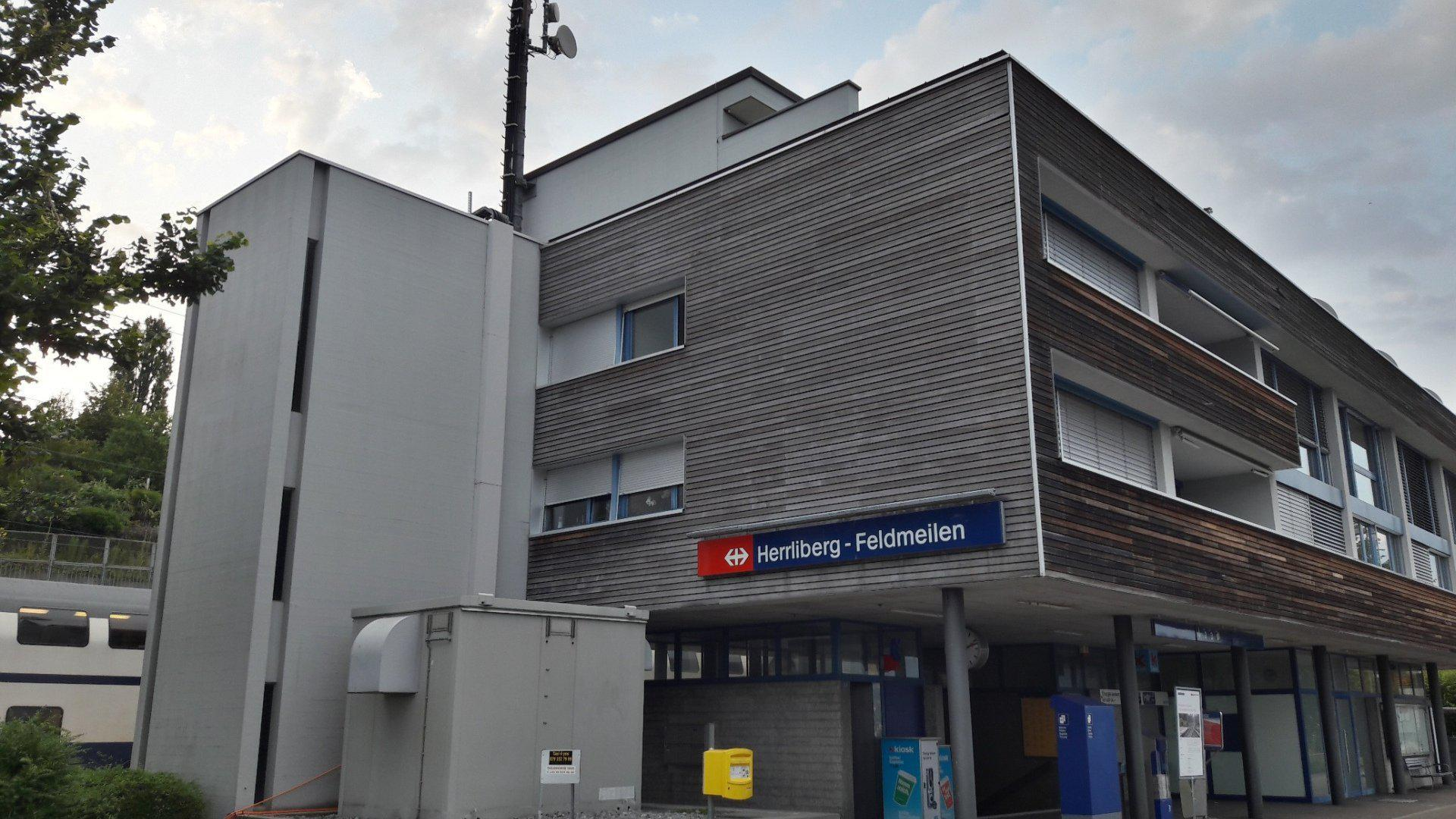
- The station building in 2018

General information
- Location: Feldmeilen, Meilen; Canton of Zurich, Switzerland
- Coordinates: 47.281467°N 8.613195°E
- Elevation: 423 m (1,388 ft)
- Owner: Swiss Federal Railways
- Operator: Swiss Federal Railways
- Line: Lake Zurich right bank line
- Platforms: 1 island platform
- Tracks: 3
- Connections: VZO buses 921 972

Other information
- Fare zone: ZVV 141

Services
Preceding station	Zurich S-Bahn	Following station
Winkel am Zürichsee towards Baden	S6	Meilen towards Uetikon
Winkel am Zürichsee towards Zurich Airport	S16	Meilen Limited service Terminus
Winkel am Zürichsee towards Bassersdorf	SN7 Limited service	Meilen towards Stäfa
Location
- Location within Switzerland Location within Canton of Zürich

Herrliberg-Feldmeilen is a railway station in Switzerland, situated near the eastern bank of Lake Zurich (Goldcoast). The station is located adjacent to the village of Feldmeilen in the municipality of Meilen but, as its name suggests, also serves the adjacent municipality of Herrliberg. The station is on the Lake Zurich right bank railway line, within fare zone 141 of the Zürcher Verkehrsverbund (ZVV).

== Services ==
As of the December 2024 timetable change, the station is served by the following S-Bahn trains:

- Zurich S-Bahn:
  - S6 Baden AG–Regensdorf-Watt–Hardbrücke–Zürich HB–Uetikon
  - S16 Zürich Flughafen –Hardbrücke–Zürich HB–Herrliberg-Feldmeilen (–Meilen)
    Extended in the evening to Meilen.

During weekends (Friday and Saturday nights), there is also a nighttime S-Bahn service (SN7) offered by ZVV.

- Nighttime S-Bahn (only during weekends):
  - SN7: hourly service between Bassersdorf and Stäfa (via Zürich HB)

The station is also served by two bus routes of Verkehrsbetriebe Zürichsee und Oberland (VZO), which depart adjacent to the station building.

== Gallery ==
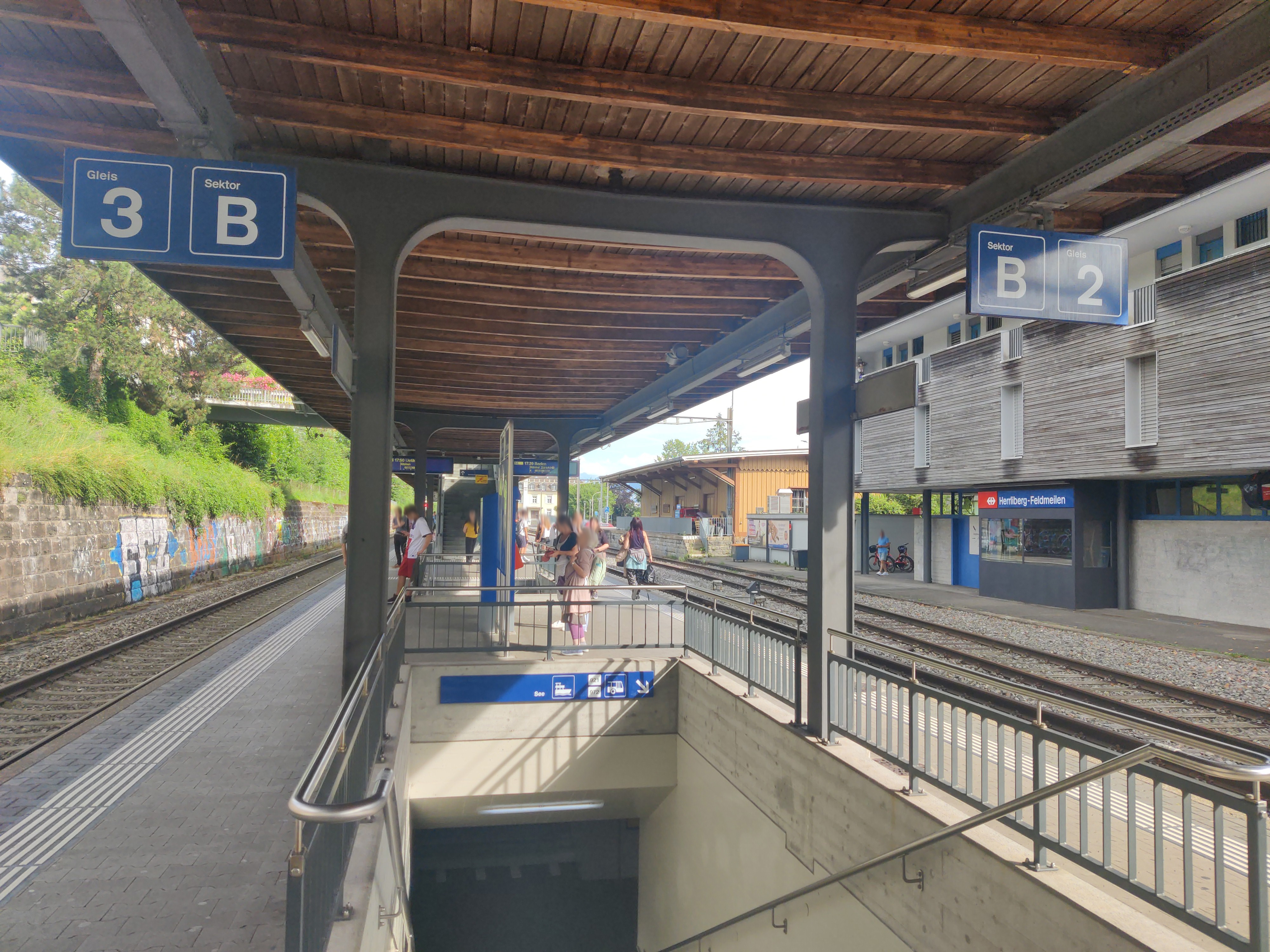
The station's platform and tracks

== See also ==
- Rail transport in Switzerland
