= Gold Coast (Switzerland) =

Eastern shore of Lake Zurich, Switzerland

Coordinates: 47°17′53″N 8°36′19″E

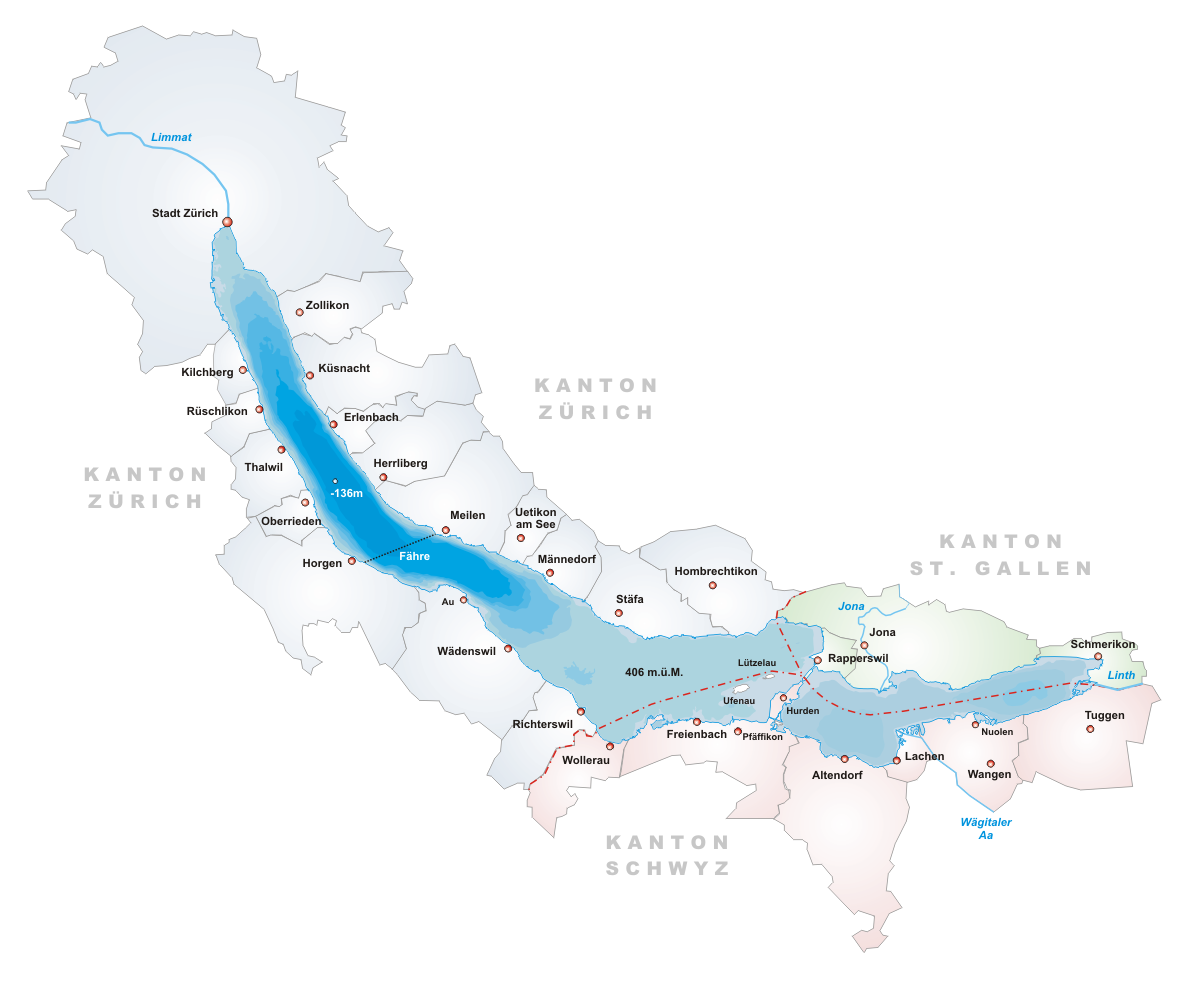
Lake Zurich

The Swiss Gold Coast (German: Goldküste) is the name given to the right shore of Lake Zurich in the Canton of Zurich. (Note: The left and right shores are defined with reference to the Linth river, which enters the lake at its southeasterly end and flows out through the city of Zurich at the northwesterly end, at which point it is known as the Limmat.) This prosperous region lies on the northeastern shore of the lake and thus benefits from the evening sun. The Gold Coast is noted for its low tax rates and high property prices. The sunny southwestern slopes of the Pfannenstiel mountain are given over to wine growing.

The opposite shore, however, is derisively dubbed ‘the Sniffle Coast’ (Swiss German dialect ‘Pfnüselküste’) because its topography and northeasterly aspect mean that it lies in the shadow of its own mountains – a state of affairs which often occurs in the early winter evenings and in contrast to the Gold Coast, which remains bathed in sunshine.

== Municipalities ==
The following municipalities are situated on the Gold Coast (from north to south):

- Zollikon
- Küsnacht
- Erlenbach
- Herrliberg
- Meilen
- Uetikon am See
- Männedorf
- Stäfa

All of the above are within the district of Meilen. The rest of the right shore of Lake Zurich is sometimes also referred to as being on the Gold Coast.

== Gold Coast railway line ==
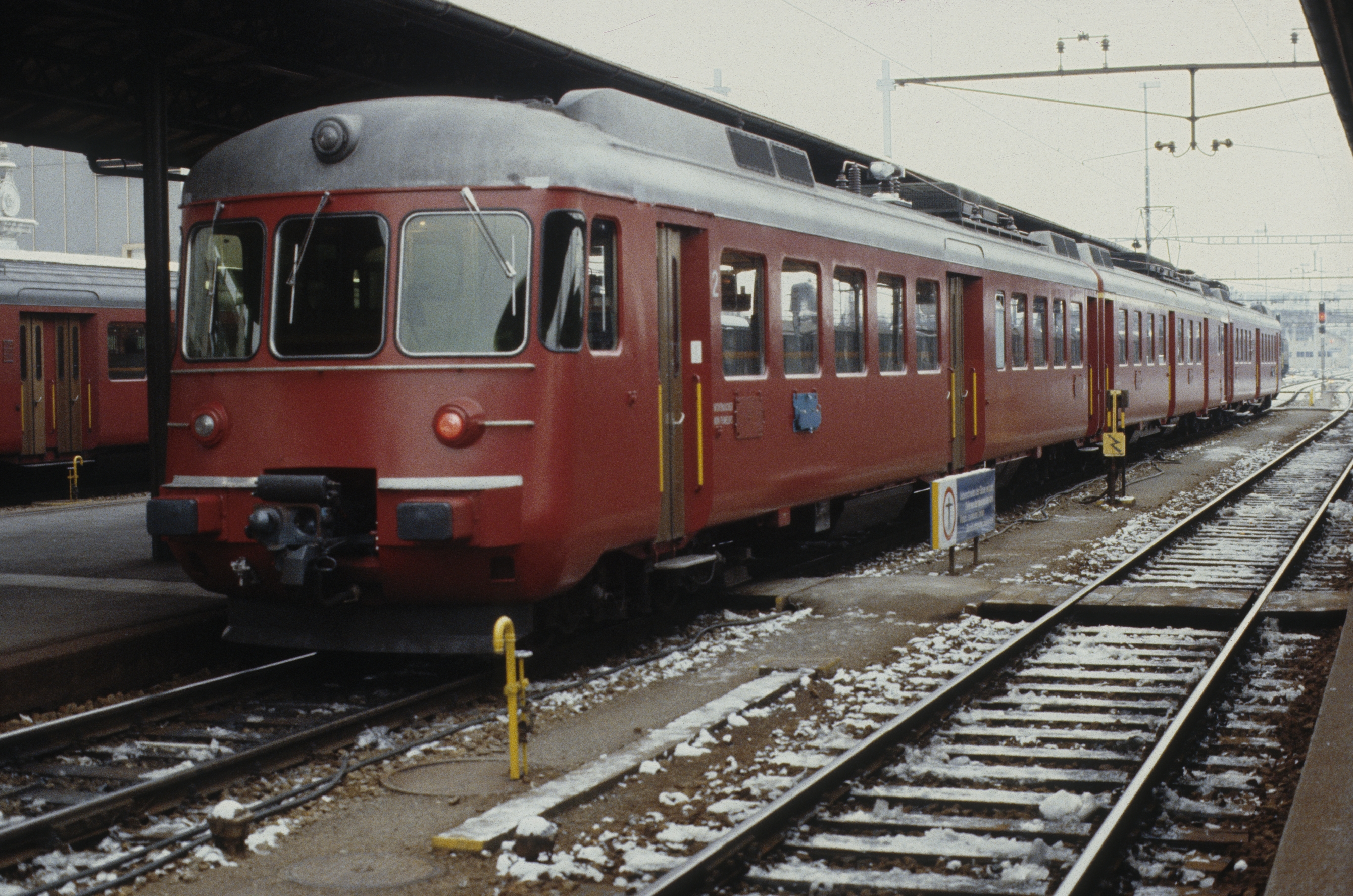
"Gold Coast Express" in 1983

The railway line along the right shore of Lake Zurich, from Zurich to Rapperswil, is known as the Lake Zurich right bank railway line. On 26 May 1968 service along this route started with unusual wine-red ‘Mirage’ EMU, which were nicknamed the "Gold Coast Express" (Goldküstenexpress). It took the old route of the line via the Letten Tunnel and Zurich Letten station. They were capable of operating at high speed. It was incorporated into the Zurich S-Bahn, which opened in 1990, and the line is since operated by the S7 service, which uses the whole line, and the S6, S16 and S20 services, which run only on part of the line.

== Cycle route ==
Cycle route 66 (Rapperswil–Baden) follows the Gold Coast (34 km (21 mi)) and continues northwards along the river Limmat.
