= Döttingen railway station =

Railway station in Döttingen, Switzerland

Döttingen
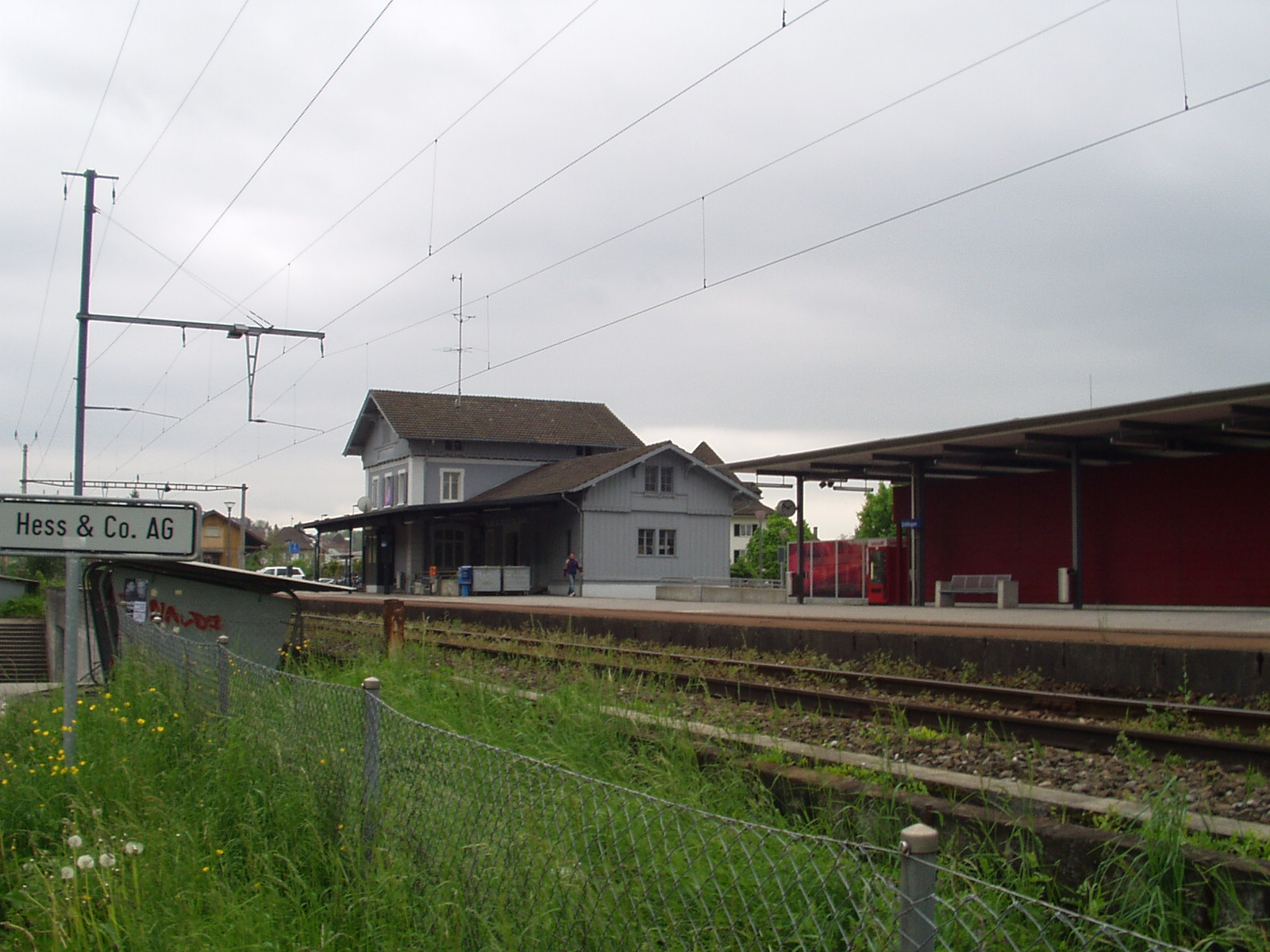
- The station building in 2015

General information
- Location: Döttingen; Switzerland
- Coordinates: 47°34′31″N 8°15′23″E
- Owner: Swiss Federal Railways
- Line: Turgi–Koblenz–Waldshut line
- Distance: 37.4 km (23.2 mi) from Zürich Hauptbahnhof
- Train operators: Swiss Federal Railways
- Connections: PostAuto Schweiz buses

History
- Former names: Döttingen-Klingnau (until 2002)

Passengers
- 2018: 2,700 per weekday

Services
Preceding station	Zurich S-Bahn	Following station
Klingnau towards Koblenz	S19	Siggenthal-Würenlingen towards Pfäffikon ZH
Preceding station	Aargau S-Bahn	Following station
Klingnau towards Waldshut or Bad Zurzach	S27	Siggenthal-Würenlingen towards Baden
Location
- Location within Switzerland Location within Canton of Aargau

Döttingen railway station (German: Bahnhof Döttingen) is a railway station in the municipality of Döttingen, in the Swiss canton of Aargau. It is an intermediate stop on the standard gauge Turgi–Koblenz–Waldshut line of Swiss Federal Railways.

== Services ==
The following services stop at Döttingen:

- Zürich S-Bahn S19: rush-hour service between Koblenz and Pfäffikon ZH.
- Aargau S-Bahn S27: half-hourly service between Baden and Koblenz; trains continue from Koblenz to Waldshut or Bad Zurzach.
