= Siggenthal-Würenlingen railway station =

Railway station in Untersiggenthal, Switzerland

Siggenthal-Würenlingen
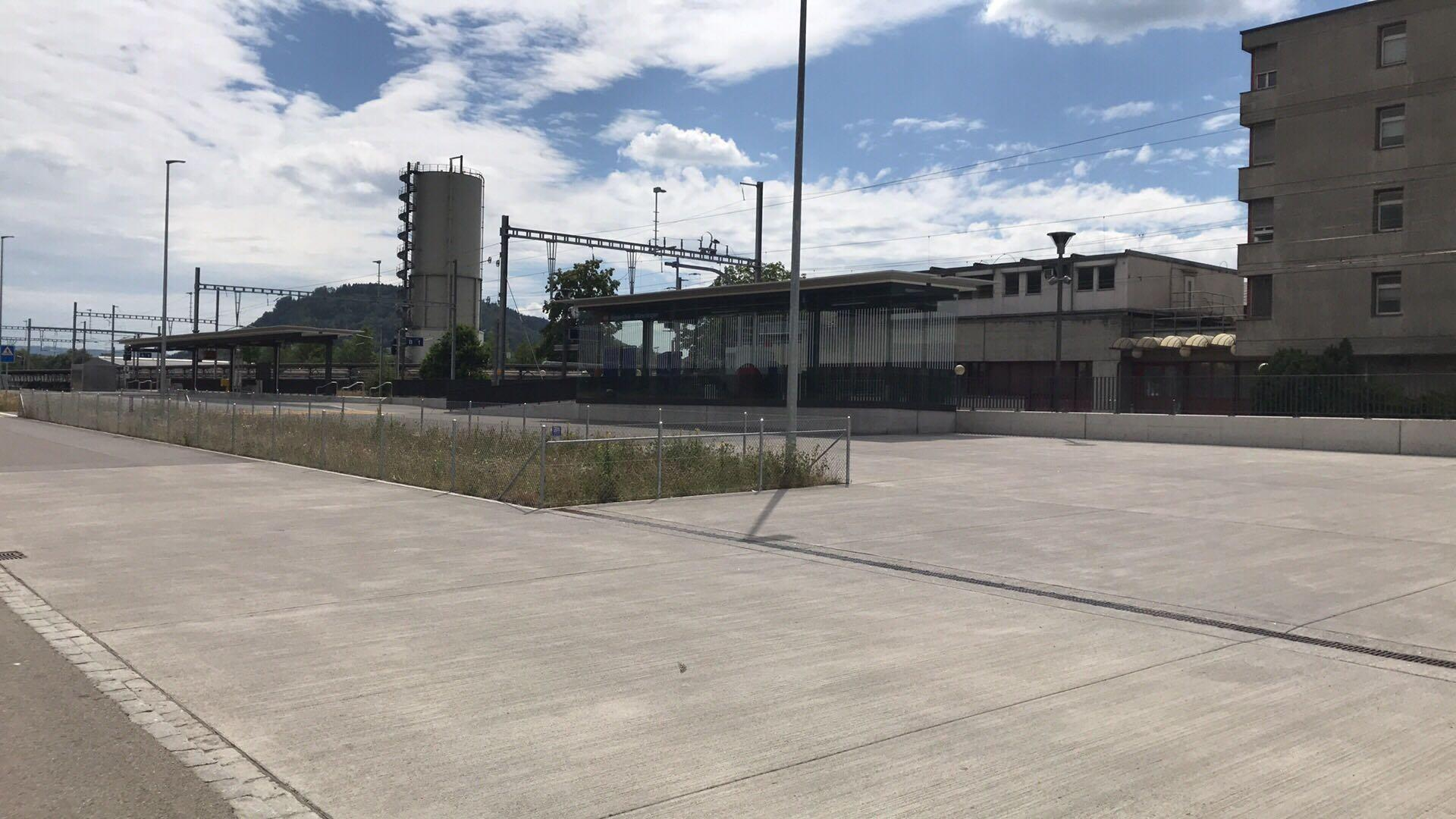
- The station platform in 2018

General information
- Location: Untersiggenthal; Switzerland
- Coordinates: 47°31′14″N 8°14′26″E
- Owner: Swiss Federal Railways
- Line: Turgi–Koblenz–Waldshut line
- Distance: 30.8 km (19.1 mi) from Zürich Hauptbahnhof
- Train operators: Swiss Federal Railways
- Connections: PostAuto Schweiz buses

History
- Former names: Siggenthal (until 1904)

Passengers
- 2018: 1,700 per weekday

Services
Preceding station	Zurich S-Bahn	Following station
Döttingen towards Koblenz	S19	Turgi towards Pfäffikon ZH
Preceding station	Aargau S-Bahn	Following station
Döttingen towards Waldshut or Bad Zurzach	S27	Turgi towards Baden
Location
- Location within Switzerland Location within Canton of Aargau

Siggenthal-Würenlingen railway station (German: Bahnhof Siggenthal-Würenlingen) is a railway station in the municipality of Untersiggenthal, in the Swiss canton of Aargau. It is an intermediate stop on the standard gauge Turgi–Koblenz–Waldshut line of Swiss Federal Railways.

== Services ==
The following services stop at Siggenthal-Würenlingen:

- Zürich S-Bahn S19: rush-hour service between Koblenz and Pfäffikon ZH.
- Aargau S-Bahn S27: half-hourly service between Baden and Koblenz; trains continue from Koblenz to Waldshut or Bad Zurzach.
