= Klingnau railway station =

Railway station in Switzerland

Klingnau
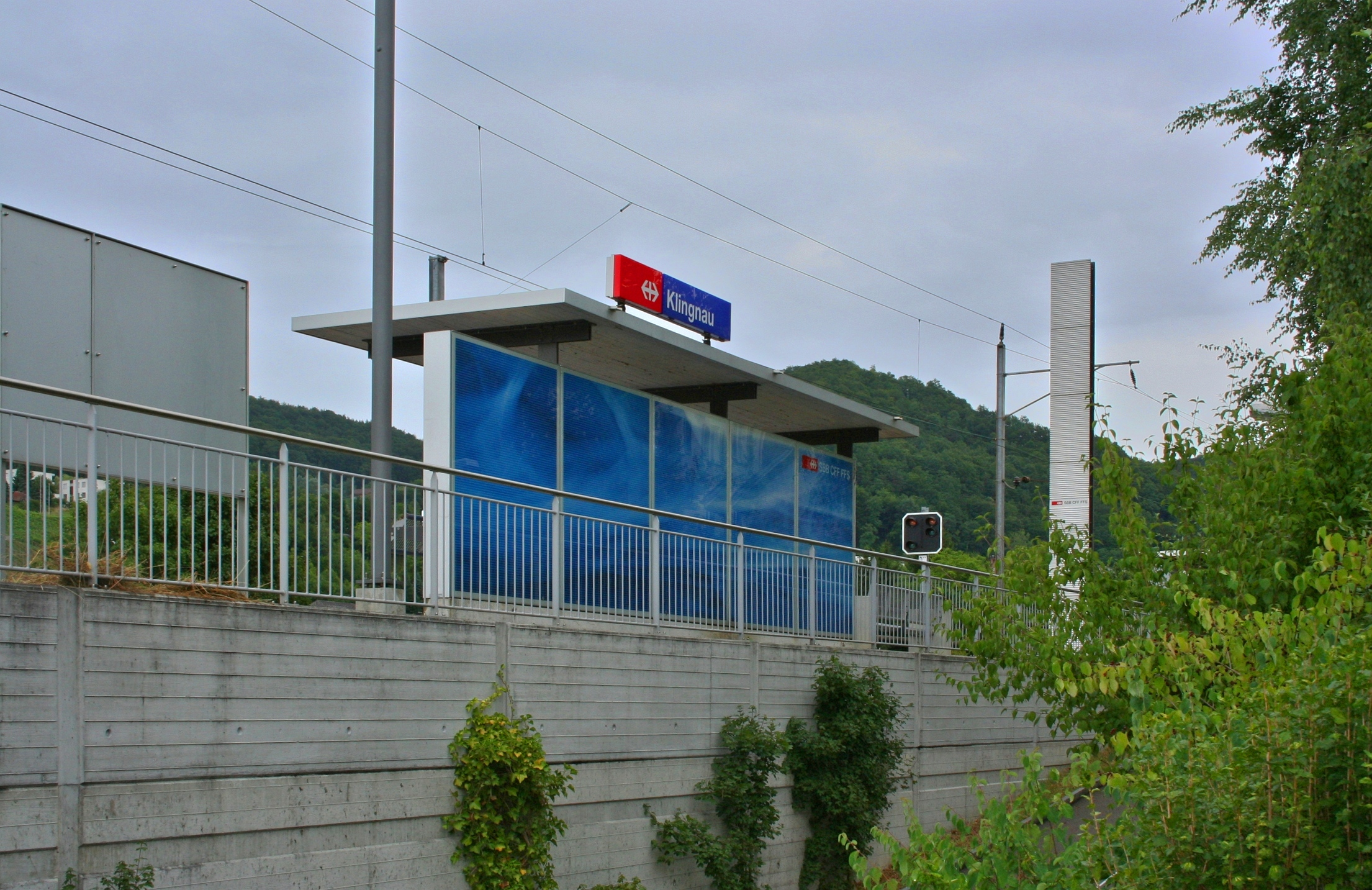
- The station platform in 2008

General information
- Location: Klingnau; Switzerland
- Coordinates: 47°34′56″N 8°14′56″E
- Owner: Swiss Federal Railways
- Line: Turgi–Koblenz–Waldshut line
- Distance: 38.3 km (23.8 mi) from Zürich Hauptbahnhof
- Train operators: Swiss Federal Railways

Passengers
- 2018: 740 per weekday

Services
Preceding station	Zurich S-Bahn	Following station
Koblenz Terminus	S19	Döttingen towards Pfäffikon ZH
Preceding station	Aargau S-Bahn	Following station
Koblenz towards Waldshut or Bad Zurzach	S27	Döttingen towards Baden
Location
- Location within Switzerland Location within Canton of Aargau

Klingnau railway station (German: Bahnhof Klingnau) is a railway station in the municipality of Klingnau, in the Swiss canton of Aargau. It is an intermediate stop on the standard gauge Turgi–Koblenz–Waldshut line of Swiss Federal Railways.

== Services ==
The following services stop at Klingnau:

- Zürich S-Bahn S19: rush-hour service between Koblenz and Pfäffikon ZH.
- Aargau S-Bahn S27: half-hourly service between Baden and Koblenz; trains continue from Koblenz to Waldshut or Bad Zurzach.
