= Turgi railway station =

Railway station in Switzerland

Turgi
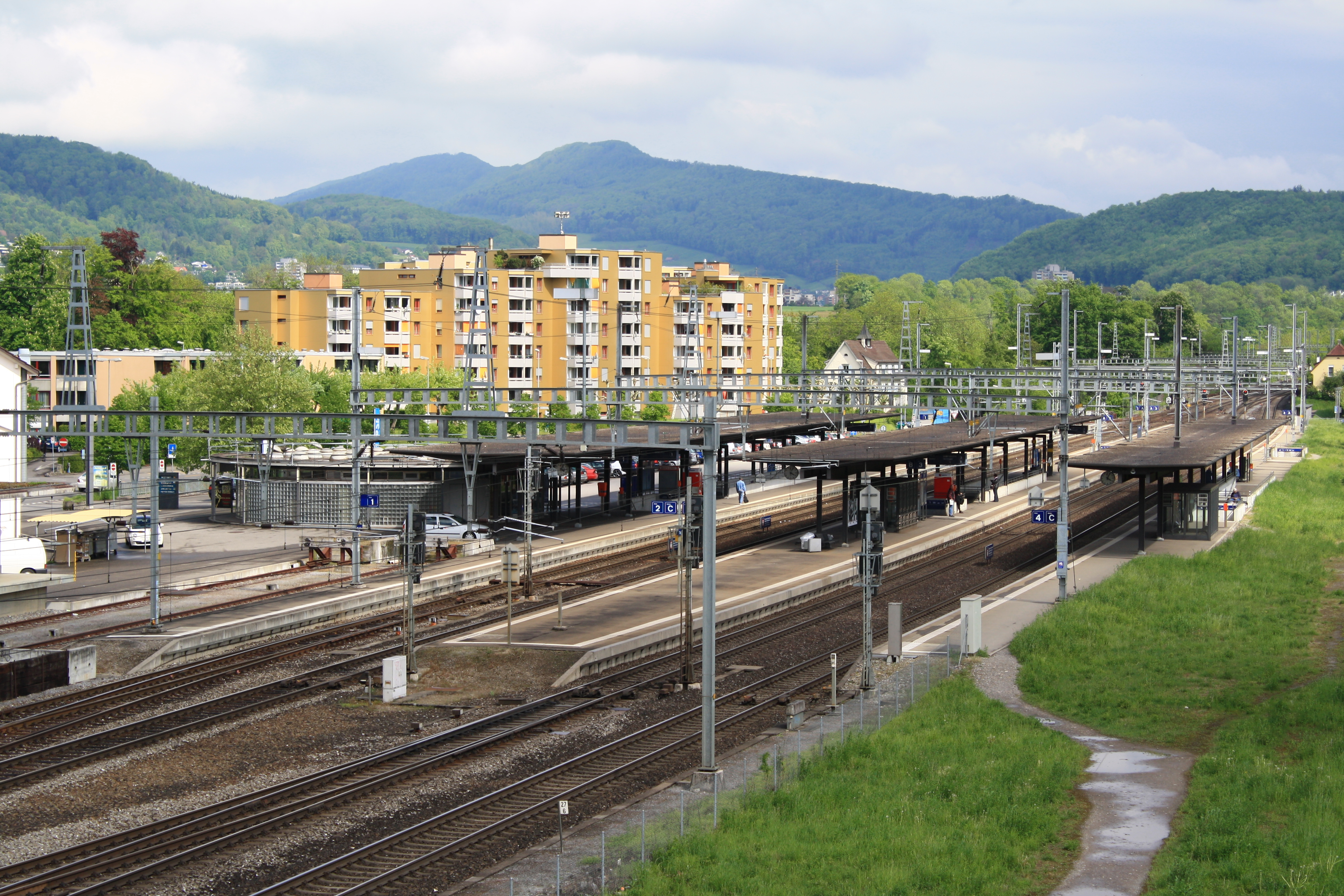
- The station platforms in 2010

General information
- Location: Turgi; Switzerland
- Coordinates: 47°29′30″N 8°15′12″E
- Elevation: 342 m (1,122 ft)
- Owner: Swiss Federal Railways (since 1902); Schweizerische Nordostbahn (1856-1902)
- Lines: Baden–Aarau line; Bözberg line; Turgi–Koblenz–Waldshut line
- Train operators: Swiss Federal Railways
- Connections: PostAuto Schweiz

Other information
- Fare zone: 560 (Tarifverbund A-Welle)

History
- Opened: 1856

Passengers
- 2018: 7,600 per weekday

Services
Preceding station	SBB CFF FFS	Following station
Brugg AG towards Olten	RE12	Baden towards Wettingen
Preceding station	Zurich S-Bahn	Following station
Brugg AG Terminus	S12	Baden towards Schaffhausen or Wil
Siggenthal-Würenlingen towards Koblenz	S19	Baden towards Pfäffikon ZH
Brugg AG towards Aarau	SN1 Limited service	Baden towards Winterthur
Preceding station	Aargau S-Bahn	Following station
Brugg AG towards Langenthal	S23	Baden Terminus
Siggenthal-Würenlingen towards Waldshut or Bad Zurzach	S27	Baden Terminus
Brugg AG towards Sursee	S29	Terminus
Location

Turgi railway station (German: Bahnhof Turgi) is a railway station in the municipality of Turgi in the Swiss canton of Aargau. The station is located on the Zurich to Olten main line, and is the junction for the Turgi–Koblenz–Waldshut line.

== Services ==
As of the December 2023 timetable change, the following services stop at Turgi:

- RegioExpress: hourly service between Olten and Wettingen.
- Zürich S-Bahn:
  - S12: half-hourly service between Brugg AG and Winterthur; trains continue from Winterthur to Schaffhausen or Wil.
  - S19: rush-hour service between Koblenz and Pfäffikon ZH.
  - SN1: on Friday and Saturday night, hourly service between Aarau and Winterthur via Zürich Stadelhofen.
- Aargau S-Bahn:
  - S23: hourly service between Langenthal and Baden.
  - S27: half-hourly service between Baden and Koblenz; trains continue from Koblenz to Waldshut or Bad Zurzach.
  - S29: half-hourly service to Aarau and hourly service to Sursee.
