= Dietlikon railway station =

Railway station in Switzerland

Dietlikon
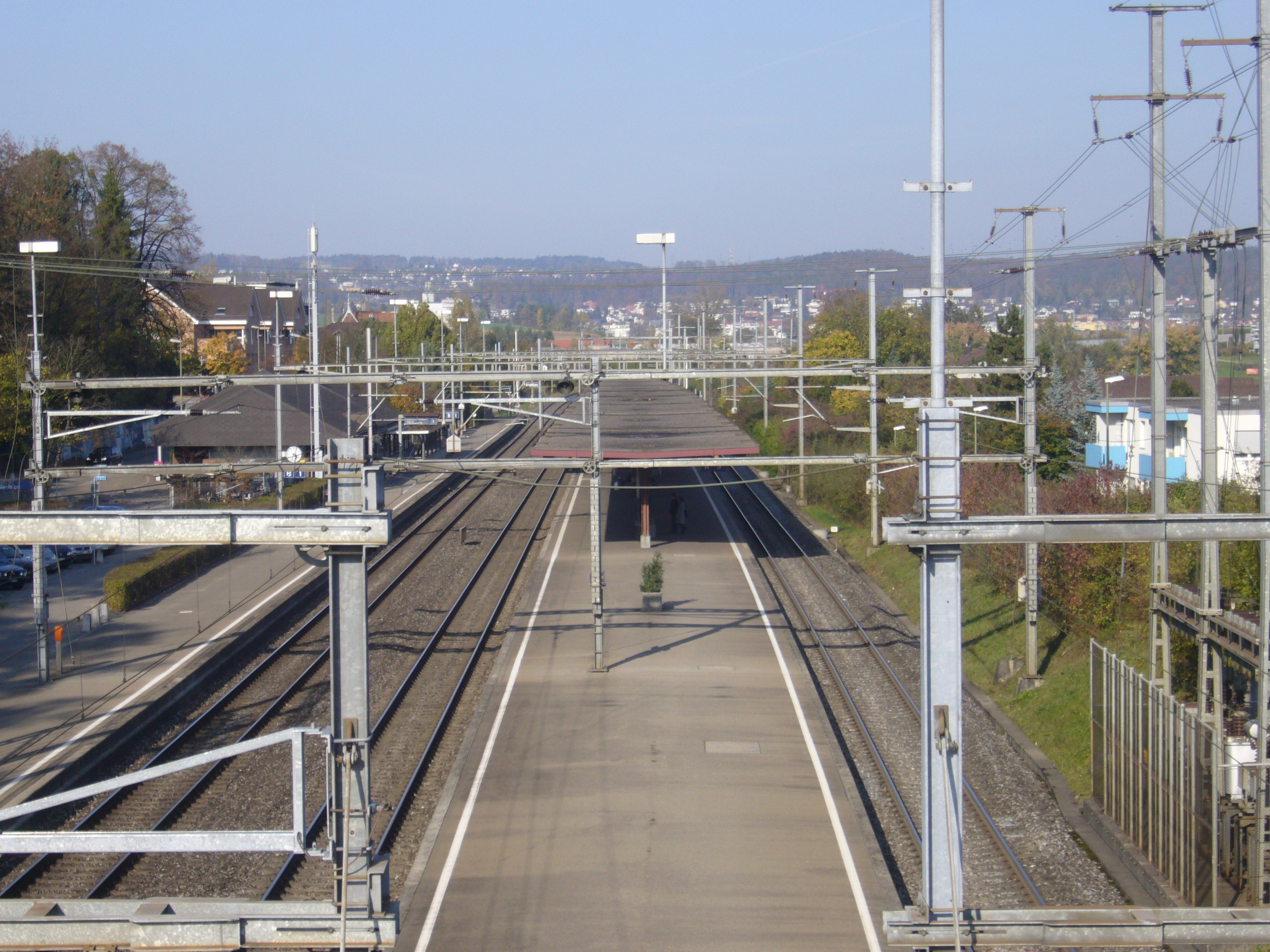
- Dietlikon station looking north

General information
- Location: Bahnhofstrasse; Dietlikon, Canton of Zurich; Switzerland
- Coordinates: 47°25′14″N 8°37′11″E
- Elevation: 445 m (1,460 ft)
- Owner: Swiss Federal Railways
- Line: Zurich–Winterthur line
- Platforms: 1 island platform; 1 side platform
- Train operators: Swiss Federal Railways
- Connections: Glattalbus (VBG)

Other information
- Fare zone: 121 (ZVV)

Passengers
- 2018: 9,600 per weekday

Services
Preceding station	Zurich S-Bahn	Following station
Stettbach towards Bülach	S3	Effretikon towards Wetzikon
Wallisellen towards Pfäffikon SZ	S8	Effretikon towards Winterthur
Wallisellen towards Koblenz	S19	Effretikon towards Pfäffikon ZH
Stettbach towards Aarau	SN1 Limited service	Effretikon towards Winterthur
Stettbach towards Würenlos	SN6 Limited service	Effretikon towards Winterthur
Wallisellen towards Lachen	SN8 Limited service	Effretikon towards Pfäffikon ZH
Stettbach towards Olten	SN11 Limited service	Effretikon One-way operation
Location

Dietlikon railway station (German: Bahnhof Dietlikon) is a railway station in the Swiss canton of Zürich and municipality of Dietlikon (Glatt Valley). The station is located on the Zürich to Winterthur railway line. It lies within fare zone 121 of the Zürcher Verkehrsverbund (ZVV).

The station has a side platform and a central platform, providing three platform faces and serving all three tracks passing through the station. To the south of the station, the three tracks diverge into two twin-track railway lines, one to Zürich via Wallisellen and the other to Zürich via Stettbach. To the north of the station the three tracks merge into the twin-track line to Effretikon.

Dietlikon station is not to be confused with Dietikon railway station located in Dietikon in the Limmat Valley (canton of Zurich).

== Service ==
Dietlikon station is served by Zurich S-Bahn lines S3, S8 and S19. A number of other S-Bahn lines pass through the station without stopping. On weekends, there are four nighttime S-Bahn services (SN1, SN6, SN8, SN11) offered by ZVV.

Summary of all S-Bahn services:

- Zurich S-Bahn:
  - S3: half-hourly service to Hardbrücke (or Bülach during peak hours) via Zürich Stadelhofen, and to Wetzikon.
  - S8: half-hourly service to Pfäffikon SZ via Zürich Oerlikon and Thalwil, and to Winterthur.
  - S19: half-hourly service to Dietikon (during peak hours to Koblenz) via Wallisellen and Zürich HB, and to Effretikon (during peak hours to Pfäffikon ZH).
  - Nighttime S-Bahn (only during weekends):
    - SN1: hourly service to Aarau via Zürich Stadelhofen, and to Winterthur.
    - SN6: hourly service to Würenlos via Zürich Stadelhofen, and to Winterthur.
    - SN8: hourly service to Lachen via Zürich Oerlikon, and to Pfäffikon ZH.
    - SN11: hourly service to Olten via Zürich HB.

== Future expansion and bus network reorganization ==
As part of the federal 3.3 billion franc "MehrSpur Zürich–Winterthur" capacity expansion project, Dietlikon station is undergoing an extensive infrastructural transformation to accommodate a fourth rail track and the connection to the upcoming Brüttenertunnel. Major preparatory utilities relocations and a long-term closure of the northern railway crossing commenced in early 2026. Due to the heavy structural work around the station area, the Verkehrsbetriebe Glattal (VBG) implemented permanent layout overhauls and route modifications to the local bus network starting on 13 April 2026.

The structural construction fundamentally altered the local bus hub, resulting in several key adjustments:

- Stop Renamings: To adapt to the new station layout, the classic "Pappelstrasse" stop was renamed "Bahnhof Ost", the main "Bahnhof" stop became "Bahnhof West", and "Bahnhof/Bad" was changed to "Schwimmbad".
- Lines 765 and 796: These lines were rerouted to run through the newly designated "Bahnhof Ost" stop, utilizing "Schwimmbad" as their terminal turning point.

Line 787: This line's routing was altered to run from Brüttisellen Zentrum via "Bahnhof Ost" directly to "Brandbachstrasse", completely removing its historical service to the "Schwimmbad" stop.

The core phase of the heavy station rebuild, which will introduce a fourth through-track, a brand-new station building, a bicycle station, and a fully barrier-free pedestrian overpass, is scheduled to begin main construction in 2027 and run through 2032.

== See also ==
- Rail transport in Switzerland
