= Fehraltorf railway station =

Railway station in Fehraltorf, Switzerland

Fehraltorf
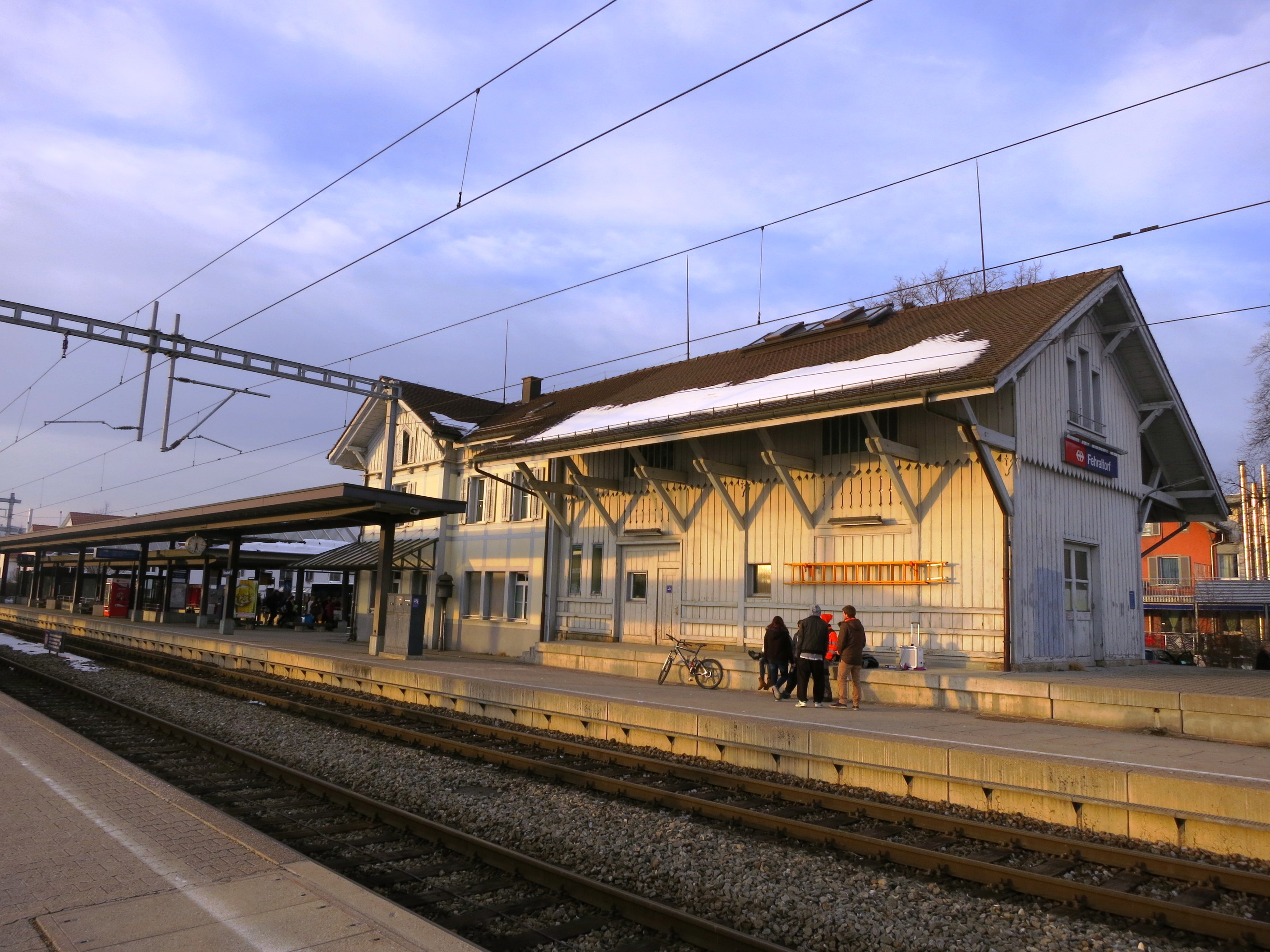

General information
- Location: Bahnhofstrasse, Fehraltorf, Canton of Zurich, Switzerland
- Coordinates: 47.38497°N 8.749806°E
- Elevation: 531 m (1,742 ft)
- Owner: Swiss Federal Railways
- Operator: Swiss Federal Railways
- Line: Effretikon–Hinwil line
- Platforms: 2 side platforms
- Tracks: 2
- Connections: ZVV
- Bus: PostAuto bus routes 827 831 832

Other information
- Fare zone: 135 (ZVV)

Passengers
- 2018: 3,700 per weekday

Services
Preceding station	Zurich S-Bahn	Following station
Illnau towards Bülach	S3	Pfäffikon ZH towards Wetzikon
Illnau towards Koblenz	S19	Pfäffikon ZH Terminus
Illnau towards Lachen	SN8 Limited service	Pfäffikon ZH Terminus
Location
- Location within Switzerland Location within Canton of Zurich

Fehraltorf is a railway station in the municipality of Fehraltorf in the canton of Zurich, Switzerland. The station is located on the Effretikon to Hinwil railway line, within fare zone 135 of the Zürcher Verkehrsverbund (ZVV).

== Service ==
The station is only served by S-Bahn trains. It is an intermediate stop on Zurich S-Bahn service S3, which links Zürich Hardbrücke and Wetzikon via Zürich Stadelhofen and Effretikon. During rush hour, the S3 continues from Hardbrücke to Bülach. Fehraltorf is also served by Zurich S-Bahn service S19 during peak periods, which operates between Koblenz and Pfäffikon. On weekends (Friday and Saturday nights), there is a nighttime S-Bahn service (SN8) offered by ZVV. Summary of all S-Bahn services:

- Zurich S-Bahn:
  - S3: half-hourly service to Zürich Hardbrücke (or Bülach during peak hour) via Zürich HB, and to Wetzikon.
  - S19: half-hourly service during peak hours to Koblenz via Zürich HB, and to Pfäffikon ZH.
  - Nighttime S-Bahn (only during weekends):
    - SN8: hourly service to Lachen via Zürich HB, and to Pfäffikon ZH.

The station is also served by severals bus routes of PostAuto, which depart adjacent to the station.

== See also ==
- Rail transport in Switzerland
