= Pfäffikon railway station =

Pfäffikon railway station may refer to:

- Pfäffikon SZ railway station - in the Swiss canton of Schwyz, albeit on the shores of Lake Zürich
- Pfäffikon ZH railway station - in the Swiss canton of Zürich
