= S19 (ZVV) =

Railway service in Switzerland

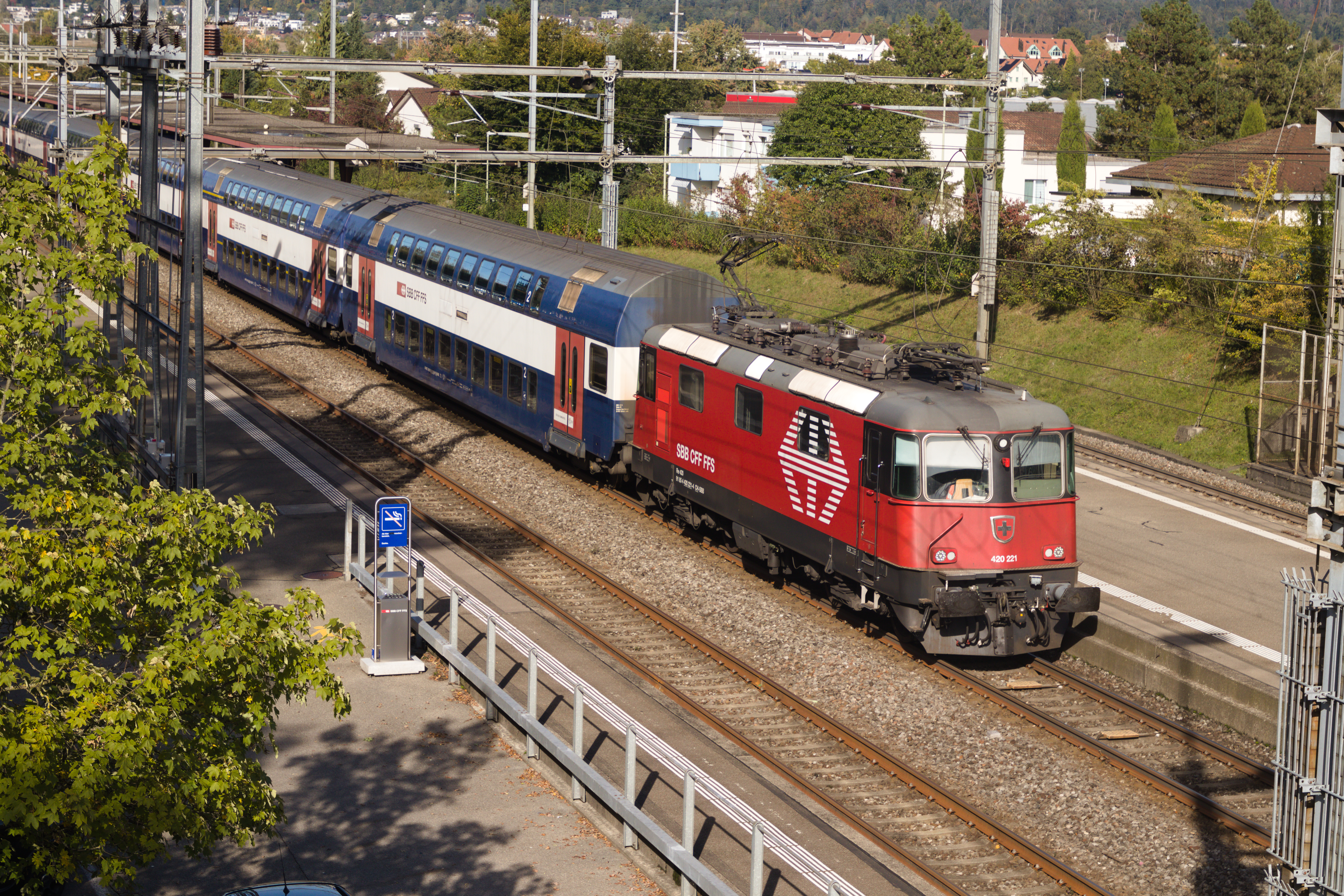
- Remodelled Re 420 (LION) locomotives push-pulling double-deck carriages as S19 service at Dietlikon

Overview
- Status: Operational
- Locale: Zürich, Switzerland
- Website: ZVV (in English)

Service
- Type: S-Bahn
- System: Zürich S-Bahn
- Operator(s): Zürcher Verkehrsverbund (ZVV)
- Rolling stock: Re 420 or Re 450 locomotives with double-decker coaches

Technical
- Track gauge: 1,435 mm (4 ft 8 1/2 in)

Zürich S-Bahn network as of December 2019

The S19 is a regional railway line of the S-Bahn Zürich on the Zürcher Verkehrsverbund (ZVV), Zürich transportation network.

At Zürich HB, trains of the S19 service usually depart from underground tracks (Gleis) 31–34 (Löwenstrasse station).

== Route ==
- S19 (Koblenz–Baden–) Dietikon–Zürich HB–Oerlikon–Effretikon (–Pfäffikon ZH )

The core of the route operates from Dietikon to Effretikon, operating via Zürich Hauptbahnhof and the Weinberg tunnel. At peak periods, trains are extended hourly from Dietikon to Koblenz, and half-hourly from Effretikon to Pfäffikon ZH. The following stations are served:

- Koblenz
- Klingnau
- Döttingen
- Siggenthal-Würenlingen
- Turgi
- Baden
- Wettingen
- Dietikon
- Zürich Altstetten
- Zürich Hauptbahnhof
- Zürich Oerlikon
- Wallisellen
- Dietlikon
- Effretikon
- Illnau
- Fehraltorf
- Pfäffikon ZH

== Scheduling ==
Between Dietikon and Effretikon, trains run every 30 minutes throughout the day. During the morning and evening peaks, a number of trains operate to and from Koblenz and Pfäffikon ZH. The journey time of the routes core between Dietikon and Effretikon is just over 30 minute. A through journey between Koblenz and Pfäffikon ZH takes around 80 minutes, although only a handful of trains per day permit such a journey.

== Rolling stock ==
As of the December 2022 timetable change, services are operated by Re 450 class or two (head and tail) modified Re 420 (LION) locomotives pushing or pulling double-deck passenger carriages.

== History ==
The route was introduced in the timetable revision of late 2015.

== See also ==
- Rail transport in Switzerland
- List of railway stations in Zurich
- Public transport in Zurich
- ZVV fare zones
- A-Welle tariff network (Aargau)
