= Klingnau =

- Municipality
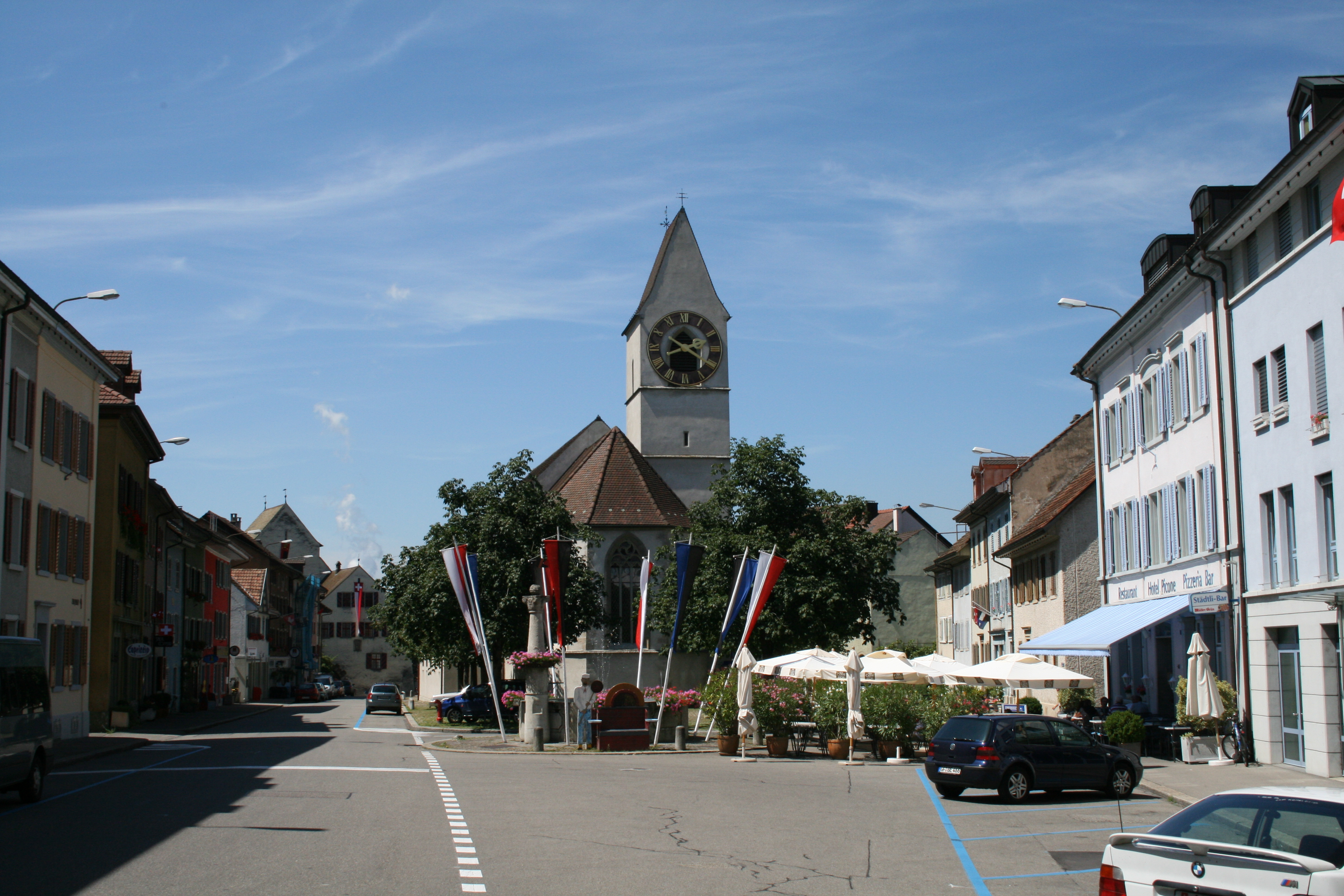

- Flag Coat of arms
- Location of Klingnau
- Location within Switzerland Location within Canton of Aargau
- Coordinates: 47°35′N 8°15′E
- Country: Switzerland
- Canton: Aargau
- District: Zurzach

Area
  - Total: 6.71 km^{2} (2.59 sq mi)
- Elevation: 328 m (1,076 ft)

Population (December 2005)
  - Total: 2,924
  - Density: 436/km^{2} (1,130/sq mi)
- Time zone: UTC+01:00 (CET)
  - Summer (DST): UTC+02:00 (CEST)
- Postal code: 5313
- SFOS number: 4309
- ISO 3166 code: CH-AG
- Surrounded by: Böttstein, Döttingen, Koblenz, Leuggern, Rietheim, Zurzach
- Website: www.klingnau.ch

Klingnau is a municipality in the district of Zurzach in the canton of Aargau in Switzerland.

== History ==
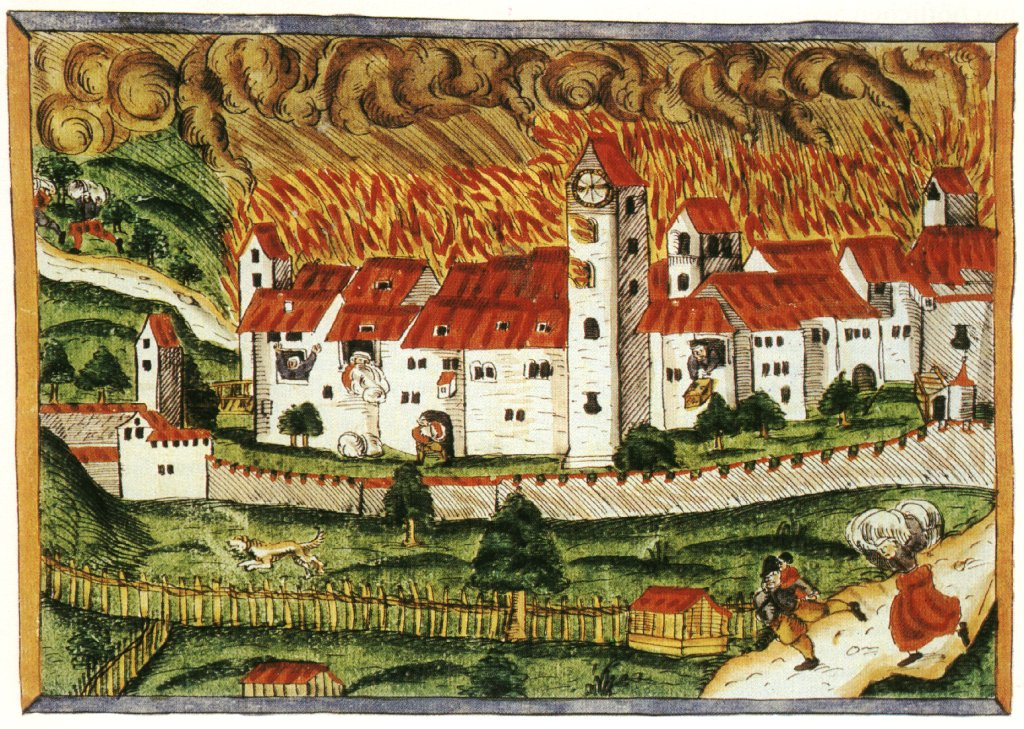
Great fire of 1586

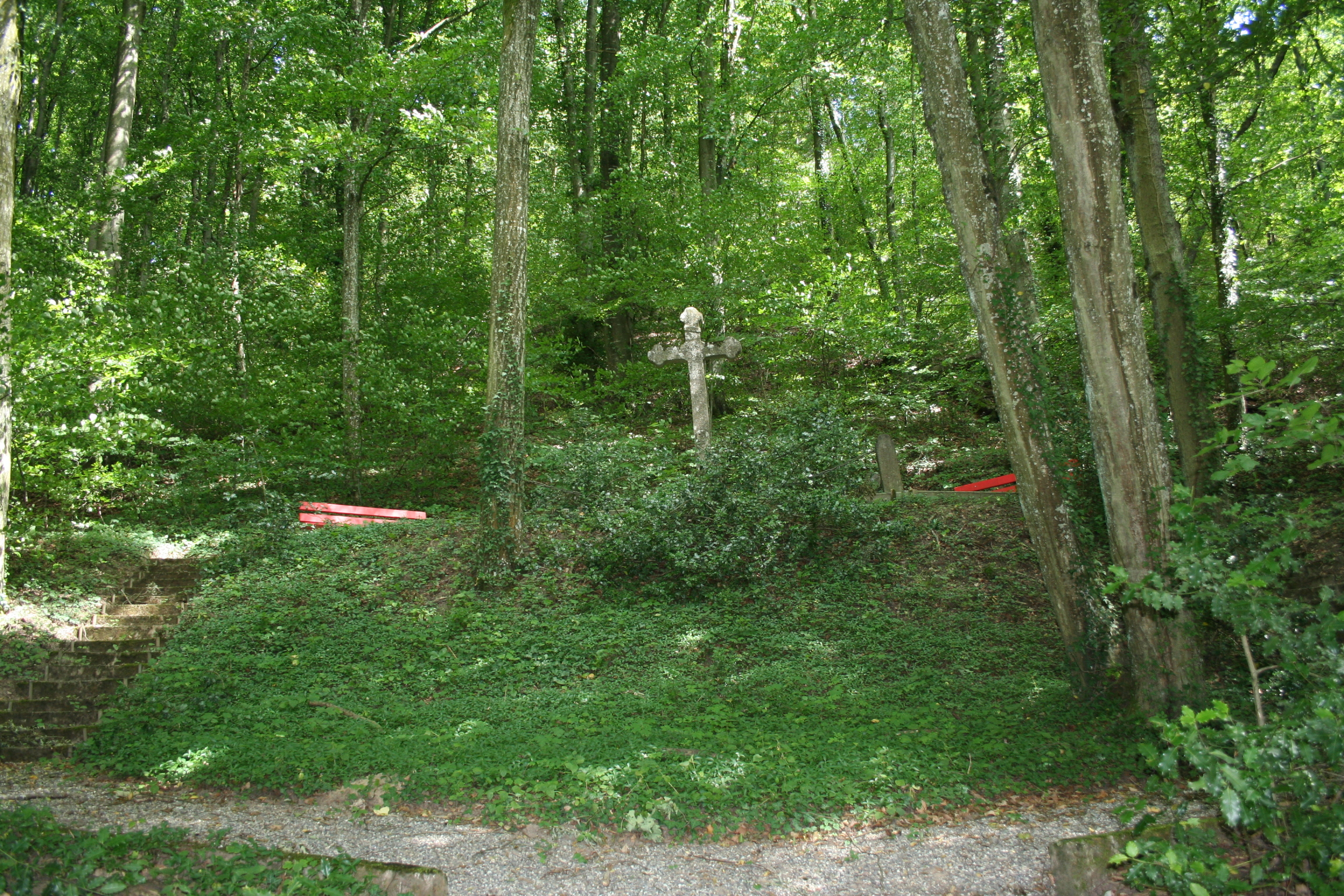
Mass grave following the typhoid epidemic of 1813–14

Klingnau is first mentioned in 1239 as Chlingenowe. Ulrich of Klingen acquired land from the monastery of St. Blaise in 1239 to found the city. He and the abbot reached an agreement over which of the abbey's own peasants could move to the new town. The von Klingen family granted extensive lands around the city to the Knights Hospitaller between 1251 and 1268. The knights owned so much property that in 1268 they moved their order house from Leuggern to Klingnau. They were given a separate gate in the city walls. Walther of Klingen sold the city and surroundings to his cousin the Bishop of Constance Eberhard von Waldburg in 1269. The new owner then appointed a bailiff in the town. Klingnau became the seat of an outer district that included Koblenz, Siglistorf, Mellstorf, Döttingen and Zurzach. In 1314, Klingnau was granted town privileges. Every year at midsummer the citizens were allowed to elect their lower and upper town council and a municipal court. In 1416, the Knights' order house moved back to Leuggern. Until 1800, an administrator managed the Knights' property. From 1415 until 1798, Klingnau was one of the three external districts of the county of Baden during the reign of the Swiss Confederation.

In the 17th century, some Jewish families occasionally lived in Klingnau, and operated the cattle trade for the town. The last bailiff, Joseph Haefelin, lost his post in 1798. As a replacement for the bailiffs, the citizens choose a five-member council. In March 1803, the council was removed by the municipality and replaced with a single Amtmann.

The growth of the municipal economy was repeatedly interrupted by disasters like the great fire of 1586 in which 84 houses were destroyed, or the plague of 1611 and 1635. The plague of 1611 killed 226 people, about one third of the population. The typhoid epidemic of 1813–14 killed about 3,000 people in and around the town, especially soldiers of the allies against Napoleon, who were passing through. They were buried in a mass grave at the Imperial Cemetery north of the town.

The course of the Aare was correct between 1885 and 1904 in order to combat the devastating floods. Between 1931 and 1935, the Klingnau power plant was built for Aarewerke AG, by damming the river. The lake (Klingnauer Stausee) has developed into a resting place for migratory birds and became a cantonal sanctuary in 1989.

At the time of city foundation, the area was part of the parish of Zurzach. In 1256 Walter of Klingen granted rights to tithes in the town to the kilchen ze Clingnow. In 1265 the collegiate church of Zurzach posted a permanent curate to Klingnau. In 1360 the parish of Klingnau included the city, the Chapel of Koblenz and the churches in Döttingen and Würenlingen. In this year the Bishop of Constance, Heinrich von Brandis, granted the parish church to the monastery Zurzach. In 1864 the selection of the parish priest went to the parish, and about two years later the rights and obligations of the congregation to the church at Zurzach were abolished. The Catholic parish church of St. Catherine was built in 1491 and was renovated in 1968–69. The Loreto Chapel on the Achenberg dates from 1660 to 1662 while the Reformed church was built in 1935.

The construction of the castle, originally the seat of the Klingen family, was started in 1240. Until 1269 a manor house stood on the grounds. After 1331 the outer walls were added. In the second half of the 14th century the Bishop of Constance was often a resident in the castle. He ordered further improvements and expansions. In the late 16th century, the castle, which was the seat of the Governor from Constance, in such bad condition that the Confederates demanded a renovation from the bishop. In 1804 the castle went to the newly formed Canton of Aargau, who auctioned it off in 1817. As a result, it has been used by various industries, until the 20th century when it was taken over by a foundation.

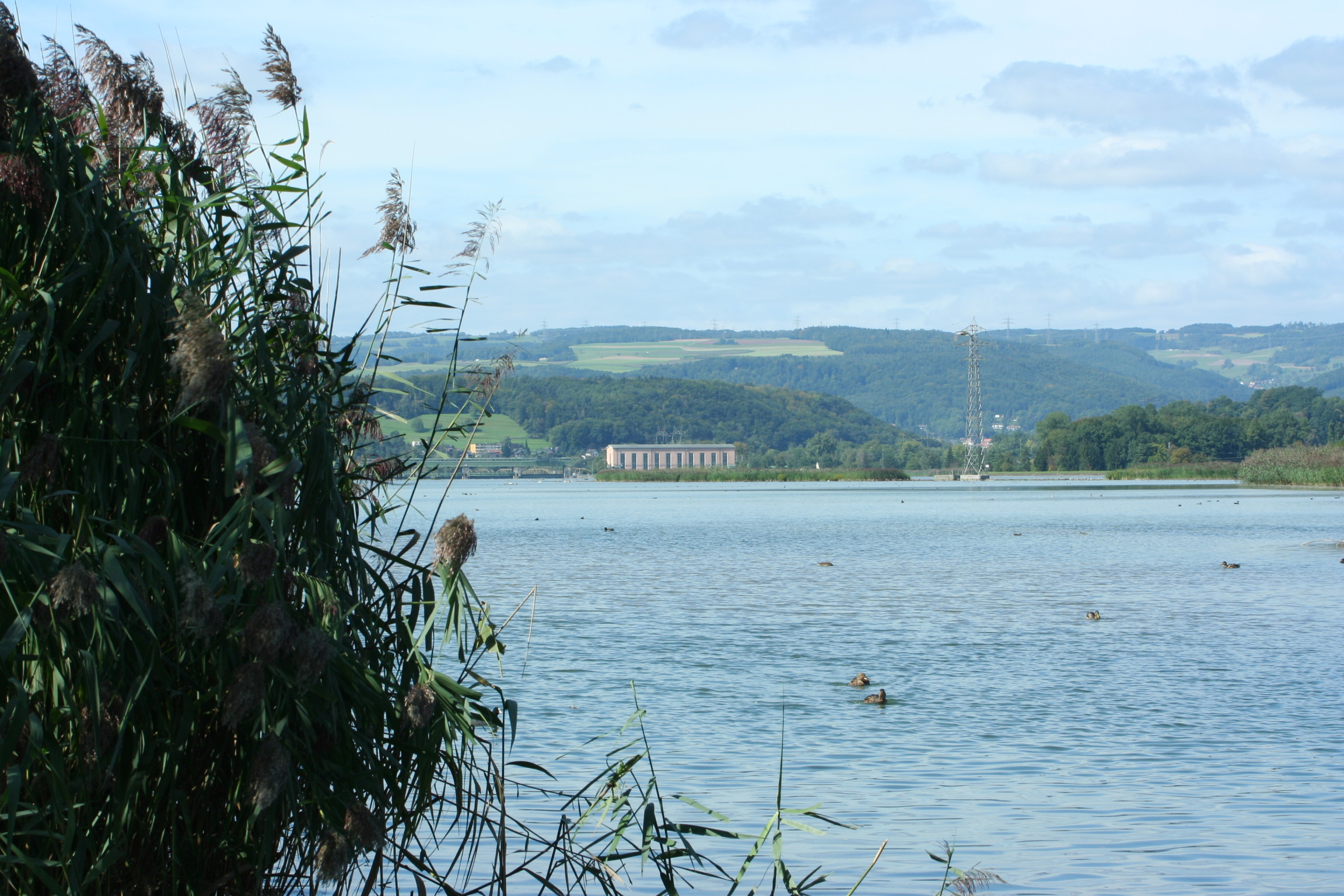
The hydroelectric plant and reservoir at Klingnau

In 1250 the provost of the monastery of St. Blaise moved his headquarters from Döttingen to Klingnau. The baroque buildings of the Provost's house, the third such structure in the same place, was built by Johann Caspar Bagnato in 1746–53. The building was sold in 1812. It now serves as a school.

East of the town, on the main road is the only monastery of the Hermits of Saint William in Switzerland. The monastery was founded in 1269 and was incorporated in 1725 into the monastery of St. Blaise.

The major sources of income for the inhabitants of the city were agriculture, handicrafts and viticulture. Already in the 13th and 14th centuries the Klingnauer wine was sold in large quantities. In 1780 there were about 115 hectares (280 acres) of vineyards recorded about 115 hectares of vineyards. The spread of phylloxera after 1900 led to a sharp decline, from which the wine industry did not recover until after 1930. The first industrial enterprises (raw silk production, weaving, straw plaiting and veneer factories) emerged around 1840. The construction of the railway line Turgi-Koblenz in 1859 gave the regional economic development further boosts and attracted a shoe factory (Bally Shoes), a cigar box factory and a baby carriage factory. From the turn of the century until the 1980s, most of the companies in the Swiss wood and furniture industry were in and around Klingnau. In 1975 there were 496 employees in 14 factories of the Swiss wood and furniture industry. By 1985 the number of employees had risen to 648 but there were only eight factories. While the largest companies remained, between 1960 and 1989, at least 20 medium and small companies went under. During that same time, many of the old wood and metal-working companies were replaced with high-tech and engineering companies. In 2000, the industrial sector still accounts for almost half of the jobs in the community.

== Geography ==
Aerial view (1946)

Klingnau has an area, as of 2009, of 6.71 square kilometers (2.59 sq mi). Of this area, 2.55 km^{2} (0.98 sq mi) or 38.0% is used for agricultural purposes, while 2.33 km^{2} (0.90 sq mi) or 34.7% is forested. Of the rest of the land, 1.29 km^{2} (0.50 sq mi) or 19.2% is settled (buildings or roads), 0.5 km^{2} (0.19 sq mi) or 7.5% is either rivers or lakes and 0.05 km^{2} (12 acres) or 0.7% is unproductive land.

Of the built up area, industrial buildings made up 2.5% of the total area while housing and buildings made up 9.2% and transportation infrastructure made up 4.8%. while parks, green belts and sports fields made up 1.9%. Out of the forested land, 32.9% of the total land area is heavily forested and 1.8% is covered with orchards or small clusters of trees. Of the agricultural land, 23.8% is used for growing crops and 11.2% is pastures, while 3.0% is used for orchards or vine crops. Of the water in the municipality, 5.7% is in lakes and 1.8% is in rivers and streams.

The municipality is located in the Zurzach district, on the right side of the lower Aare valley between the Klingnauer Stausee lake and theAchenberg. The village is located in a rocky outcropping, that used to be an island in the Aare river. The side channel of the river has since then silted up and the town is no longer an island. The island's shape influenced the shape of the old village. It consists of two rows of houses surrounding a lens-shaped church plaza.

== Coat of arms ==
The blazon of the municipal coat of arms is Gules a Mitre Sable lined Or between two Mullets of the last.

== Demographics ==
Klingnau has a population (as of December 2020) of 3,540. As of June 2009, 25.9% of the population are foreign nationals. Over the last 10 years (1997–2007) the population has changed at a rate of 7.9%. Most of the population (as of 2000) speaks German (89.2%), with Italian being second most common ( 3.6%) and Albanian being third ( 2.6%).

The age distribution, as of 2008, in Klingnau is; 245 children or 7.9% of the population are between 0 and 9 years old and 354 teenagers or 11.5% are between 10 and 19. Of the adult population, 463 people or 15.0% of the population are between 20 and 29 years old. 360 people or 11.7% are between 30 and 39, 479 people or 15.5% are between 40 and 49, and 446 people or 14.4% are between 50 and 59. The senior population distribution is 375 people or 12.1% of the population are between 60 and 69 years old, 238 people or 7.7% are between 70 and 79, there are 112 people or 3.6% who are between 80 and 89, and there are 15 people or 0.5% who are 90 and older.

As of 2000 the average number of residents per living room was 0.54 which is about equal to the cantonal average of 0.57 per room. In this case, a room is defined as space of a housing unit of at least 4 m^{2} (43 sq ft) as normal bedrooms, dining rooms, living rooms, kitchens and habitable cellars and attics. About 60.6% of the total households were owner occupied, or in other words did not pay rent (though they may have a mortgage or a rent-to-own agreement).

As of 2000, there were 91 homes with 1 or 2 persons in the household, 534 homes with 3 or 4 persons in the household, and 468 homes with 5 or more persons in the household. As of 2000, there were 1,125 private households (homes and apartments) in the municipality, and an average of 2.4 persons per household. In 2008 there were 617 single family homes (or 45.3% of the total) out of a total of 1,362 homes and apartments. There were a total of 17 empty apartments for a 1.2% vacancy rate. As of 2007, the construction rate of new housing units was 7.4 new units per 1000 residents.

In the 2007 federal election the most popular party was the SVP which received 35.04% of the vote. The next three most popular parties were the CVP (22.73%), the FDP (14.57%) and the SP (14.13%). In the federal election, a total of 921 votes were cast, and the voter turnout was 48.1%.

Population

The historical population is given in the following table:

Historical population
Year	Pop.	±%
1800	1,000	—
1850	1,300	+30.0%
1900	1,134	−12.8%
1950	1,778	+56.8%
2000	2,710	+52.4%

== Heritage sites of national significance ==
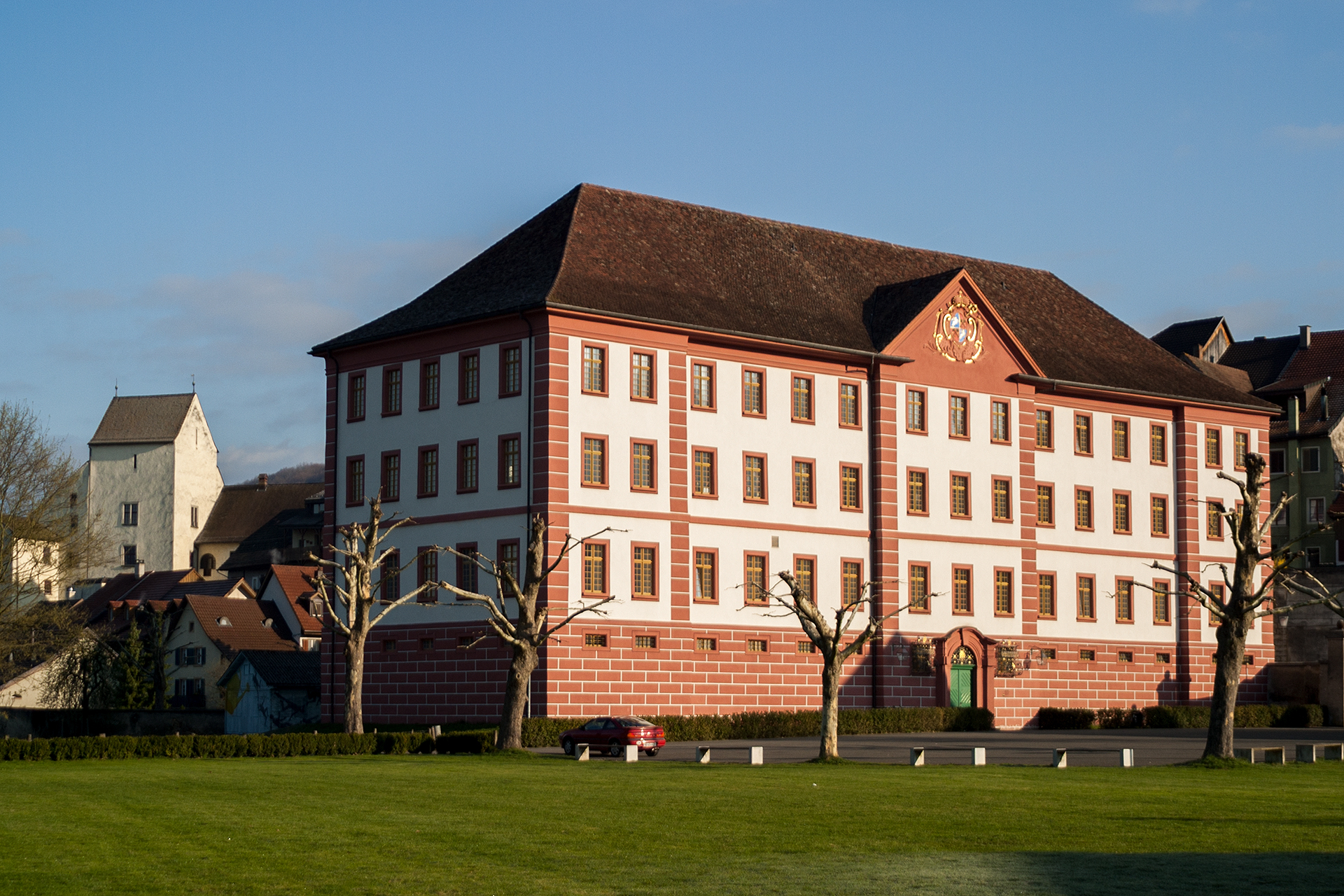
Provost's house

The former Provost's house of the St. Blasien Abbey at Propsteistrasse 1 is listed as a Swiss heritage site of national significance. The entire village of Klingnau is designated as part of the Inventory of Swiss Heritage Sites.

== Economy ==
As of 2007, Klingnau had an unemployment rate of 2.15%. As of 2005, there were 50 people employed in the primary economic sector and about 15 businesses involved in this sector. 406 people are employed in the secondary sector and there are 38 businesses in this sector. 420 people are employed in the tertiary sector, with 78 businesses in this sector.

In 2000 there were 1,356 workers who lived in the municipality. Of these, 1,090 or about 80.4% of the residents worked outside Klingnau while 438 people commuted into the municipality for work. There were a total of 704 jobs (of at least 6 hours per week) in the municipality. Of the working population, 15% used public transportation to get to work, and 54.3% used a private car.

== Religion ==
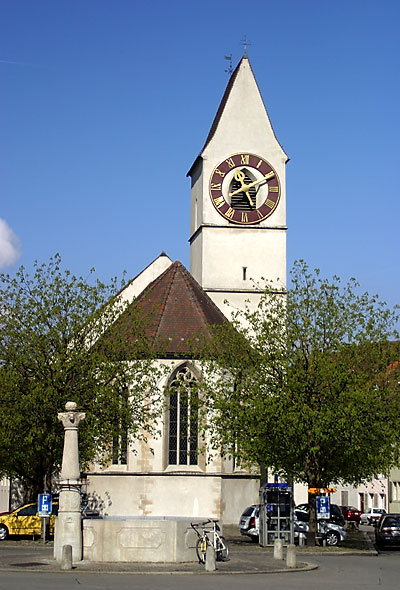
Church in Klingnau

From the 2000 census, 1,552 or 57.3% were Roman Catholic, while 636 or 23.5% belonged to the Swiss Reformed Church. Of the rest of the population, there were 5 individuals (or about 0.18% of the population) who belonged to the Christian Catholic faith.

== Education ==
In Klingnau about 74.2% of the population (between age 25–64) have completed either non-mandatory upper secondary education or additional higher education (either university or a Fachhochschule). Of the school age population (in the 2008/2009 school year), there are 168 students attending primary school, there are 105 students attending secondary school, there are 132 students attending tertiary or university level schooling in the municipality.

Klingnau is home to the Regionalbibliothek Klingnau (Regional Library). The library has (as of 2008) 12,422 books or other media, and loaned out 48,062 items in the same year. It was open a total of 300 days with average of 15 hours per week during that year.

== Notable people ==
- Sebastian Peregrin Zwyer (1597 – 1661) a Swiss military commander, mercenary entrepreneur, a politician of the Old Swiss Confederacy, probably born in Klingnau
- Hans Schleuniger (born 1933 in Klingnau) a Swiss former professional racing cyclist, he rode in the 1960 Tour de France
