= Döttingen, Aargau =

Döttingen
- Municipality
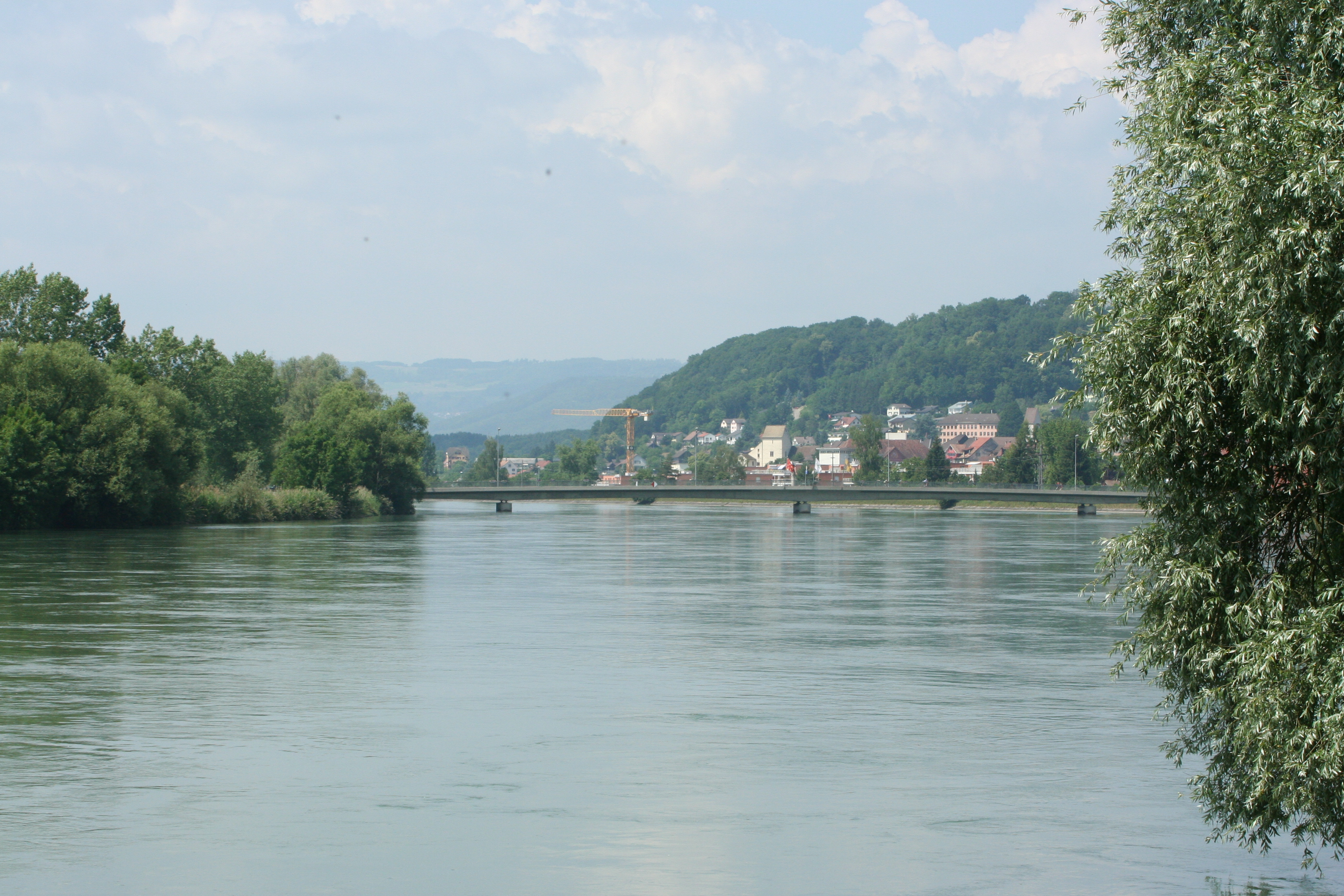

- Flag Coat of arms
- Location of Döttingen
- Location within Switzerland Location within Canton of Aargau
- Coordinates: 47°34′N 8°16′E
- Country: Switzerland
- Canton: Aargau
- District: Zurzach

Area
  - Total: 6.92 km^{2} (2.67 sq mi)
- Elevation: 328 m (1,076 ft)

Population (December 2006)
  - Total: 3,423
  - Density: 495/km^{2} (1,280/sq mi)
- Time zone: UTC+01:00 (CET)
  - Summer (DST): UTC+02:00 (CEST)
- Postal code: 5312
- SFOS number: 4304
- ISO 3166 code: CH-AG
- Surrounded by: Böttstein, Klingnau, Tegerfelden, Würenlingen, Zurzach
- Website: www.doettingen.ch

Döttingen (German: [ˈdœtɪŋən]) is a municipality in the district of Zurzach in the canton of Aargau in Switzerland.

Aerial view (1956)

== History ==
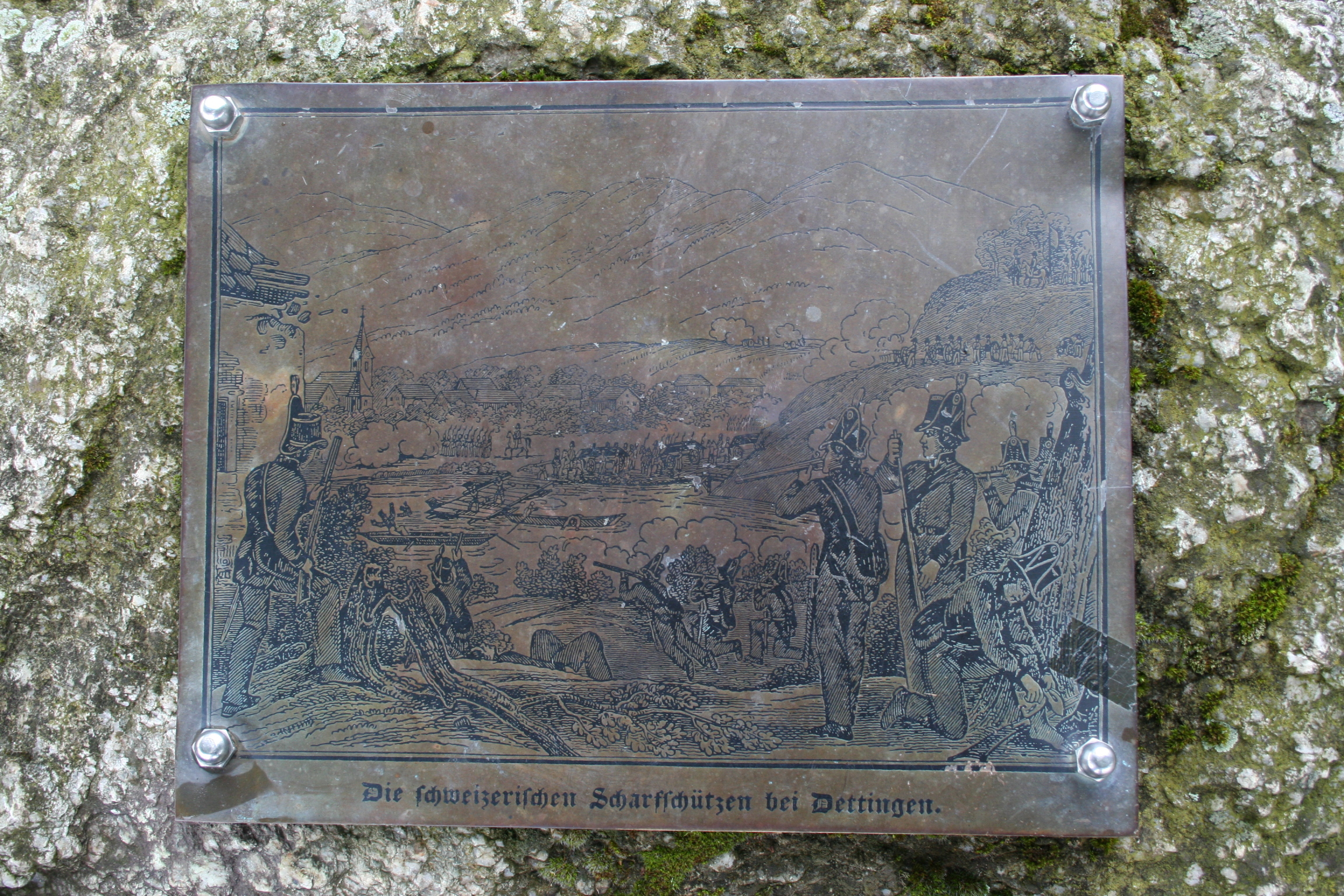
Memorial to the 1799 battle between France and Austria

Some items from the Neolithic period and two Roman-era estates have been discovered in Döttingen. The modern municipality of Döttingen is first mentioned in 1239 as Totingen. Until the 19th Century it was also known as Grossdöttingen.

The monastery of Sankt Blasien Abbey in the Black Forest had large estates in Döttingen and possessed a manor house in the village. It was part of the low court of the Klingnau district of the Bishopric of Constance after 1269.

In March 1798, the French Army marched into Switzerland, and proclaimed the Helvetic Republic. Döttingen was a short-lived municipality in the Canton of Baden. During the War of the Second Coalition, the front line between the French and Austrians ran through the middle of the Aare. On 17 August 1799 the Austrian troops tried to cross the Aare at Döttingen. From the mouth of the Surb river, they bombarded the French army on the other side of the river with artillery. The French returned the fire and were able to prevent Austrian crossing. The villages of Kleindöttingen and Eien, on the other side of the river, were completely destroyed and there were several dozen deaths. The biannual Übereschüsset festival commemorates the event.

Until the formation of a separate parish in 1848 it was part of the Klingnau parish. In 1961 the Catholic Church of St. John was built by Hermann Baur.

The local economy was dominated by agriculture and viticulture, until the railway arrived in 1859 (see Döttingen railway station). It developed into a regional industrial center, mostly processing wood. In 1902, in the former hamlet of Beznau a hydroelectric plant was built. In 1948 an oil-fired power plant was built in the municipality. Then, in 1969 and 1971 two blocks of the nuclear power plant NOK were built. In 2000 more than half of the workforce worked in manufacturing.

Since 1950, the largest Wine Festival in German-speaking Switzerland has taken place annually in Döttingen.

== Geography ==
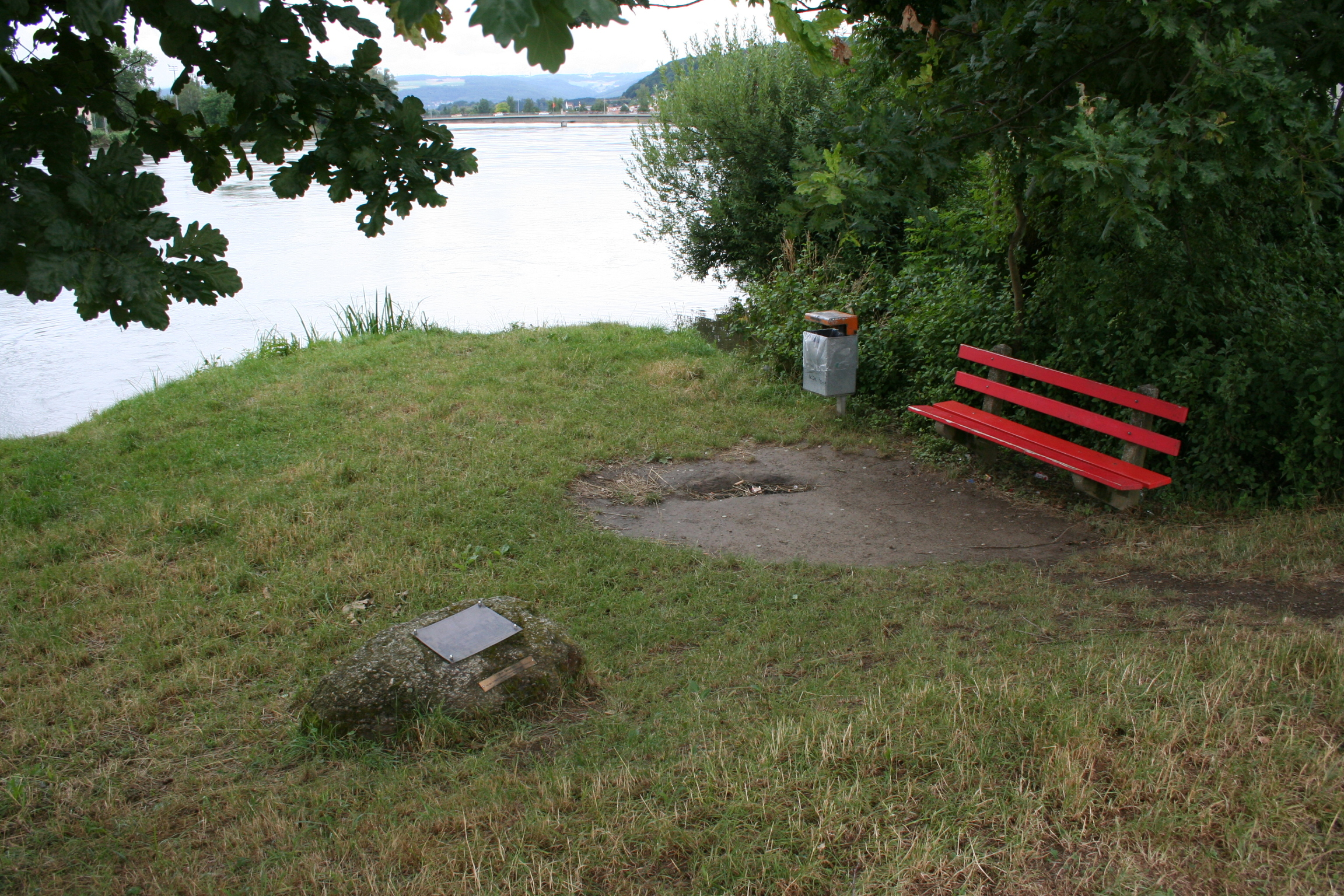
Park on the Aare river with memorial to the 1799 battle between Austria and France

Döttingen has an area, as of 2009, of 6.92 square kilometers (2.67 sq mi). Of this area, 2.25 km^{2} (0.87 sq mi) or 32.5% is used for agricultural purposes, while 2.41 km^{2} (0.93 sq mi) or 34.8% is forested. Of the rest of the land, 1.81 km^{2} (0.70 sq mi) or 26.2% is settled (buildings or roads), 0.47 km^{2} (0.18 sq mi) or 6.8% is either rivers or lakes and 0.01 km^{2} (2.5 acres) or 0.1% is unproductive land.

Of the built up area, industrial buildings made up 3.9% of the total area while housing and buildings made up 10.1% and transportation infrastructure made up 6.6%. Power and water infrastructure as well as other special developed areas made up 4.6% of the area Out of the forested land, 33.5% of the total land area is heavily forested and 1.3% is covered with orchards or small clusters of trees. Of the agricultural land, 21.8% is used for growing crops and 6.9% is pastures, while 3.8% is used for orchards or vine crops. All the water in the municipality is flowing water.

The municipality is located in the Zurzach district, at the confluence of the Surb river into the Aare river. Together with Klingnau it forms a regional center in the lower Aare valley. It consists of the haufendorf village (an irregular, unplanned and quite closely packed village, built around a central square) of Döttingen and the hamlets of Kleindöttingen.

== Coat of arms ==
The blazon of the municipal coat of arms is Per fess Or and Sable a Pale counterchanged.

== Demographics ==
Döttingen has a population (as of December 2020) of 4,244. As of June 2009, 39.1% of the population are foreign nationals. Over the last 10 years (1997–2007) the population has changed at a rate of 5.4%. Most of the population (as of 2000) speaks German (76.2%), with Italian being second most common ( 7.8%) and Albanian being third ( 4.4%).

The age distribution, as of 2008, in Döttingen is; 373 children or 10.3% of the population are between 0 and 9 years old and 452 teenagers or 12.5% are between 10 and 19. Of the adult population, 478 people or 13.2% of the population are between 20 and 29 years old. 504 people or 13.9% are between 30 and 39, 591 people or 16.3% are between 40 and 49, and 480 people or 13.2% are between 50 and 59. The senior population distribution is 378 people or 10.4% of the population are between 60 and 69 years old, 238 people or 6.6% are between 70 and 79, there are 113 people or 3.1% who are between 80 and 89, and there are 22 people or 0.6% who are 90 and older.

As of 2000 the average number of residents per living room was 0.59 which is about equal to the cantonal average of 0.57 per room. In this case, a room is defined as space of a housing unit of at least 4 m^{2} (43 sq ft) as normal bedrooms, dining rooms, living rooms, kitchens and habitable cellars and attics. About 48.2% of the total households were owner occupied, or in other words did not pay rent (though they may have a mortgage or a rent-to-own agreement).

As of 2000, there were 81 homes with 1 or 2 persons in the household, 689 homes with 3 or 4 persons in the household, and 450 homes with 5 or more persons in the household. As of 2000, there were 1,266 private households (homes and apartments) in the municipality, and an average of 2.5 persons per household. In 2008 there were 515 single family homes (or 36.0% of the total) out of a total of 1,429 homes and apartments. There were a total of 12 empty apartments for a 0.8% vacancy rate. As of 2007, the construction rate of new housing units was 0.9 new units per 1000 residents.

In the 2007 federal election the most popular party was the SVP which received 38.97% of the vote. The next three most popular parties were the CVP (24.61%), the FDP (14.59%) and the SP (10.73%). In the federal election, a total of 882 votes were cast, and the voter turnout was 48.0%.

Population

The historical population is given in the following table:

Historical population
Year	Pop.	±%
1799	825	—
1850	1,098	+33.1%
1900	974	−11.3%
1950	1,738	+78.4%
1970	3,380	+94.5%
1990	3,298	−2.4%
2000	3,241	−1.7%

== Economy ==
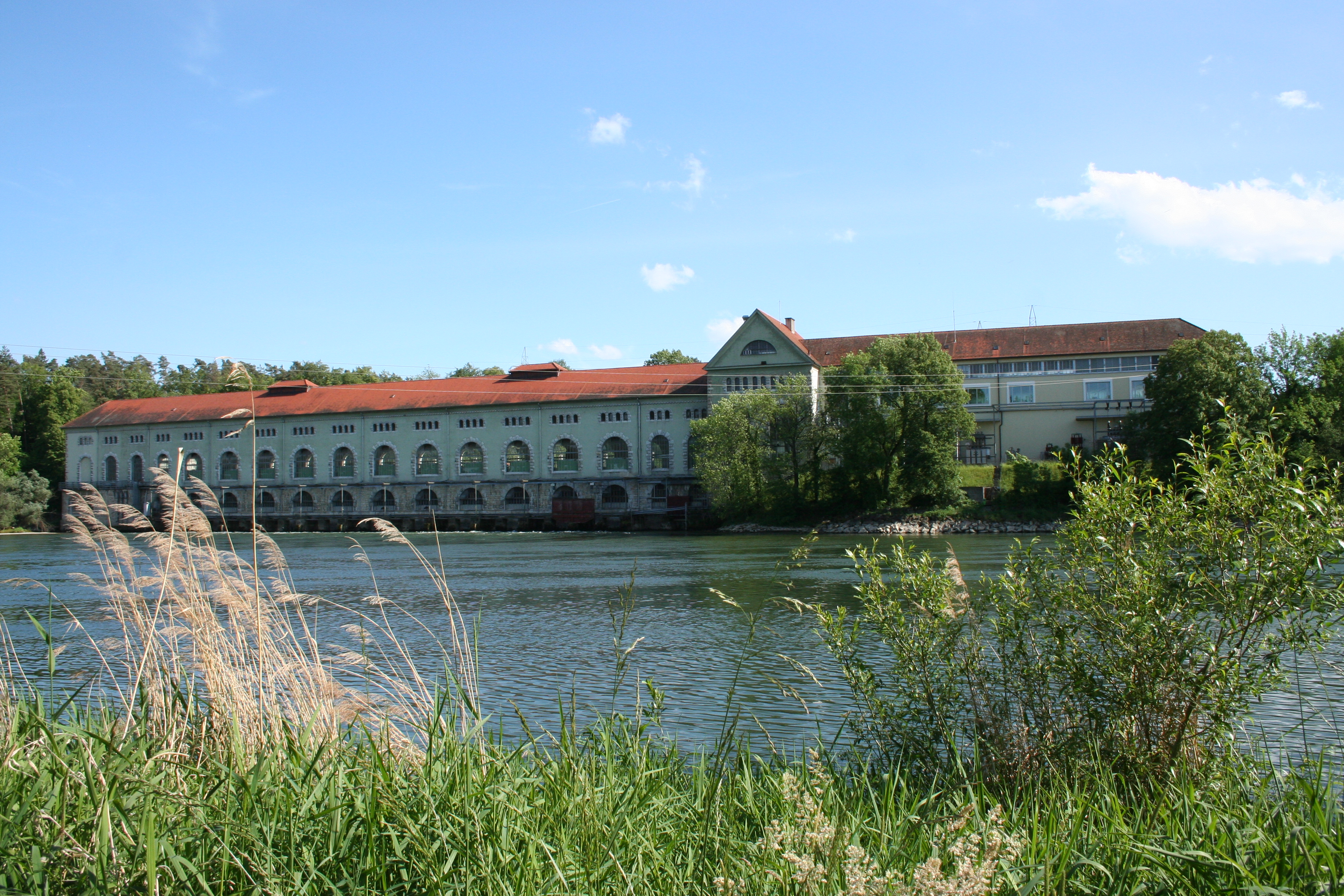
Hydroelectric plant at Beznau

As of 2007, Döttingen had an unemployment rate of 3.22%. As of 2005, there were 48 people employed in the primary economic sector and about 17 businesses involved in this sector. 1,000 people are employed in the secondary sector and there are 49 businesses in this sector. 645 people are employed in the tertiary sector, with 111 businesses in this sector.

In 2000 there were 1,589 workers who lived in the municipality. Of these, 1,151 or about 72.4% of the residents worked outside Döttingen while 1,107 people commuted into the municipality for work. There were a total of 1,545 jobs (of at least 6 hours per week) in the municipality. Of the working population, 12.3% used public transportation to get to work, and 54.1% used a private car.

== Religion ==
From the 2000 census, 1,865 or 57.5% were Roman Catholic, while 514 or 15.9% belonged to the Swiss Reformed Church. Of the rest of the population, there were 11 individuals (or about 0.34% of the population) who belonged to the Christian Catholic faith.

== Education ==
The entire Swiss population is generally well educated. In Döttingen about 58.1% of the population (between age 25-64) have completed either non-mandatory upper secondary education or additional higher education (either university or a Fachhochschule). Of the school age population (in the 2008/2009 school year), there are 295 students attending primary school, there are 115 students attending secondary school in the municipality.
