= Waldshut–Koblenz Rhine Bridge =

Railway bridge between Germany and Switzerland

Coordinates: 47°36′33.5″N 8°14′2.6″E

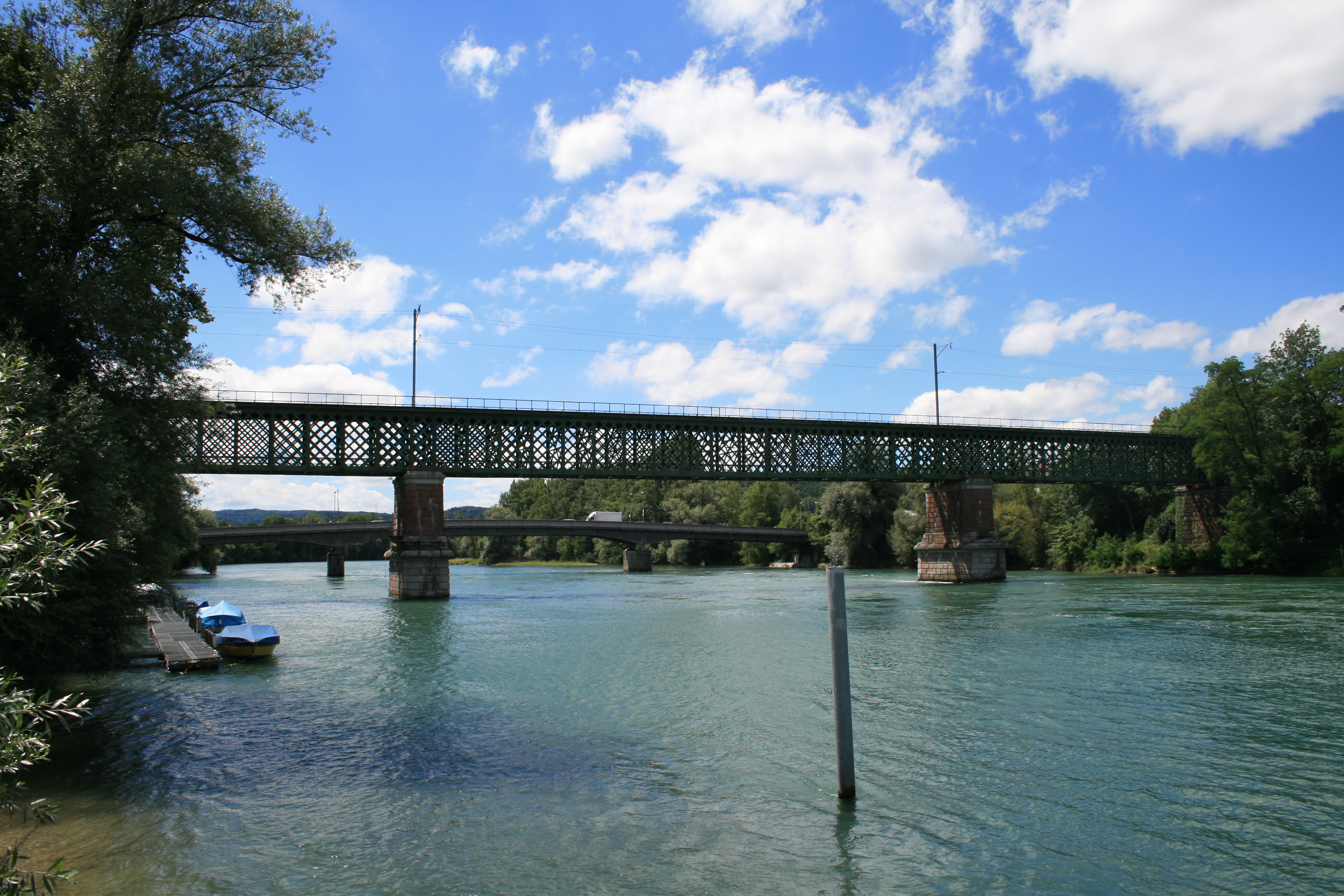
Waldshut–Koblenz Rhine Bridge

The Waldshut–Koblenz Rhine Bridge is a single-track railway bridge on the Turgi–Koblenz–Waldshut railway, between Waldshut and Koblenz AG, crossing the Rhine and the border between Germany and Switzerland. It was the first railway bridge built over the Rhine below Lake Constance. It is the only major railway bridge over the Rhine, which is completely preserved in its original condition and is one of Europe's few lattice truss bridges. It is also one of the oldest railway bridges in the world.

The bridge carries passenger services of line S27 of Aargau S-Bahn, operating between Baden and Waldshut, and line S36 of Zurich S-Bahn, operating between Bülach and Waldshut.

== History ==
On 26 August 1857 the Grand Duchy of Baden State Railways signed an agreement with the Swiss Northeastern Railway to construct the cross-border Turgi–Koblenz–Waldshut railway, including the Rhine bridge. Thus on 18 August 1859, the line was commissioned as the first connection between the Baden Mainline and the Swiss railway network. The current main rail connection between Germany and Switzerland, the Basel Link Line, was opened 14 years later. The Baden architect Robert Gerwig designed the bridge and managed its construction. The steel superstructure was supplied and installed by the Gebrüder Benckiser company of Pforzheim. The bridge was designed for two tracks, but only one track was installed. Due to increasing traffic loads, the bridge was strengthened in 1912 and 1913, being reinforced to carry 18 tonnes (20 tons) axle loads and then the track was moved from the eastern side of the bridge to the middle. The demolition of the bridge planned by the German army on 24 April 1945 was not in fact carried out, so the technical landmark of the bridge in its original design is still preserved today.

In 1967 a speed restriction of 10 kilometres per hour (6.2 mph) was imposed on the bridge because the bridge’s age and safety concerns. A report of the University of Karlsruhe in 1974 estimated the bridge’s remaining useful life as 10 to 15 years, provided that new corrosion protection was applied; this was carried out in 1978. Ten years later Deutsche Bundesbahn closed the line, after Swiss Federal Railways (SBB), the owners of half the bridge, refused a request for an updated report on the bridge. This was followed in 1991 by extensive repair work, including local reinforcement measures and renewed anti-corrosion measures, allowing the maximum speed for passenger trains to be raised to 45 kilometres per hour (28 mph) and extending the bridge’s useful remaining life to 40 years. Until the electrification of the Waldshut–Koblenz gap in 1999, passenger services on the bridge were carried out by diesel multiple units of Deutsche Bahn. From 1999, SBB took over management of services on the bridge using electric multiple units. In 2007, about 34 trains daily operated as line S41 of the Zürich S-Bahn between Waldshut and Winterthur. In 2018, the S41 was shortened, now serving only the route between Winterthur and Bülach; the service from Bülach to Waldshut was designated S36.

In late 2011, the SBB introduced refurbished Class 560 electric multiple units to the S27 line. Unfortunately the refurbishment, which included the introduction of air conditioning, took the axle loading of a fully loaded power car over the maximum 18 tonnes (20 tons) for the bridge. As a temporary solution, the power cars were locked out of use whilst passing over the bridge, and the trains limited to 10 kilometres per hour (6.2 mph). Following work on the bridge, these restrictions were lifted in early 2014.

== Construction ==
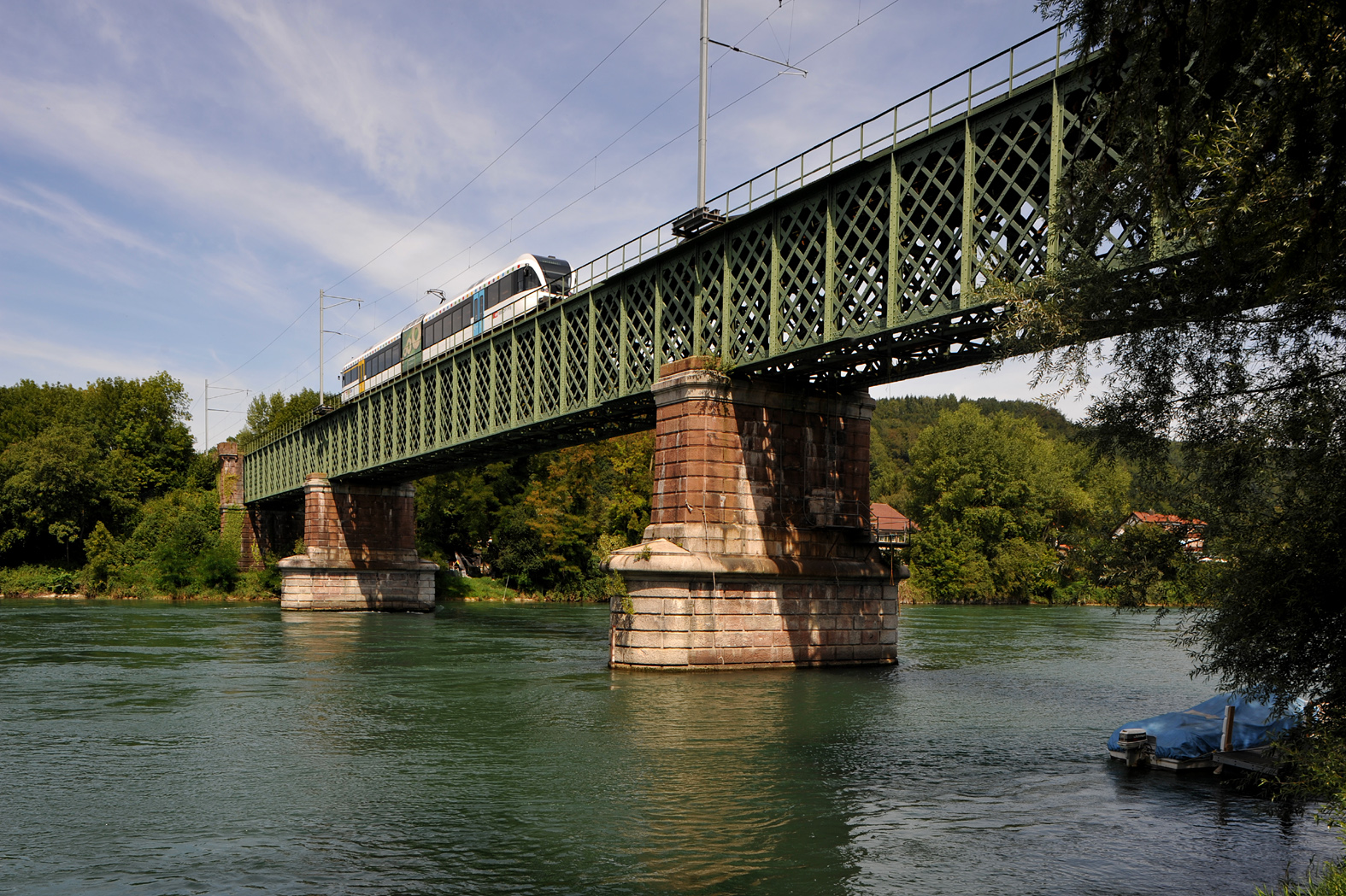
Bridge from below

The c. 190-metre-long (620 ft) bridge section has a track on the upper level of the truss bridge and its spans over the Rhine consist of two outer spans that are 37.24 metres (122.2 ft) long and a central span of 54.90 metres (180.1 ft). This is followed on the Swiss bank by a brick viaduct with six semi-circular arches, having an inside diameter of 7.5 metres (25 ft). The greatly varying spans of the main bridge result from the nature of the currents in the Rhine. On the German side, after the line runs on an embankment for some 50 metres (160 ft), it crosses over the E54 on a modern concrete arch bridge.

The superstructure of the lattice truss bridge is made of wrought iron and is box shaped in cross-section. At has a continuous beam along its length. It has two vertical close-knit, grid-like lattice truss with a height of 5.13 metres (16.8 ft) and a track base of 4.95 metres (16.2 ft). The diagonal struts are formed from flat steel and riveted together at the intersections. The vertical pillars consist of four riveted corners.

The foundation of the pillars are built on driven wooden piles that are about 10 metres (33 ft) long, topped by concrete pile caps. The tops of the pillars are 14 metres (46 ft) high and 3 metres (9.8 ft) wide and made of stone masonry.

=== Assembly ===
The superstructure of the current bridge was assembled in three sections on the Waldshut bank in a temporary work hall. After completion of the first segment, it was rolled out of the hall. Then the second segment was built, and on its completion was connected with the first. Finally, the third segment was built and the entire length of 131 metres (430 ft) was assembled. The actual installation of the bridge was carried with the support of piles in the Rhine, using of a 10.5-metre-long (34 ft) wooden launching nose, propelled over a runway. The launching of the superstructure was carried out using human-powered transport mechanisms.

== See also ==
- List of bridges over the Rhine

== Bibliography ==
- Scharf, Hans-Wolfgang (2003). Eisenbahn-Rheinbrücken in Deutschland (in German). Freiburg: EK-Verlag. ISBN 3-88255-689-7.
- Schlaich, Jörg; Schüller, Matthias (1999). Ingenieurbauführer Baden-Württemberg (in German). Berlin: Bauwerk Verlag. ISBN 3-934369-01-4.
- Gesellschaft für Ingenieurbaukunst, ed. (2001). Schweizer Eisenbahnbrücken (in German). Zürich: vdf Hochschulverlag AG. ISBN 978-3-7281-2786-0.
