= Baden railway station =

Train station in Baden, Switzerland

Baden
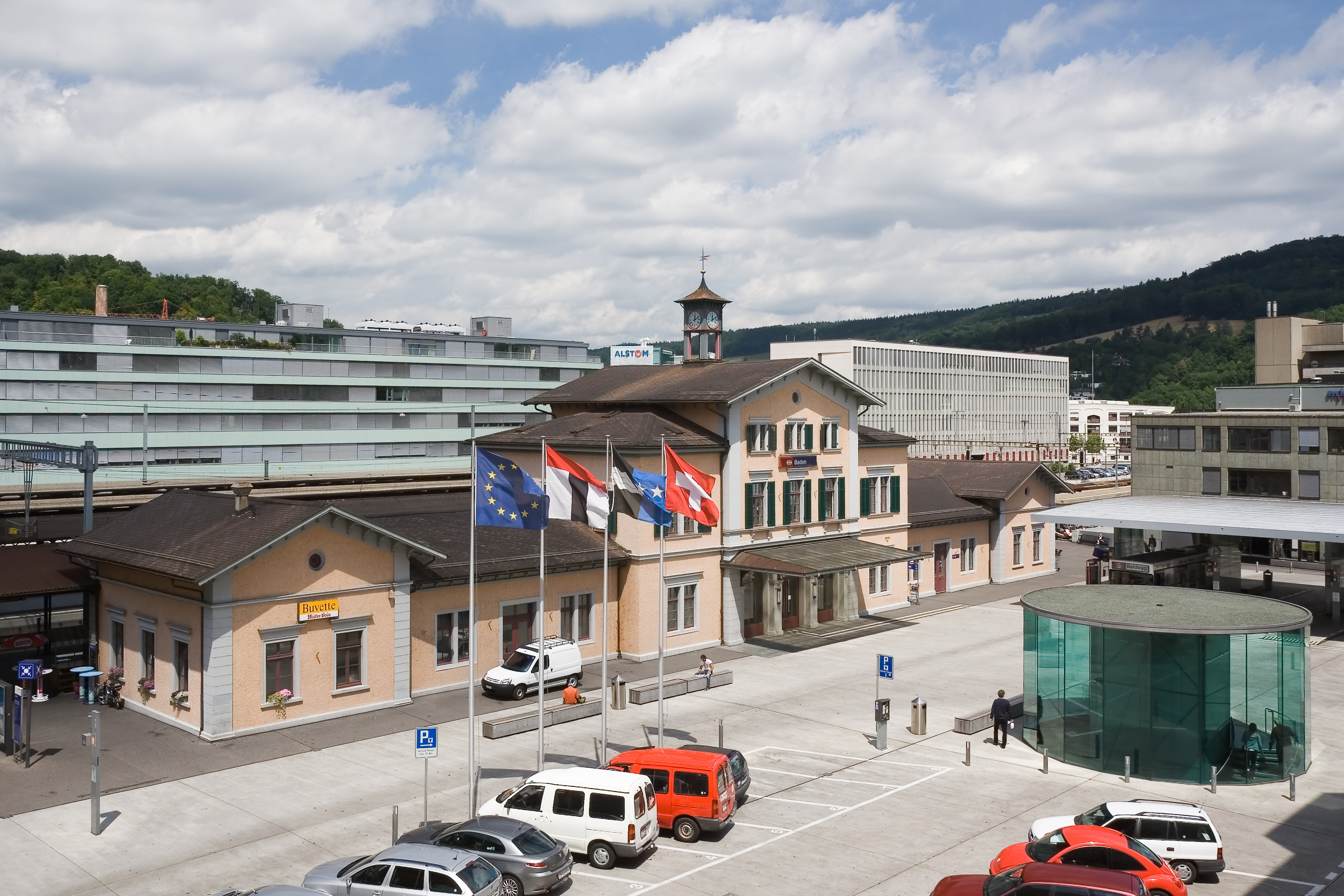
- The station building and the Bahnhofplatz in 2007

General information
- Location: Bahnhofstrasse 25; Baden, Aargau; Switzerland
- Coordinates: 47°28′34″N 8°18′29″E
- Elevation: 385 m (1,263 ft)
- Owner: Swiss Federal Railways (since 1902); Schweizerische Nordostbahn (1853–1902); Schweizerische Nordbahn (1847–1853)
- Lines: Baden–Aarau railway line; Bözberg railway line; Zürich–Baden railway line
- Distance: 22.5 km (14.0 mi) from Zürich HB
- Platforms: 3
- Tracks: 5
- Train operators: Swiss Federal Railways
- Connections: PostAuto Schweiz and Regionale Verkehrsbetriebe Baden-Wettingen

Construction
- Architect: Ferdinand Stadler

Other information
- Fare zone: 570 (Tarifverbund A-Welle)

History
- Opened: 9 August 1847

Passengers
- 2025: 34,000 per day (SBB)
- Rank: 19 out of 1,095

Services
Preceding station	SBB CFF FFS	Following station
Brugg AG towards Bern	IR 16	Zürich HB Terminus
Brugg AG towards Basel SBB	IR 36	Dietikon towards Zürich Airport
Turgi towards Olten	RE12	Wettingen Terminus
Preceding station	Zurich S-Bahn	Following station
Terminus	S6	Wettingen towards Uetikon
Turgi towards Brugg AG	S12	Wettingen towards Schaffhausen or Wil
Turgi towards Koblenz	S19	Wettingen towards Pfäffikon ZH
Turgi towards Aarau	SN1 Limited service	Wettingen towards Winterthur
Preceding station	Aargau S-Bahn	Following station
Turgi towards Langenthal	S23	Terminus
Turgi towards Waldshut or Bad Zurzach	S27	Terminus
Location

Baden railway station (German: Bahnhof Baden) serves the municipality of Baden, in the canton of Aargau, Switzerland. Opened in 1847, it is owned and operated by SBB-CFF-FFS.

The station forms part of the Bözberg railway line, which links Basel with Zürich. It is also on the Zürich–Baden railway and the Baden–Aarau railway, which both form part of the original line connecting Zürich and Olten.

== Location ==
Baden railway station is situated in the Bahnhofstrasse, close to the centre of the town. It has one side platform and two island platforms serving five tracks.

== Services ==
As of the December 2023 timetable change, the following services stop at Baden:

- InterRegio:
  - : hourly service between Bern and Zürich HB.
  - : two trains per hour between Basel SBB and Zürich HB; every other train continues from Zürich HB to Zürich Airport.
- RegioExpress: hourly service between Olten and Wettingen.
- Zürich S-Bahn:
  - S6: half-hourly service to Uetikon.
  - S12: half-hourly service between Brugg AG and Winterthur; hourly service to Schaffhausen or Wil.
  - S19: peak-hour service between Koblenz and Pfäffikon ZH.
  - SN1: on Friday and Saturday night, hourly service between Aarau and Winterthur via Zürich Stadelhofen.
- Aargau S-Bahn:
  - S23: hourly service to Langenthal.
  - S27: half-hourly service to Koblenz and hourly service to Waldshut or Bad Zurzach.

== See also ==
- Rail transport in Switzerland
