= Koblenz railway station (Switzerland) =

Railway station in Koblenz in the canton of Aargau, Switzerland

Koblenz
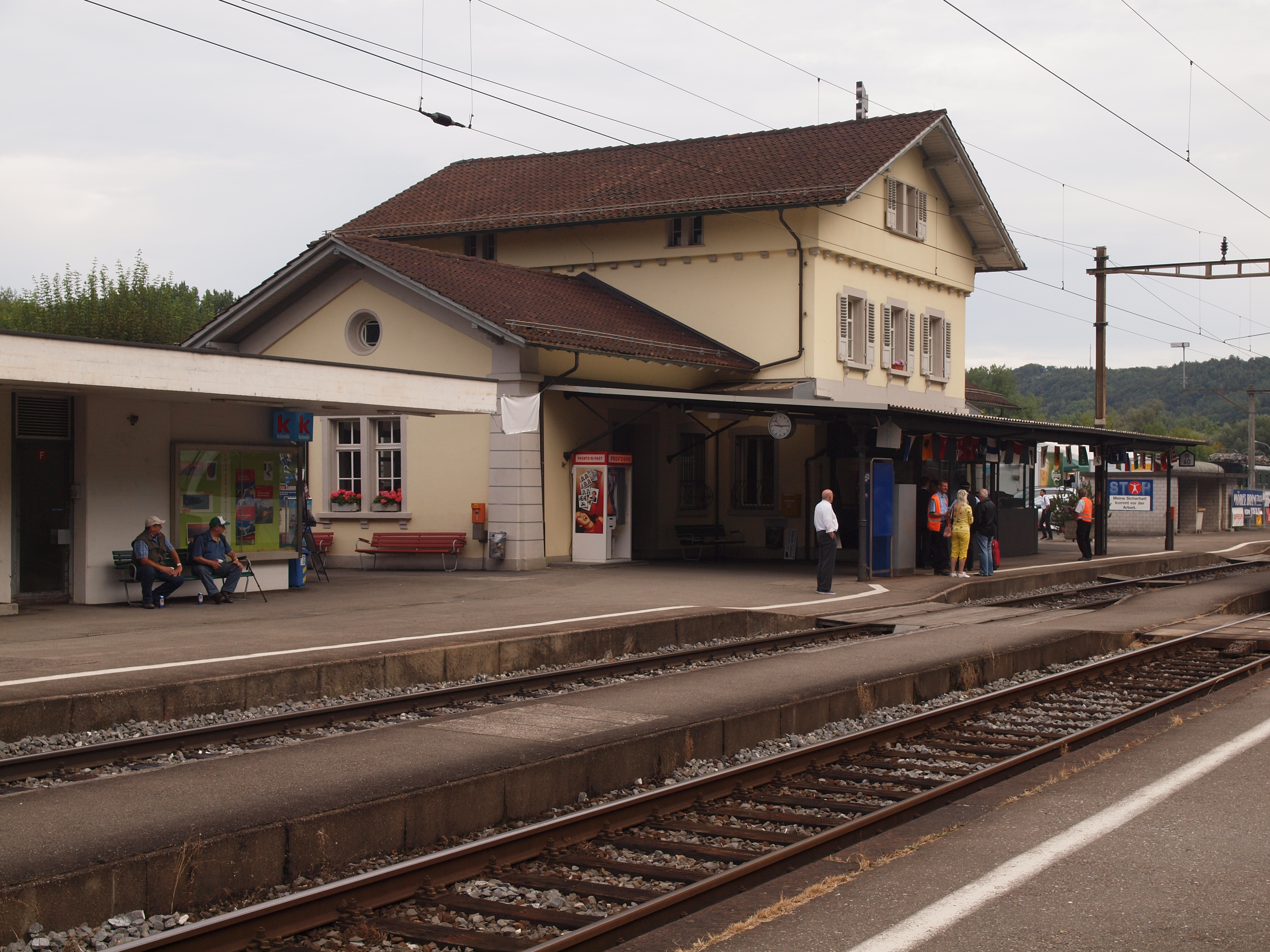
- The station building in 2009

General information
- Location: Bahnhofstrasse; Koblenz, Aargau; Switzerland
- Coordinates: 47°36′01″N 8°13′38″E
- Elevation: 320 m (1,050 ft)
- Owner: Swiss Federal Railways
- Lines: Turgi–Koblenz–Waldshut line; Winterthur–Bülach–Koblenz line; Koblenz–Stein-Säckingen line
- Distance: 41.4 km (25.7 mi) from Zürich; 48.4 km (30.1 mi) from Winterthur
- Platforms: 1 side platform; 1 island platform
- Tracks: 3
- Train operators: Swiss Federal Railways; THURBO
- Connections: PostAuto Schweiz bus lines

Other information
- Fare zone: 563 (Tarifverbund A-Welle)

Passengers
- 2018: 3,300 per working day

Services
Preceding station	Aargau S-Bahn	Following station
Waldshut Terminus	S27	Klingnau towards Baden
Koblenz Dorf towards Bad Zurzach	S27	Klingnau towards Baden
Preceding station	Zurich S-Bahn	Following station
Terminus	S19	Klingnau towards Pfäffikon ZH
Waldshut Terminus	S36	Reverses direction
Koblenz Dorf towards Bülach	S36	Reverses direction
Location
- Location within Switzerland Location within Canton of Aargau

Koblenz railway station (German: Bahnhof Koblenz) is a railway station in the Swiss canton of Aargau and municipality of Koblenz. The station is located at junction of the Turgi to Waldshut railway line with the Winterthur to Koblenz line and the freight only Koblenz to Stein-Säckingen line.

Koblenz station should not be confused with Koblenz Dorf station, which is situated rather closer to the centre of Koblenz.

Because Koblenz is situated between the Aar and Rhine rivers at their confluence, the station is adjacent to two major railway bridges. The Waldshut–Koblenz Rhine railway bridge carries the Turgi to Waldshut line across the Rhine into Germany, whilst the Koblenz Aar railway bridge carries the line to Stein Säckingen over the river Aar.

== History ==
The station was opened on 1 August 1859.

The station underwent modernization and improvement works in 2013 during which an underpass was built enabling passengers to reach platforms without having to cross the railway tracks. Signals were also automated at that time and the station has since then no longer been staffed.

== Customs ==
Koblenz is, for customs purposes, a border station for passengers arriving from Germany. Customs checks may be performed aboard trains and in Koblenz station by Swiss officials. Systematic passport controls were abolished when Switzerland joined the Schengen Area in 2008.

== Services ==
As of the December 2020 timetable change, the following services stop at Koblenz:

- Aargau S-Bahn S27 / Zürich S-Bahn S36: half-hourly service between Waldshut and Bad Zurzach and hourly service from Bad Zurzach to Bülach.
- Aargau S-Bahn S27: half-hourly service to Baden.
- Zürich S-Bahn S19: rush-hour service to Pfäffikon ZH.

== See also ==
- Rail transport in Switzerland
