= Waldshut station =

Railway station in Waldshut-Tiengen, Germany

Waldshut
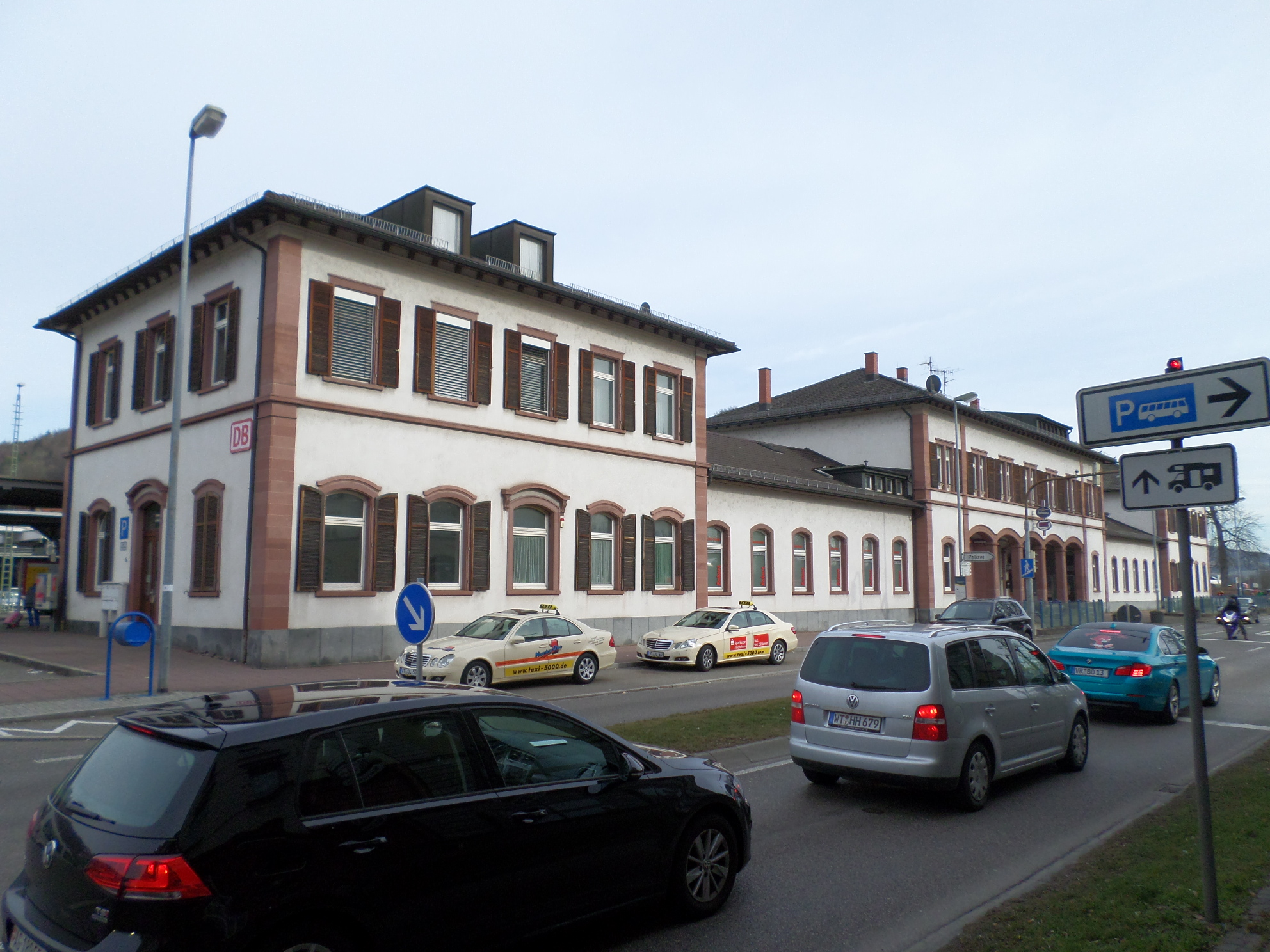
- The station in 2015

General information
- Location: Waldshut-Tiengen, Baden-Württemberg; Germany
- Coordinates: 47°37′17″N 8°13′10″E
- Owner: DB Netz
- Operator: DB Station&Service
- Lines: High Rhine Railway (KBS 730); Turgi–Koblenz–Waldshut line
- Distance: 321.1 km (199.5 mi) from Mannheim Hauptbahnhof
- Platforms: 1 island platform; 1 side platform
- Tracks: 4
- Train operators: DB Regio Baden-Württemberg; Swiss Federal Railways; THURBO
- Connections: Südbadenbus bus lines

Other information
- Fare zone: 2 and 3 (WTV), A-Welle 563

History
- Opened: 30 October 1856

Services
Preceding station	DB Regio Baden-Württemberg	Following station
Bad Säckingen towards Basel Bad Bf	RE 3	Tiengen (Hochrhein) towards Friedrichshafen Hafen
Terminus	RB 37	Tiengen (Hochrhein) towards Stühlingen or Weizen
Preceding station	Aargau S-Bahn	Following station
Terminus	S27	Koblenz towards Baden
Preceding station	Basel S-Bahn	Following station
Dogern towards Basel Bad Bf	RB30	Tiengen (Hochrhein) towards Lauchringen
Preceding station	Zurich S-Bahn	Following station
Terminus	S36	Koblenz towards Bülach
Location
- Location within Germany Location within Baden-Württemberg

Waldshut station (German: Bahnhof Waldshut) is a railway station in the city of Waldshut-Tiengen in the German state of Baden-Württemberg.

== History ==
The station was opened on 30 October 1856.

== Description ==
The station lies on the High Rhine Railway, which connects Basel and Singen along the northern and, mostly, German bank of the Rhine. It is the junction point for the Turgi–Koblenz–Waldshut line, which crosses the Rhine from Switzerland on the Waldshut to Koblenz railway bridge just to the south of the station.

The Upper Rhine Railway has yet to be electrified and most services are operated by diesel locomotives or railcars, although electrification has been agreed upon and is planned. The line from Switzerland is electrified using the Swiss standard of 15 kV and 16.7 Hz from an overhead line. Only one terminal platform's track in the station is electrified, and this is used by all trains from Switzerland.

== Customs ==
Passengers using Platform 5 which serves trains running to and from Switzerland are subject to customs formalities from both countries as the train line lies on a customs border. Checks may occur in Waldshut station by German customs officers as well as on the train by Swiss customs officials. Checks by the Swiss may also take place in the first Swiss station, namely Koblenz. Systematic passport controls were abolished when Switzerland joined the Schengen Area in 2008.

== Train services ==
The station is a border station and as such is in local transport tariff zones in both Germany and Switzerland.

As of the December 2023 timetable change, the following services stop at Waldshut:

- RE 3: hourly service between Basel Bad Bf and Singen (Hohentwiel); every other train continues from Singen to Ulm Hauptbahnhof.
- Regionalbahn (RB):
  - RB30: hourly service between Basel Bad Bf and Lauchringen.
  - RB 37: infrequent weekday service to Stühlingen (–Weizen).
- Aargau S-Bahn S27: hourly service to Baden.
- Zürich S-Bahn S36: hourly service to Bülach.

== See also ==
- Rail transport in Germany
