= Turgi–Koblenz–Waldshut railway line =

Railway line in Switzerland

Turgi–Koblenz–Waldshut

Overview
- Locale: Aargau, Switzerland and Baden-Württemberg, Germany

Technical
- Line length: 16.6 km (10.3 mi)
- Track gauge: 1,435 mm (4 ft 8 1/2 in) standard gauge
- Electrification: 15 kV/16.7 Hz AC overhead catenary
- Maximum incline: 1.2%

The Turgi–Koblenz–Waldshut railway line is a railway line in Switzerland. It runs from Turgi in Switzerland via Koblenz to Waldshut in Germany. The Turgi–Koblenz–Waldshut line was the first rail link between Germany and Switzerland. It was opened on 18 August 1859 by the Swiss Northeastern Railway (German: Schweizerische Nordostbahn, NOB). It provides a connection from the Baden–Brugg line in Turgi to the High Rhine Railway in Waldshut.

Two branch lines were later built to Koblenz station: on 1 August 1876 the Winterthur–Bülach–Koblenz railway line opened via Eglisau and Bülach to Winterthur, and on 1 August 1892 the line opened to Stein-Säckingen, connecting to Basel.

== History ==
The story begins two years before the opening of the Swiss Northern Railway. In 1845 a delegation travelled from Zürich to Baden to promote a concession for a railway from Basel to Waldshut. This would allow a connection towards Zürich. The line would cross the Aar river in Döttingen. It was proposed that the line would form an access route to a railway through the Splügen Pass or the Lukmanier Pass. In Zurich, however, a railway through the Gotthard Pass was favoured. Yet in 1847 a project to build a Lukmanier railway was approved, under an agreement "for the purpose of establishing a Lukmanier Railway Company". A bridge at Koblenz was well placed for such a railway. But after 1861, the NOB also supported the Gotthard project, while the Splügen project was filed away.

The route was just right for the NOB's planned network, as it allowed for a direct connection with the German rail network. Technically the slope of the Aare valley was ideal for the line and runs through a natural gap in the mountains to the Rhine valley. On 26 August 1857 a treaty was signed in Karlsruhe with a validity of 99 years (until 1956, although it was replaced by a new treaty in 1950). The treaty specified a maximum gradient of 1.2 percent and the operation three pairs of trains per day. The deadline for completion was set as 1 May 1860. This deadline was beaten and the line was opened on 18 August 1859. The line was single track, but the planning and construction provided for eventual duplication. So the embankments, culverts, tunnels and bridges were designed for two tracks.

The line was electrified during the Second World War because of coal shortages and rising coal prices. Electrical operations commenced between Turgi and Koblenz on 14 October 1944. The section between Koblenz and Waldshut, however, was electrified in 1999.

== Special features of the Koblenz–Waldshut line ==
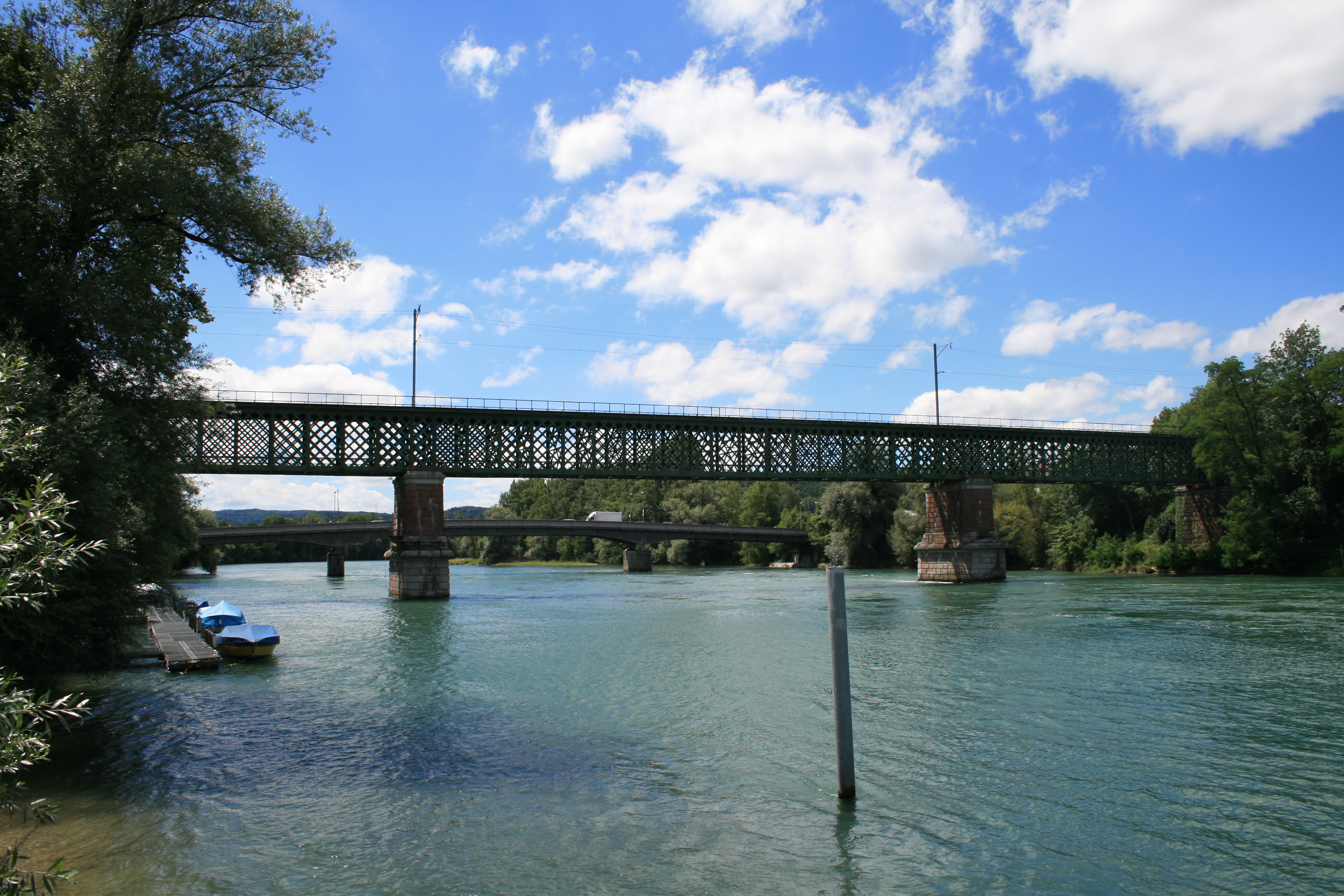
Waldshut–Koblenz Rhine Bridge

The property boundary between the Swiss Northeastern Railway (now part of Swiss Federal Railways Infrastructure) and the Grand Duchy of Baden State Railway (now part of DB Netze) was in the middle of the Waldshut–Koblenz Rhine Bridge, which the national border between Switzerland and Baden. The two participating companies each built their half of the bridge. The northern part of the bridge and the northern abutment are owned and are the responsibility of the German company, while the southern part and the southern abutment are owned by the Swiss company. This ownership is unusual, because the property boundaries of railways usually are immediately next to stations or service depots, but not in the middle of a line.

== Route ==
Immediately after Turgi station the line turns in a sharp curve to the north and cross a three span stone bridge over the Limmat. It then runs over an embankment and a cutting. Between Siggenthal-Würenlingen and Döttingen stations it includes a roughly five kilometre long, straight section that is not common in Switzerland. The distance of 6.6 kilometres between the two station is relatively long. On this stretch there are two sidings connecting to ZWILAG (an interim nuclear waste storage facility) and the Beznau Nuclear Power Plant. Döttingen station was called Döttingen Klingnau between 1897 and 2002, when the second half of the name was dropped, with the opening of Klingnau station.

Between Döttigen and Klingau the line runs along the natural terrain. The line's curve into Koblenz is very sharp and only allows a speed of 40 km/h. The Turgi–Koblenz section has a weight limit of 22.5 tons per axle and 8 tons per metre and thus the line is approved for class D4 traffic. After leaving the station in Koblenz, the line through a deep cutting through the 350-metre-high (1,150 ft) Frittel Hill and climbs a 1.2% grade to the 181-metre-long (594 ft) curved Koblenz Tunnel. The line runs over an embankment and a viaduct through the middle of the town of Koblenz, crossing the Winterthur–Bülach–Koblenz railway line and, about 150 metres later, the main road. The line then runs over one of the oldest railway bridges in Europe, the 190-metre-long (620 ft) bridge across the Rhine, the Waldshut–Koblenz Rhine Bridge. The northern embankment continues to Waldshut station. On the line between Koblenz and Waldshut the load limit is reduced for the Rhine Bridge to a load limit of 18 tons per axle and 5 tons per metre, corresponding to class B1 traffic.

=== Engineering structures ===
The route has three major engineering structures:

- The 78 metre-long three span stone bridge over the Limmat.
- The 181 metre-long tunnel in Koblenz.
- The 190 metre-long bridge over the Rhine, which has, on the Swiss side, a 60-metre brick approach, while the Rhine is crossed on a 130-metre-long steel truss, resting on two intermediate piers. The main part of the bridge dates back to its opening in 1859 and has only been reinforced since.

== Stations ==
The original three intermediate stations at Siggenthal, Döttingen and Koblenz have identical station building, which in turn are identical with the Rupperswil building on the Brugg–Aarau railway, built the same year.

Turgi station until its conversion between 1994 and 97 was a "wedge" station (Keilbahnhof).

Siggenthal-Würenlingen station was added in 1912 to serve the Siggenthal cement works, now part of Holcim and has a large volume of freight traffic.

Döttingen station was called Döttingen Klingnau station from 1897 to 2002. Klingnau station opened on 12 December 2002 with a 220-metre-long platform.

Koblenz station was built in a convenient location to the south of the actual village of Koblenz and has been a rail junction since the opening of the lines to Bülach and Winterthur and Stein-Säckingen. The NOB established a small locomotive depot at the station. Because of the unfavourable position of Koblenz station for the people Koblenz train, Koblenz Dorf station was established on the line to Winterthur in 1997. This stop is located close to the Rhine Bridge. Passenger traffic on the line to Stein-Säckingen has been transferred to road between Laufenburg and Koblenz.

Waldshut station was a border station and used to have customs controls. As a result, it had to be extended several times. Since Switzerland became part of the Schengen Area in 2008, checks on people have disappeared and the declaration of goods for customs is no longer carried out there. Waldshut station has also long had a locomotive depot.

== Traffic ==
The transit of freight over the Rhine Bridge was discontinued in 1991. Local freight traffic on the Rhine bridge was closed in 2001.

=== Schedule today (since 2008) ===
The Baden–Koblenz–Waldshut route has timetable number 701.

Trains run on the route every half hour. There is an hourly pair of trains between Baden and Zurzach and another pair between Baden and Waldshut (both running as line S27 of the Aargau S-Bahn). There is also a pair of trains on the Waldshut–Bülach–Winterthur route (line S36 of the Zurich S-Bahn, formerly S41), which reverses in Koblenz. All services run through Koblenz at the same time, so there is always a narrow period for transferring between trains.

In addition to passenger services on this line there are also freight trains serving the cement plant in Siggenthal (two trains a day for raw materials and three trains to export cement products). Also another freight service operates from Limmattal marshalling yard to Rekingen over the line. There are operations to freight sidings at Siggenthal-Würenlingen station and the other stations.
