= Bad Zurzach railway station =

Railway station in Bad Zurzach, Switzerland

Bad Zurzach
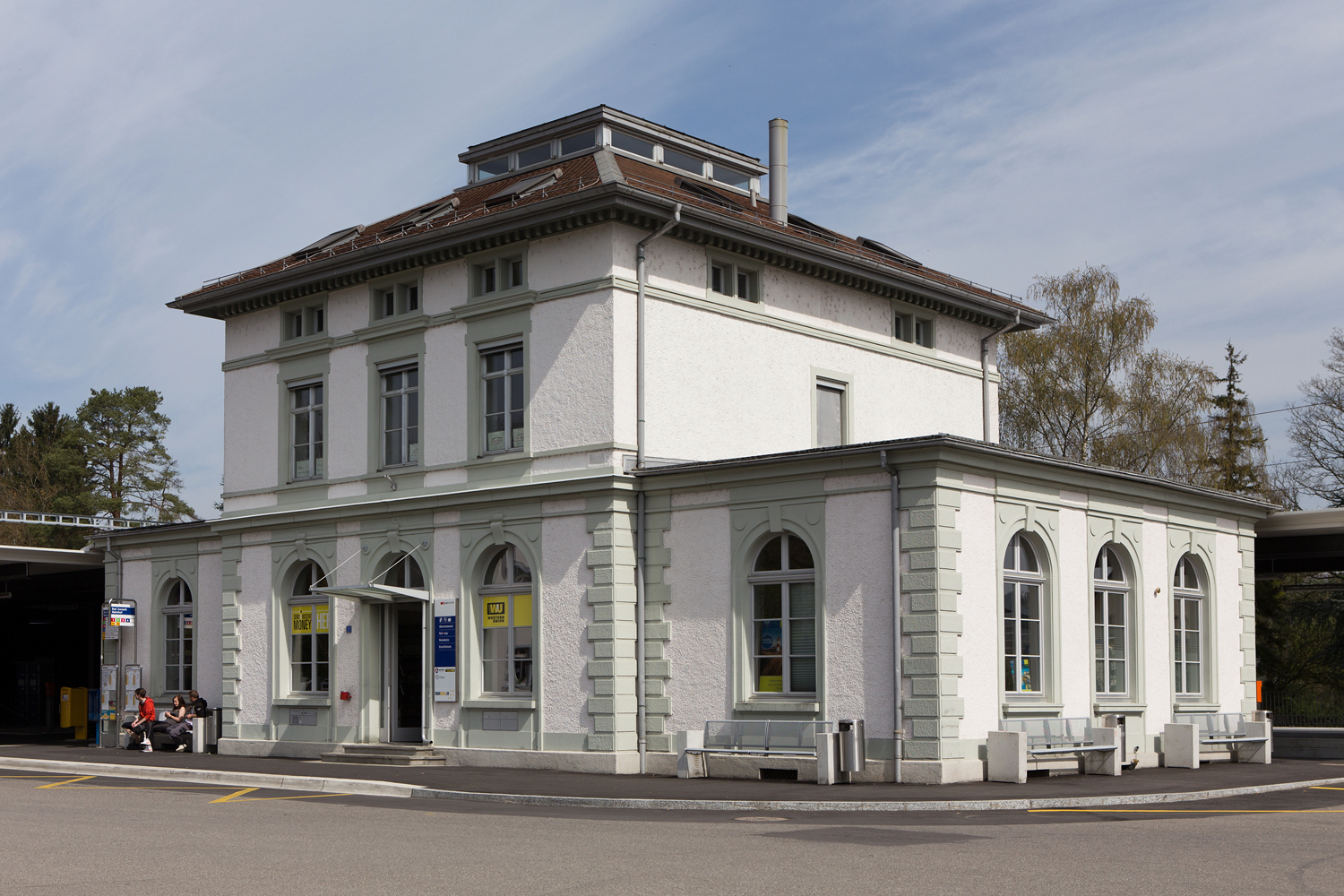
- The station building in 2014

General information
- Location: Bahnhofstrasse; Bad Zurzach, Aargau; Switzerland
- Coordinates: 47°35′18″N 8°17′44″E
- Elevation: 338 m (1,109 ft)
- Owner: Swiss Federal Railways
- Line: Winterthur–Bülach–Koblenz line
- Distance: 41.4 km (25.7 mi) from Winterthur
- Platforms: 2 side platforms
- Tracks: 2
- Train operators: Swiss Federal Railways; THURBO
- Connections: PostAuto Schweiz bus lines

Other information
- Fare zone: 563 (A-Welle)

History
- Former names: Zurzach (until 2007)

Passengers
- 2018: 1,600 per working day

Services
Preceding station	Aargau S-Bahn	Following station
Rietheim towards Baden	S27	Terminus
Preceding station	Zurich S-Bahn	Following station
Rietheim towards Waldshut	S36	Rekingen AG towards Bülach
Location

Bad Zurzach railway station (German: Bahnhof Bad Zurzach) is a railway station in the Swiss canton of Aargau and municipality of Bad Zurzach. The station is located on the Winterthur to Koblenz line of Swiss Federal Railways.

== Services ==
As of the December 2020 timetable change, the following services stop at Bad Zurzach:

- Aargau S-Bahn S27 / Zürich S-Bahn S36: half-hourly service to Waldshut and hourly service to Bülach and Baden.
