= Pfäffikon ZH railway station =

Railway station in Pfäffikon, Zurich, Switzerland

Pfäffikon ZH
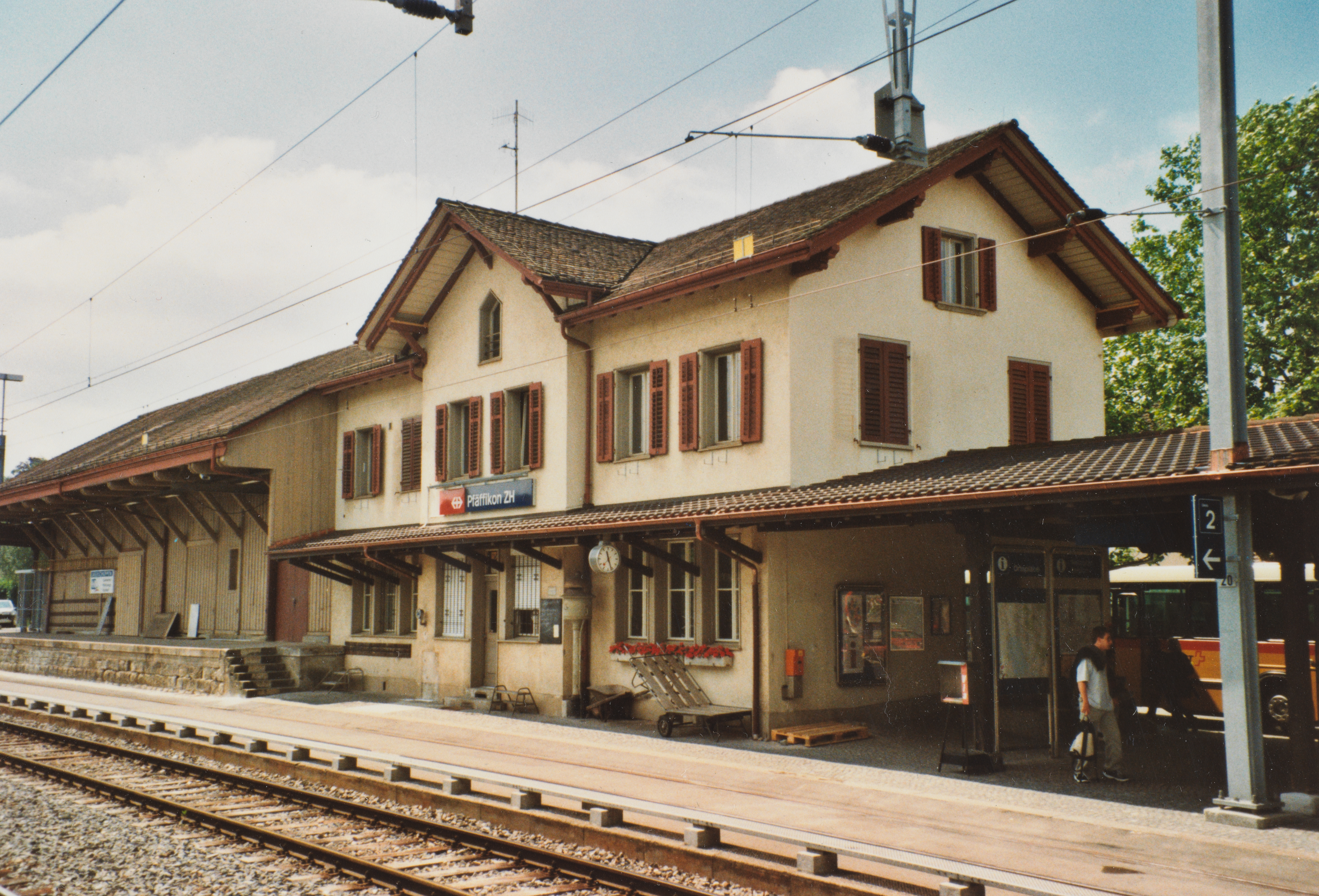
- Reception building in 1999

General information
- Location: Bahnhofstrasse, Pfäffikon, Canton of Zurich, Switzerland
- Coordinates: 47.367606°N 8.783762°E
- Elevation: 547 m (1,795 ft)
- Owner: Swiss Federal Railways
- Operator: Swiss Federal Railways
- Line: Effretikon–Hinwil line
- Platforms: 2 side platforms
- Tracks: 2
- Connections: ZVV
- Bus: PostAuto bus routes 825 826 830 831 833 835 837 859

Other information
- Fare zone: 135 (ZVV)

Passengers
- 2018: 6,400 per weekday

Services
Preceding station	Zurich S-Bahn	Following station
Fehraltorf towards Bülach	S3	Kempten towards Wetzikon
Fehraltorf towards Koblenz	S19	Terminus
Fehraltorf towards Lachen	SN8 Limited service	Terminus
Location
- Location within Switzerland Location within Canton of Zurich

Pfäffikon ZH (German: Bahnhof Pfäffikon ZH) is a railway station in the municipality of Pfäffikon in the canton of Zurich (ZH), Switzerland. The station is located on the Effretikon to Hinwil railway line, within fare zone 135 of the Zürcher Verkehrsverbund (ZVV).

== Services ==
Pfäffikon ZH is only served by S-Bahn trains. It is an intermediate stop on Zurich S-Bahn service S3 between Wetzikon and Zurich (Bülach during rush-hour). During peak periods, the station also serves as the eastern terminus of Zurich S-Bahn service S19, which operates between Koblenz and Pfäffikon. During weekends (Friday and Saturday nights), there is also a nighttime S-Bahn service (SN8) offered by ZVV. Summary of all S-Bahn services:

- Zurich S-Bahn:
  - S3: half-hourly service to Zürich Hardbrücke (or Bülach during peak hour) via Zürich HB, and to Wetzikon.
  - S19: half-hourly service during peak hours to Koblenz via Zürich HB.
  - Nighttime S-Bahn (only during weekends):
    - SN8: hourly service to Lachen via Zürich HB.

The station is also served by severals bus routes of PostAuto, which depart adjacent to the station.

== See also ==
- Rail transport in Switzerland
