= Koblenz, Switzerland =

Koblenz
- Municipality
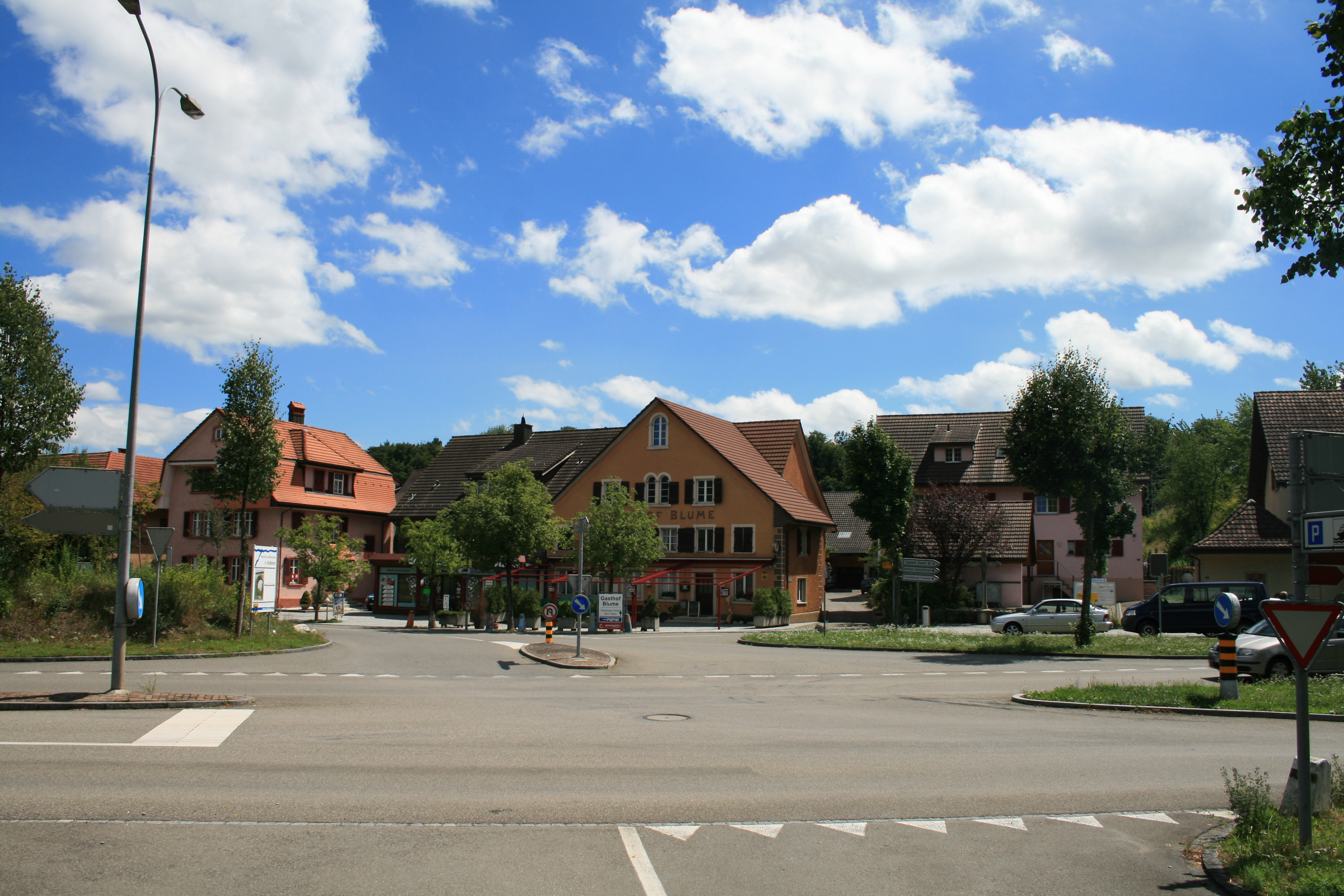

- Flag Coat of arms
- Location of Koblenz
- Location within Switzerland Location within Canton of Aargau
- Coordinates: 47°37′N 8°14′E
- Country: Switzerland
- Canton: Aargau
- District: Zurzach

Area
  - Total: 4.09 km^{2} (1.58 sq mi)
- Elevation: 319 m (1,047 ft)

Population (December 2004)
  - Total: 1,589
  - Density: 389/km^{2} (1,010/sq mi)
- Time zone: UTC+01:00 (CET)
  - Summer (DST): UTC+02:00 (CEST)
- Postal code: 5322
- SFOS number: 4310
- ISO 3166 code: CH-AG
- Surrounded by: Klingnau, Küssaberg (DE-BW), Leuggern, Rietheim, Waldshut-Tiengen (DE-BW)
- Website: www.koblenz.ch

Koblenz (or Coblenz) is a town and municipality in the district of Zurzach in the canton of Aargau in Switzerland.

== History ==
=== Middle Ages ===
Koblenz is first mentioned in 10th or 11th Century as Confluentia, for the confluence of the Aare and Rhine rivers. In 1265 it was mentioned as Cobilz. In the Roman era a goods yard and watchtowers existed along the Rhine at this place. The remaining late Roman watchtower is listed as a heritage site of national significance. The town has been settled since the Middle Ages. The Koblenz boatmen had a monopoly over transport of goods from the then important market town of Zurzach downstream along dangerous currents of the Rhine towards Basel.

=== 19th Century ===
With the arrival of the railway in the 19th century Koblenz and Zurzach lost this important source of income.

== Geography ==
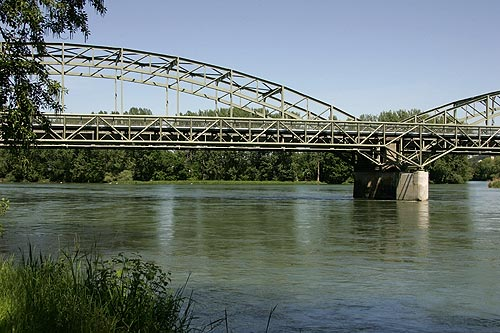
Confluence of the Aare and Rhine rivers

Aerial view from 300 m by Walter Mittelholzer (1925)

Koblenz has an area, as of 2009, of 4.08 square kilometers (1.58 sq mi). Of this area, 1.69 km^{2} (0.65 sq mi) or 41.4% is used for agricultural purposes, while 1.19 km^{2} (0.46 sq mi) or 29.2% is forested. Of the rest of the land, 0.8 km^{2} (0.31 sq mi) or 19.6% is settled (buildings or roads), 0.36 km^{2} (0.14 sq mi) or 8.8% is either rivers or lakes and 0.02 km^{2} (4.9 acres) or 0.5% is unproductive land.

Of the built up area, industrial buildings made up 1.7% of the total area while housing and buildings made up 9.1% and transportation infrastructure made up 7.8%. Out of the forested land, 26.0% of the total land area is heavily forested and 3.2% is covered with orchards or small clusters of trees. Of the agricultural land, 35.5% is used for growing crops and 5.6% is pastures. All the water in the municipality is flowing water.

The municipality is located in the Zurzach district, between the Aare and Rhine rivers. It lies opposite Waldshut in Baden-Württemberg, Germany. It consists of the haufendorf village (an irregular, unplanned and quite closely packed village, built around a central square) of Koblenz.

The village of Koblenz is known locally as the "Vier-Brücken-Dorf" (literally: village of four bridges). Two road and railway bridges each cross the Aar and the Rhine.

The like-named town Koblenz also lies on a confluence of the Rhine, with the river Mosel in Germany.

== Coat of arms ==
The blazon of the municipal coat of arms is Or a Bar wavy Azure in chief a boat with an oar Sable and in base a bendlet wavy of the second.

== Demographics ==
Koblenz has a population (as of December 2020) of 1,671. As of 2008, 29.7% of the population are foreign nationals. Over the last 10 years (1997–2007) the population has changed at a rate of -0.3%. Most of the population (as of 2000) speaks German (82.4%), with Albanian being second most common ( 4.3%) and Serbo-Croatian being third ( 3.7%).

As of 2008, the gender distribution of the population was 53.9% male and 46.1% female. The population was made up of 544 Swiss men (34.6% of the population), and 304 (19.3%) non-Swiss men. There were 470 Swiss women (29.9%), and 256 (16.3%) non-Swiss women. In 2008 there were 8 live births to Swiss citizens and 11 births to non-Swiss citizens, and in same time span there were 14 deaths of Swiss citizens and 3 non-Swiss citizen deaths. Ignoring immigration and emigration, the population of Swiss citizens decreased by 6 while the foreign population increased by 8. There were 22 non-Swiss men who emigrated from Switzerland to another country and 14 non-Swiss women who emigrated from Switzerland to another country. The total Swiss population change in 2008 was a decrease of 26 and the non-Swiss population change was an increase of 35 people. This represents a population growth rate of 0.6%.

The age distribution, as of 2008, in Koblenz is; 142 children or 9.0% of the population are between 0 and 9 years old and 218 teenagers or 13.8% are between 10 and 19. Of the adult population, 203 people or 12.8% of the population are between 20 and 29 years old. 195 people or 12.3% are between 30 and 39, 302 people or 19.1% are between 40 and 49, and 200 people or 12.6% are between 50 and 59. The senior population distribution is 151 people or 9.5% of the population are between 60 and 69 years old, 123 people or 7.8% are between 70 and 79, there are 44 people or 2.8% who are between 80 and 89, and there are 6 people or 0.4% who are 90 and older.

As of 2000 the average number of residents per living room was 0.6 which is about equal to the cantonal average of 0.57 per room. In this case, a room is defined as space of a housing unit of at least 4 m^{2} (43 sq ft) as normal bedrooms, dining rooms, living rooms, kitchens and habitable cellars and attics. About 43% of the total households were owner occupied, or in other words did not pay rent (though they may have a mortgage or a rent-to-own agreement).

As of 2000, there were 53 homes with 1 or 2 persons in the household, 329 homes with 3 or 4 persons in the household, and 204 homes with 5 or more persons in the household. As of 2000, there were 607 private households (homes and apartments) in the municipality, and an average of 2.6 persons per household. In 2008 there were 264 single family homes (or 39.5% of the total) out of a total of 669 homes and apartments. There were a total of 9 empty apartments for a 1.3% vacancy rate. As of 2007, the construction rate of new housing units was 2.6 new units per 1000 residents.

In the 2007 federal election the most popular party was the SVP which received 44.84% of the vote. The next three most popular parties were the SP (21.39%), the CVP (15.01%) and the FDP (8.83%). In the federal election, a total of 386 votes were cast, and the voter turnout was 44.7%.

The historical population is given in the following table:

Historical population
Year	Pop.	±%
1803	434	—
1850	709	+63.4%
1900	554	−21.9%
1950	882	+59.2%
1990	1,550	+75.7%
2000	1,611	+3.9%

== Heritage sites of national significance ==
The Koblenz Aar railway bridge (shared with Leuggern), the Koblenz–Waldshut Rhine railway bridge and the Kleiner Laufen, a watchtower remnant of the Roman Rhine border fortifications are listed as Swiss heritage sites of national significance.

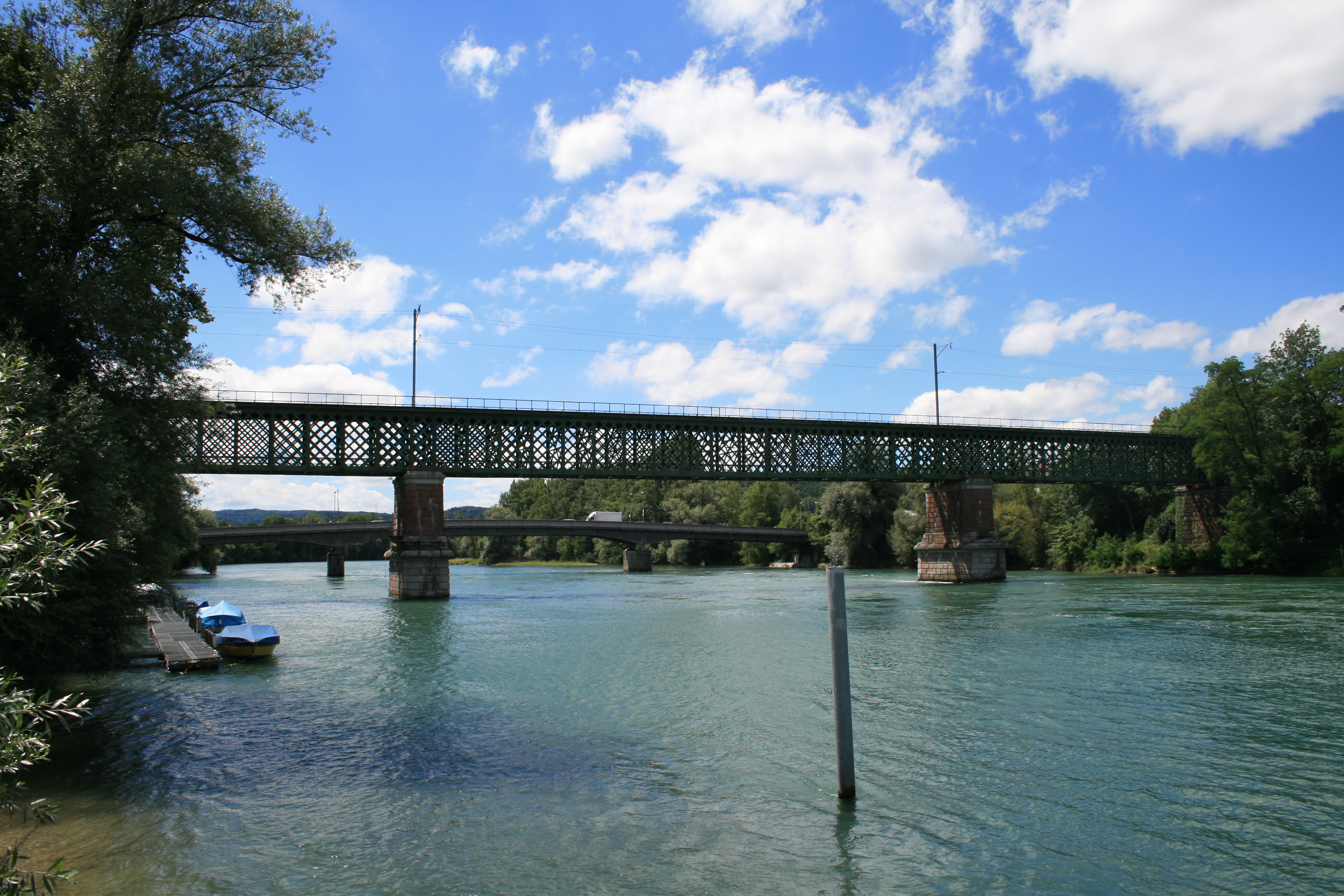
Koblenz-Waldhut bridge

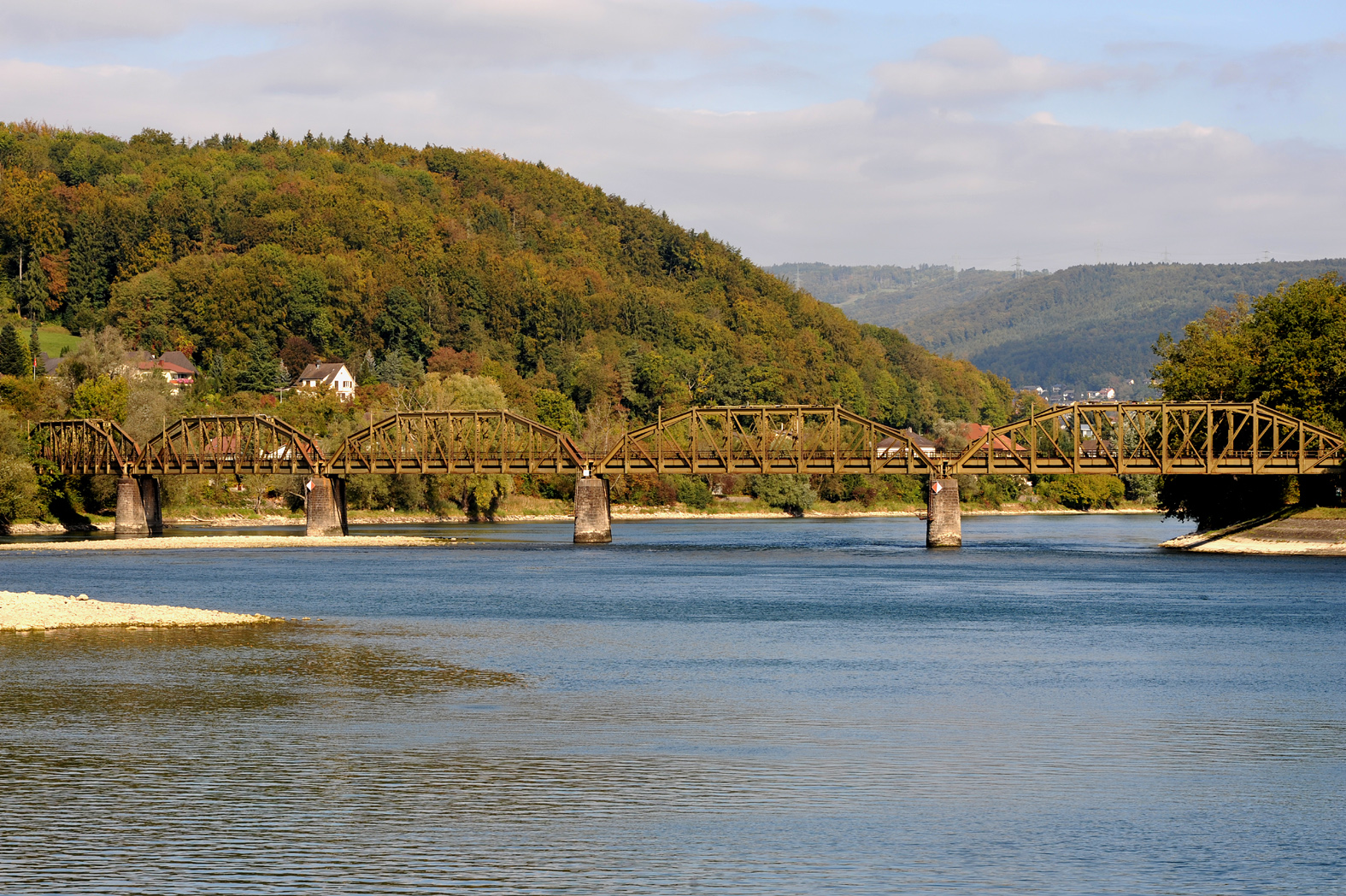
Koblenz-Felsenau bridge

== Economy ==
As of 2007, Koblenz had an unemployment rate of 2.57%. As of 2005, there were 16 people employed in the primary economic sector and about 5 businesses involved in this sector. 367 people are employed in the secondary sector and there are 23 businesses in this sector. 230 people are employed in the tertiary sector, with 47 businesses in this sector.

In 2000 there were 821 workers who lived in the municipality. Of these, 624 or about 76.0% of the residents worked outside Koblenz while 369 people commuted into the municipality for work. There were a total of 566 jobs (of at least 6 hours per week) in the municipality. Of the working population, 14.9% used public transportation to get to work, and 51% used a private car.

== Religion ==
From the 2000 census, 720 or 44.7% were Roman Catholic, while 446 or 27.7% belonged to the Swiss Reformed Church. Of the rest of the population, there were 7 individuals (or about 0.43% of the population) who belonged to the Christian Catholic faith.

== Education ==
The entire Swiss population is generally well educated. In Koblenz about 63.6% of the population (between age 25–64) have completed either non-mandatory upper secondary education or additional higher education (either university or a Fachhochschule). Of the school age population (in the 2008/2009 school year), there are 121 students attending primary school in the municipality.

== Transport ==
Koblenz is served by two railway stations. Koblenz station is served by Zurich S-Bahn line S36, which links Bülach and Waldshut, and Aargau S-Bahn line S27, which links Baden and Koblenz, with alternate trains continuing to either Waldshut or Bad Zurzach. Koblenz Dorf station is situated rather closer to the village centre, but is served by fewer trains.
