= Jón Laxdal =

Jón Laxdal may refer to:

- Jón Laxdal (actor), Icelandic-Swiss actor
- Jón Laxdal (composer), Icelandic composer
