= Rekingen =

- Former municipality
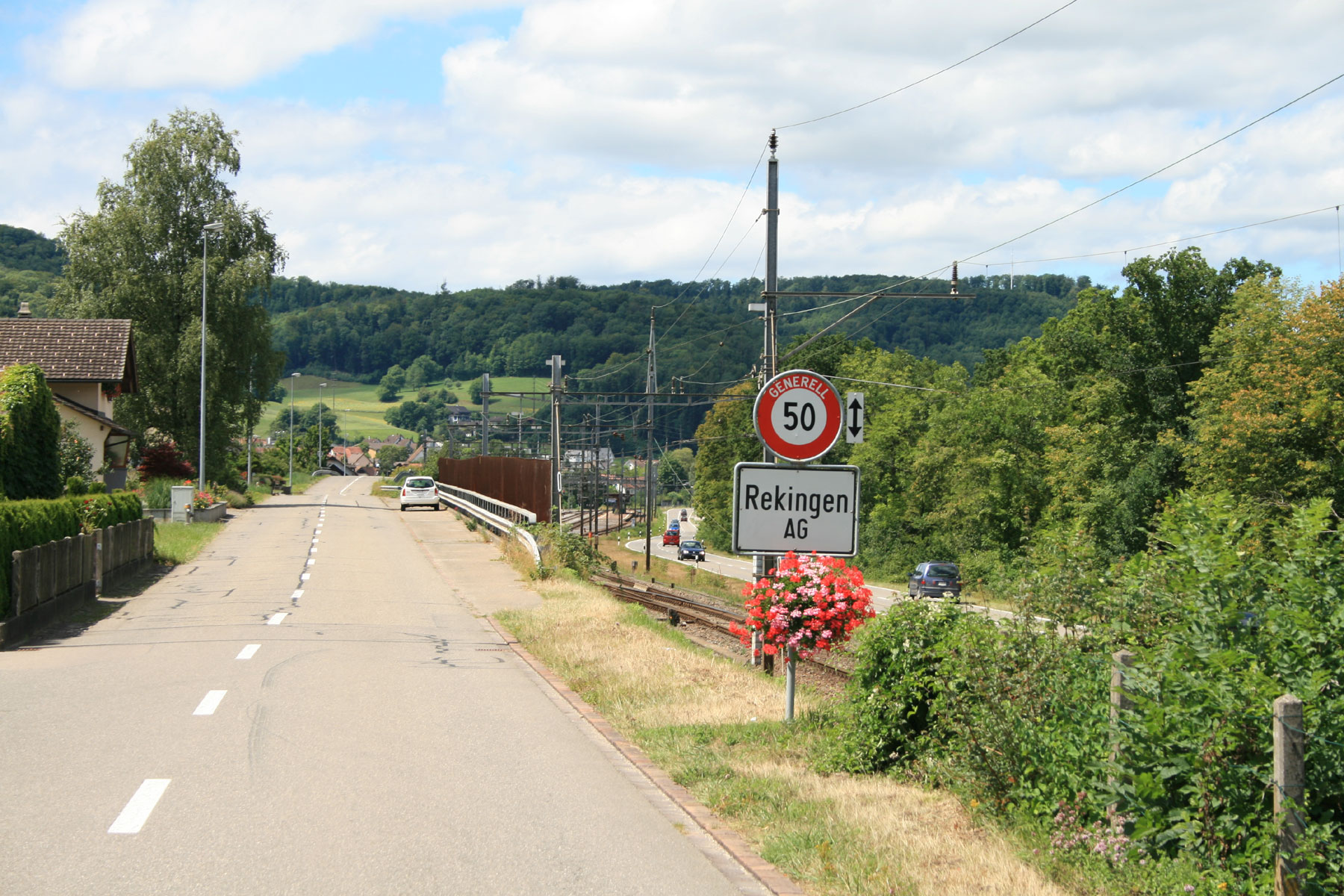

- Flag Coat of arms
- Location of Rekingen
- Location within Switzerland Location within Canton of Aargau
- Coordinates: 47°34′N 8°19′E
- Country: Switzerland
- Canton: Aargau
- District: Zurzach

Area
  - Total: 3.10 km^{2} (1.20 sq mi)
- Elevation: 338 m (1,109 ft)

Population (December 2005)
  - Total: 953
  - Density: 307/km^{2} (796/sq mi)
- Time zone: UTC+01:00 (CET)
  - Summer (DST): UTC+02:00 (CEST)
- Postal code: 5332
- SFOS number: 4315
- ISO 3166 code: CH-AG
- Surrounded by: Baldingen, Böbikon, Küssaberg (DE-BW), Mellikon, Tegerfelden, Zurzach
- Website: www.rekingen.ch

Rekingen is a village and former municipality in the district of Zurzach in the canton of Aargau in Switzerland. On 1 January 2022 the former municipalities of Bad Zurzach, Baldingen, Böbikon, Kaiserstuhl, Rekingen, Rietheim, Rümikon and Wislikofen merged into the new municipality of Zurzach.

== History ==
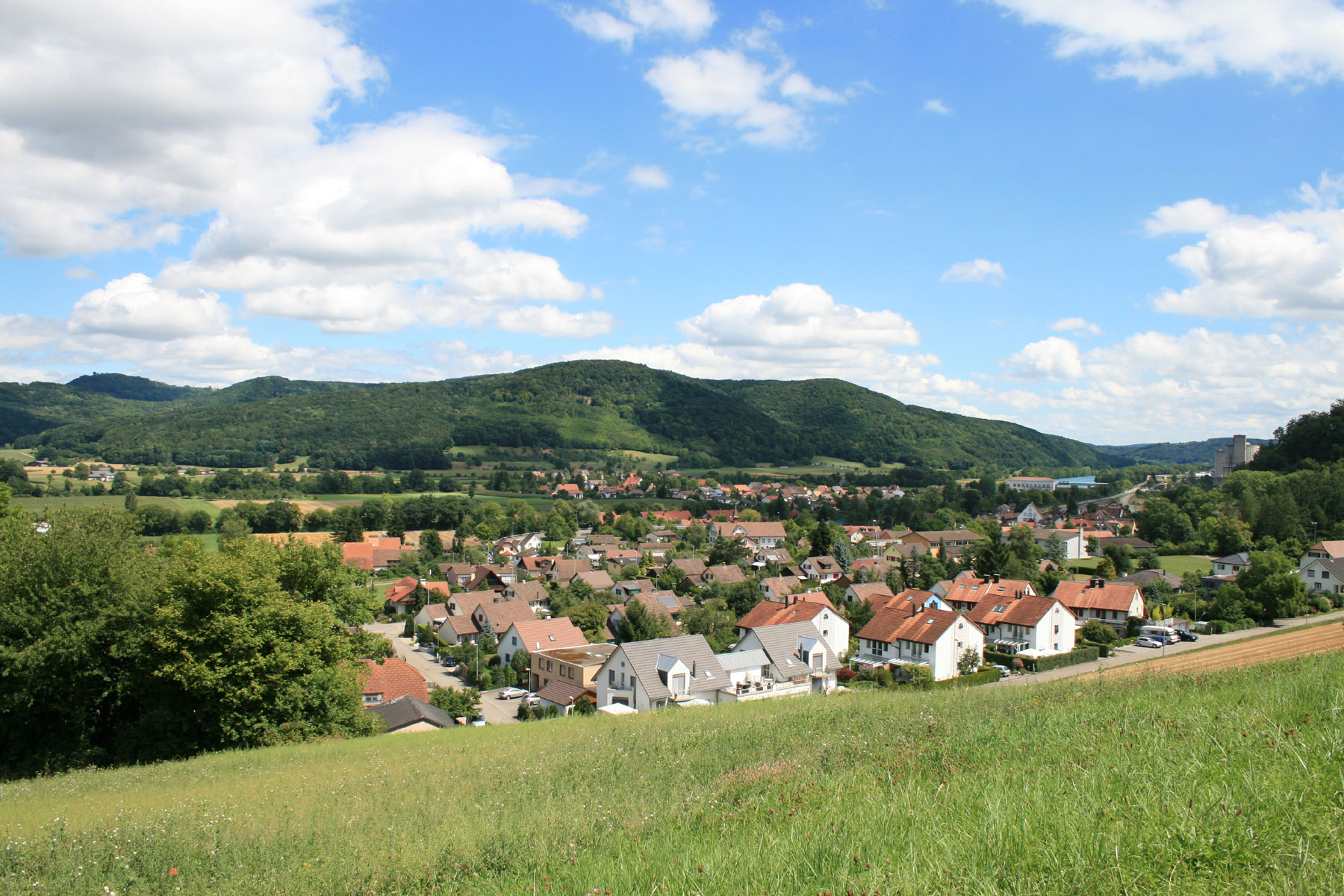
Rekingen

In 1956 an excavation discovered the remains of a Roman era estate (made with bricks from the 11th and 21st Legion in Vindonissa). Another excavation discovered Alamanni graves to the north of the train station. The modern municipality of Rekingen is first mentioned in 1261 as Rechunch. Rekingen belonged to the court of Klingnau, which from 1415 until 1798 was under the high court of Baden. The low court right lay with the Bishop of Constance and was exercised by Zurzach Abbey. During the Protestant Reformation the majority of the citizens converted of the new faith. In 1678, two canons from Zurzach, Johann Rudolf and Johann Jakob Schmid from Baar, built the Metzgerhof house and chapel. The chapel was deconsecrated in 1878 and since 1980 the old wine press building has been used as an ecumenical chapel. In 1790 the village school was segregated along denominational lines and was reintegrated in 1852.

The majority of the population lived on agriculture and viticulture. In the Middle Ages, there were three mills and a brick maker. In 1876, Rekingen received a mainline railway station on the Koblenz-Winterthur line. Between 1864 and 1989 a lime factory operated in Rekingen. There was also a cement plant from 1975 to 1995 and a hardware factory between 1955 and 2001. In 1914 the Swiss Sodafabrik (name was changed in 1922 to Solvay), was founded on a factory site which was half in Rekingen and half in Zurzach.

== Geography ==
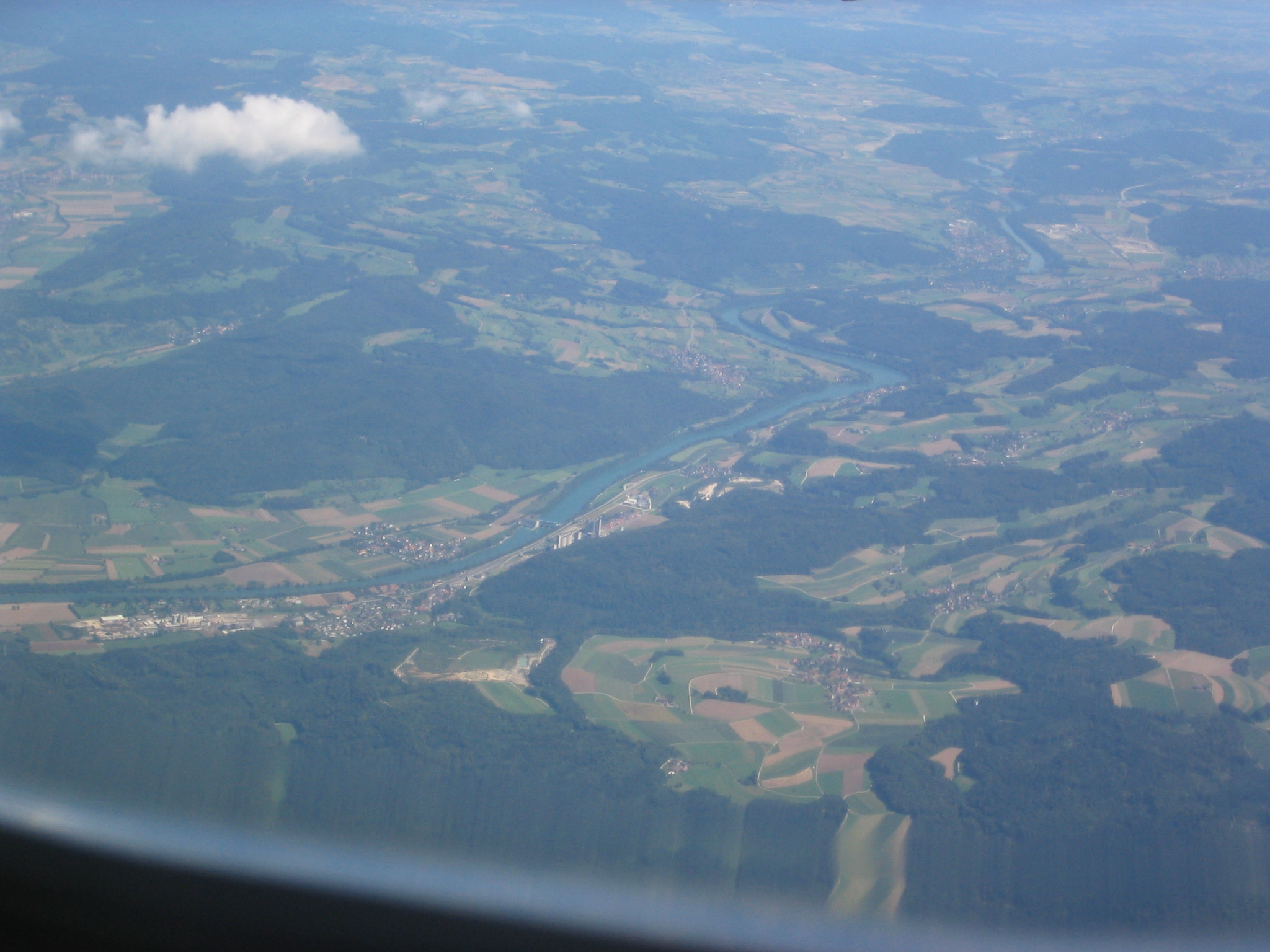
Aerial view of the Rhine with Rekingen in the foreground, south of the Rhine

Rekingen has an area, as of 2009, of 3.1 square kilometers (1.2 sq mi). Of this area, 0.43 km^{2} (0.17 sq mi) or 13.9% is used for agricultural purposes, while 1.78 km^{2} (0.69 sq mi) or 57.4% is forested. Of the rest of the land, 0.79 km^{2} (0.31 sq mi) or 25.5% is settled (buildings or roads), 0.12 km^{2} (30 acres) or 3.9% is either rivers or lakes.

Of the built up area, industrial buildings made up 6.5% of the total area while housing and buildings made up 6.8% and transportation infrastructure made up 4.2%. Power and water infrastructure as well as other special developed areas made up 7.1% of the area Out of the forested land, 54.5% of the total land area is heavily forested and 2.9% is covered with orchards or small clusters of trees. Of the agricultural land, 4.5% is used for growing crops and 9.0% is pastures. All the water in the municipality is flowing water.

The municipality is located in the Zurzach district, along the Rhine river near the Böbikon valley. It consists of the haufendorf village (an irregular, unplanned and quite closely packed village, built around a central square) of Rekingen.

== Coat of arms ==
The blazon of the municipal coat of arms is Per fess Or a letter R sable and Azure a base-semi Mill Wheel of the first.

== Demographics ==
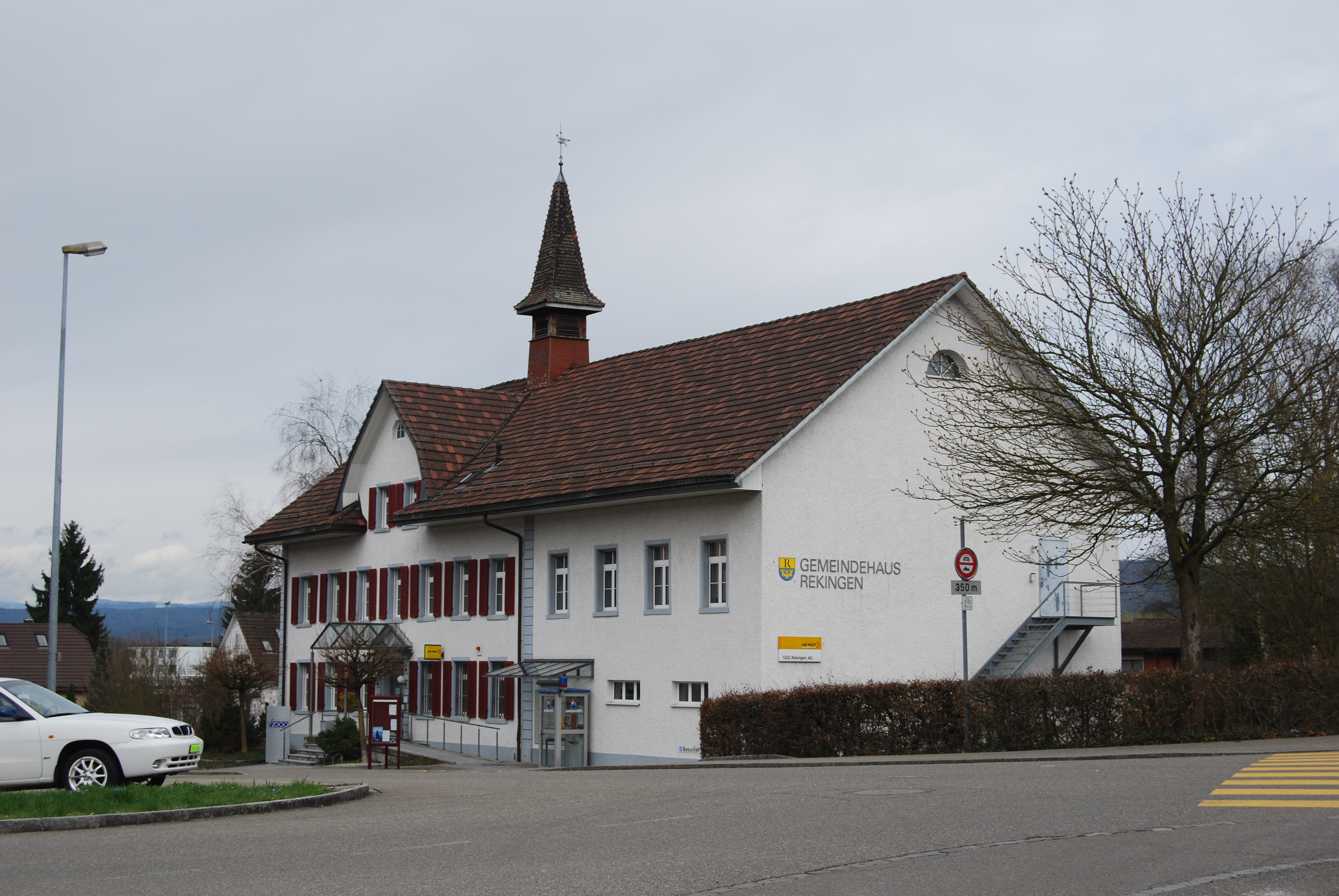
Municipal administration building in Rekingen

Rekingen has a population (as of December 2020) of 969 As of 2008, 37.1% of the population are foreign nationals. Over the last 10 years (1997–2007) the population has changed at a rate of -4.7%. Most of the population (as of 2000) speaks German(84.2%), with Albanian being second most common ( 5.8%) and Italian being third ( 3.8%).

As of 2008, the gender distribution of the population was 50.6% male and 49.4% female. The population was made up of 350 Swiss men (35.9% of the population), and 144 (14.8%) non-Swiss men. There were 371 Swiss women (38.0%), and 111 (11.4%) non-Swiss women. In 2008 there were 2 live births to Swiss citizens and 4 births to non-Swiss citizens, and in same time span there was 1 death of a Swiss citizens. Ignoring immigration and emigration, the population of Swiss citizens increased by 1 while the foreign population increased by 4. There were 2 Swiss men who emigrated from Switzerland to another country, 20 non-Swiss men who emigrated from Switzerland to another country and 12 non-Swiss women who emigrated from Switzerland to another country. The total Swiss population change in 2008 was an increase of 3 and the non-Swiss population change was an increase of 23 people. This represents a population growth rate of 2.7%.

The age distribution, as of 2008, in Rekingen is; 93 children or 9.4% of the population are between 0 and 9 years old and 167 teenagers or 16.9% are between 10 and 19. Of the adult population, 112 people or 11.4% of the population are between 20 and 29 years old. 111 people or 11.3% are between 30 and 39, 186 people or 18.9% are between 40 and 49, and 156 people or 15.8% are between 50 and 59. The senior population distribution is 92 people or 9.3% of the population are between 60 and 69 years old, 40 people or 4.1% are between 70 and 79, there are 24 people or 2.4% who are between 80 and 89, and there are 5 people or 0.5% who are 90 and older.

As of 2000, there were 13 homes with 1 or 2 persons in the household, 155 homes with 3 or 4 persons in the household, and 186 homes with 5 or more persons in the household. As of 2000, there were 362 private households (homes and apartments) in the municipality, and an average of 2.7 persons per household. In 2008 there were 246 single family homes (or 59.4% of the total) out of a total of 414 homes and apartments. There were a total of 12 empty apartments for a 2.9% vacancy rate. As of 2007, the construction rate of new housing units was 2.1 new units per 1000 residents.

In the 2007 federal election the most popular party was the SVP which received 40.63% of the vote. The next three most popular parties were the SP (18.93%), the CVP (17.42%) and the Green Party (9.52%). In the federal election, a total of 249 votes were cast, and the voter turnout was 44.3%.

The historical population is given in the following table:

Historical population
Year	Pop.	±%
1780	259	—
1850	348	+34.4%
1900	270	−22.4%
1950	710	+163.0%
1990	877	+23.5%
2000	998	+13.8%

== Economy ==
As of 2007, Rekingen had an unemployment rate of 1.58%. As of 2005, there were 8 people employed in the primary economic sector and about 2 businesses involved in this sector. 14 people are employed in the secondary sector and there are 5 businesses in this sector. 227 people are employed in the tertiary sector, with 22 businesses in this sector.

In 2000 there were 479 workers who lived in the municipality. Of these, 413 or about 86.2% of the residents worked outside Rekingen while 36 people commuted into the municipality for work. There were a total of 102 jobs (of at least 6 hours per week) in the municipality. Of the working population, 13.5% used public transportation to get to work, and 61.4% used a private car.

== Religion ==
From the 2000 census, 411 or 41.2% were Roman Catholic, while 337 or 33.8% belonged to the Swiss Reformed Church. Of the rest of the population, there were 2 individuals (or about 0.20% of the population) who belonged to the Christian Catholic faith.

== Education ==
In Rekingen about 69.6% of the population (between age 25–64) have completed either non-mandatory upper secondary education or additional higher education (either university or a Fachhochschule). Of the school age population (in the 2008/2009 school year), there are 73 students attending primary school, there are 62 students attending secondary school in the municipality.

== Transport ==
Rekingen AG railway station is served by Zurich S-Bahn line S36, which links Bülach and Waldshut.
