= Zurzach =

- Municipality
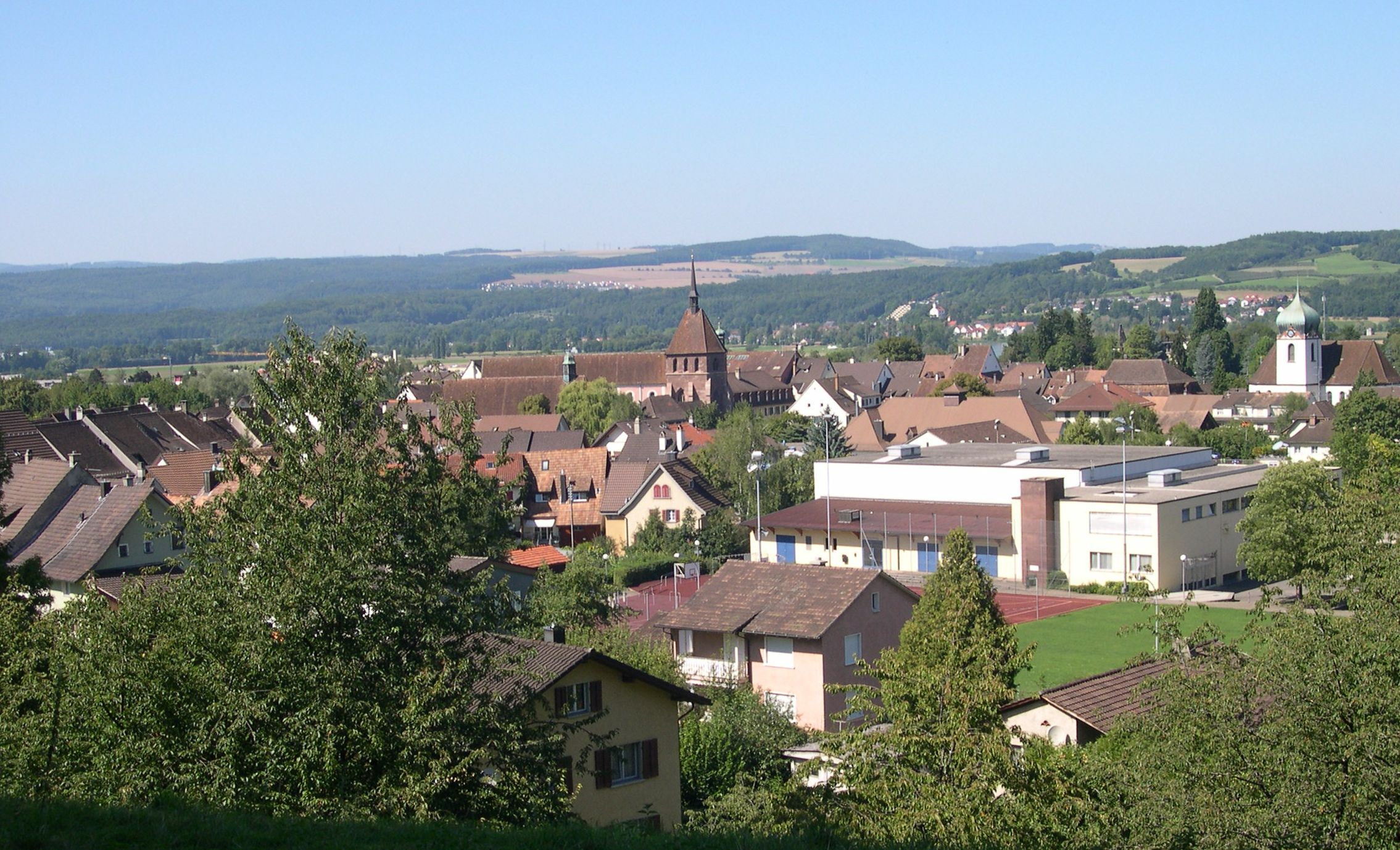
- Bad Zurzach

- Flag Coat of arms
- Location of Zurzach
- Location within Switzerland Location within Canton of Aargau
- Coordinates: 47°36′N 8°18′E
- Country: Switzerland
- Canton: Aargau
- District: Zurzach

Government
  - Mayor: Gemeindeammann; Andi Meier

Area
  - Total: 25.99 km^{2} (10.03 sq mi)
- Elevation: 340 m (1,120 ft)

Population (31 December 2020)
  - Total: 8,476
  - Density: 326.1/km^{2} (844.7/sq mi)
- Time zone: UTC+01:00 (CET)
  - Summer (DST): UTC+02:00 (CEST)
- Postal code: 5330
- SFOS number: 4324
- ISO 3166 code: CH-AG
- Surrounded by: Döttingen, Endingen, Fisibach, Hohentengen am Hochrhein (DE-BW), Klingnau, Koblenz, Küssaberg (DE-BW), Lengnau, Mellikon, Schneisingen, Siglistorf, Tegerfelden, Weiach (ZH)
- Website: www.zurzach.ch/gemeinde

Zurzach (Swiss Standard German pronunciation: [ˈtsʊrtsax]; Alemannic German: Zoorzi, Zuurzi, Zùùrzi) is a municipality in the district of Zurzach in the canton of Aargau in Switzerland. On 1 January 2022 the former municipalities of Bad Zurzach, Baldingen, Böbikon, Kaiserstuhl, Rekingen, Rietheim, Rümikon and Wislikofen merged into the new municipality of Zurzach. It is the seat of the district. Bad Zurzach was previously known as Zurzach.
