= Rümikon =

- Former municipality
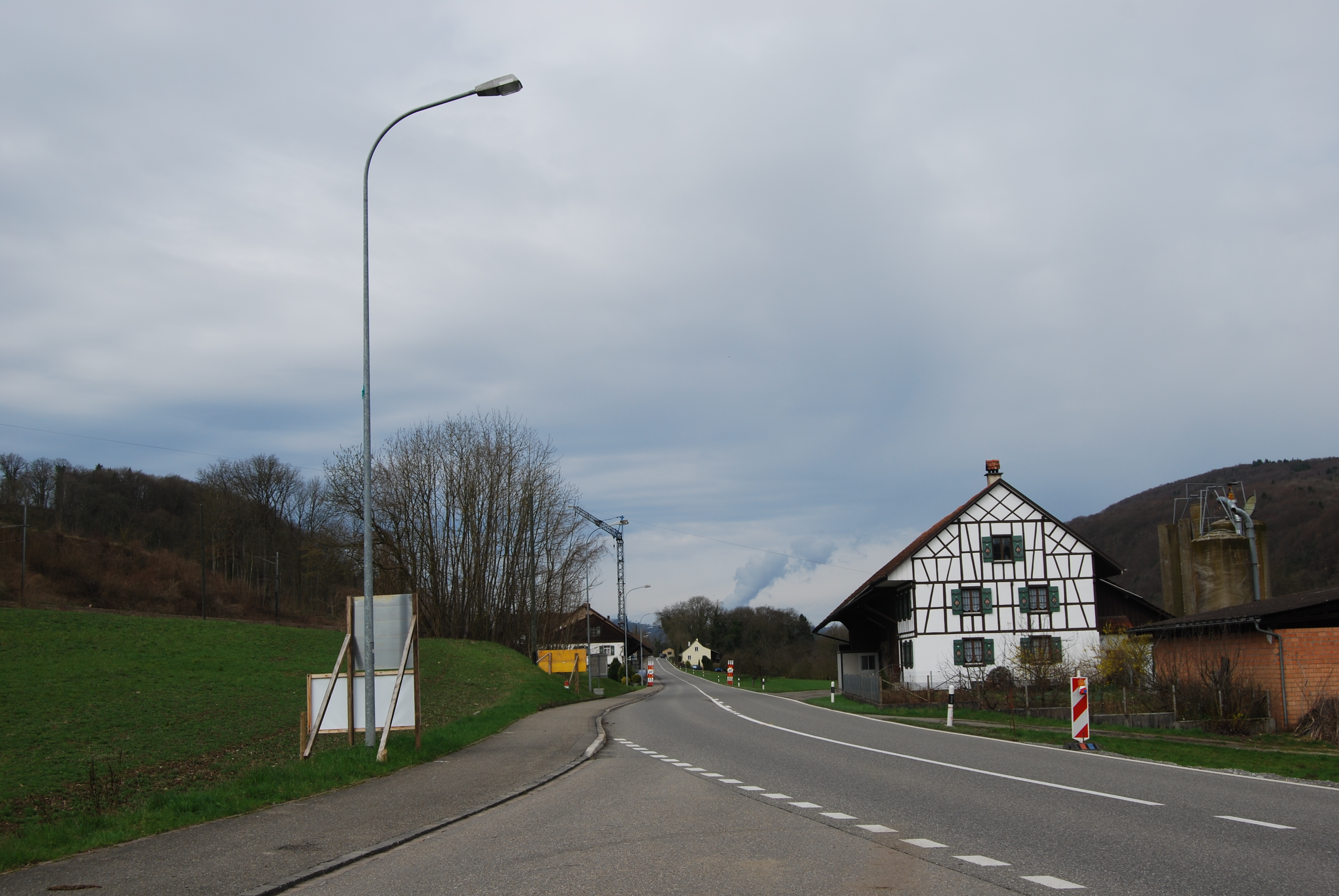

- Flag Coat of arms
- Location of Rümikon
- Location within Switzerland Location within Canton of Aargau
- Coordinates: 47°34′N 8°23′E
- Country: Switzerland
- Canton: Aargau
- District: Zurzach

Area
  - Total: 2.91 km^{2} (1.12 sq mi)
- Elevation: 343 m (1,125 ft)

Population (December 2005)
  - Total: 210
  - Density: 72/km^{2} (190/sq mi)
- Time zone: UTC+01:00 (CET)
  - Summer (DST): UTC+02:00 (CEST)
- Postal code: 5464
- SFOS number: 4317
- ISO 3166 code: CH-AG
- Surrounded by: Fisibach, Hohentengen am Hochrhein (DE-BW), Mellikon, Wislikofen
- Website: www.ruemikon.ch

Rümikon is a village and former municipality in the district of Zurzach in the canton of Aargau in Switzerland. Its late Roman watchtower at the Sandgraben is listed as a heritage site of national significance.

On 1 January 2022 the former municipalities of Bad Zurzach, Baldingen, Böbikon, Kaiserstuhl, Rekingen, Rietheim, Rümikon and Wislikofen merged into the new municipality of Zurzach.

== History ==
Aerial view (1953)

Along the river Rhine, in the municipal area, are the remains of two Roman era watchtowers. The community name may come from an earlier, nearby Alamanni settlement. The modern village of Rümikon is first mentioned in 1113 as Ruminchon. The Freiherr von Waldhausen granted the village to the provost of Wislikofen, who ran the low courts. Between 1415 and 1798 the village went to the district of Ehrendingen in County of Baden.

For centuries the most important industry in the village was fishing. In 1440 John Escher mortgaged the farm Rümikon except for the Fischenz or fishery to four brothers from Rümikon. In 2009, the Fischenz was acquired by the local citizen's community.

Rümikon was part of the parish of Schneisingen until 1857, when it joined the Wislikofen parish. The Anna chapel was built in 1710, renovated in 1797 and renovated again in 1973.

In 2000, about 80% of the workers commuted to jobs outside the municipality. In 1876 the joint Mellikon-Rümikon railway station was built on the Koblenz-Winterthur line. Since 1995 this was replaced with a station in the village.

== Geography ==
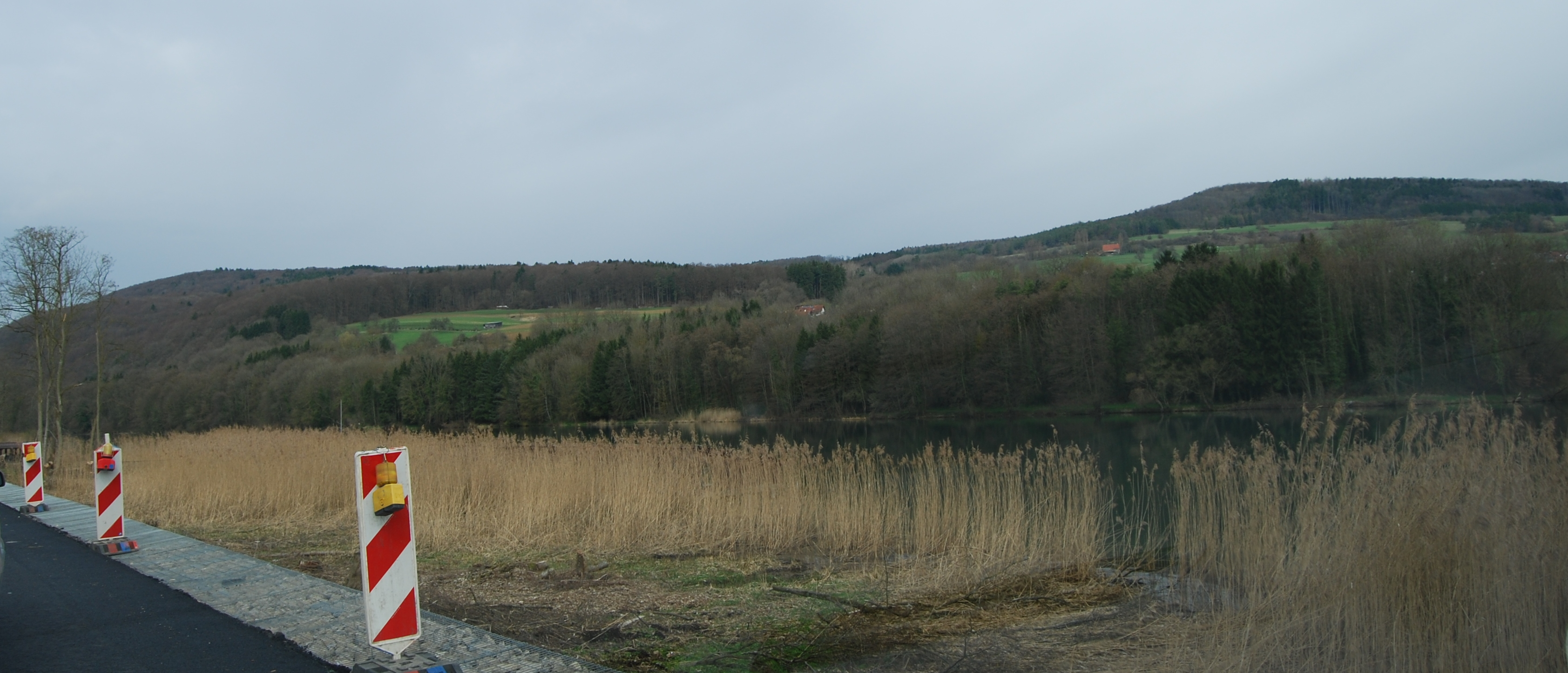
Rhine river from Rümikon

Rümikon has an area, as of 2009, of 2.9 square kilometers (1.1 sq mi). Of this area, 1.19 km^{2} (0.46 sq mi) or 41.0% is used for agricultural purposes, while 1.3 km^{2} (0.50 sq mi) or 44.8% is forested. Of the rest of the land, 0.25 km^{2} (0.097 sq mi) or 8.6% is settled (buildings or roads), 0.19 km^{2} (0.073 sq mi) or 6.6% is either rivers or lakes.

Of the built up area, housing and buildings made up 1.4% and transportation infrastructure made up 6.2%. Out of the forested land, 39.3% of the total land area is heavily forested and 5.5% is covered with orchards or small clusters of trees. Of the agricultural land, 24.1% is used for growing crops and 15.5% is pastures, while 1.4% is used for orchards or vine crops. All the water in the municipality is flowing water.

The village is located in the Zurzach district, between the Rhine river and the Jura Mountains. It consists of the linear village of Rümikon.

== Coat of arms ==
The blazon of the municipal coat of arms is Azure a Salmon Argent between three Mullets of the same one and two.

== Demographics ==
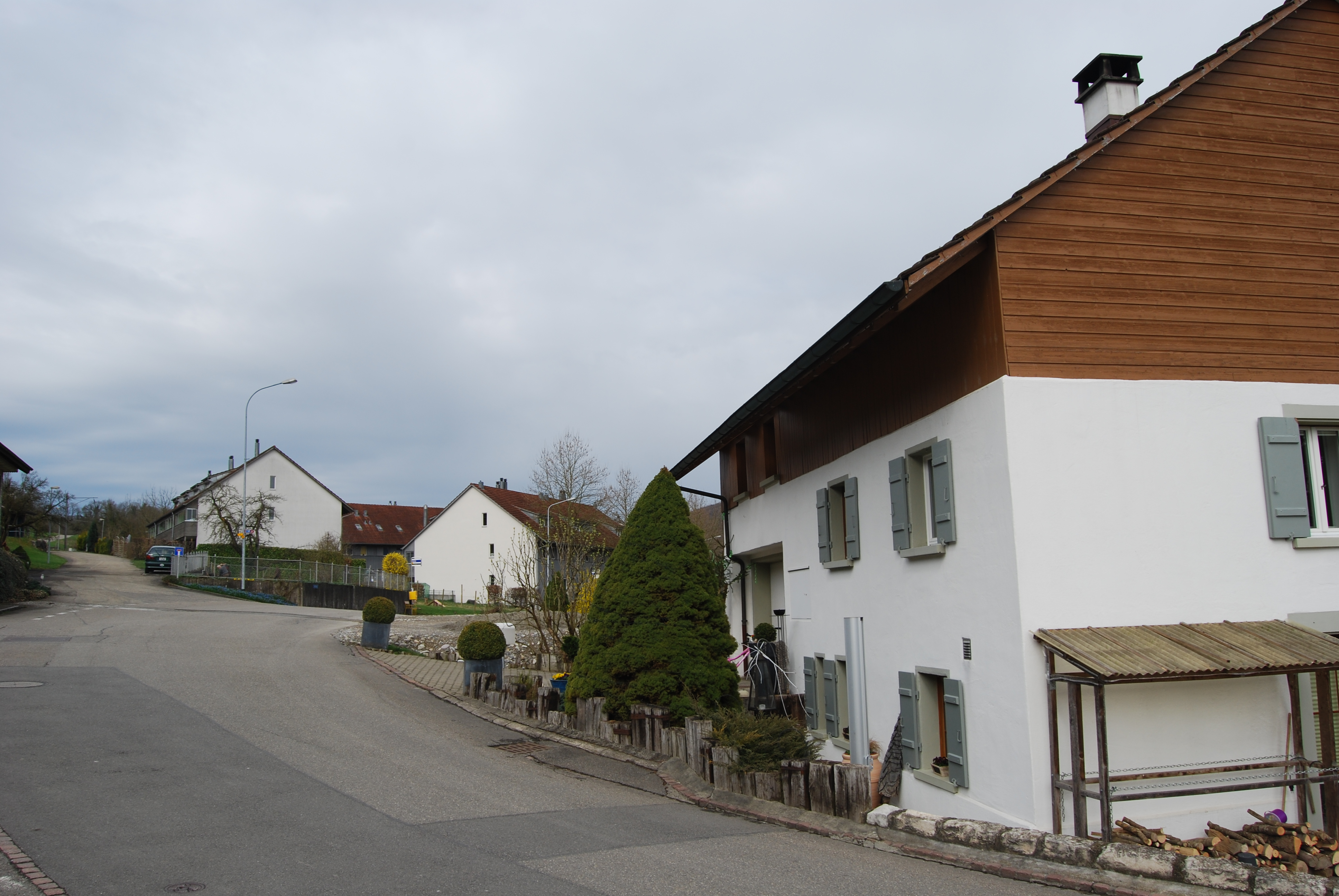
Houses in Rümikon

Rümikon has a population (as of December 2020) of 352 As of 2008, 45.0% of the population are foreign nationals. Over the last 10 years (1997–2007) the population has changed at a rate of -9.7%. Most of the population (as of 2000) speaks German(96.5%), with Turkish being second most common ( 1.3%) and Arabic being third ( 0.9%).

As of 2008, the gender distribution of the population was 47.3% male and 52.7% female. The population was made up of 81 Swiss men (36.8% of the population), and 23 (10.5%) non-Swiss men. There were 100 Swiss women (45.5%), and 16 (7.3%) non-Swiss women. In 2008 there were 4 live births to Swiss citizens and births to non-Swiss citizens, and in same time span there was 1 death of Swiss citizens and non-Swiss citizen deaths. Ignoring immigration and emigration, the population of Swiss citizens increased by 3 while the foreign population remained the same. There was 1 Swiss man who immigrated from another country back to Switzerland, 1 Swiss woman who immigrated from another country back to Switzerland, 8 non-Swiss men who emigrated from Switzerland to another country and 6 non-Swiss women who emigrated from Switzerland to another country. The total Swiss population change in 2008 was an increase of 6 and the non-Swiss population change was an increase of 10 people. This represents a population growth rate of 7.8%.

The age distribution, as of 2008, in Rümikon is; 20 children or 8.8% of the population are between 0 and 9 years old and 27 teenagers or 11.9% are between 10 and 19. Of the adult population, 39 people or 17.2% of the population are between 20 and 29 years old. 19 people or 8.4% are between 30 and 39, 40 people or 17.6% are between 40 and 49, and 37 people or 16.3% are between 50 and 59. The senior population distribution is 26 people or 11.5% of the population are between 60 and 69 years old, 8 people or 3.5% are between 70 and 79, there are 9 people or 4.0% who are between 80 and 89, and there are 2 people or 0.9% who are 90 and older.

As of 2000, there were 8 homes with 1 or 2 persons in the household, 28 homes with 3 or 4 persons in the household, and 50 homes with 5 or more persons in the household. As of 2000, there were 87 private households (homes and apartments) in the municipality, and an average of 2.6 persons per household. In 2008 there were 35 single family homes (or 35.7% of the total) out of a total of 98 homes and apartments. There were a total of 0 empty apartments for a 0.0% vacancy rate. As of 2007, the construction rate of new housing units was 0 new units per 1000 residents.

In the 2007 federal election the most popular party was the SVP which received 41.47% of the vote. The next three most popular parties were the SP (18.33%), the Green Party (15.34%) and the CVP (11.16%). In the federal election, a total of 78 votes were cast, and the voter turnout was 53.4%.

The historical population is given in the following table:

Historical population
Year	Pop.	±%
1850	269	—
1900	199	−26.0%
1950	193	−3.0%
1980	166	−14.0%
1990	201	+21.1%
2000	227	+12.9%

== Heritage sites of national significance ==
The Sandgraben, a portion of the Roman era Rhine fortifications, is listed as a Swiss heritage site of national significance.

== Economy ==
As of 2007, Rümikon had an unemployment rate of 2.62%. As of 2005, there were 11 people employed in the primary economic sector and about 5 businesses involved in this sector. 24 people are employed in the secondary sector and there are 2 businesses in this sector. 32 people are employed in the tertiary sector, with 9 businesses in this sector.

In 2000 there were 121 workers who lived in the municipality. Of these, 98 or about 81.0% of the residents worked outside Rümikon while 55 people commuted into the municipality for work. There were a total of 78 jobs (of at least 6 hours per week) in the municipality. Of the working population, 13.8% used public transportation to get to work, and 64.2% used a private car.

== Religion ==
From the 2000 census, 100 or 44.1% were Roman Catholic, while 76 or 33.5% belonged to the Swiss Reformed Church. Of the rest of the population, there were 4 individuals (or about 1.76% of the population) who belonged to the Christian Catholic faith.

== Education ==
In Rümikon about 76.3% of the population (between age 25-64) have completed either non-mandatory upper secondary education or additional higher education (either university or a Fachhochschule). Of the school age population (in the 2008/2009 school year) in the municipality.

== Transport ==
Rümikon AG railway station is served by Zurich S-Bahn line S36, which links Bülach and Waldshut.
