= Wislikofen =

- Former municipality
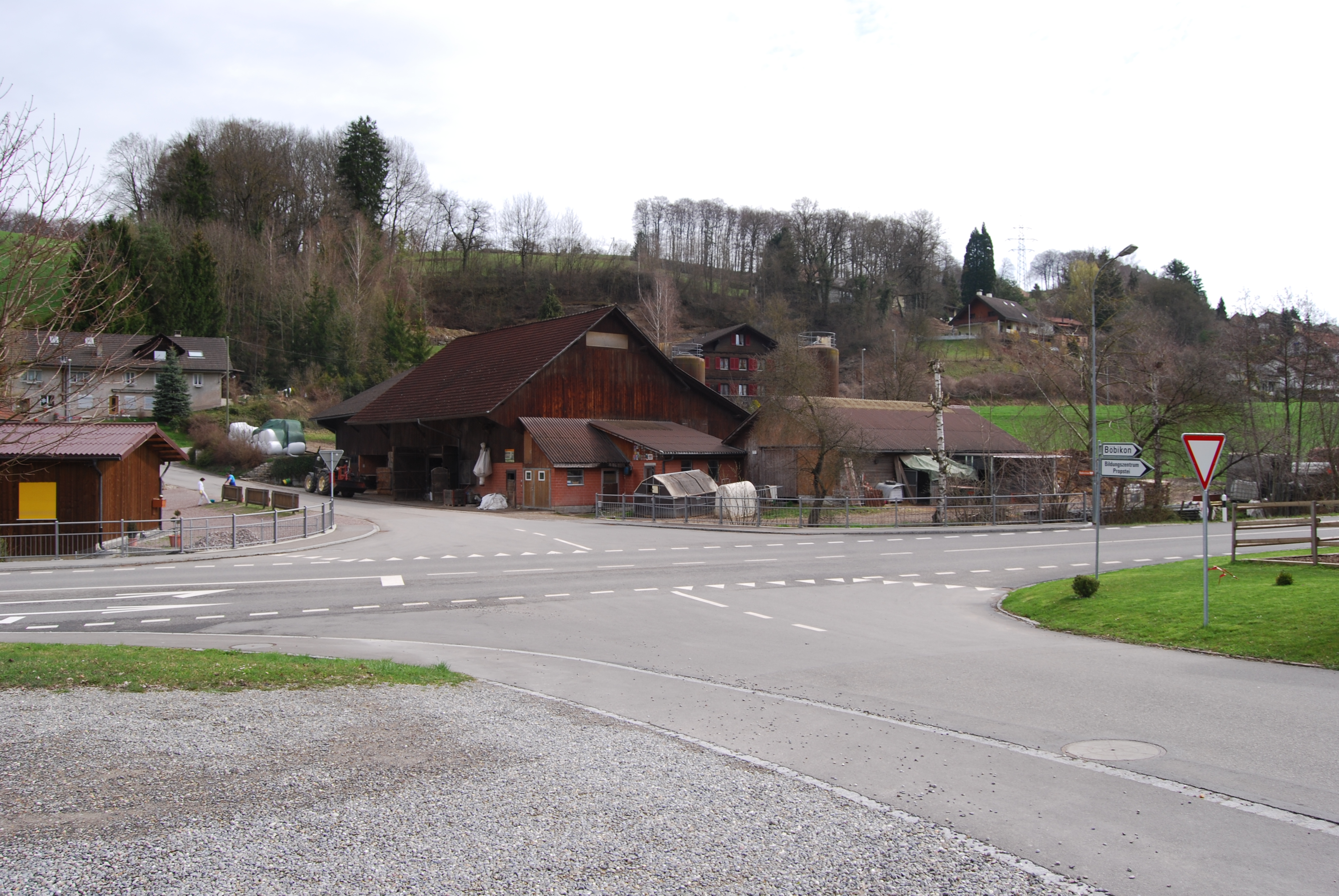
- Wislikofen village

- Flag Coat of arms
- Location of Wislikofen
- Location within Switzerland Location within Canton of Aargau
- Coordinates: 47°34′N 8°22′E
- Country: Switzerland
- Canton: Aargau
- District: Zurzach

Area
  - Total: 3.75 km^{2} (1.45 sq mi)
- Elevation: 394 m (1,293 ft)

Population (December 2005)
  - Total: 336
  - Density: 89.6/km^{2} (232/sq mi)
- Time zone: UTC+01:00 (CET)
  - Summer (DST): UTC+02:00 (CEST)
- Postal code: 5463
- SFOS number: 4322
- ISO 3166 code: CH-AG
- Surrounded by: Böbikon, Fisibach, Lengnau, Mellikon, Rümikon, Schneisingen, Siglistorf
- Website: www.wislikofen.ch

Wislikofen is a village and former municipality in the district of Zurzach in the canton of Aargau in Switzerland. On 1 January 2022 the former municipalities of Bad Zurzach, Baldingen, Böbikon, Kaiserstuhl, Rekingen, Rietheim, Rümikon and Wislikofen merged into the new municipality of Zurzach.

== Geography ==
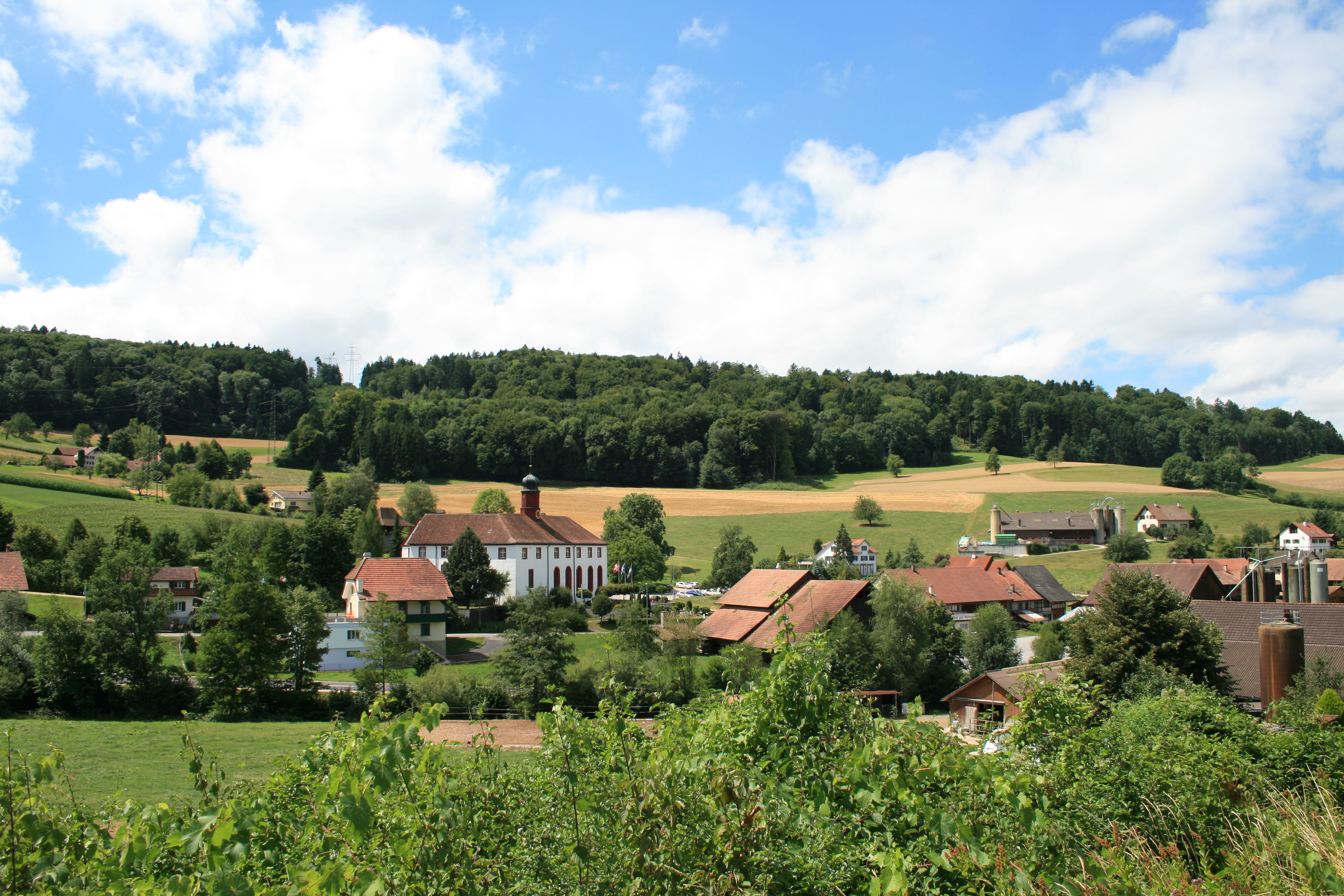
Wislikofen

Wislikofen has an area, as of 2009, of 3.75 square kilometers (1.45 sq mi). Of this area, 2 km^{2} (0.77 sq mi) or 53.3% is used for agricultural purposes, while 1.33 km^{2} (0.51 sq mi) or 35.5% is forested. Of the rest of the land, 0.4 km^{2} (0.15 sq mi) or 10.7% is settled (buildings or roads).

Of the built up area, housing and buildings made up 6.4% and transportation infrastructure made up 4.3%. Out of the forested land, 34.1% of the total land area is heavily forested and 1.3% is covered with orchards or small clusters of trees. Of the agricultural land, 28.5% is used for growing crops and 24.0% is pastures.

== Coat of arms ==
The blazon of the municipal coat of arms is Azure a Lion rampant Argent on a Mount Vert.

== Demographics ==
Wislikofen has a population (as of December 2020) of 353 As of 2008, 46.6% of the population are foreign nationals. Over the last 10 years (1997–2007) the population has changed at a rate of -11.4%. Most of the population (as of 2000) speaks German(98.5%), with English being second most common ( 0.6%) and Italian being third ( 0.3%).

As of 2008, the gender distribution of the population was 50.0% male and 50.0% female. The population was made up of 153 Swiss men (46.6% of the population), and 11 (3.4%) non-Swiss men. There were 150 Swiss women (45.7%), and 14 (4.3%) non-Swiss women. In 2008 there were three live births to Swiss citizens. Ignoring immigration and emigration, the population of Swiss citizens increased by 3 while the foreign population remained the same. There were three non-Swiss men who emigrated from Switzerland to another country and six non-Swiss women who emigrated from Switzerland to another country. The total Swiss population change in 2008 (from all sources) was a decrease of two and the non-Swiss population change was an increase of 3 people. This represents a population growth rate of 0.3%.

The age distribution, as of 2008, in Wislikofen is; 36 children or 11.1% of the population are between 0 and 9 years old and 33 teenagers or 10.2% are between 10 and 19. Of the adult population, 42 people or 12.9% of the population are between 20 and 29 years old. 40 people or 12.3% are between 30 and 39, 44 people or 13.5% are between 40 and 49, and 60 people or 18.5% are between 50 and 59. The senior population distribution is 37 people or 11.4% of the population are between 60 and 69 years old, 17 people or 5.2% are between 70 and 79, there are 14 people or 4.3% who are between 80 and 89, and there are 2 people or 0.6% who are 90 and older.

As of 2000, there were 10 homes with 1 or 2 persons in the household, 35 homes with 3 or 4 persons in the household, and 66 homes with 5 or more persons in the household. As of 2000, there were 113 private households (homes and apartments) in the municipality, and an average of 2.9 persons per household. In 2008 there were 54 single family homes (or 42.9% of the total) out of a total of 126 homes and apartments. There were a total of 1 empty apartments for a 0.8% vacancy rate. As of 2007, the construction rate of new housing units was 0 new units per 1000 residents.

In the 2007 federal election the most popular party was the SVP which received 33.69% of the vote. The next three most popular parties were the CVP (30.53%), the Green Party (15.2%) and the SP (10.16%). In the federal election, a total of 161 votes were cast, and the voter turnout was 63.4%.

The historical population is given in the following table:

Historical population
Year	Pop.	±%
1975	280	—
1980	290	+3.6%
1990	386	+33.1%
2000	346	−10.4%

== Economy ==
As of 2007, Wislikofen had an unemployment rate of 1.86%. As of 2005, there were 54 people employed in the primary economic sector and about 18 businesses involved in this sector. 31 people are employed in the secondary sector and there are 4 businesses in this sector. 60 people are employed in the tertiary sector, with 12 businesses in this sector.

In 2000 there were 180 workers who lived in the municipality. Of these, 124 or about 68.9% of the residents worked outside Wislikofen while 48 people commuted into the municipality for work. There were a total of 104 jobs (of at least 6 hours per week) in the municipality. Of the working population, 10.3% used public transportation to get to work, and 47.8% used a private car.

== Religion ==
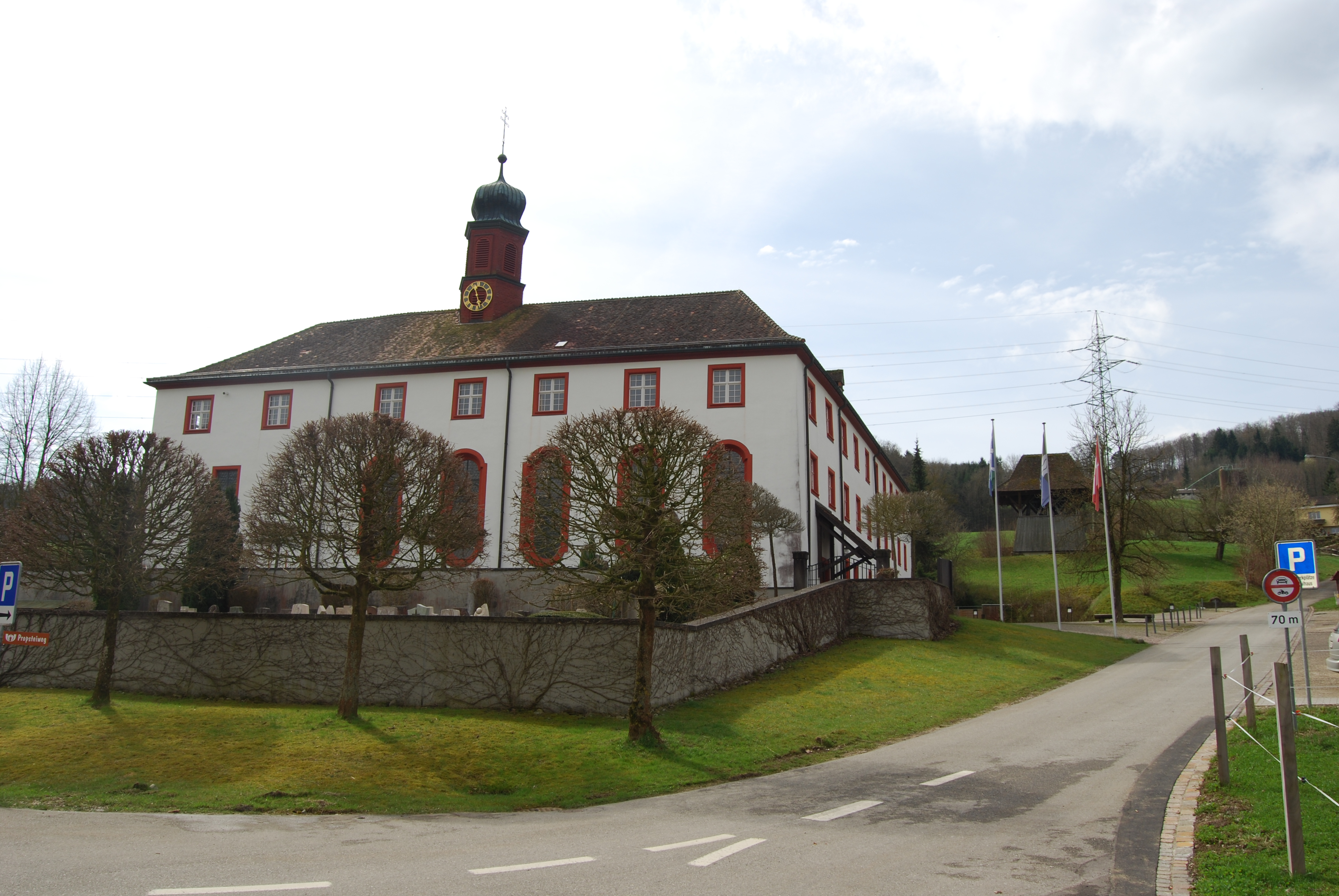
Wislikofen Abbey

From the 2000 census, 223 or 64.8% were Roman Catholic, while 69 or 20.1% belonged to the Swiss Reformed Church.

== Education ==
In Wislikofen about 70.5% of the population (between age 25-64) have completed either non-mandatory upper secondary education or additional higher education (either university or a Fachhochschule). Of the school age population (in the 2008/2009 school year), there are 39 students attending primary school in the municipality.
