= Rietheim, Aargau =

Rietheim
- Former municipality
- Flag Coat of arms
- Location of Rietheim
- Location within Switzerland Location within Canton of Aargau
- Coordinates: 47°36′N 8°17′E
- Country: Switzerland
- Canton: Aargau
- District: Zurzach

Area
  - Total: 3.93 km^{2} (1.52 sq mi)
- Elevation: 331 m (1,086 ft)

Population (December 2005)
  - Total: 677
  - Density: 172/km^{2} (446/sq mi)
- Time zone: UTC+01:00 (CET)
  - Summer (DST): UTC+02:00 (CEST)
- Postal code: 5323
- SFOS number: 4316
- ISO 3166 code: CH-AG
- Surrounded by: Klingnau, Koblenz, Küssaberg (DE-BW), Zurzach
- Website: www.rietheim.ch

Rietheim is a village and former municipality in the district of Zurzach in the canton of Aargau in Switzerland. On 1 January 2022 the former municipalities of Bad Zurzach, Baldingen, Böbikon, Kaiserstuhl, Rekingen, Rietheim, Rümikon and Wislikofen merged into the new municipality of Zurzach.

== History ==
Rietheim is first mentioned in 1239 as Riethein. In the 13th century the noble family of Rietheim is mentioned. The village belonged to the court of Klingnau, which from 1415 until 1798 was under the high court of Baden. The low court right lay with the Bishop of Constance and was exercised by Zurzach Abbey. During the Protestant Reformation the majority of the citizens converted of the new faith.

In 1915 the Swiss Sodafabrik (renamed Solvay in 1922) was awarded a concession for the exploitation of salt in the Rietheimerfeld. The project was abandoned in the early 1960s because of severe land subsidence. Since 1876 it was given a railroad station and connected to the Koblenz-Winterthur line. In 1977 a new schoolhouse was built for the lower grades.

The village was formerly dominated by agriculture and viticulture, but at the beginning of the 21st century, it became a residential and commuter town. Many of Rietheim's various community functions (including finance, education, sanitation) are shared with Zurzach.

== Geography ==
Rietheim has an area, as of 2009, of 3.93 square kilometers (1.52 sq mi). Of this area, 1.83 km^{2} (0.71 sq mi) or 46.6% is used for agricultural purposes, while 1.55 km^{2} (0.60 sq mi) or 39.4% is forested. Of the rest of the land, 0.33 km^{2} (0.13 sq mi) or 8.4% is settled (buildings or roads), 0.19 km^{2} (0.073 sq mi) or 4.8% is either rivers or lakes and 0.03 km^{2} (7.4 acres) or 0.8% is unproductive land.

Of the built up area, housing and buildings made up 2.3% and transportation infrastructure made up 5.3%. Out of the forested land, 37.4% of the total land area is heavily forested and 2.0% is covered with orchards or small clusters of trees. Of the agricultural land, 36.4% is used for growing crops and 9.7% is pastures. All the water in the municipality is flowing water. Of the unproductive areas, and .

The village is located in the Zurzach district, on the north-east edge of the Achenberg. The municipal border stretches to the Rhine river which is the national border. It consists of the haufendorf village (an irregular, unplanned and quite closely packed village, built around a central square) of Rietheim.

== Coat of arms ==
The blazon of the municipal coat of arms is Azure a Ploughshare inverted Argent.

== Demographics ==
Rietheim has a population (as of December 2020) of 726 As of 2008, 34.6% of the population are foreign nationals. Over the last 10 years (1997–2007) the population has changed at a rate of 17.3%. Most of the population (as of 2000) speaks German(86.5%), with Serbo-Croatian being second most common ( 2.8%) and Italian being third ( 2.5%).

As of 2008, the gender distribution of the population was 51.5% male and 48.5% female. The population was made up of 253 Swiss men (35.5% of the population), and 114 (16.0%) non-Swiss men. There were 250 Swiss women (35.1%), and 96 (13.5%) non-Swiss women. In 2008 there was 1 live birth to Swiss citizens and 2 births to non-Swiss citizens, and in same time span there were 2 deaths of Swiss citizens and 1 non-Swiss citizen death. Ignoring immigration and emigration, the population of Swiss citizens decreased by 1 while the foreign population increased by 1. There was 1 Swiss man who emigrated from Switzerland to another country, 1 Swiss woman who emigrated from Switzerland to another country, 4 non-Swiss men who emigrated from Switzerland to another country and 2 non-Swiss women who emigrated from Switzerland to another country. The total Swiss population change in 2008 was an increase of 12 and the non-Swiss population change was an increase of 4 people. This represents a population growth rate of 2.3%.

The age distribution, as of 2008, in Rietheim is; 90 children or 12.4% of the population are between 0 and 9 years old and 116 teenagers or 15.9% are between 10 and 19. Of the adult population, 76 people or 10.4% of the population are between 20 and 29 years old. 75 people or 10.3% are between 30 and 39, 154 people or 21.2% are between 40 and 49, and 112 people or 15.4% are between 50 and 59. The senior population distribution is 59 people or 8.1% of the population are between 60 and 69 years old, 31 people or 4.3% are between 70 and 79, there are 13 people or 1.8% who are between 80 and 89, and there are 2 people or 0.3% who are 90 and older.

As of 2000, there were 12 homes with 1 or 2 persons in the household, 94 homes with 3 or 4 persons in the household, and 89 homes with 5 or more persons in the household. As of 2000, there were 212 private households (homes and apartments) in the municipality, and an average of 2.7 persons per household. In 2008 there were 151 single family homes (or 59.7% of the total) out of a total of 253 homes and apartments. There were a total of 3 empty apartments for a 1.2% vacancy rate. As of 2007, the construction rate of new housing units was 10 new units per 1000 residents.

In the 2007 federal election the most popular party was the SVP which received 42.31% of the vote. The next three most popular parties were the CVP (21.86%), the SP (17.46%) and the FDP (8.6%). In the federal election, a total of 144 votes were cast, and the voter turnout was 39.2%.

The historical population is given in the following table:

Historical population
Year	Pop.	±%
1850	439	—
1900	288	−34.4%
1950	356	+23.6%
1980	425	+19.4%
1990	426	+0.2%
2000	556	+30.5%
2010	728	+30.9%

== Economy ==
As of 2007, Rietheim had an unemployment rate of 2.19%. As of 2005, there were 19 people employed in the primary economic sector and about 8 businesses involved in this sector. 12 people are employed in the secondary sector and there are 5 businesses in this sector. 34 people are employed in the tertiary sector, with 9 businesses in this sector.

In 2000 there were 272 workers who lived in the municipality. Of these, 233 or about 85.7% of the residents worked outside Rietheim while 21 people commuted into the municipality for work. There were a total of 60 jobs (of at least 6 hours per week) in the municipality. Of the working population, 12.1% used public transportation to get to work, and 52.1% used a private car.

== Religion ==
From the 2000 census, 253 or 44.8% were Roman Catholic, while 179 or 31.7% belonged to the Swiss Reformed Church.

== Education ==
In Rietheim about 69.3% of the population (between age 25 and 64) have completed either non-mandatory upper secondary education or additional higher education (either university or a Fachhochschule). Of the school age population (in the 2008/2009 school year), there are 84 students attending primary school in the municipality.

== Transport ==
Rietheim railway station is served by Zurich S-Bahn line S36, which links Bülach and Waldshut, and by alternate trains on Aargau S-Bahn line S27, which link Baden and Bad Zurzach.
