= Jón Laxdal (composer) =

Icelandic composer (1865-1928)

Jón Laxdal (13 October 1865 – 7 July 1928) was an Icelandic composer. The Swedish music historian, Göran Bergendahl (born 1938), includes Laxdal as a minor composing figure in his seminal workon page 26 in contrast to Magnús Einarsson (1848 – 1934). He was noticeable as the co-founder of the Reykjavík Orchestra (Hljómsveit Reykjavíkur) with Sigfús Einarsson. Laxdal's well-known works include two song cycles, Helga in fagra and Gunnar at Hlíðarendi.

He is not to be confused with the Icelandic-Swiss actor, Jón Laxdal (1933 – 2005).

== Legacy ==
The fourth and last song of the 2008 work, Four Songs, by Snorri Sigfús Birgisson, is a variation of a song composed by Laxdal.
