= Kaiserstuhl, Aargau =

Kaiserstuhl
- Former municipality
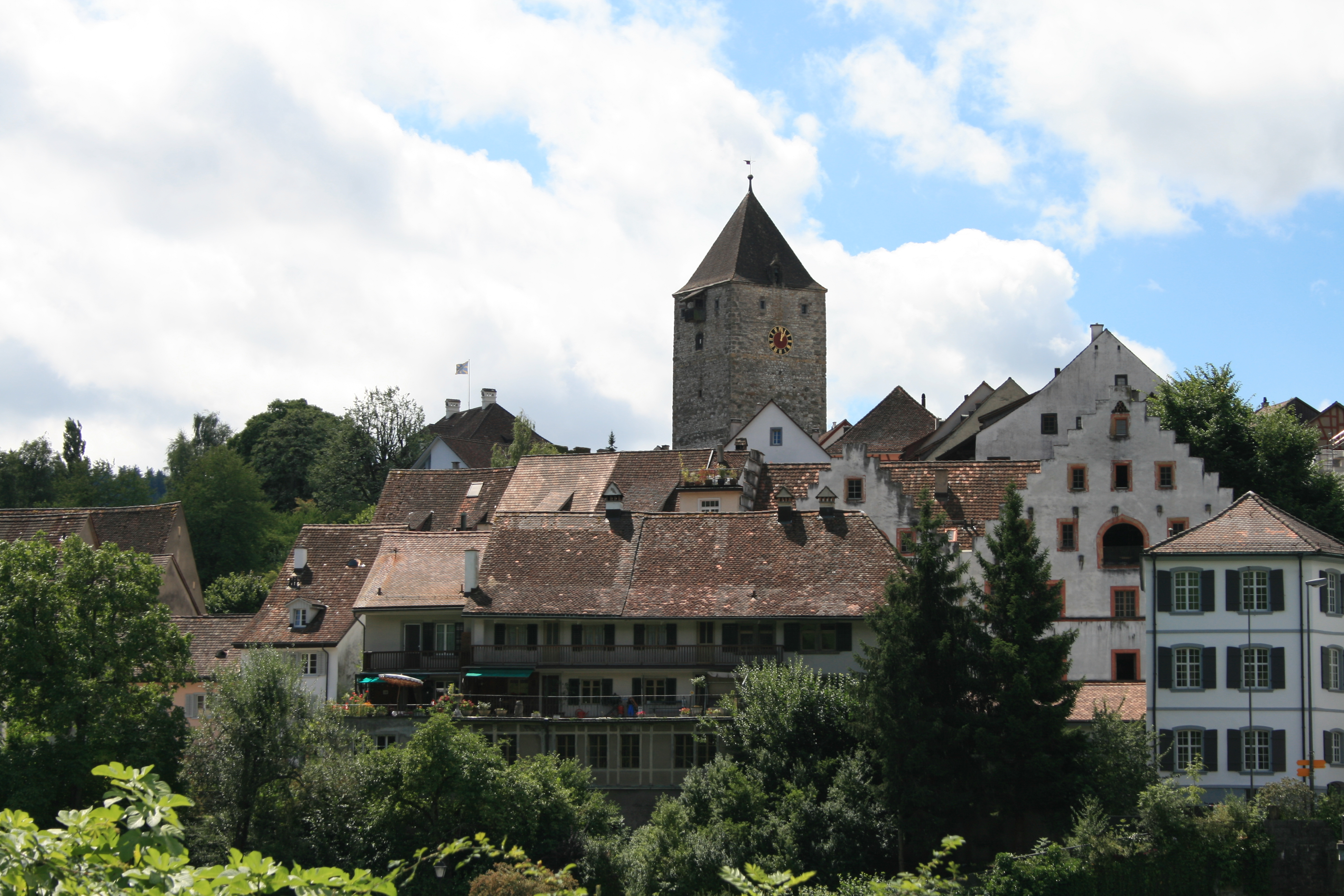

- Flag Coat of arms
- Location of Kaiserstuhl
- Location within Switzerland Location within Canton of Aargau
- Coordinates: 47°34′N 8°25′E
- Country: Switzerland
- Canton: Aargau
- District: Zurzach

Area
  - Total: 0.32 km^{2} (0.12 sq mi)
- Elevation: 347 m (1,138 ft)

Population (December 2005)
  - Total: 420
  - Density: 1,300/km^{2} (3,400/sq mi)
- Time zone: UTC+01:00 (CET)
  - Summer (DST): UTC+02:00 (CEST)
- Postal code: 5466
- SFOS number: 4308
- ISO 3166 code: CH-AG
- Surrounded by: Fisibach, Hohentengen am Hochrhein (DE-BW), Weiach (ZH)
- Website: www.kaiserstuhl.ch

Kaiserstuhl (Swiss Standard German pronunciation: [ˈkaɪzərʃtuːl]) is a village and former municipality in the district of Zurzach in the canton of Aargau in Switzerland. The small town is listed as a heritage site of national significance.

On 1 January 2022 the former municipalities of Bad Zurzach, Baldingen, Böbikon, Kaiserstuhl, Rekingen, Rietheim, Rümikon and Wislikofen merged into the new municipality of Zurzach.

== History ==
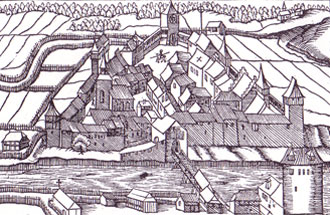
Kaiserstuhl in 1548

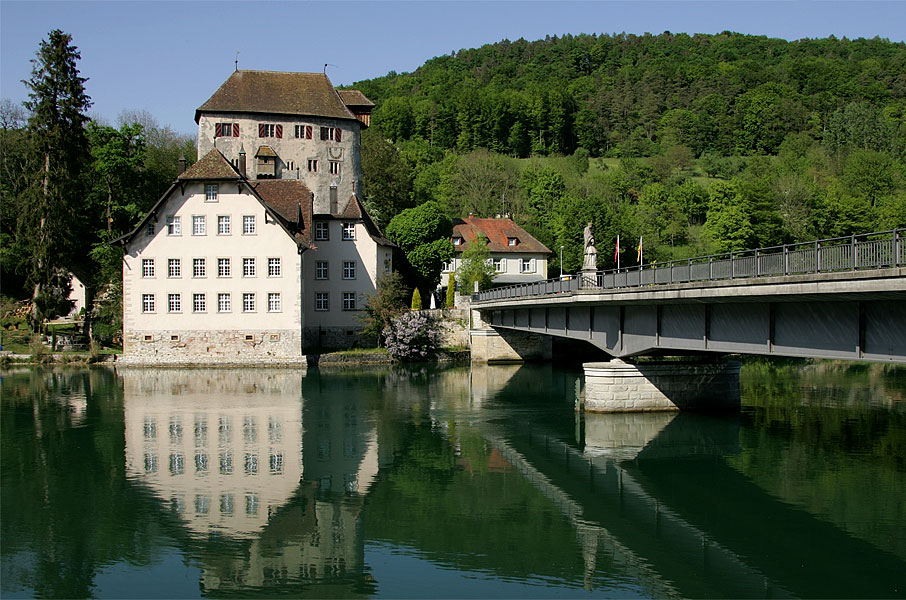
Rotwasserstelz Castle and Rhine Bridge

Kaiserstuhl is first mentioned around 1227–34 as domino Arnoldo de Keiserstul. In 1236 it was mentioned as de Kayserstule. The name and coat of arms come from the Freiherr of Kaiserstuhl, whose castle guarded the right bank of the Rhine. In 1359, the name of the castle changed to Rotwasserstelz Castle. The sale of remote properties lying on both sides of the Rhine to Wettingen Abbey by Rudolf of Kaiserstuhl and his wife Adelheid von Tengen in 1254/55 enabled the expansion of the settlement on left bank of the Rhine. The wall and upper tower (raised to today's height after a fire in 1360) are dated archaeologically to 1260. Construction of the new town also involved the noble Lütold VII von Regensberg, whose descendant, Lütold IX, in mentioned in 1279 as the owner of the city. In 1294 his son sold it with the bridge, castle and other rights in the surrounding villages to Bishop Henry II of Constance. It remained part of the Bishop's holdings until 1798. The Bishop's reeve at Rötelen Castle managed the city and held the low court rights. The independent area of law covered only the area within the city walls, and before the upper gate as well the banks of the Rhine. The left bank territory included fields and gardens, while the area on the right was five times larger and held vineyards and fields for the citizens of the town. The citizenry rights and obligations was first defined in 1310. After 1287, they choose mayors, an eight-member Council and the Court from their midst, which was equal with the episcopal steward, who was almost always an outsider. Further attempts to expand the legal power of the local leaders were rejected in the treaties of 1526, 1535, 1578 and 1687.

In 1365–66 and 1384–85 the town served as a refuge for the Bishop of Constance when he was expelled from the Constance. Before 1324 and between 1371 and 1386 the city was pawned to outside owners as collateral for a loan. From 1359 to 1403 the castle was owned by the locals. In 1374 they were granted an exemption of the war tax. The episcopal rule was weakened by the transition of sovereignty from the Habsburg to the County of Baden in 1415. Due to its location on the religious boundary Kaiserstuhl presented an important bridgehead for the Catholic regions. In both the First War of Villmergen, in 1655/56, and the Toggenburg War (or Second War of Villmergen), in 1712, the village was occupied by Zurich. During the religious conflicts, traffic to Kaiserstuhl was forced to instead cross the Rhine in Zurich controlled areas. As the town did not have the right to tax ship traffic on the Rhine, this loss of land traffic cost the town most of its custom revenue. However, the town remained prosperous due to viticulture and animal husbandry, through the credit and banking, and through foreign service. The prosperity is reflected in the stately houses built during this era. (Gasthaus zur Krone in 1550, administration hall of the monastery of St. Blaise in 1563 and 1612, and the Marschallhaus in 1764). The buildings that allowed Kaiserstuhl to function as a regional center were on the right bank of the Rhine, and were lost in 1798 with the creation of the Canton of Baden. After the destruction of the bridge by the French in 1799 border traffic through Kaiserstuhl ended for almost two decades.

Floods damaged the Rhine Bridge in 1817 and 1876. It was rebuilt in steel and concrete in 1890 and again in 1985. The creation of the post offices in 1816 and the pony express line to Baden, led to prosperity and growth. This culminated in the establishment of the district school in 1836 and a Savings Bank (1837–1916). However, after 1850 the prosperity and growth ended. In 1861 ten houses along Rheingasse were destroyed in a fire, but were never rebuilt. The railway station was opened in 1876 on the railway line Koblenz-Winterthur. The old station was replaced in 1995. Between 1870 and 1911 modern technological infrastructure, including telegraph, telephone and electricity from the power plant Beznau, entered the town. But even with the increased infrastructure, industry hardly settled in Kaiserstuhl. The only industry was textiles, such as an embroidery plant that in 1913 had 33 employees.

== Geography ==
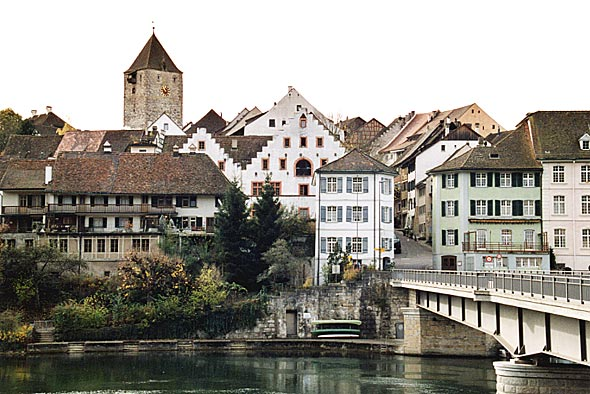
Kaiserstuhl and Rhine River

Aerial view (1953)

Kaiserstuhl has an area, as of 2009, of 0.32 square kilometers (0.12 sq mi). Of this area, 0.11 km^{2} (0.042 sq mi) or 34.4% is used for agricultural purposes, while 0.03 km^{2} (0.012 sq mi) or 9.4% is forested. Of the rest of the land, 0.14 km^{2} (35 acres) or 43.8% is settled (buildings or roads), 0.03 km^{2} (7.4 acres) or 9.4% is either rivers or lakes.

Of the built up area, housing and buildings made up 28.1% and transportation infrastructure made up 12.5%. while parks, green belts and sports fields made up 3.1%. Out of the forested land, 0.0% of the total land area is heavily forested and 9.4% is covered with orchards or small clusters of trees. Of the agricultural land, 9.4% is used for growing crops and 15.6% is pastures, while 9.4% is used for orchards or vine crops. All the water in the municipality is flowing water.

The village municipality is located in the Zurzach district, on the left bank of the Rhine along the border with the Canton of Zürich. It is the site of a bridge over the Rhine to the city of Hohentengen in Baden-Württemberg, Germany.

== Coat of arms ==
The blazon of the municipal coat of arms is Per fess Azure a Pile Gules pointing in base dexter and of the second a Pile of the first pointing in chief dexter.

== Demographics ==
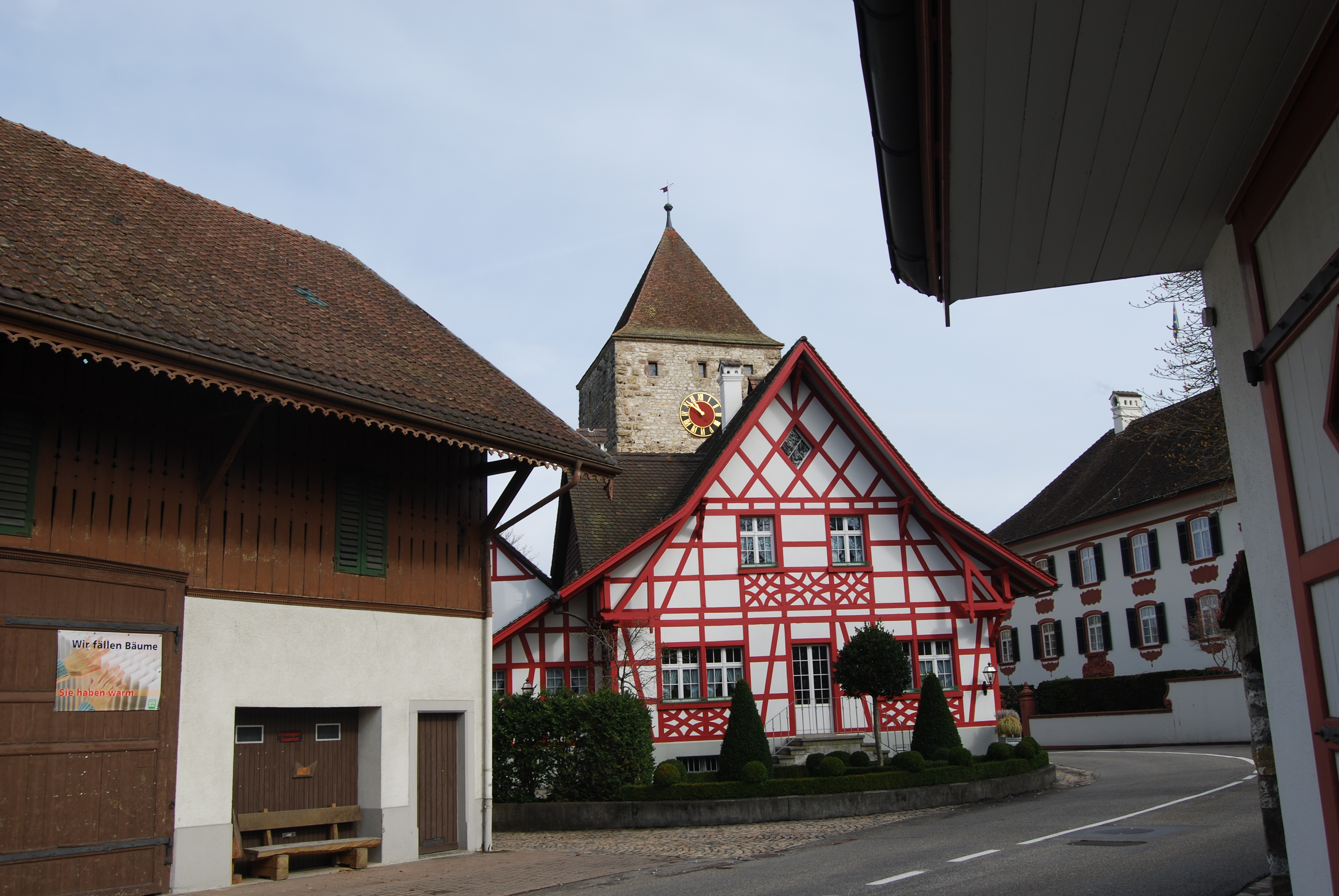
Half-timbered house in Kaiserstuhl

Kaiserstuhl has a population (as of December 2020) of 426 As of June 2009, 18.0% of the population are foreign nationals. Over the last 10 years (1997–2007) the population has changed at a rate of −9.3%. Most of the population (as of 2000) speaks German(85.5%), with Albanian being second most common ( 7.1%) and Italian being third ( 2.3%).

The age distribution, as of 2008, in Kaiserstuhl is; 32 children or 8.1% of the population are between 0 and 9 years old and 47 teenagers or 11.9% are between 10 and 19. Of the adult population, 52 people or 13.2% of the population are between 20 and 29 years old. 46 people or 11.7% are between 30 and 39, 68 people or 17.3% are between 40 and 49, and 65 people or 16.5% are between 50 and 59. The senior population distribution is 45 people or 11.4% of the population are between 60 and 69 years old, 23 people or 5.8% are between 70 and 79, there are 14 people or 3.6% who are between 80 and 89, and there are 2 people or 0.5% who are 90 and older.

As of 2000 the average number of residents per living room was 0.54 which is about equal to the cantonal average of 0.57 per room. In this case, a room is defined as space of a housing unit of at least 4 m^{2} (43 sq ft) as normal bedrooms, dining rooms, living rooms, kitchens and habitable cellars and attics. About 41% of the total households were owner occupied, or in other words did not pay rent (though they may have a mortgage or a rent-to-own agreement).

As of 2000, there were 33 homes with 1 or 2 persons in the household, 87 homes with 3 or 4 persons in the household, and 63 homes with 5 or more persons in the household. As of 2000, there were 185 private households (homes and apartments) in the municipality, and an average of 2.3 persons per household. In 2008 there were 56 single family homes (or 25.7% of the total) out of a total of 218 homes and apartments. There were a total of 4 empty apartments for a 1.8% vacancy rate. As of 2007, the construction rate of new housing units was 0 new units per 1000 residents.

In the 2007 federal election the most popular party was the SVP which received 27.62% of the vote. The next three most popular parties were the SP (21.8%), the CVP (18.02%) and the Green Party (12%). In the federal election, a total of 138 votes were cast, and the voter turnout was 51.7%.

The historical population is given in the following table:

Historical population
Year	Pop.	±%
1837	395	—
1850	448	+13.4%
1870	332	−25.9%
1900	366	+10.2%
1950	408	+11.5%
2000	434	+6.4%

== Heritage sites of national significance ==
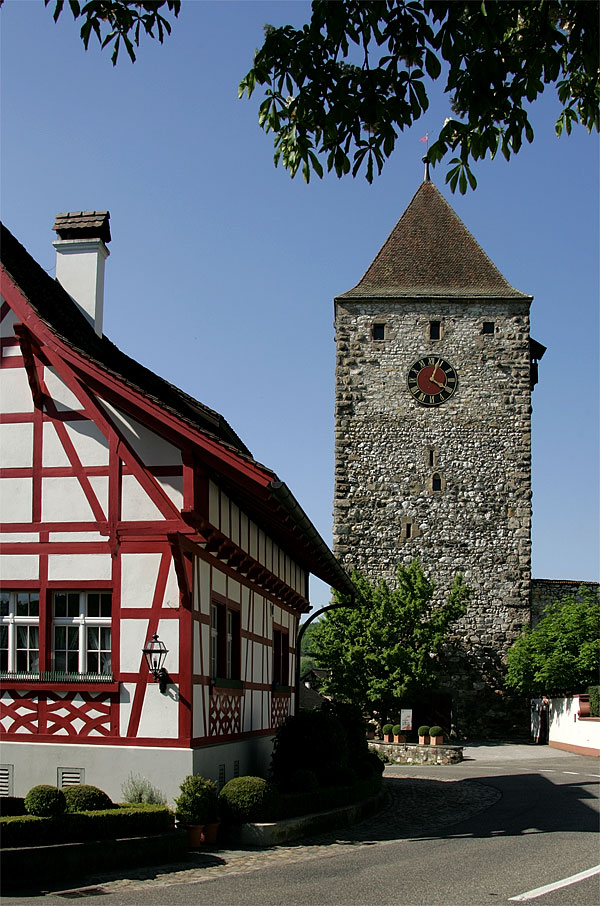
Upper Tower in Kaiserstuhl

The administration building of the former St. Blasien monastery at Hauptstrasse 35, the Mayenfisch- or Marschallhaus at Rheingasse 5, the Upper Tower (German: Oberer Turm) and the city walls are listed as Swiss heritage sites of national significance. The entire village of Kaiserstuhl is designated as part of the Inventory of Swiss Heritage Sites.

== Economy ==
As of 2007, Kaiserstuhl had an unemployment rate of 1.49%. As of 2005, there were 7 people employed in the primary economic sector and about 2 businesses involved in this sector. 9 people are employed in the secondary sector and there are 5 businesses in this sector. 111 people are employed in the tertiary sector, with 24 businesses in this sector. In 2000 there were 245 workers who lived in the municipality. Of these, 190 or about 77.6% of the residents worked outside Kaiserstuhl while 68 people commuted into the municipality for work. There were a total of 123 jobs (of at least 6 hours per week) in the municipality. Of the working population, 16% used public transportation to get to work, and 52.4% used a private car.

== Religion ==
From the 2000 census, 125 or 28.8% were Roman Catholic, while 195 or 44.9% belonged to the Swiss Reformed Church.

== Education ==
The entire Swiss population is generally well educated. In Kaiserstuhl about 74.9% of the population (between age 25–64) have completed either non-mandatory upper secondary education or additional higher education (either university or a Fachhochschule). Of the school age population (in the 2008/2009 school year), there are 54 students attending tertiary or university level schooling in the municipality.

== Transport ==
Kaiserstuhl railway station is served by Zurich S-Bahn line S36, which links Bülach and Waldshut.

== Notable people ==
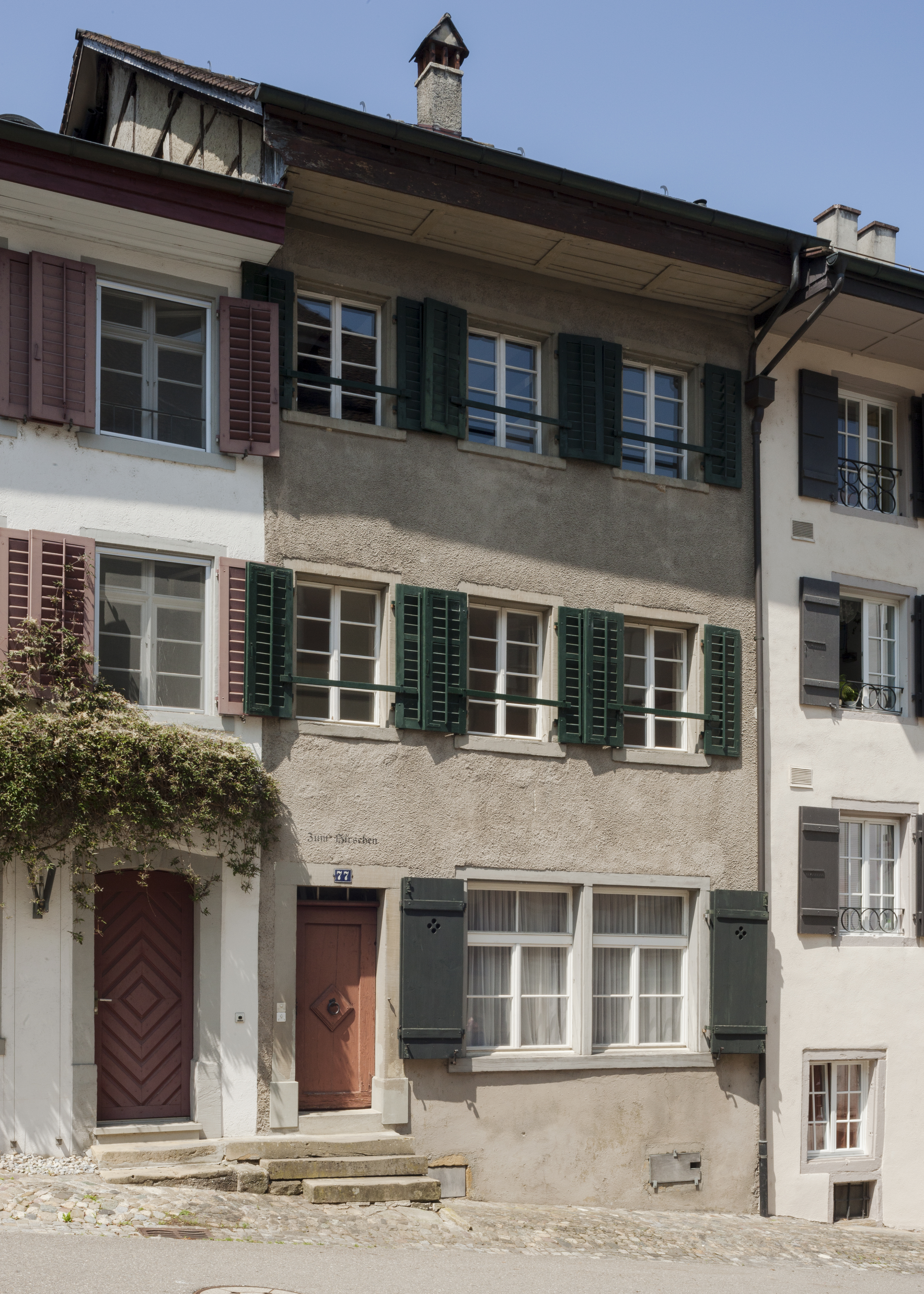
From 1977 to 2019, photographer Eric Bachmann lived and worked in this house, which is labeled "Zum Hirschen" at Hauptgasse 77 in Kaiserstuhl.

- Hermann Suter (1870 in Kaiserstuhl – 1926), Swiss composer and conductor
- Jón Laxdal (1933 – 2005 in Kaiserstuhl), Icelandic-Swiss actor
- Eric Bachmann (1940–2019 in Kaiserstuhl), photographer
