= Böbikon =

- Former municipality
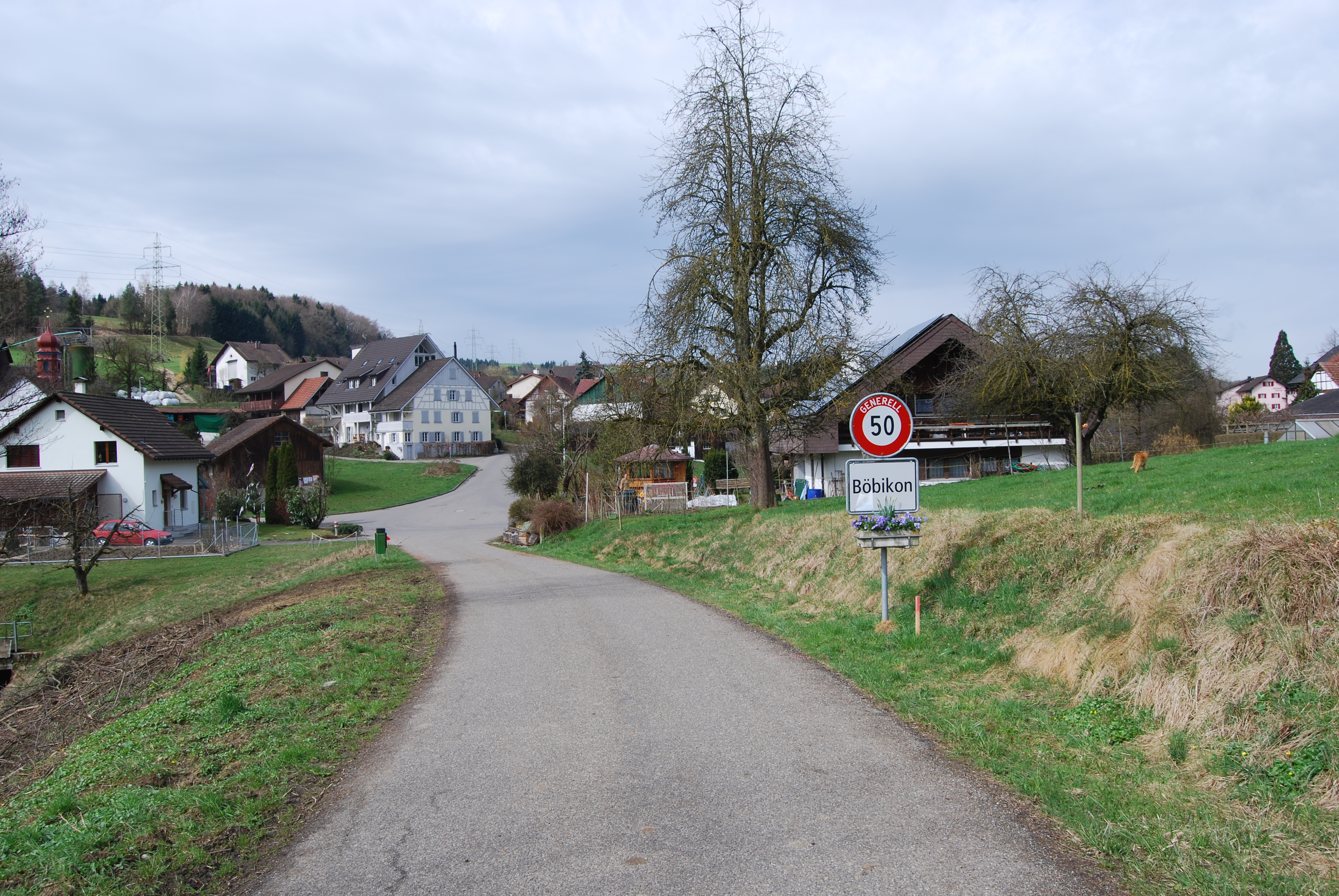

- Flag Coat of arms
- Location of Böbikon
- Location within Switzerland Location within Canton of Aargau
- Coordinates: 47°33′N 8°20′E
- Country: Switzerland
- Canton: Aargau
- District: Zurzach

Area
  - Total: 2.59 km^{2} (1.00 sq mi)
- Elevation: 444 m (1,457 ft)

Population (December 2020)
  - Total: 165
  - Density: 63.7/km^{2} (165/sq mi)
- Time zone: UTC+01:00 (CET)
  - Summer (DST): UTC+02:00 (CEST)
- Postal code: 5334
- SFOS number: 4302
- ISO 3166 code: CH-AG
- Surrounded by: Baldingen, Lengnau, Mellikon, Rekingen, Wislikofen
- Website: www.boebikon.ch

Böbikon is a village and former municipality in the district of Zurzach in Canton Aargau in Switzerland. It is located just 2 km south of the border with Germany.

On 1 January 2022 the former municipalities of Bad Zurzach, Baldingen, Böbikon, Kaiserstuhl, Rekingen, Rietheim, Rümikon and Wislikofen merged into the new municipality of Zurzach.

== History ==
Aerial view from 2000 m by Walter Mittelholzer (1923)

Originally an Alamanni village in a forest clearing, Böbikon is first mentioned in 1113 as Bebikon. West of the village are the ruins of a small village that was inhabited between 1100 and 1250. The major landowners were St. Blaisen Abbey and Zurzach Abbey. The rights to hold courts was held in the 14th and 15th centuries by the Lords of Liebegg. Between 1506 and 1671, the court rights were held by Sion Abbey in Klingnau, and after that those rights were in private hands.

The chapel (now a building from the 18th century), together with tithes were initially the property of St. Blaisen Abbey, while the village was part of the parish of Wislikofen. In 1883 the village and chapel became part of the newly founded parish of Baldingen.

Even at the end of the 20th century, agriculture dominated the economy of the village. In 1990, three-quarters of the jobs in the village were in agriculture.

== Geography ==
Böbikon has an area, as of 2009, of 2.59 square kilometers (1.00 sq mi). Of this area, 1.43 km^{2} (0.55 sq mi) or 55.2% is used for agricultural purposes, while 0.99 km^{2} (0.38 sq mi) or 38.2% is forested. Of the rest of the land, 0.19 km^{2} (0.073 sq mi) or 7.3% is settled (buildings or roads).

Of the built-up area, housing and buildings made up 3.1% and transportation infrastructure made up 4.2%. Out of the forested land, 36.7% of the total land area is heavily forested and 1.5% is covered with orchards or small clusters of trees. Of the agricultural land, 35.5% is used for growing crops and 15.4% is pastures, while 4.2% is used for orchards or vine crops.

The municipality is located in the Zurzach district, in a forested valley between the Surbtal and the Rhine river. The Chrüzlibach stream runs through the village and the valley. Besides the main town of Böbikon, there are two hamlets, each with about a dozen residents. They are Güggehü (about 500 m (1,600 ft) to the north), and Rütihof (about 1,000 m (3,300 ft) to the south-west). The neighboring municipalities are Rekingen in the north west, Mellikon in the north, Wislikofen in the east, Lengnau in the south, and Baldingen in the west.

== Coat of arms ==
The blazon of the municipal coat of arms is Azure a base-semi Mill Wheel Argent and in chief a Mullet Or.

== Demographics ==
Böbikon has a population (as of December 2020) of 165. As of June 2009, 6.0% of the population are foreign nationals. Over the last 10 years (1997–2007) the population has changed at a rate of 1.7%. Most of the population (as of 2000) speaks German (98.9%), with Italian being second most common ( 0.5%) and English being third ( 0.5%).

The age distribution, as of 2008, in Böbikon is; 15 children or 8.7% of the population are between 0 and 9 years old and 22 teenagers or 12.7% are between 10 and 19. Of the adult population, 21 people or 12.1% of the population are between 20 and 29 years old. 10 people or 5.8% are between 30 and 39, 36 people or 20.8% are between 40 and 49, and 28 people or 16.2% are between 50 and 59. The senior population distribution is 20 people or 11.6% of the population are between 60 and 69 years old, 13 people or 7.5% are between 70 and 79, there are 5 people or 2.9% who are between 80 and 89, and there are 3 people or 1.7% who are 90 and older.

As of 2000 the average number of residents per living room was 0.61 which is about equal to the cantonal average of 0.57 per room. In this case, a room is defined as space of a housing unit of at least 4 m^{2} (43 sq ft) as normal bedrooms, dining rooms, living rooms, kitchens and habitable cellars and attics. About 76.7% of the total households were owner occupied, or in other words did not pay rent (though they may have a mortgage or a rent-to-own agreement).

As of 2000, there were 2 homes with 1 or 2 persons in the household, 23 homes with 3 or 4 persons in the household, and 35 homes with 5 or more persons in the household. As of 2000, there were 61 private households (homes and apartments) in the municipality, and an average of 3. persons per household. In 2008 there were 33 single family homes (or 50.0% of the total) out of a total of 66 homes and apartments. There were a total of 2 empty apartments for a 3.0% vacancy rate. As of 2007, the construction rate of new housing units was 0 new units per 1000 residents.

In the 2007 federal election the most popular party was the SVP which received 54.87% of the vote. The next three most popular parties were the CVP (22.78%), the FDP (8.21%) and the Green Party (7.23%). In the federal election, a total of 63 votes were cast, and the voter turnout was 44.4%.

The historical population is given in the following table:

Historical population
Year	Pop.	±%
1799	102	—
1850	269	+163.7%
1900	178	−33.8%
1950	159	−10.7%
1980	119	−25.2%
2000	183	+53.8%

== Economy ==
As of 2007, Böbikon had an unemployment rate of 2.46%. As of 2005, there were 32 people employed in the primary economic sector and about 13 businesses involved in this sector. 12 people are employed in the secondary sector and there are 4 businesses in this sector. 24 people are employed in the tertiary sector, with 6 businesses in this sector.

In 2000 there were 99 workers who lived in the municipality. Of these, 62 or about 62.6% of the residents worked outside Böbikon while 8 people commuted into the municipality for work. There were a total of 45 jobs (of at least 6 hours per week) in the municipality. Of the working population, 5.9% used public transportation to get to work, and 46.1% used a private car.

== Religion ==
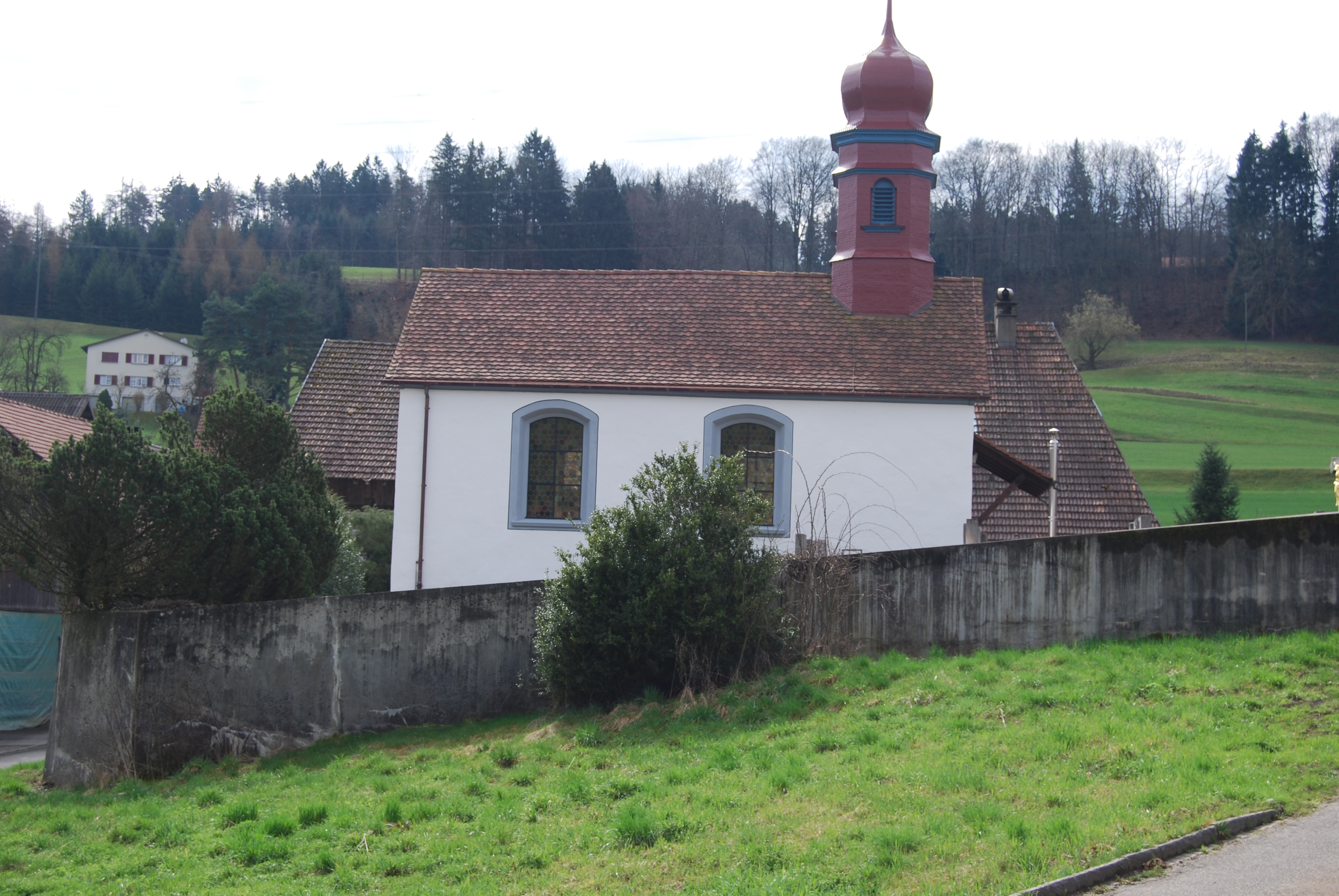
Böbikon church

From the 2000 census, 123 or 67.2% were Roman Catholic, while 42 or 23.0% belonged to the Swiss Reformed Church. Of the rest of the population, there was 1 individual who belonged to the Christian Catholic faith.

== Education ==
The entire Swiss population is generally well educated. In Böbikon about 78.5% of the population (between ages 25 and 64) have completed either non-mandatory upper secondary education or additional higher education (either university or a Fachhochschule). Of the school age population (in the 2008/2009 school year), there are 12 students attending primary school in the municipality.
