= Baldingen, Aargau =

Baldingen
- Former municipality
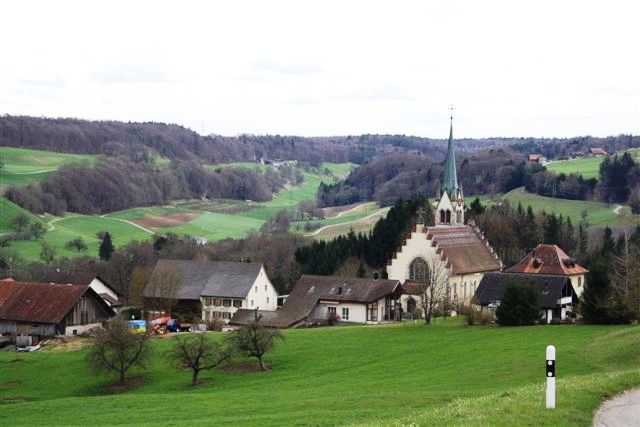

- Flag Coat of arms
- Location of Baldingen
- Location within Switzerland Location within Canton of Aargau
- Coordinates: 47°33′N 8°19′E
- Country: Switzerland
- Canton: Aargau
- District: Zurzach

Area
  - Total: 2.83 km^{2} (1.09 sq mi)
- Elevation: 548 m (1,798 ft)

Population (December 2020)
  - Total: 267
  - Density: 94.3/km^{2} (244/sq mi)
- Time zone: UTC+01:00 (CET)
  - Summer (DST): UTC+02:00 (CEST)
- Postal code: 5333
- SFOS number: 4301
- ISO 3166 code: CH-AG
- Surrounded by: Böbikon, Endingen, Lengnau, Rekingen, Tegerfelden, Unterendingen
- Website: www.baldingen.ch

Baldingen is a village and former municipality in the district of Zurzach in canton of Aargau in Switzerland. It is located only 2 km south of the border with Germany.

On 1 January 2022 the former municipalities of Bad Zurzach, Baldingen, Böbikon, Kaiserstuhl, Rekingen, Rietheim, Rümikon and Wislikofen merged into the new municipality of Zurzach.

== History ==
Baldingen is first mentioned in 1317 as Baldingen, although the area had already been settled by the Alamanni for centuries. During the Middle Ages it was the seat of a minor noble family. Until 1415 it was under the high court of the Habsburgs. After the conquest of the Aargau, it was part of the County of Baden. The court and justice rights were held by a large number of private owners.

Aerial view from 2000 m by Walter Mittelholzer (1923)

It was part of the parish of Zurzach until 1883 when it joined with Böbikon to form their own parish. The parish church of St. Agatha, a Catholic neo-Gothic structure with Art Nouveau elements, was built in 1898 by Charles Moser.

Baldingen's economy was, until very recently, based strongly on agriculture. In 1970 about 54% of the jobs were in agriculture, and by 1990 about one-fourth (23%) of the jobs were still in agriculture. The remaining workforce is almost exclusively commuters, as there are no industrial and commercial enterprises in the village. The population significantly increased after the 1980s, when new single-family houses filled in the gap between the two parts of the village.

== Geography ==
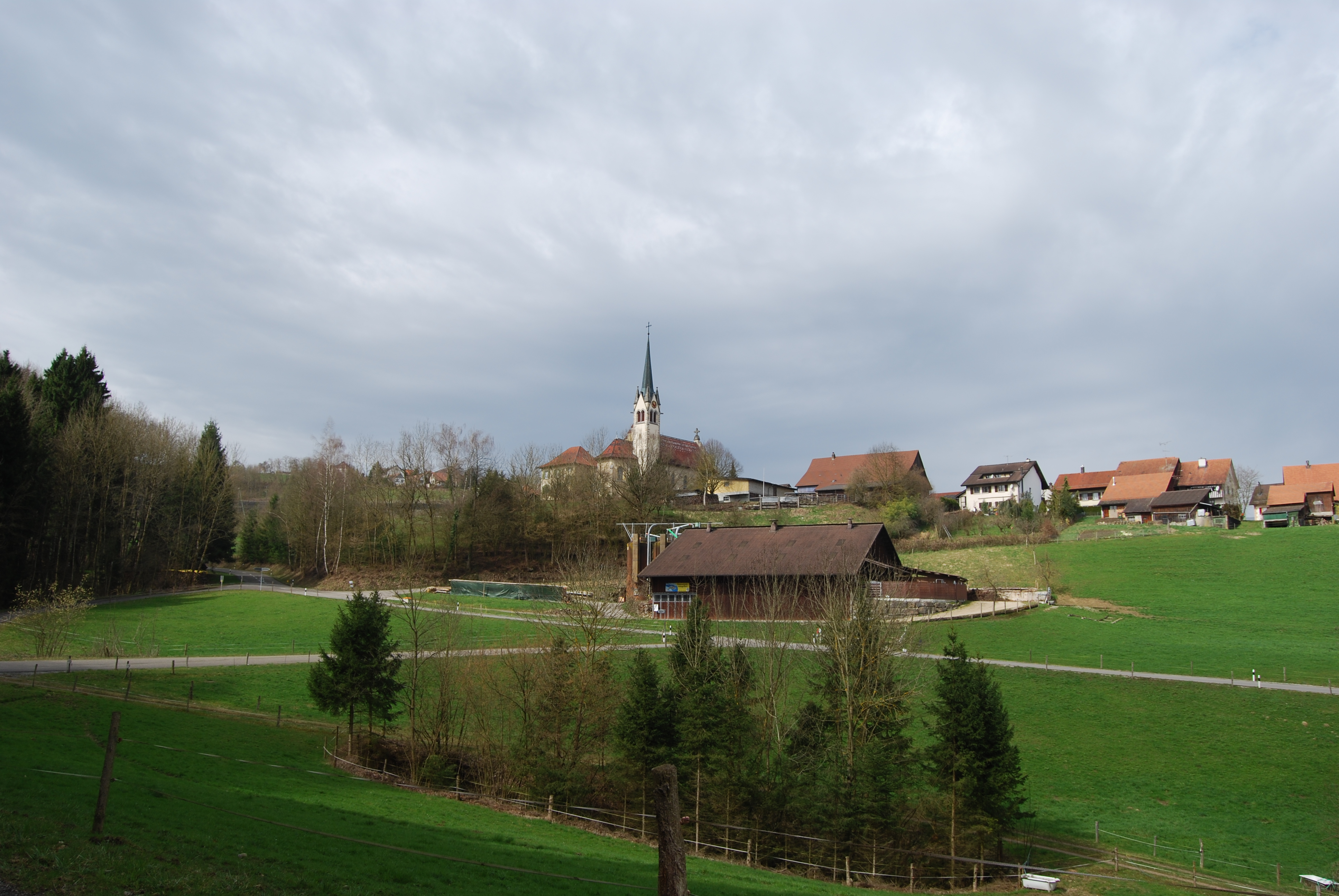
Baldingen village and church

Baldingen has an area, as of 2009, of 2.83 square kilometers (1.09 sq mi). Of this area, 1.61 km^{2} (0.62 sq mi) or 56.9% is used for agricultural purposes, while 0.88 km^{2} (0.34 sq mi) or 31.1% is forested. Of the rest of the land, 0.32 km^{2} (0.12 sq mi) or 11.3% is settled (buildings or roads).

Of the built up area, housing and buildings made up 5.7% and transportation infrastructure made up 5.3%. Out of the forested land, all of the forested land area is covered with heavy forests. Of the agricultural land, 42.8% is used for growing crops and 11.7% is pastures, while 2.5% is used for orchards or vine crops.

The village is formed from two communities: Oberbaldingen (elev. 559 m (1,834 ft)) is located on the crest of Mount Spornegg, a semicircular hill. Unterbaldingen (elev. 460 m (1,510 ft)) lies lower, on the east slope of the hill. The development of the two towns has only recently connected them. The highest point is 583 m (1,913 ft), and the lowest point is 400 m (1,300 ft). Neighboring municipalities are Rekingen to the north, Böbikon to the east, Lengnau to the south-east, Unterendingen to the south, and Tegerfelden to the west.

== Coat of arms ==
The blazon of the municipal coat of arms is Azure three Linden leaves slipped and branched Or.

== Demographics ==
Baldingen has a population (as of December 2020) of 267 As of June 2009, 6.6% of the population are foreign nationals. Over the last 10 years (1997–2007) the population has changed at a rate of 4.6%. Most of the population (as of 2000) speaks German(98.0%), with French being second most common ( 0.8%) and Dutch being third ( 0.4%).

The age distribution, as of 2008, in Baldingen is; 31 children or 10.7% of the population are between 0 and 9 years old and 58 teenagers or 19.9% are between 10 and 19. Of the adult population, 26 people or 8.9% of the population are between 20 and 29 years old. 26 people or 8.9% are between 30 and 39, 75 people or 25.8% are between 40 and 49, and 41 people or 14.1% are between 50 and 59. The senior population distribution is 17 people or 5.8% of the population are between 60 and 69 years old, 8 people or 2.7% are between 70 and 79, there are 8 people or 2.7% who are between 80 and 89, and there is 1 person who is 90 or older.

As of 2000 the average number of residents per living room was 0.6 which is about equal to the cantonal average of 0.57 per room. In this case, a room is defined as space of a housing unit of at least 4 m^{2} (43 sq ft) as normal bedrooms, dining rooms, living rooms, kitchens and habitable cellars and attics. About 81% of the total households were owner occupied, or in other words did not pay rent (though they may have a mortgage or a rent-to-own agreement).

As of 2000, there were 4 homes with 1 or 2 persons in the household, 19 homes with 3 or 4 persons in the household, and 56 homes with 5 or more persons in the household. As of 2000, there were 84 private households (homes and apartments) in the municipality, and an average of 3. persons per household. In 2008 there were 59 single family homes (or 62.1% of the total) out of a total of 95 homes and apartments. There were a total of 1 empty apartments for a 1.1% vacancy rate. As of 2007, the construction rate of new housing units was 7.3 new units per 1000 residents.

In the 2007 federal election the most popular party was the SVP which received 45.45% of the vote. The next three most popular parties were the CVP (20.42%), the SP (10.38%) and the FDP (8.75%). In the federal election, a total of 104 votes were cast, and the voter turnout was 55.0%.

The historical population is given in the following table:

Historical population
Year	Pop.	±%
1799	236	—
1850	336	+42.4%
1900	183	−45.5%
1950	182	−0.5%
1980	144	−20.9%
2000	249	+72.9%

== Economy ==
As of 2007, Baldingen had an unemployment rate of 1.13%. As of 2005, there were 26 people employed in the primary economic sector and about 9 businesses involved in this sector. Nine people are employed in the secondary sector and there are 2 businesses in this sector. Eighteen people are employed in the tertiary sector, with 10 businesses in this sector.

In 2000 there were 116 workers who lived in the municipality. Of these, 89 or about 76.7% of the residents worked outside Baldingen while 7 people commuted into the municipality for work. There were a total of 34 jobs (of at least 6 hours per week) in the municipality. Of the working population, 9.2% used public transportation to get to work, and 55.8% used a private car.

== Religion ==
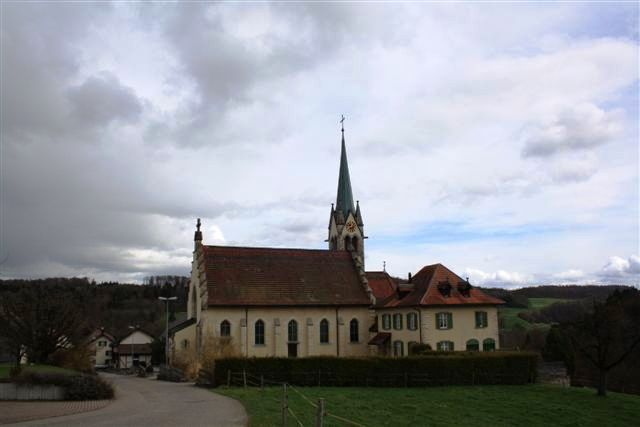
Baldingen church

From the 2000 census, 121 or 48.6% were Roman Catholic, while 75 or 30.1% belonged to the Swiss Reformed Church.

== Education ==
The entire Swiss population is generally well educated. In Baldingen about 76.9% of the population (between age 25–64) have completed either non-mandatory upper secondary education or additional higher education (either university or a Fachhochschule). Of the school age population (in the 2008/2009 school year), there are 33 students attending primary school in the municipality.

== Sights ==
The catholic parish church of St. Agatha in Unterbaldingen was erected in 1898. It was built in the New Gothic and Art Nouveau styles, and was designed by architect Karl Moser, who also designed the Paulus church in Basel.
