= Zurzach District =

Coordinates: 47°35′N 8°17′E

Zurzach District Bezirk Zurzach
- District
- Country: Switzerland
- Canton: Aargau
- Capital: Bad Zurzach

Area
  - Total: 129.99 km^{2} (50.19 sq mi)

Population (2020)
  - Total: 35,041
  - Density: 269.57/km^{2} (698.18/sq mi)
- Time zone: UTC+1 (CET)
  - Summer (DST): UTC+2 (CEST)
- Municipalities: 15

Zurzach District is a district in the Swiss Canton of Aargau. The district capital is Bad Zurzach. It covers the Studenland area and is located in the northeastern part of the canton. It has a population of 35,041 (as of 31 December 2020).

== Geography ==
The Zurzach district has an area, as of 2009, of 129.99 square kilometers (50.19 sq mi). Of this area, 57.08 km^{2} (22.04 sq mi) or 43.9% is used for agricultural purposes, while 51.23 km^{2} (19.78 sq mi) or 39.4% is forested. Of the rest of the land, 16.62 km^{2} (6.42 sq mi) or 12.8% is settled (buildings or roads). The district is situated around the confluence of the Aare and Rhine.

== Demographics ==
The Zurzach district has a population (as of December 2020) of 35,041. As of June 2009, 25.7% of the population are foreign nationals.

== Economy ==
In 2000 there were 15,454 workers who lived in the district. Of these, 11,295 or about 73.1% of the residents worked outside the district while 6,024 people commuted into the district for work. There was a total of 10,183 jobs (of at least 6 hours per week) in the district.

== Religion ==
From the 2000 census, 16,378 or 54.3% were Roman Catholic, while 7,440 or 24.7% belonged to the Swiss Reformed Church. Of the rest of the population, there were 65 individuals (or about 0.22% of the population) who belonged to the Christian Catholic faith.

== Education ==
Of the school age population (in the 2008/2009 school year), there are 2,405 students attending primary school, there are 972 students attending secondary school, there are 756 students attending tertiary or university level schooling in the municipality.

== Municipalities ==
Coat of arms	Municipality	Population (31 December 2020)	Area, km^{2}
Böttstein	Böttstein	3,982	7.41
Döttingen	Döttingen	4,244	6.92
Endingen	Endingen	2,597	11.91
Fisibach	Fisibach	543	5.79
Full-Reuenthal	Full-Reuenthal	883	4.82
Klingnau	Klingnau	3,540	6.71
Koblenz	Koblenz	1,671	4.08
Leibstadt	Leibstadt	1,404	6.39
Lengnau	Lengnau	2,770	12.67
Leuggern	Leuggern	2,180	13.76
Mellikon	Mellikon	228	2.71
Schneisingen	Schneisingen	1,491	8.25
Siglistorf	Siglistorf	669	5.51
Tegerfelden	Tegerfelden	1,202	7.11
Zurzach	Zurzach		25.99
Total		35,041	129.99

=== Mergers ===
The following changes to the district's municipalities have occurred since 2000:

- 1 January 2014: Unterendingen merged into Endingen.
- 1 January 2022: Bad Zurzach, Baldingen, Böbikon, Kaiserstuhl, Rekingen, Rietheim, Rümikon and Wislikofen merged into the new municipality of Zurzach.
