= Jón Laxdal (actor) =

Jón Laxdal Halldórsson
- Born: June 7, 1933; Ísafjörður, Kingdom of Iceland
- Died: May 15, 2005 (aged 71); Kaiserstuhl, Aargau, Switzerland
- Occupations: Actor and director
- Children: 3

Jón Laxdal Halldórsson (7 June 1933, Ísafjörður – 15 May 2005, Kaiserstuhl, Aargau) was an Icelandic-Swiss stage actor. A child of Icelandic fisherman, he later settled in Switzerland and became a member for the Schauspielhaus Zürich, then settled in Kaiserstuhl, Aargau in 1973. He was noticeable playing the leads in the film adaptions of Halldór Laxness' Brekkukotsannáll and Paradísarheimt, and for the localization of the play, Love Letters, by A. R. Gurney.

Laxdal died during the rehearsal for the play, Kleine Eheverbrechen. He was married to Katerina Laxdal until his death.
