= Küssaberg =

- Municipality
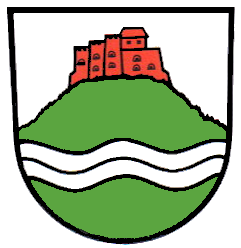
- Coat of arms

- Location of Küssaberg within Waldshut district
- Interactive map of Küssaberg
- Location within Germany Location within Baden-Württemberg
- Coordinates: 47°35′48″N 08°19′12″E
- Country: Germany
- State: Baden-Württemberg
- Admin. region: Freiburg
- District: Waldshut

Government
  - Mayor (2021–29): Manfred Weber

Area
  - Total: 26.17 km^{2} (10.10 sq mi)
- Elevation: 330 m (1,080 ft)

Population (2025-12-31)
  - Total: 5,459
  - Density: 208.6/km^{2} (540.3/sq mi)
- Time zone: UTC+01:00 (CET)
  - Summer (DST): UTC+02:00 (CEST)
- Postal codes: 79790
- Dialling codes: 07741
- Vehicle registration: WT
- Website: www.kuessaberg.de

Küssaberg (German pronunciation: [ˈkʏsabɛʁk]) is a municipality in the district of Waldshut in Baden-Württemberg in Germany.

== Demographics ==
Population development:

Year	Inhabitants
2018	5481
2019	5576
2020	5596
2021	5610
2022	5657
