= Sulzer =

Sulzer may refer to:

== People ==
- Alain Claude Sulzer (born 1953), Swiss writer and translator
- Alexander Sulzer (born 1984), German ice hockey player
- Charles August Sulzer, delegate to the United States House of Representatives from the Territory of Alaska
- David Sulzer (born 1956), American neuroscientist
- Joe Sulzer, US politician
- Johann Sulzer (disambiguation)
- Julius Sulzer (1830–1891), Austrian composer and conductor, son of Salomon
- Salomon Sulzer (1804–1890), Austrian cantor, synagogal music composer
- Simon Sulzer (1508–1585) Swiss theologian
- William Sulzer (1863–1941), a Governor of New York

== Places ==
- 16505 Sulzer, a main-belt asteroid
- Conrad Sulzer Regional Library, Chicago
- Sulzer, Alaska, a former settlement on Prince of Wales Island, which serviced a nearby copper mine operated by Charles and William Sulzer

== Businesses ==
- Sulzer (manufacturer), a Swiss industrial engineering and manufacturing business

== See also ==
- Sulz (disambiguation)
