= Surbtal =

Valley in Aargau, Switzerland

Coordinates: 47°32′N 8°17′E

Surbtal is a river valley region in the Canton of Aargau, Switzerland.

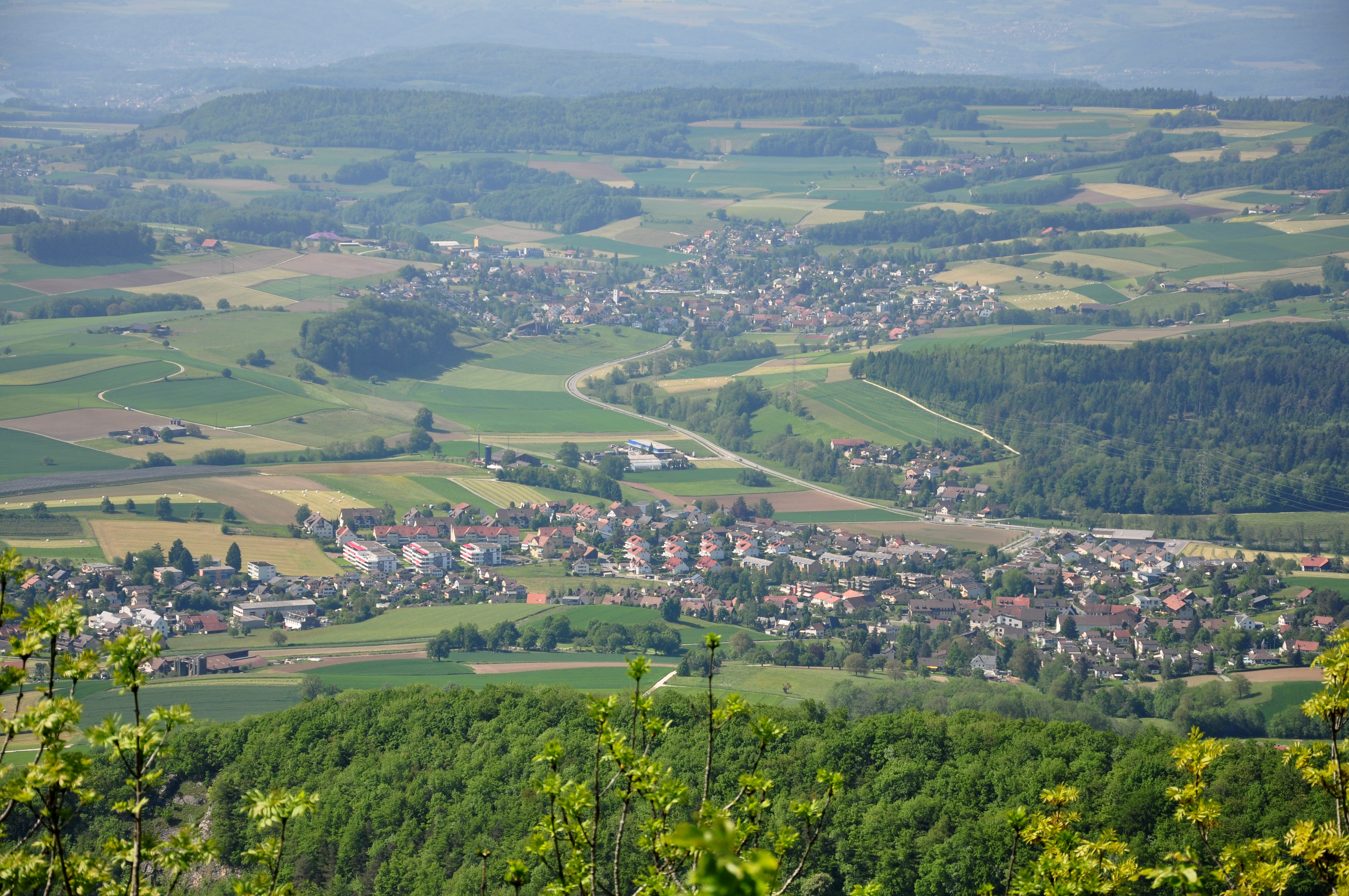
Surbtal (Surb valley) at Lengnau as seen from the Lägern chain

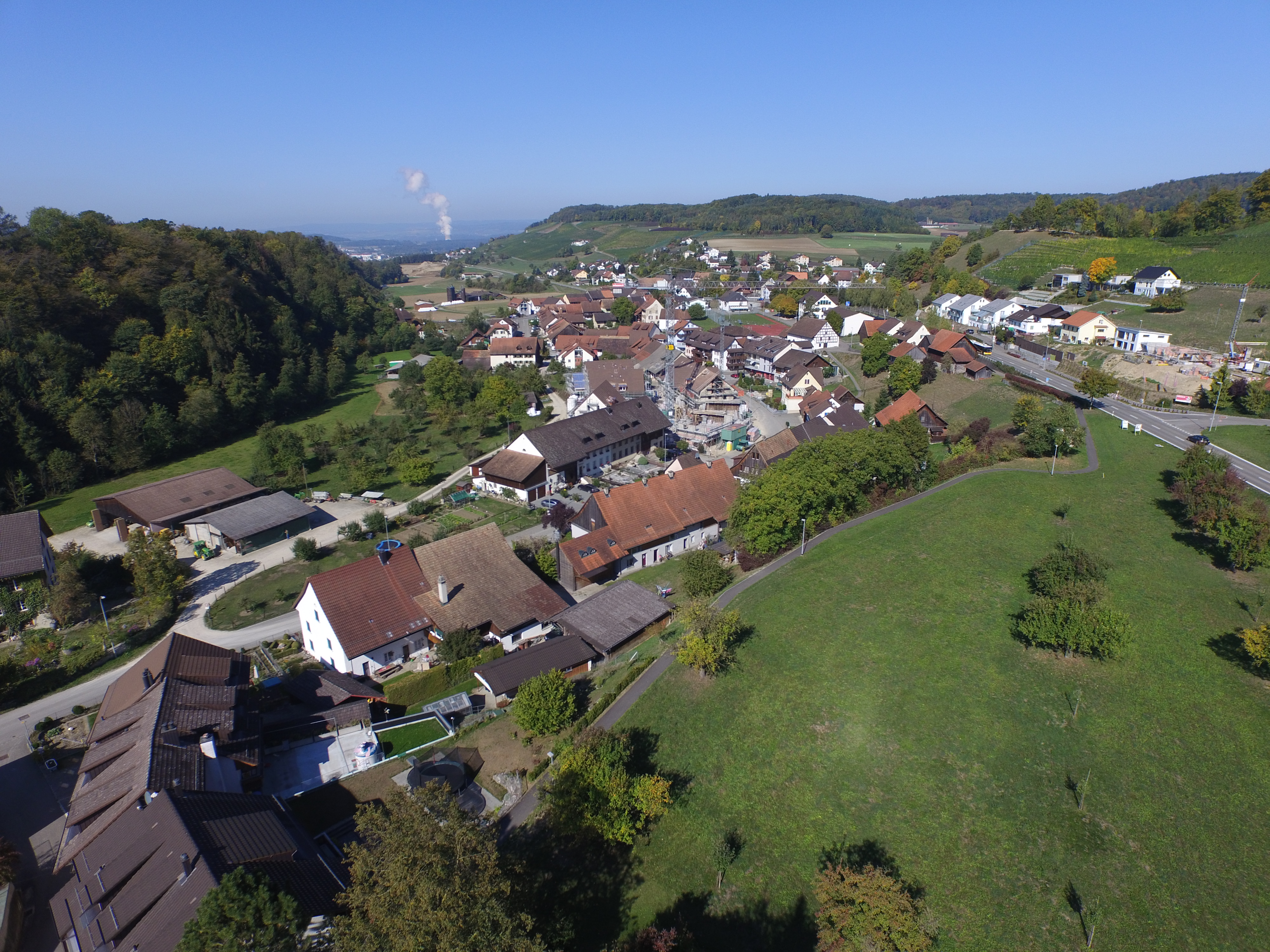
Tegerfelden towards Leibstadt

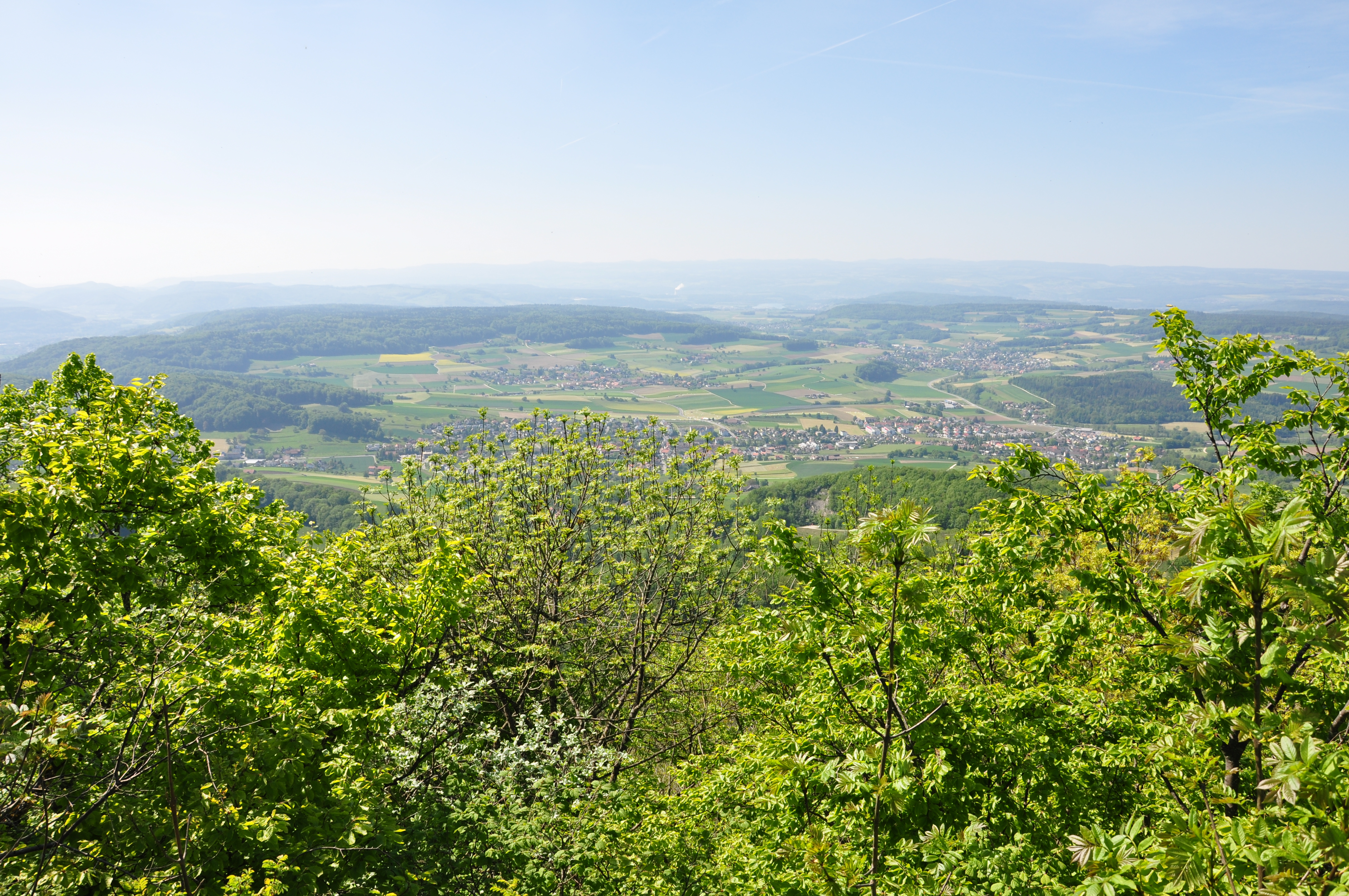
Ehrendingen and Lengnau towards Leibstadt

== Geography ==
The Surbtal (literally Surb valley) is situated parallel to the Limmat Valley (Limmattal) in the Baden and Zurzach districts of the Canton of Aargau in Switzerland. The valley is bounded by moraines of the Linth glacier; and in the east it passes over to the border of the Canton of Zürich respectively the drainage basin of the Wehn Valley (native German name: Wehntal).

Surbtal comprises the area of the municipalities:

- Döttingen
- Endingen
- Ehrendingen
- Freienwil
- Lengnau
- Schneisingen
- Tegerfelden

== Surb ==
The Surb is a 20 kilometres (12.4 mi) long river in the Swiss cantons of Aargau and Zürich, where she rises on an altitude of 471 metres (1,545 ft) MAMSL at the municipality of Schöfflisdorf. The river drains the northern Wehntal, passing the municipalities of Ehrendingen, Lengnau, Endingen, Unterendingen and Tegerfelden in the Surbtal. South of the village center of Döttingen, the Surb joins the Aare.

== History ==
About 185,000 years ago, a side lobe of the Walensee/Reinglacier overlapped on the threshold at the present Pfannenstiel eastern slope from Hombrechtikon into the Glatttal towards Niederweningen, and eroded the overdeepened rock rut of the present Wehntal area. After another glacial maximum about 140,000 years ago, the ice melted in the last Eemian (interglacial) period back far into the alpine valleys, and great lakes with border union fens filled the former glacial basin. Following the Würm glaciation, during the last glacial maximum about 24,000 years ago, the glaciers pushed again to the lower Glatt Valley. With the increasing warming period about 20,000 years ago, the glaciers melted away in stages to Zürich, later Hurden and formed the Seedamm at the Obersee lake shore respectively the Ufenau, Lützelau and Heilig Hüsli islands on Zürichsee, and finally the glaciers retreated into the alpine mountains.

The oldest settlement findings date back to the Neolithic period. From Roman times there are finds at various locations, including a villa rustica in Lengnau. In the Early and High Middle Ages the monasteries of St. Gallen and Einsiedeln had possessions in the Surbtal, later particularly the St. Blasien Abbey.

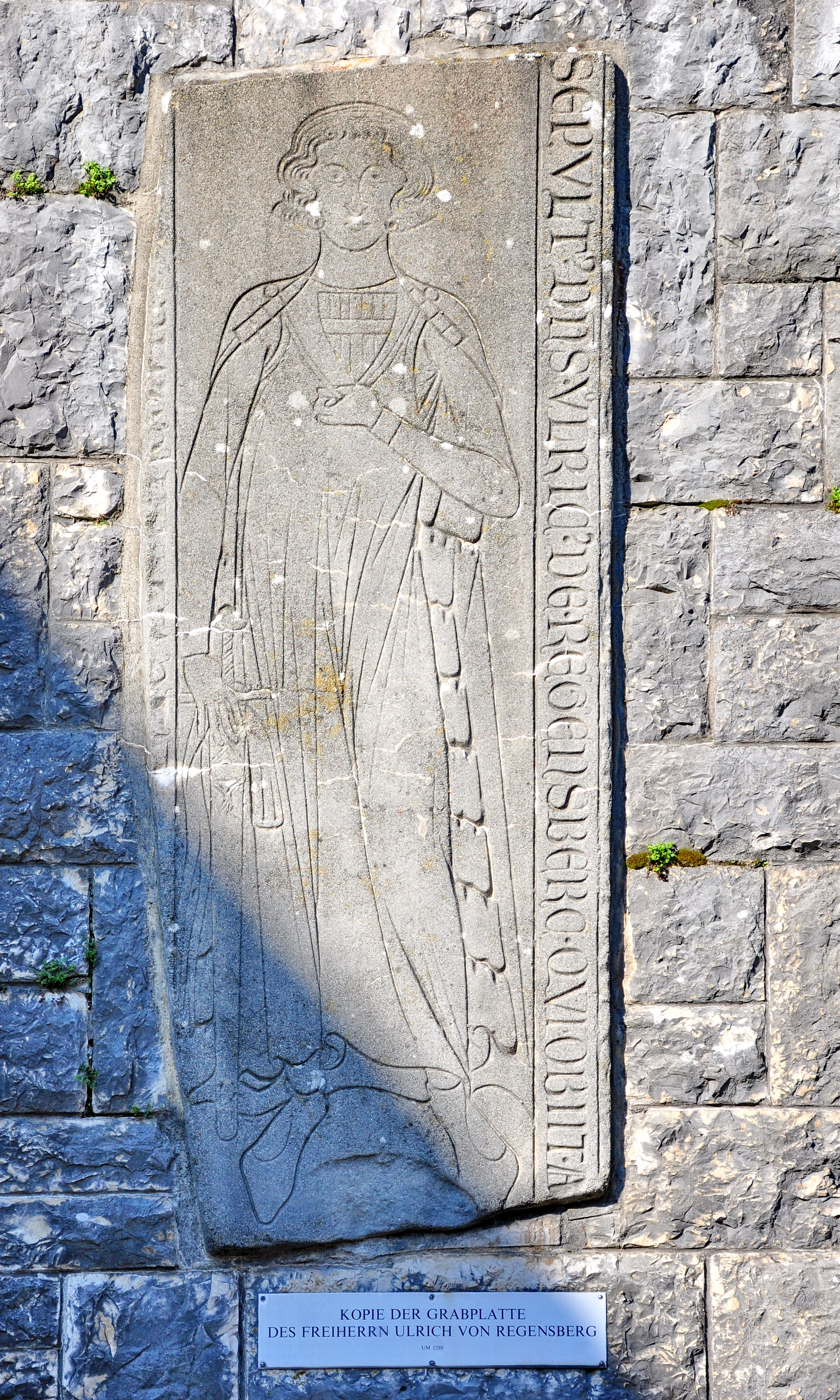
replic of the gravestone of Ulrich I von Regensberg at the Regensberg Castle

The heartland of the possessions of the medieval House of Regensberg was in the Furt and Wehn valleys besides the Lägern chain, where around 1050 AD the family built its ancestral seat Altburg near Zürich-Affoltern, and two centuries later Neu-Regensberg on the eastern Lägern slope. In the 13th century the upper Surbtal (Lengnau) was controlled by the Counts of Regensberg, the lower valley by the families von Tegerfelden and later von Klingen. In 1269 Walther von Klingen sold his rights along with the town of Klingnau to the Bishop of Constance. The Regensberg family was ousted by the Habsburg family and the city of Zürich in the second half of the 13th century. In 1415 the valley came, as part of the Grafschaft Baden (bailiwicks of Siggen and Ehrendingen), to the Old Swiss Confederancy. In 1528, during the Reformation in Zürich, Niederweningen remained Roman Catholic; in Endingen, Tegerfelden and Unterendingen still lived Reformed minorities. In 1803 the Surbtal came as part of the county of Baden to the present Canton of Aargau.

== Surbtaler Juden ==
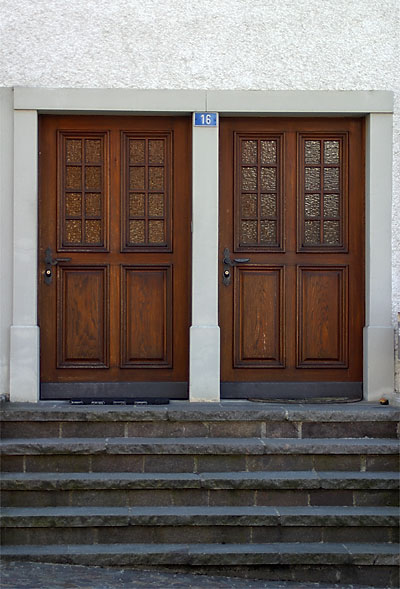
Two separate doors (one for Jews and one for Christians) on a house in Endingen

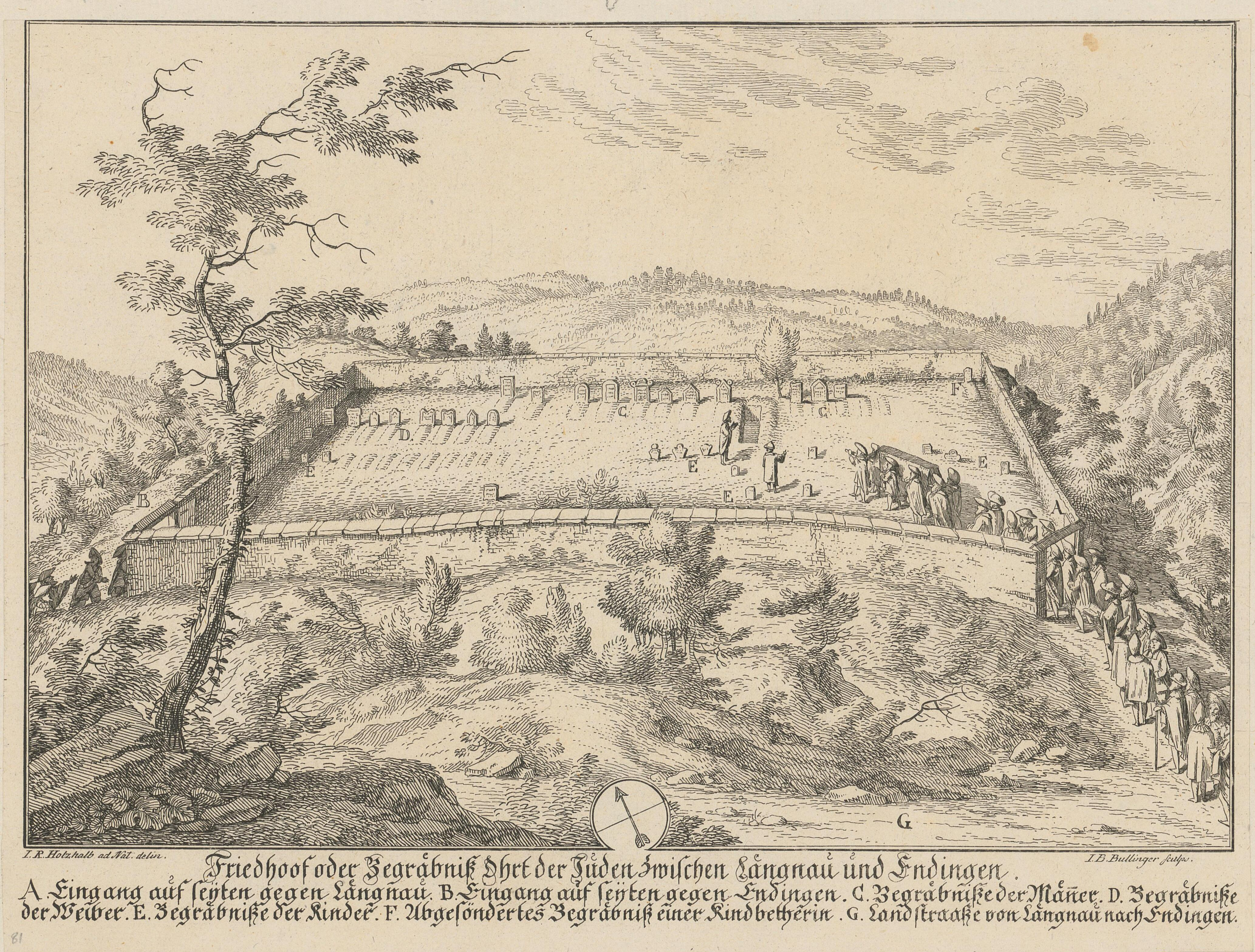
1754 drawing of the Endingen cemetery by Johann Caspar Ulrich

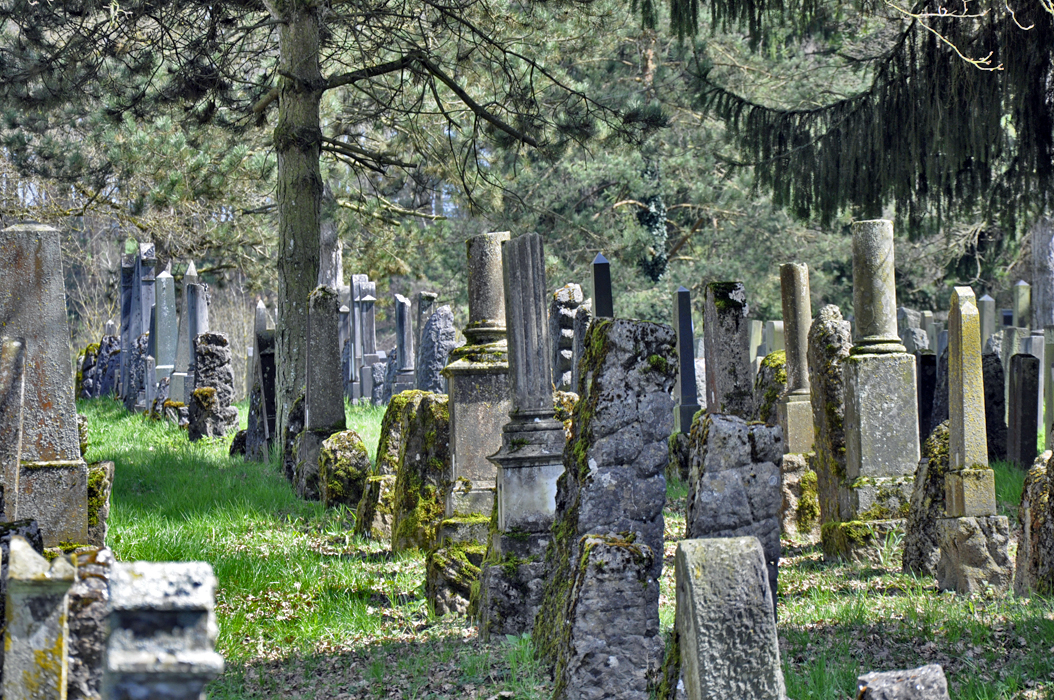
Jewish cemetery in Endingen

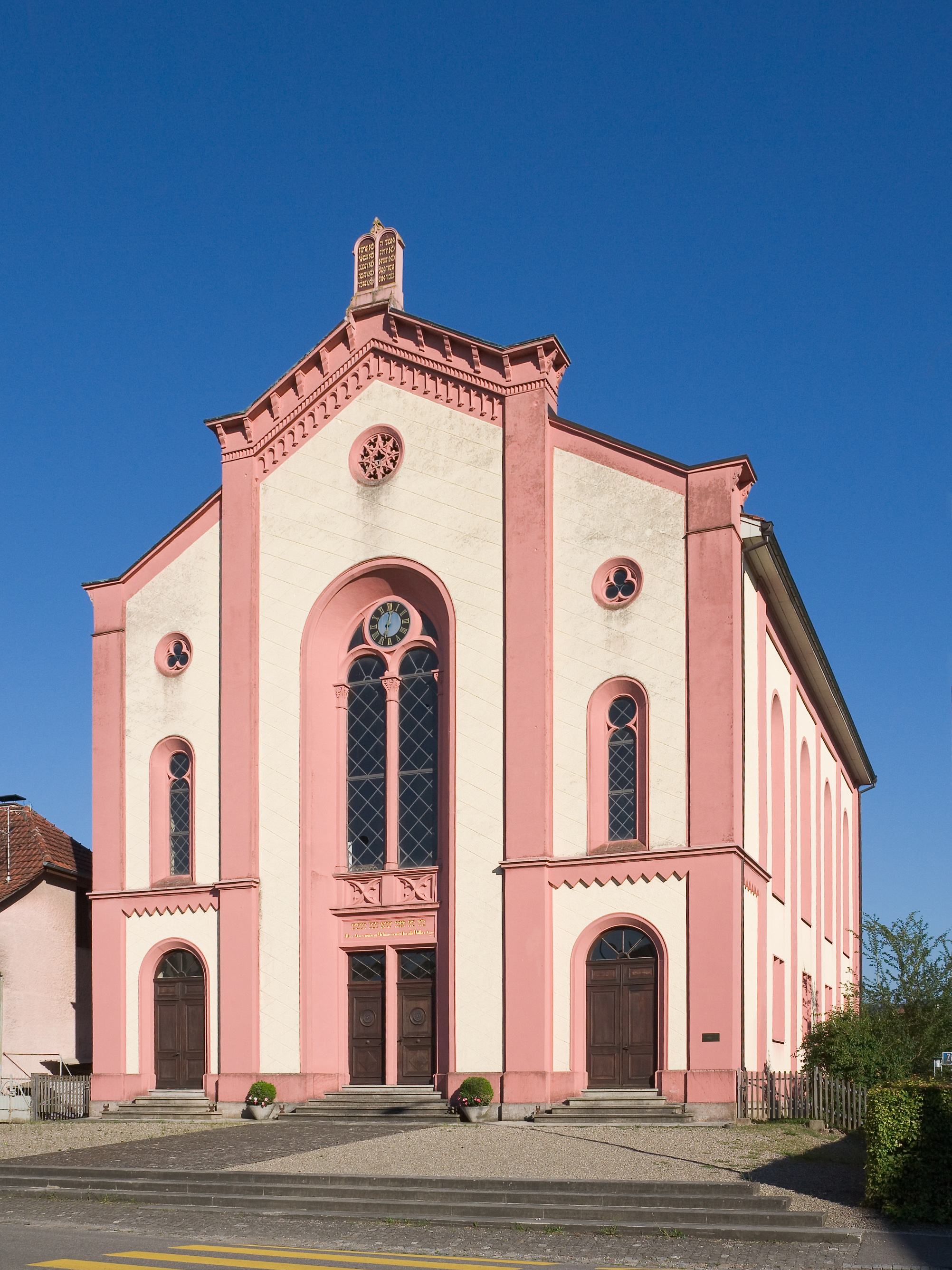
Synagoge in Lengnau

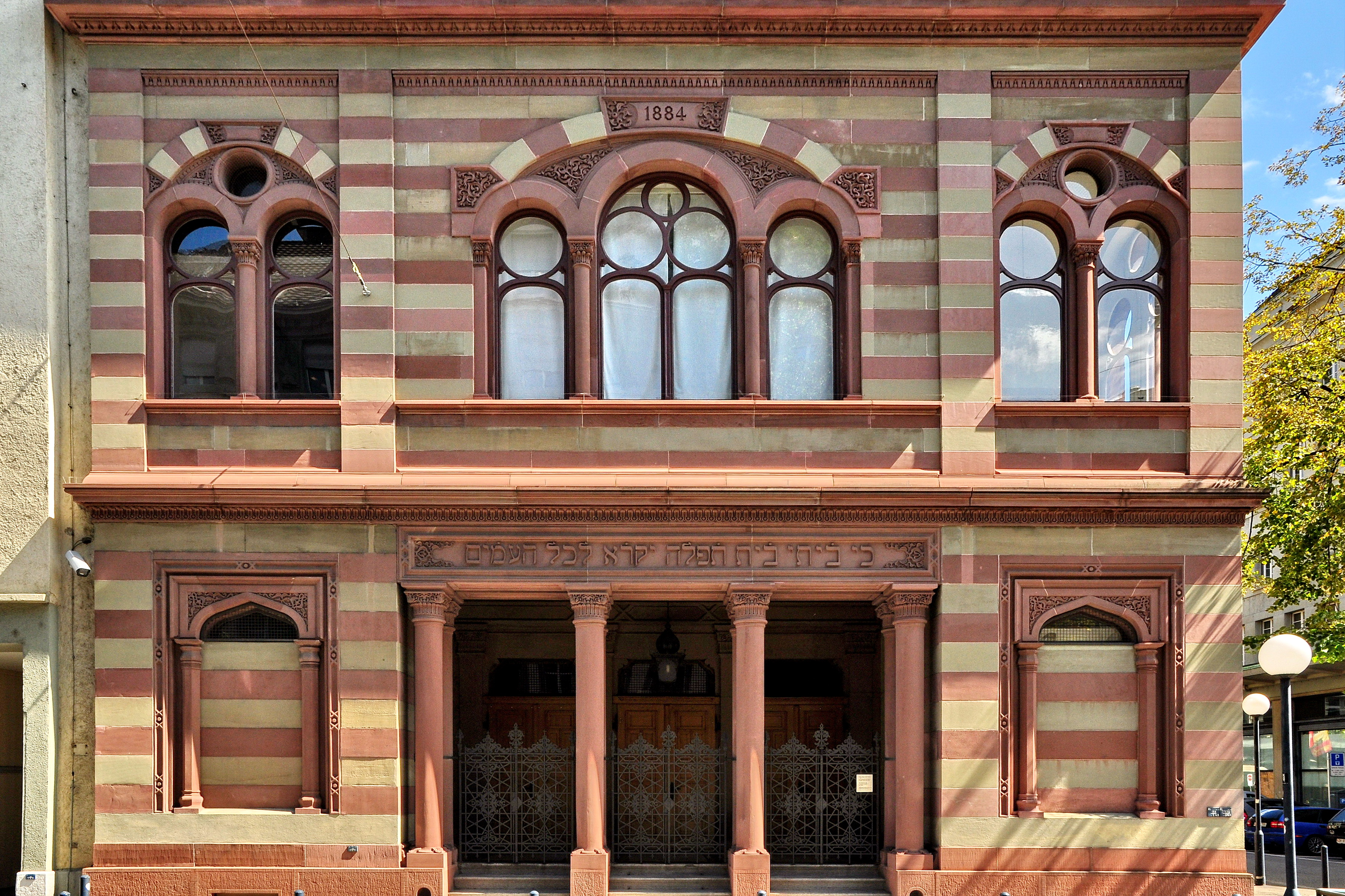
Synagoge Zürich-Löwenstrasse

The Surbtal was significantly influenced by the so-called Surbtaler Juden (literally Surbtal Jews). After the 1250s pogroms in Switzerland, between 1623 and 1633 the Jewish population in Switzerland was expelled from all Swiss municipalities and settled in Oberlengnau – finally, they were 'allowed' to settle only in Lengnau and Endingen, in accordance with a resolution of the Tagsatzung in 1678. Their vernacular, the Surbtaler Jiddisch (literally Surbtal Yiddish), was one of the last spoken dialects of the Western Yiddish language in the late 20th century. Today there are only a few, mostly elderly Jews who know the dialect, and in the 1970s the sound archives began recording what is left of the dialect. In 1976 Florence Guggenheim-Grünberg, a Swiss linguist and historian, published a dictionary of the Surbtal Yiddish.

Because of the proximity to the fairs/markets in Zurzach, as from the 17th century also settled Jewish merchants in Lengnau and Endingen, as the Jewish citizens were not allowed to operate agriculture or exercise a craft. Livelihood they earned mainly on the internationally important Zurzach fair and the market in Baden. From 1696 all Jewish inhabitants had to buy all 16 years expensive protective shield letters from the Landvogt of Baden. From 1776 the right of residence of all Jews in Switzerland was definitely limited to Endingen and Lengnau. Since they were allowed to stay during the night only in the two villages, their radius of action was strongly limited. At the same time, the Jews of the Surbtal formed a Beth din or rabbinical court with Tiengen. The Jewish citizens built two large synagogues, in 1765 in Endingen (rebuilt in 1852) and in Lengnau in 1750 (rebuilt 1847).

Beginning in 1603, the deceased Jews of the Surbtal communities were buried on a small Rhein river island, the so-called Judenäule ("Jew's island") which was leased by the Jewish community. As the island was repeatedly flooded and devastated, in 1750 the Surbtal Jews asked the Tagsatzung to establish a cemetery in the vicinity of their communities in the Surb valley. Once a year, the communal chevra kadisha (hevra kadishah, Aramaic: חברא קדישא, Ḥebh'ra Qaddisha, meaning "holy society") visited the graves on the island. In 1750 the Tagsatzung 'allowed' the Jewish communities of Endingen and Lengnau to acquire woodland on a small hill between Endingen and Lengnau to establish the Endingen cemetery. The cemetery has been expanded several times; based on an 1859 agreement, two-fifths of the cemetery belong to the Israelite community of Lengnau, and three-fifths to the Israelite community of Endingen.

However, the Jewish residents were only allowed to enter a few professions, such as trade, particularly as livestock dealers and so on. Houses were built with two separate entrances, one for Jews and one for Christians. They were under the high and low courts of the Baden bailiff. The Jewish population was fairly well tolerated, self-managed and maintained its own school. In March 1798 the French revolutionary troops overturned the Swiss regime and proclaimed the Helvetic Republic; the Surb region now belonged to the short-lived Canton of Baden from 1798 to 1803. The new state was soon hated in large parts of the population, resulting in the 1802 civil war. This hatred erupted on 21 September 1802 during the so-called Zwetschgenkrieg against the Jewish fellow citizens, who were considered supporters of the new liberal government. A horde of over 800 residents from neighboring villages fell over Endingen and Lengnau, and enriched themselves from the belongings of those defenseless Jews, while the Christian inhabitants were largely unmolested.

The first Swiss Federal Constitution of 12 September 1848 provided for the cantons' sovereignty, as long as this did not impinge on the Federal Constitution. Among others, Jewish citizens from Endingen and Lengnau, 80 Jewish women, children and men in all, were allowed by the authorities to settle in the whole territory of the Canton of Zurich in 1850, in 1862 about 175 people, including 100 in the Zürich district. The first Jewish community in the city of Zürich within the past 438 years, exceptionally appreciated the support by the city authorities. In 1866 the Swiss Federal Constitution granted freedom of establishment and in 1874 freedom of worship, whereupon to about 1920, most of the Jewish citizens left the Surbtal. After the repeal of the majority of the legal restrictions on Jewish citizens on 3 March 1862, on 29 March 1862 the Israelitischer Kultusverein (Jewish society) was founded by 12 members in Zürich, and in 1880 its name was changed in the present Israelitische Cultusgemeinde Zürich (ICZ). On 16 September 1884 their first synagogue, Synagoge Zürich Löwenstrasse was inaugurated. In 1879 the Jewish bürgergemeinde of Neu-Endingen was founded which remained independent until 1983 when it merged into the bürgergemeinde of Endingen.

== Transportation ==
After the Wehntalbahn railway was not continued towards the Surbtal in 1891, in 1921 a Postauto bus line was opened. Until 1954 the completion of the cantonal Surbtalstrasse road was carried out. From the 1960s trade, industrial arts and light industry companies settled in the still rural Surbtal region.

== Literature ==
- Roger Sablonier: Adel im Wandel. Untersuchungen zur sozialen Situation des ostschweizerischen Adels um 1300. Chronos-Verlag, Zürich 1979/2000. ISBN 978-3-905313-55-0.
- Picard, Jacques; Bhend, Angela (2020). Jüdischer Kulturraum Aargau (in German). HIER UND JETZT. ISBN 978-3-03919-508-4.

== See also ==
- History of the Jews in Switzerland
- Jüdischer Friedhof Endingen
- House of Regensberg
- Mammutmuseum Niederweningen
- Wehntal
