= Jüdischer Friedhof Endingen =

Jewish cemetery in Aargau Canton, Switzerland

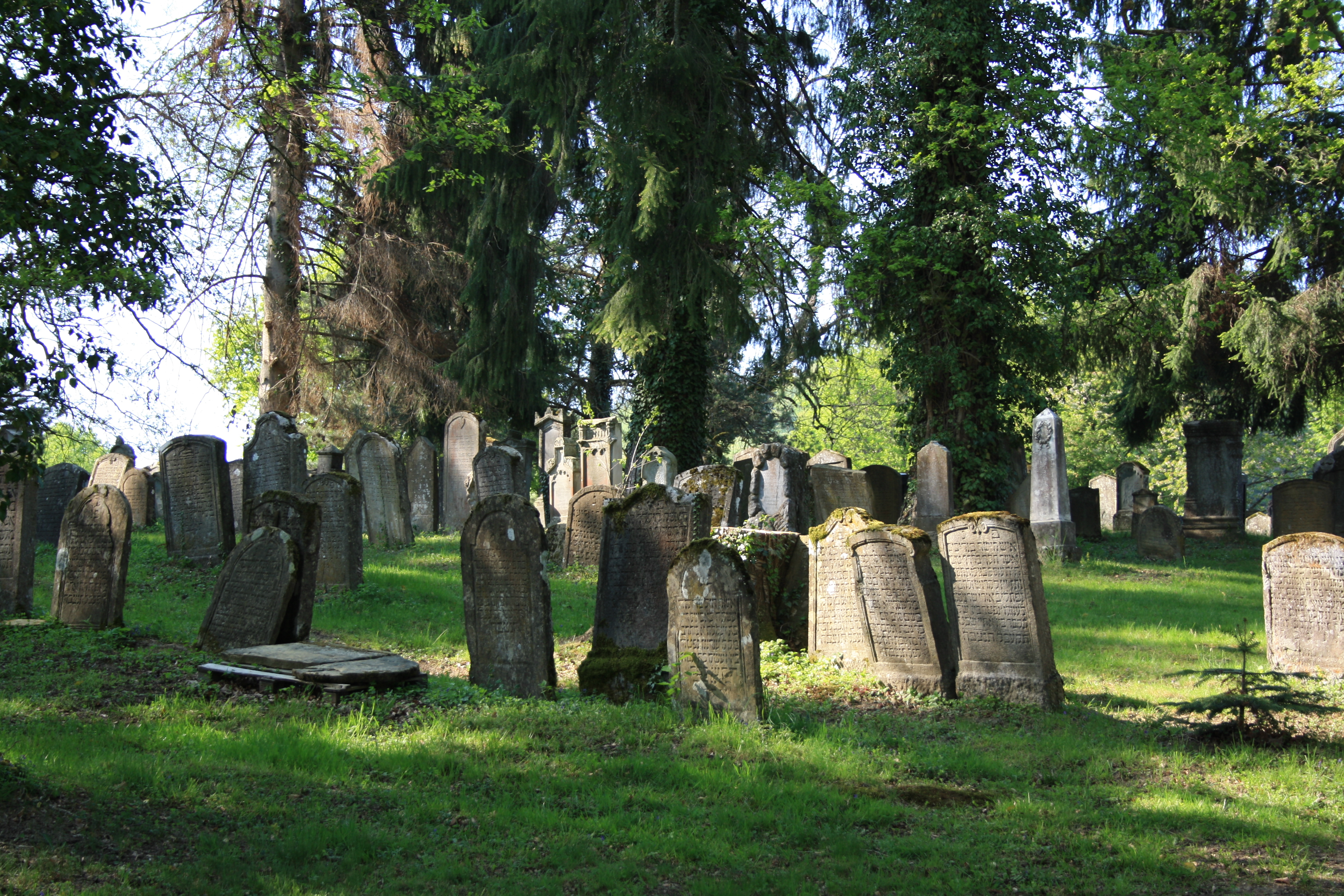
- Interactive map of Jüdischer Friedhof Endingen

Details
- Location: Endingen, Surbtal, Canton of Aargau
- Country: Switzerland
- Coordinates: 47.5329°N 8.3089°E
- Style: Jewish
- Owned by: Jewish community of Endingen and Lengnau
- No. of graves: about 2,700

Jüdischer Friedhof Endingen (literally: Endingen Jewish Cemetery) is the oldest and largest Jewish cemetery in Switzerland, situated in the Surb Valley in the Canton of Aargau. The cemetery is listed in Swiss inventory of cultural property of national significance.

== Judenäule ==
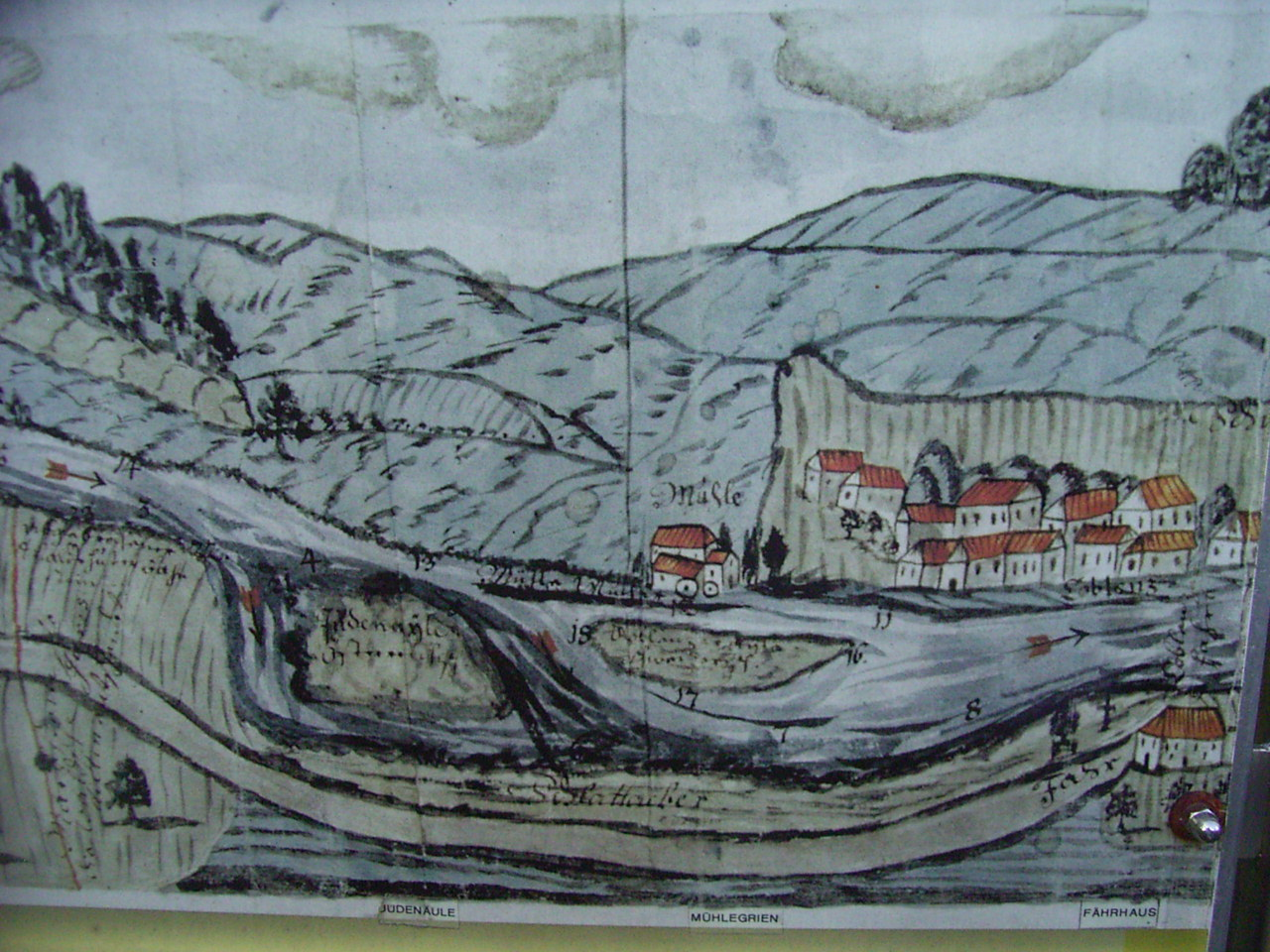
Judenäule around 1750

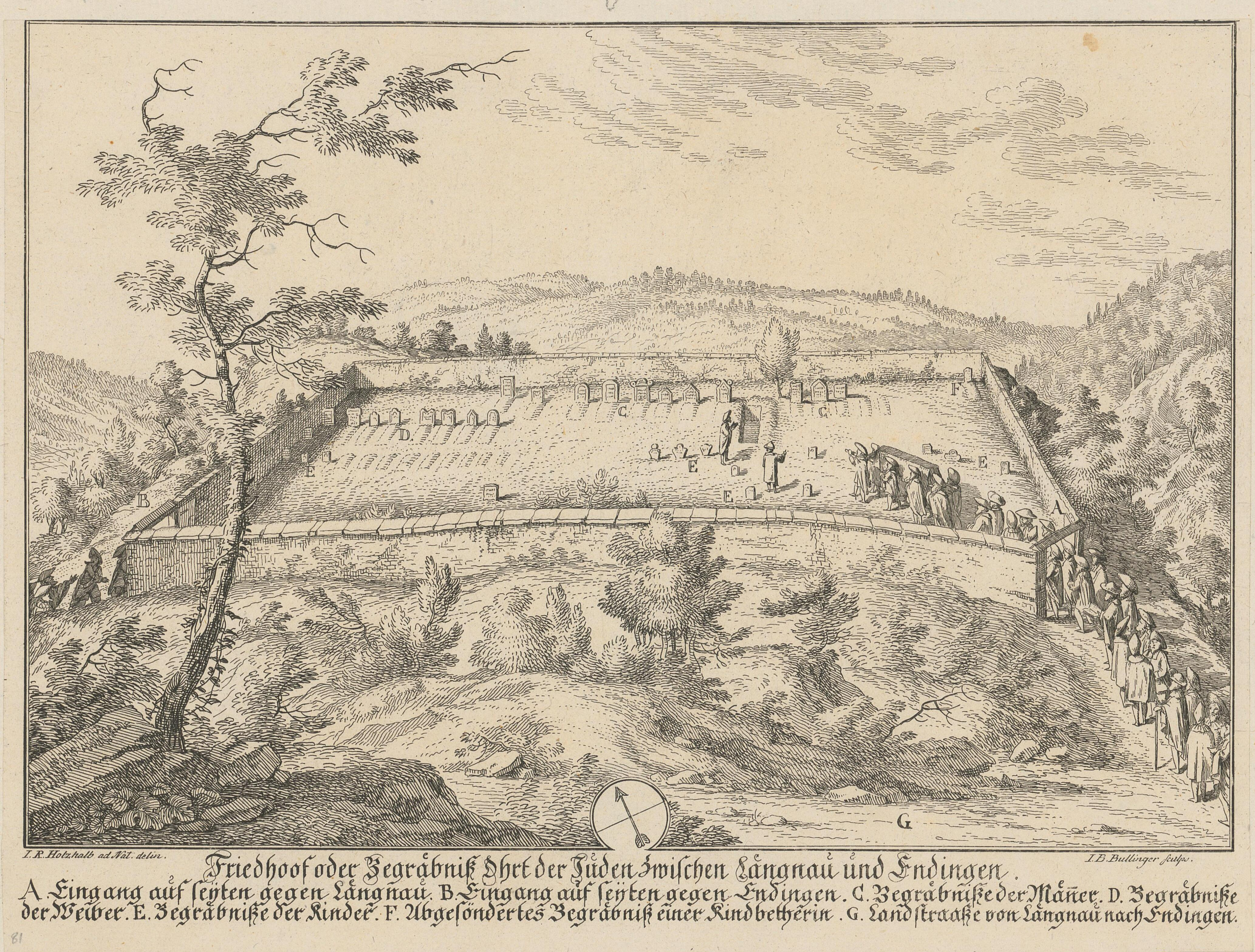
1754 drawing of the cemetery by Johann Caspar Ulrich

Four centuries ago, the deceased Jews from the communities of Endingen and Lengnau were buried in a cemetery on a small Rhein river island, the so-called Judenäule, situated in the present German city of Waldshut-Tiengen. The island was leased by the Jewish community of the Grafschaft Baden in 1603. However, as the island was repeatedly flooded and devastated, in 1750 the Surbtal Jews asked the Tagsatzung to establish a cemetery in the vicinity of their communities in the Surbtal valley. In 1812/13 the Judenäule was purchased by the Lengnau and Endingen communities for all time. The island was now barely used as a burial ground.

Once a year, the communal chevra kadisha (hevra kadishah, Aramaic: חברא קדישא, Ḥebh'ra Qaddisha, meaning "holy society") visited the graves on the island and took care of the graves by the mid-19th century. Since then, the grave stones fell gradually or were stolen by residents of surrounding municipalities for building purposes. In the 1920s, there were only three grave stones from 1690, 1699 and 1708 on the river island. In 1954/55 a river regulation was carried out – the remains of more than 80 graves were exhumed, buried in the Endingen cemetery, and the preserved grave stones (oldest from 1674) were re-erected there.

== History of the Endingen cemetery ==
The Jewish communities of Endingen and Lengnau were able to acquire woodland on a small hill to establish a cemetery, between the two villages, at the price of 340 Florins in 1750. The oldest tombs are located in the southeast area of the cemetery towards Lengnau. The cemetery has been expanded several times. Based on an 1859 agreement, two-fifths of the cemetery belong to the Israelite community of Lengnau, and three-fifths to the Israelite community of Endingen. In 1963 a new plot, measuring 0.4864 hectares (1.2 acres), was bought which is owned by the Verein für Erhaltung der Synagogen und des Friedhofes Endingen-Lengnau (literally: "Association for the preservation of the synagogues and the cemetery Endingen-Lengnau").

== Characteristic features ==
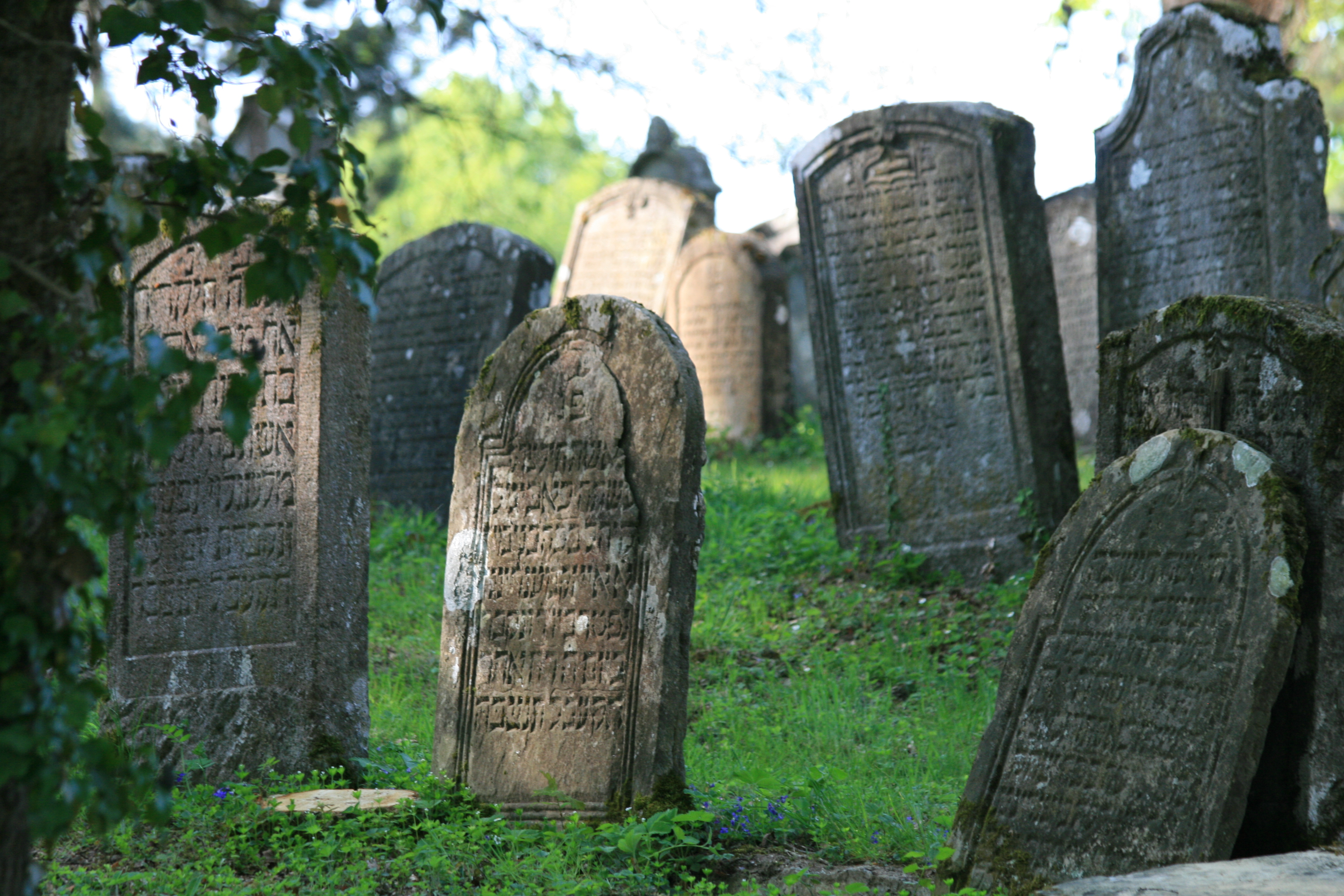
Grave stones in the cemetery

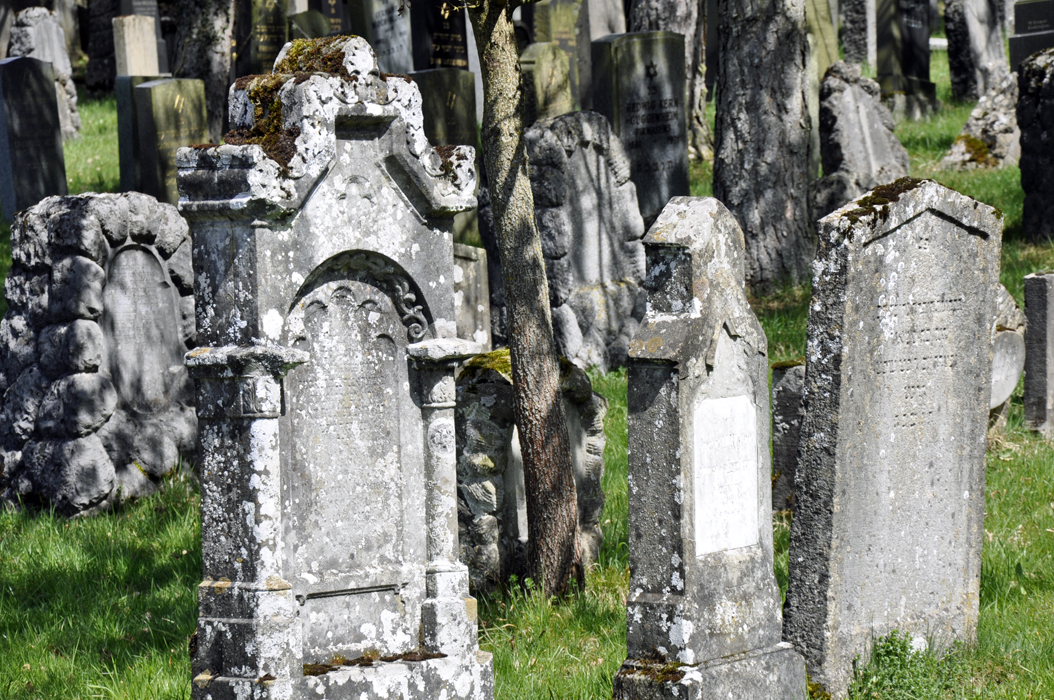

The graves are arranged in north–south direction, but it's not known why the orientation differs from those in other Jewish cemeteries. Men and women were buried in separate rows. Overall, more than 2,700 people are buried in the cemetery. In the oldest part of the cemetery, right next to the road, the grave stones are uniformly, carried out in the basic form of traditional steles. Most were made of the local sandstone, those of the wealthier families from shell limestone. From the mid-19th century, marble was increasingly used, and in addition to the usual Hebrew grave inscriptions also in German with Latin letters. Increasingly, the grave stones were made in the Neoclassical style and neo-Gothic shapes, also broken pillars for young deceased and obelisks were used. Since the mid-1940s, according to the spirit of the age, simple and uniform grave stone were used again. The inscriptions were also restricted to the bare minimum and carried out partly in Hebrew.

== Cultural heritage of national importance ==
By decision of the Government Council of the Canton of Aargau, since 13 December 1963 the cemetery is set under protection. The cemetery is listed in the Swiss inventory of cultural property of national and regional significance as a Class A object of national importance.

== See also ==
- Surbtaler Juden

== Literature ==
- Edith Hunziker and Ralph Weingarten: Schweizerische Kunstführer GSK, Band 771/772: Die Synagogen von Lengnau und Endingen und der jüdische Friedhof. Bern 2005, ISBN 3-85782-771-8.
- Florence Guggenheim-Grünberg: Der Friedhof auf der Judeninsel im Rhein bei Koblenz. 1956, ISBN.
