= Victor Umbricht =

Swiss lawyer and diplomat (1919–1988)

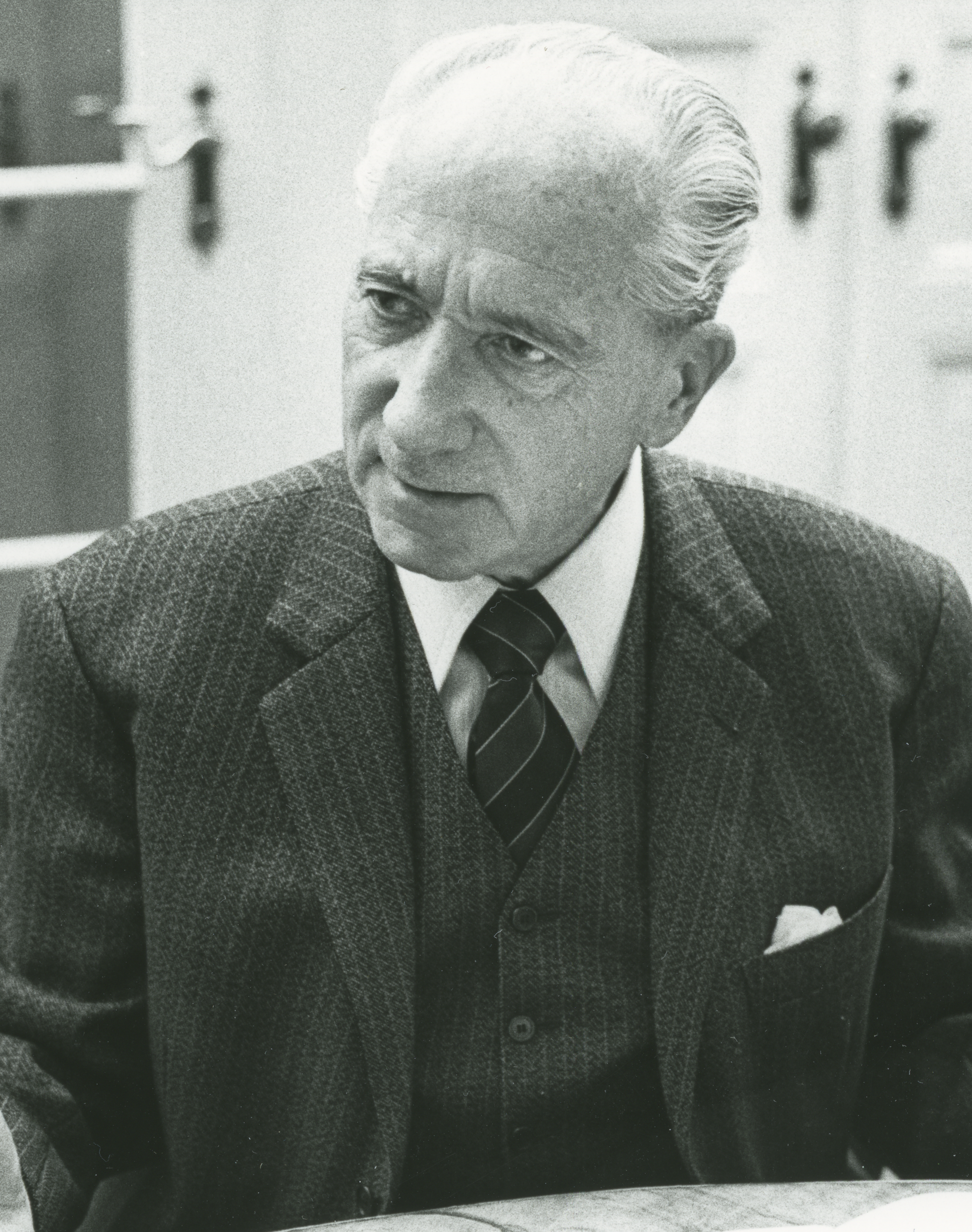
- Born: Victor Hermann Umbricht; 25 October 1915; Endingen, Switzerland
- Died: 14 July 1988 (aged 72); Basel, Switzerland
- Occupation: Diplomat

Victor Hermann Umbricht (born 25 October 1915 in Endingen; died 14 July 1988 in Basel) was a Swiss lawyer, diplomat and board member of the Ciba-Geigy pharmaceutical company.

== Biography ==
Umbricht was a court clerk in Baden from 1939 to 1941. In 1941 he joined the Swiss Federal Political Department, for which he worked as a diplomat in Ankara, London and Washington until 1953. From 1953 to 1957 he was in Washington as Deputy Director of the World Bank for Europe, Africa and Australasia. In 1957 he returned to Switzerland and was director of the Swiss Federal Tax Administration until 1960.

In the same year, he moved to the private sector and joined Ciba AG. Initially, he was active as a UN financial advisor in the Democratic Republic of the Congo in 1960, where he co-founded the Central Bank. In 1962 he went to the US and headed the Ciba branch there until 1965. After his return to Switzerland, he became a member and delegate of the Board of Directors of Ciba-Geigy AG until 1985. The Board of Directors regularly made him available for international humanitarian tasks.

1968 to 1976, he was President of the Mekong Committee (Organization for the Economic Development of the Mekong Region). From 1972 to 1973 he headed the UN Organization for the fight against hunger and for the reconstruction in Bangladesh, the United Nations Relief Operation Dacca (UNROD). From 1970 to 1979, Umbricht was a member and vice-president of the International Committee of the Red Cross (ICRC). In addition, under his leadership, ICRC missions were carried out in Nicaragua, Guatemala and Mexico from 1977 to 1979.

In 1977, after Kenya, Tanzania and Uganda dissolved the East African Community and blocked common assets, he was named the East Africa mediator, in the rank of UN Under-Secretary-General, from 1977 to 1984, with mandates from the World Bank and the United Nations Development Programme (UNDP). After lengthy negotiations, a de-entwining agreement was concluded in 1984.

Victor Umbricht was also involved in domestic politics: Since the 1970s he served as a member of the advisory commission on the accession of Switzerland to the UN, which he was skeptical about. In 1962 he founded the Swiss Center in New York and was its president until 1970. From 1970 to 1986 he was in chair of the Swiss-Chinese Society. During his work for the UN, Victor Umbricht served under four UNO secretaries-general.

His estate is located in the Archive for Contemporary History of ETH Zurich.

== Honors ==
- 1966 Honorary Doctorate of the University of Basel
- 1984 Grotius Medal of the Hague Academy of International Law
- 1987 Honorary Doctor of the University of Zurich
- 1987 Award by the City of Los Angeles for his humanitarian work

== Publications ==
- Multilateral mediation. Practical Experiences and Lessons. Dordrecht, Boston 1989, ISBN 90-247-3779-6
