= Salomon Sulzer =

Austrian hazzan and composer

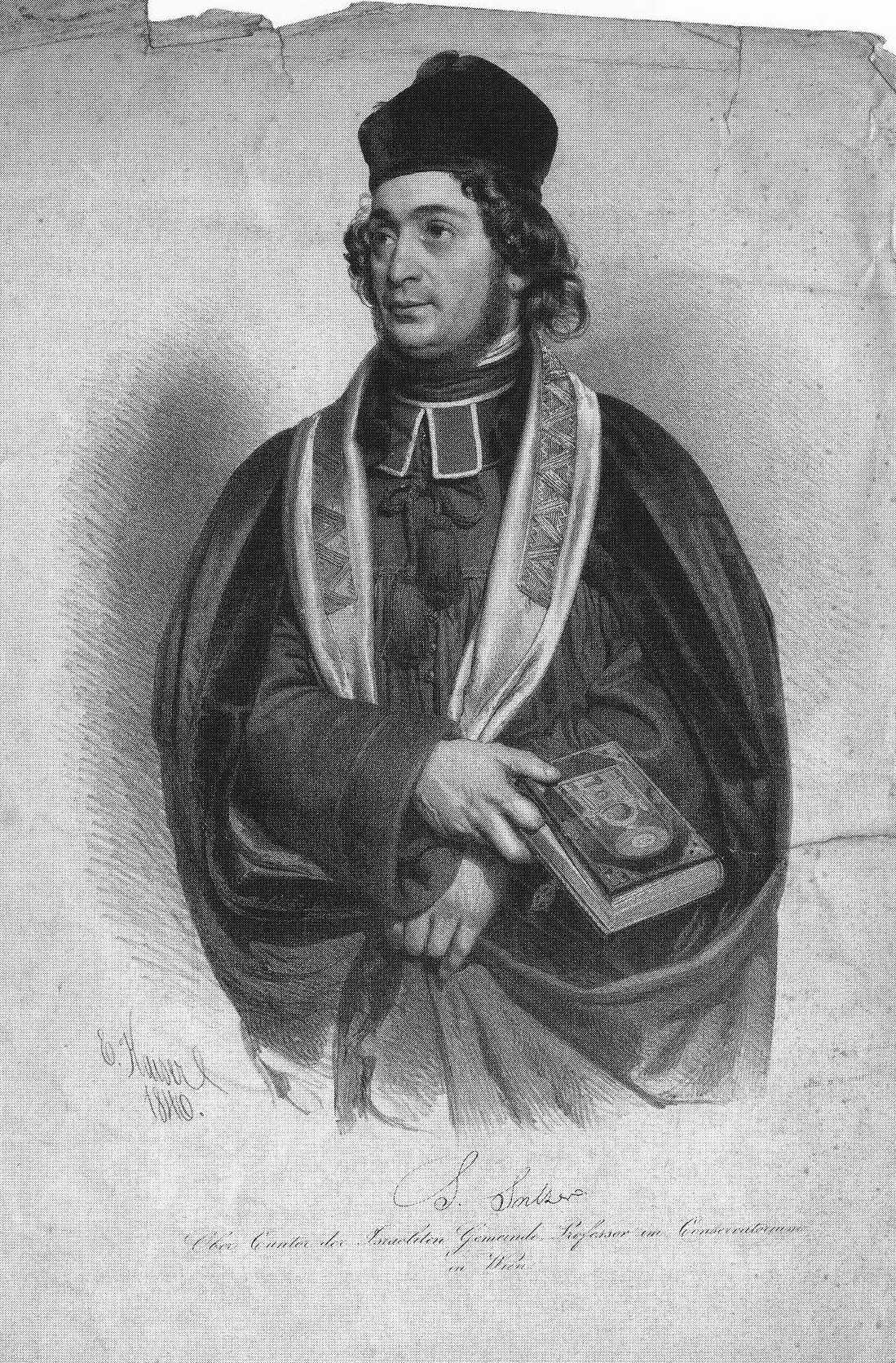

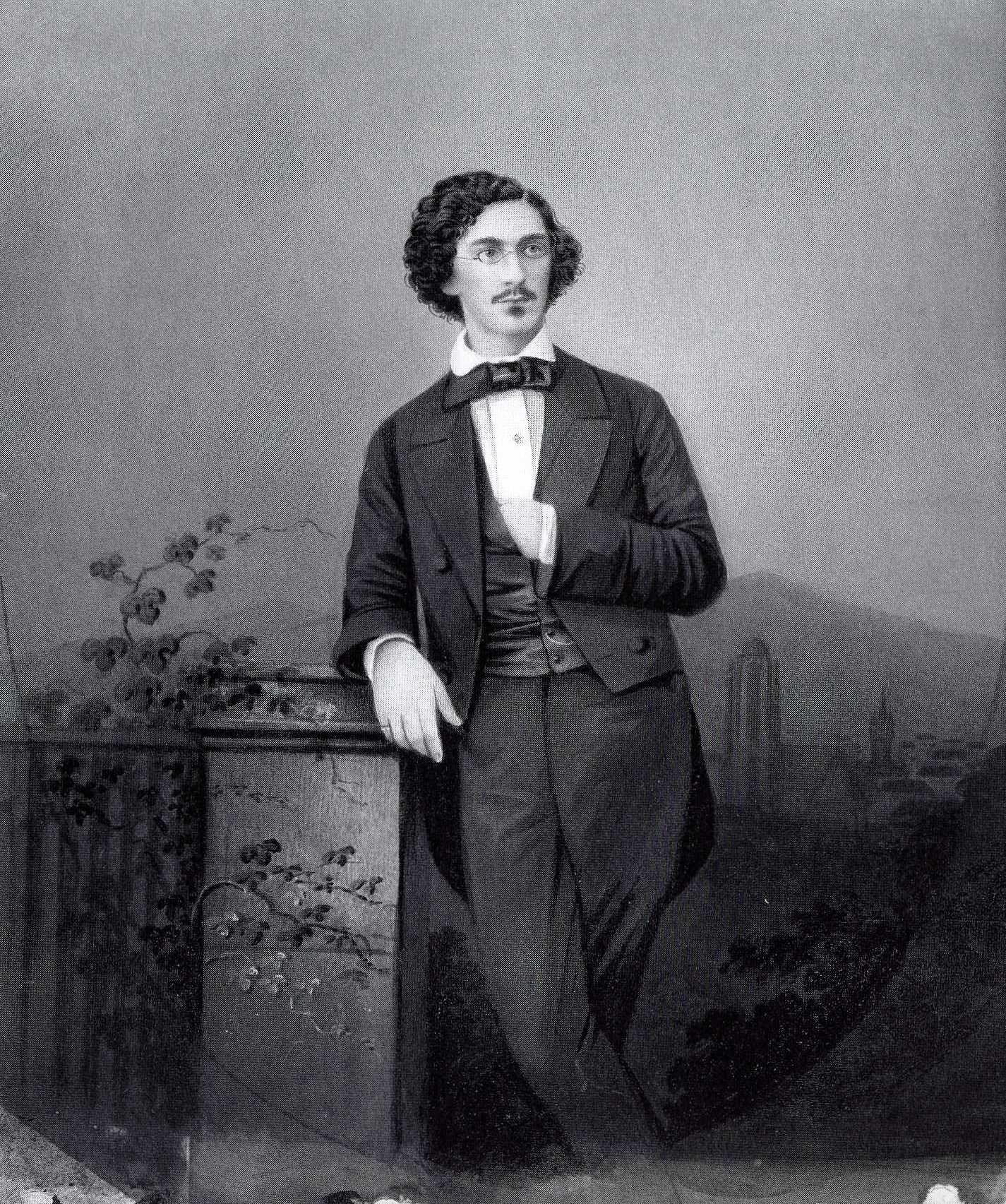

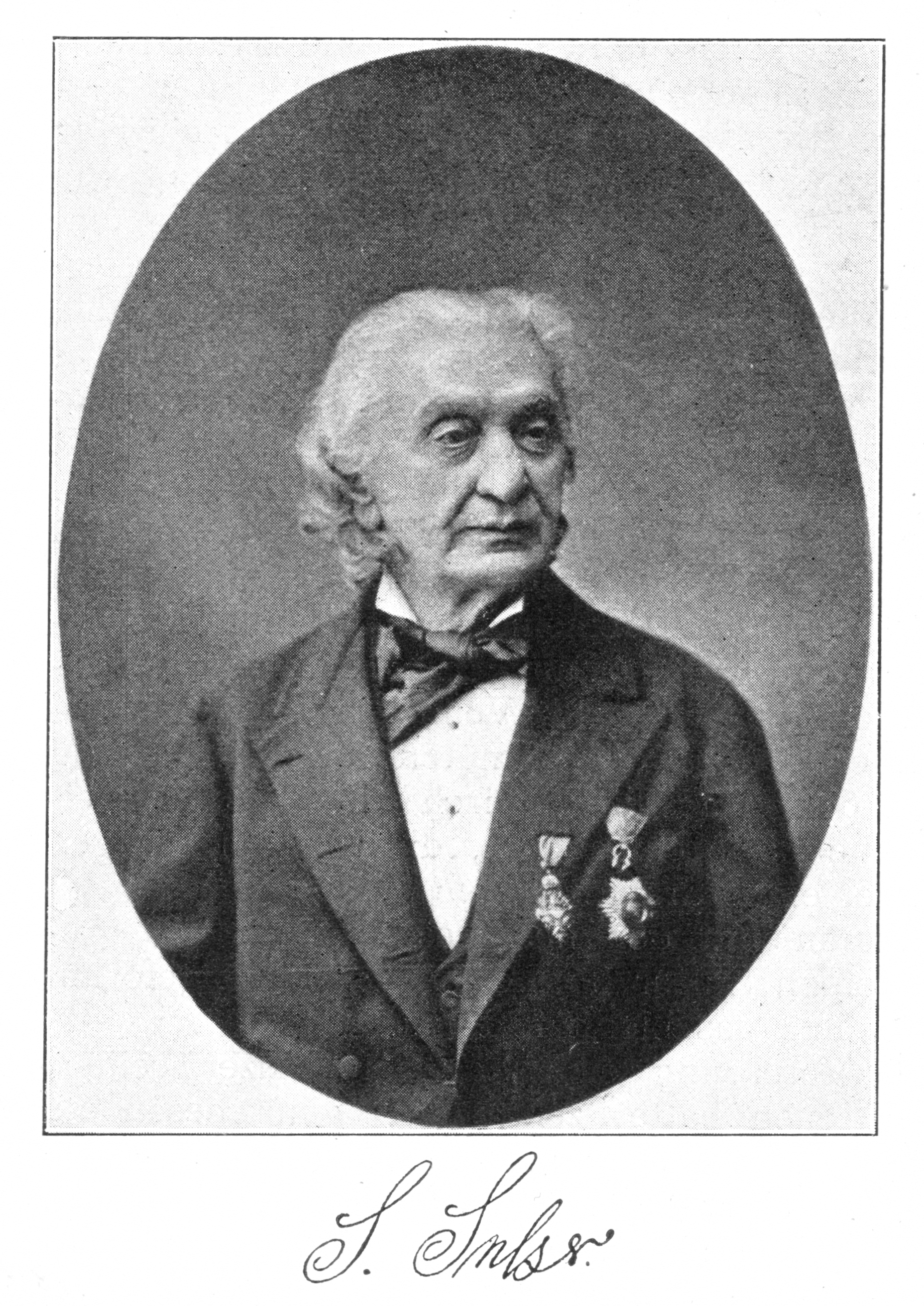

Salomon Sulzer (Hebrew: סלומון זולצר, 30 March 1804 – 17 January 1890) was an Austrian hazzan (cantor) and composer.

== Biography ==
Sulzer was born in Hohenems, Vorarlberg. His family, which prior to 1813 bore the name of Levi, had moved to Hohenems from Sulz in 1748. He was educated for the cantorate, studying first under the cantors of Endingen (Switzerland) and Karlsruhe, with whom he traveled extensively, and later under Salomon Eichberg, cantor at Hohenems and Düsseldorf. In 1820 Sulzer was appointed cantor at Hohenems, where he modernized the ritual, and introduced a choir. At the insistence of Rabbi Isaac Noah Mannheimer of Vienna he was called to the Austrian capital as chief cantor in 1826. There he reorganized the song service of the synagogue, retaining the traditional chants and melodies, but harmonizing them in accordance with modern views.

Sulzer's "Shir Tziyyon" (2 vols., Vienna, 1840-1865) established models for the various sections of the musical service—the recitative of the cantor, the choral of the choir, and the responses of the congregation—and it contained music for Sabbaths, festivals, weddings, and funerals which has been introduced into nearly all the synagogues of the world. In the compilation of this work he was assisted by some of the best musical composers of Vienna, where he died.

Sulzer published also a small volume of songs for the Sabbath-school, entitled "Duda'im"; and a number of separate compositions, both secular and sacred. His responses are tuneful, and though more melodious than the choral chant of the Catholic Church, show a strong resemblance to it. In all his compositions strict attention is paid to the Hebrew text; and a scrupulous adherence to syntactic construction is observed throughout. The collection "Zwanzig Gesänge für den Israelitischen Gottesdienst" (Vienna, 1892) was printed posthumously. In his "Denkschrift an die Wiener Cultusgemeinde" he sums up his ideas on the profession of cantor. Sulzer, who was widely famed as a singer and as an interpreter of Schubert, was a professor at the imperial conservatorium of Vienna, a knight of the Order of Francis Joseph and a maestro of the Accademia Nazionale di Santa Cecilia in Rome. Universally recognized as the regenerator of synagogal music, he has been called the "father of the modern cantorate". The Jewish Museum in Hohenems in western Austria (www.jm-hohenems.at) houses a documentation of Sulzer's career in its permanent exhibition and an extensive genealogy on www.hohenemsgenealogy.at.

== Family ==
Sulzer had several children: Marie (1828–1892) was an operatic soprano, appearing in France, Spain Italy and Vienna; Julius (1830–1891) was a composer and conductor in opera houses; Henriette (1832–1907) and Sophie (1840–1885) were also singers; Joseph (1850–1926) was a cellist and composer, a member of the orchestra at the Hofburgtheater in Vienna and of the Hellmesberger Quartet. Musician and administrator Lionel Salter was a descendent.

== See also ==
- Jewish music
- IKG Wien
