= Lengnau, Aargau =

Lengnau
- Municipality
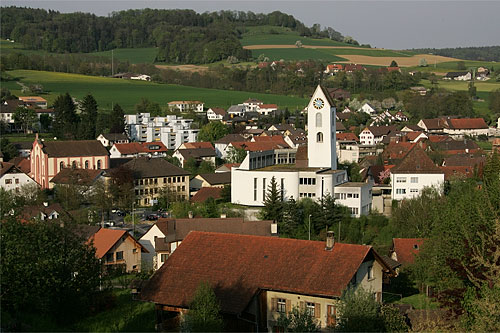

- Flag Coat of arms
- Location of Lengnau
- Location within Switzerland Location within Canton of Aargau
- Coordinates: 47°31′N 8°20′E
- Country: Switzerland
- Canton: Aargau
- District: Zurzach

Area
  - Total: 12.67 km^{2} (4.89 sq mi)
- Elevation: 415 m (1,362 ft)

Population (December 2005)
  - Total: 2,434
  - Density: 192.1/km^{2} (497.6/sq mi)
- Time zone: UTC+01:00 (CET)
  - Summer (DST): UTC+02:00 (CEST)
- Postal code: 5426
- SFOS number: 4312
- ISO 3166 code: CH-AG
- Surrounded by: Baldingen, Böbikon, Endingen, Freienwil, Obersiggenthal, Schneisingen, Unterehrendingen, Unterendingen, Wislikofen
- Twin towns: Lengnau, Berne (Switzerland)
- Website: www.lengnau-ag.ch

Lengnau (German pronunciation: [ˈlɛŋnaʊ]) is a municipality in the district of Zurzach in the canton of Aargau in Switzerland.

It is notable for being one of two villages where residence was permitted for Swiss Jews between 1633 and 1874. Lengnau's synagogue is listed as a heritage site of national significance.

== History ==
The remains of a Roman era farm was discovered near Lengnau. The modern municipality of Lengnau is first mentioned in 798 as Lenginwanc. The Herrschaft rights were claimed by both the Bishop of Constance and the Habsburgs. After the conquest of the Aargau in 1415, the Bishop and the County of Baden continued to dispute the rights over the village. It wasn't until the late 15th century that the rights went over entirely to the Swiss Confederation. After 1269 the low court right was held by the Teutonic Knights through their Commandry of Beuggen. Until 1400 the Bishop's vogt in Klingnau was also involved in the low court. The hamlet of Husen was under the low court of the Knights Hospitaller Commandry of Leuggern.

The Catholic parish of Lengnau was probably the proprietary church of the House of Regensberg. In 1269 the church and the other rights of the Lords of Regensberg passed to the Beuggen family.

St. Martin's Church was built in 1977, incorporating the older baroque choir and tower. The Reformed Church members are part of the parish of Tegerfelden since 1940. Before that, it is unclear what parish they may have belonged to. The Jewish population built their first synagogue in 1750 and the second in 1847, which shaped much of the modern village.

While the Christian residents mainly worked in agriculture (crops and increasingly in the 19th century, livestock farming), the Jews (who were forbidden land or cattle) worked in trade or peddling.

Lengnau can be reached through a bus line which had run since 1921. In 1953 it was connected by the Surbtalstrasse road with Baden. In 1968, an industrial zone was opened, which in the decades that followed attracted about 80 companies. This has led to a population increase, and since the 1970s a number of new single-and multi-family neighborhoods have been built.

=== Jewish history ===
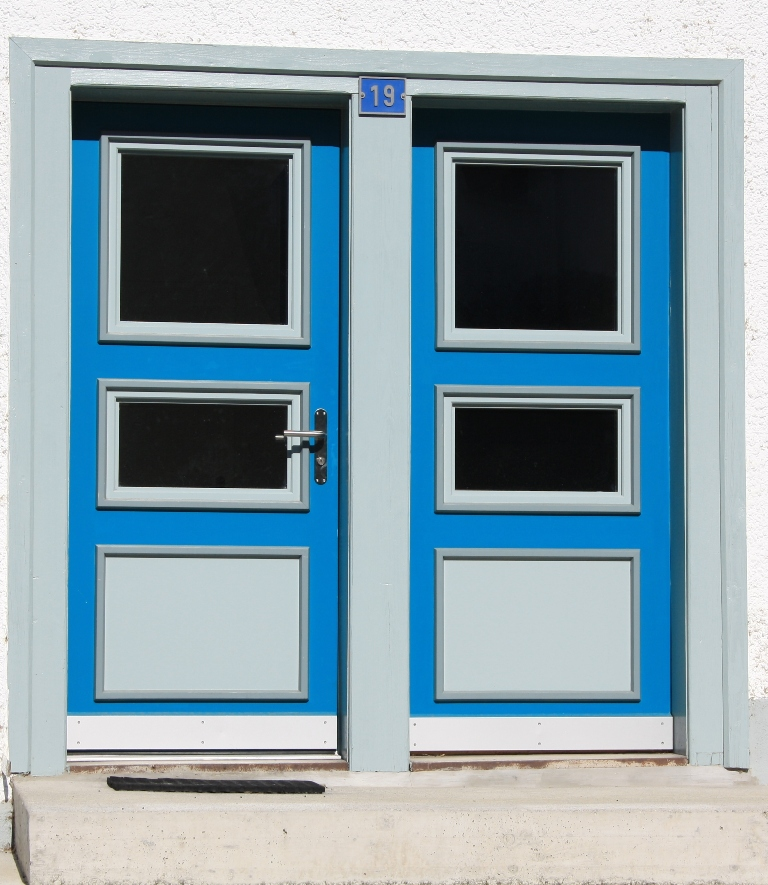
Two separate doors (one for Jews and one for Christians) on a house in Lengnau

In accordance with the resolution of the Tagsatzung in 1678, Jews were allowed to settle in the communities of the Surb valley. After 1776, they were further restricted to living in only Endingen and Lengnau. This immigration slowly but steadily changed the appearance of the communities. The village of Endingen never built a Christian church, only a Jewish synagogue. The local Christians traveled to neighboring villages to attend church. The Jewish and Christian families often lived under one roof.

Beginning in 1603, the deceased Jews of the Surbtal communities were buried on a small Rhein river island, the so-called Judenäule ("Jew's island") which was leased by the Jewish community. As the island was repeatedly flooded and devastated, in 1750 the Surbtal Jews asked the Tagsatzung to establish a cemetery in the vicinity of their communities in the Surb valley.

The Jewish population was fairly well tolerated (except for the Zwetschgenkrieg or "plum war" riots in 1802), self-managed and maintained its own school.

However, the Jewish resident were only allowed to enter a few professions, such as trade. Houses were built with two separate entrances, one for Jews and one for Christians. They were under the high and low courts of the Baden bailiff and had to buy "protection and safety" letters from the authorities. It wasn't until 1876 that Jews were granted full equality in civil rights and allowed to travel. By 1920, most Jews had left the community. The members of the Jewish citizen's corporation were not included in the local citizen's corporation of Lengnau, but by a decree in 1879 they were formed into the local citizen's corporation of Neu-Lengnau. This was merged in 1983 with the local citizen's corporation of Lengnau and all common property was transferred into the merged citizen's corporation. In 1903 the Swiss Israelite retirement home of Lengnau opened.

=== Plum war ===
In 1798, the French invaded Switzerland and set up the Helvetic Republic. The Republic attempted to modernize and centralize the Swiss Confederation. As part of this new, liberal state, Swiss reformers attempted to enforce the emancipation of the Jews in the new central Swiss Parliament in Aarau. When that failed, they attempted to get the French to force this change on the new Swiss government. The changes of the Republic were not embraced by many of the Swiss and the issue of emancipation for the Jews became another contentious issue between the old order and the new government. Finally in 1802 the population revolted and turned against the Jews. The mob looted the Jewish villages of Endingen and Lengnau. At the same time other revolts, such as the Stecklikrieg, stretched the French Army too far. Napoleon Bonaparte lacked the troops to bring peace to Switzerland, and also he needed the Swiss regiments for his campaigns. Seeking a peaceful resolution to the uprising, in 1803 he issued the Act of Mediation. The Act of Mediation was a compromise between the Ancien Regime and a Republic. One of the compromises in the Act was that no further rights were granted to the Jews.

== Geography ==
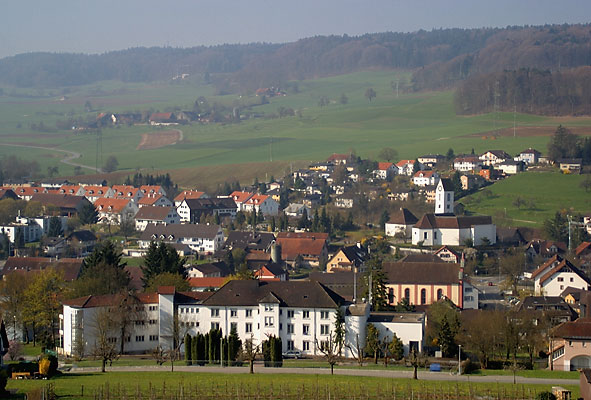
Lengnau village

Aerial view from 300 m by Walter Mittelholzer (1922)

Lengnau has an area, as of 2009, of 12.67 square kilometers (4.89 sq mi). Of this area, 6.64 km^{2} (2.56 sq mi) or 52.4% is used for agricultural purposes, while 4.77 km^{2} (1.84 sq mi) or 37.6% is forested. Of the rest of the land, 1.22 km^{2} (0.47 sq mi) or 9.6% is settled (buildings or roads), 0.01 km^{2} (2.5 acres) or 0.1% is either rivers or lakes.

Of the built up area, housing and buildings made up 5.0% and transportation infrastructure made up 3.6%. Out of the forested land, 36.1% of the total land area is heavily forested and 1.5% is covered with orchards or small clusters of trees. Of the agricultural land, 37.6% is used for growing crops and 13.3% is pastures, while 1.4% is used for orchards or vine crops. All the water in the municipality is flowing water.

The municipality is located in the Zurzach district, in the Surb river valley. It consists of the village of Lengnau and the hamlets of Degermoos, Husen, Himmelrich and Vogelsang.

== Coat of arms ==
The blazon of the municipal coat of arms is Gules a Horse trippant Argent on a Base Vert.

== Demographics ==
Lengnau has a population (as of December 2020) of 2,770. As of 2008, 44.3% of the population are foreign nationals. Over the last 10 years (1997–2007) the population has changed at a rate of 17.3%. Most of the population (as of 2000) speaks German (93.1%), with Albanian being second most common ( 1.8%) and Italian being third ( 1.2%).

As of 2008, the gender distribution of the population was 49.3% male and 50.7% female. The population was made up of 1,070 Swiss men (43.3% of the population), and 148 (6.0%) non-Swiss men. There were 1,106 Swiss women (44.8%), and 146 (5.9%) non-Swiss women. In 2008 there were 26 live births to Swiss citizens and 3 births to non-Swiss citizens, and in same time span there were 12 deaths of Swiss citizens. Ignoring immigration and emigration, the population of Swiss citizens increased by 14 while the foreign population increased by 3. There were 4 Swiss men who immigrated from another country back to Switzerland, 1 Swiss women who immigrated from another country back to Switzerland, 4 non-Swiss men who emigrated from Switzerland to another country and 10 non-Swiss women who emigrated from Switzerland to another country. The total Swiss population change in 2008 was an increase of 4 and the non-Swiss population change was an increase of 7 people. This represents a population growth rate of 0.4%.

The age distribution, as of 2008, in Lengnau is; 340 children or 13.8% of the population are between 0 and 9 years old and 335 teenagers or 13.6% are between 10 and 19. Of the adult population, 251 people or 10.2% of the population are between 20 and 29 years old. 356 people or 14.4% are between 30 and 39, 436 people or 17.6% are between 40 and 49, and 324 people or 13.1% are between 50 and 59. The senior population distribution is 224 people or 9.1% of the population are between 60 and 69 years old, 150 people or 6.1% are between 70 and 79, there are 48 people or 1.9% who are between 80 and 89, and there are 8 people or 0.3% who are 90 and older.

As of 2000 the average number of residents per living room was 0.56 which is about equal to the cantonal average of 0.57 per room. In this case, a room is defined as space of a housing unit of at least 4 m^{2} (43 sq ft) as normal bedrooms, dining rooms, living rooms, kitchens and habitable cellars and attics. About 57.7% of the total households were owner occupied, or in other words did not pay rent (though they may have a mortgage or a rent-to-own agreement).

As of 2000, there were 45 homes with 1 or 2 persons in the household, 337 homes with 3 or 4 persons in the household, and 424 homes with 5 or more persons in the household. As of 2000, there were 857 private households (homes and apartments) in the municipality, and an average of 2.6 persons per household. In 2008 there were 449 single family homes (or 45.9% of the total) out of a total of 979 homes and apartments. There were a total of 3 empty apartments for a 0.3% vacancy rate. As of 2007, the construction rate of new housing units was 4.5 new units per 1000 residents.

In the 2007 federal election the most popular party was the SVP which received 38% of the vote. The next three most popular parties were the CVP (27.56%), the SP (13.17%) and the FDP (9.32%). In the federal election, a total of 923 votes were cast, and the voter turnout was 55.7%.

The historical population is given in the following table:

Historical population
| Year | Pop. | ±% |
|---|---|---|
| 1799 | 950 | — |
| 1850 | 1,761 | +85.4% |
| 1900 | 1,119 | −36.5% |
| 1950 | 1,355 | +21.1% |
| 1990 | 2,040 | +50.6% |
| 2000 | 2,287 | +12.1% |

== Heritage sites of national significance ==
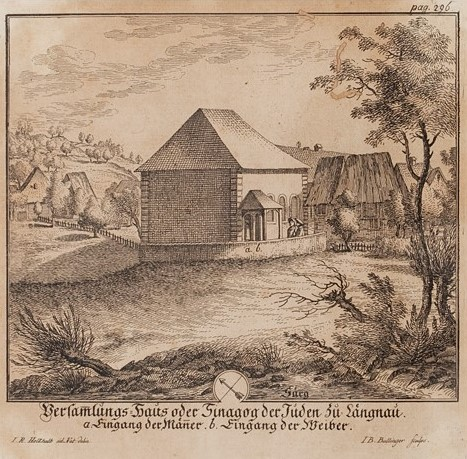
18th century etching of the synagogue in Lengnau. In the Jewish Museum of Switzerland’s collection.

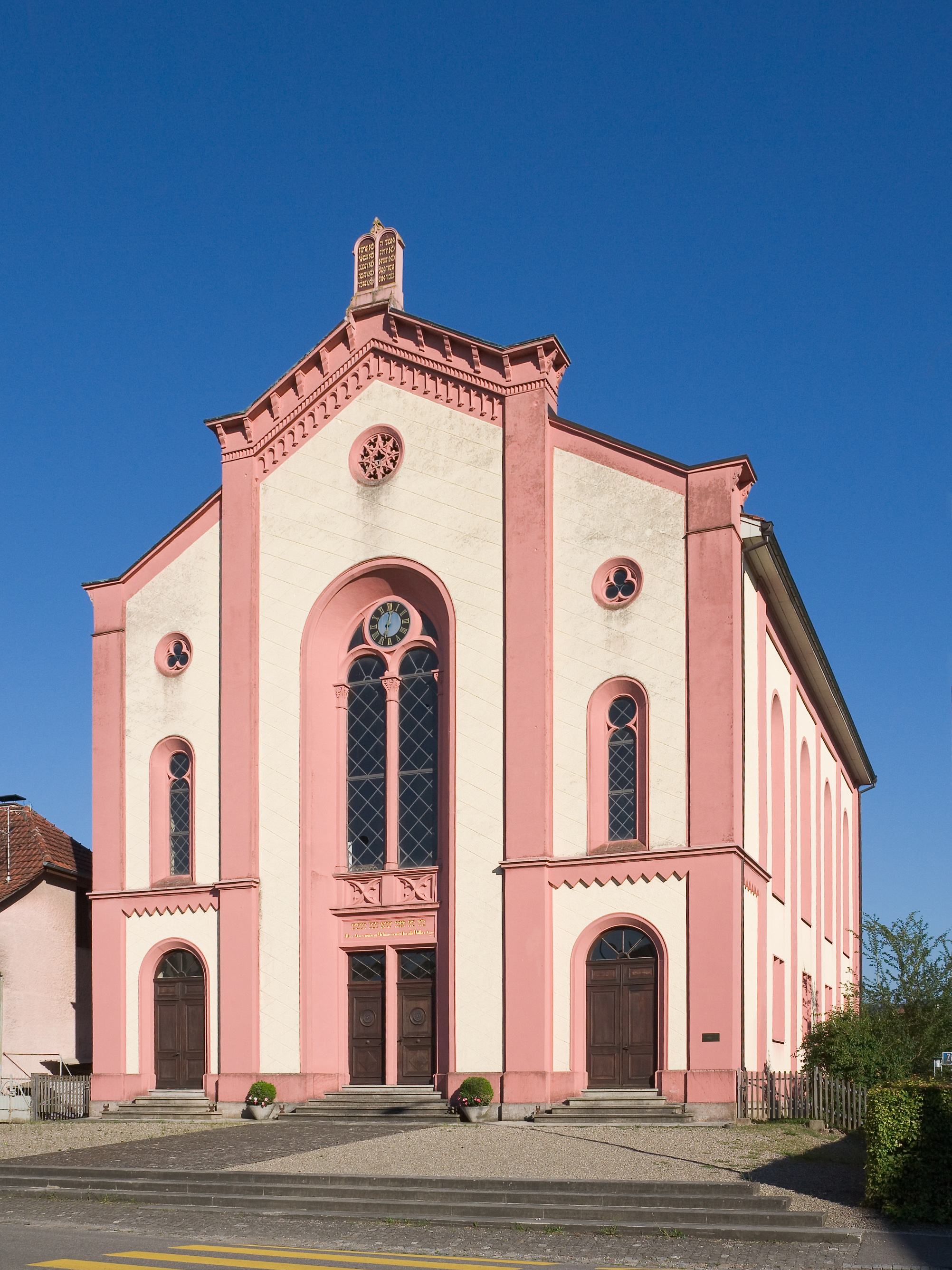
Lengnau Synagoge

The Synagogue on Zürichstrasse is listed as a Swiss heritage site of national significance.

The hamlets of Husen and Vogelsang and the entire village of Lengnau are designated as part of the Inventory of Swiss Heritage Sites.

== Economy ==
As of 2007, Lengnau had an unemployment rate of 1.53%. As of 2005, there were 128 people employed in the primary economic sector and about 51 businesses involved in this sector. 331 people are employed in the secondary sector and there are 29 businesses in this sector. 415 people are employed in the tertiary sector, with 71 businesses in this sector.

In 2000 there were 1,148 workers who lived in the municipality. Of these, 866 or about 75.4% of the residents worked outside Lengnau while 423 people commuted into the municipality for work. There were a total of 705 jobs (of at least 6 hours per week) in the municipality. Of the working population, 14.5% used public transportation to get to work, and 54.7% used a private car.

== Religion ==
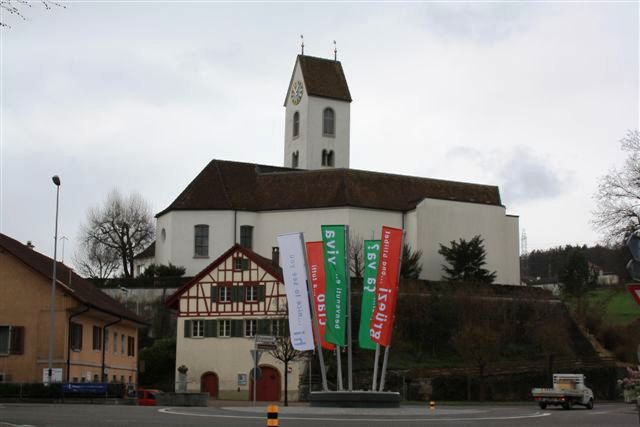
Church of Lengnau

From the 2000 census, 1,417 or 62.0% were Roman Catholic, while 475 or 20.8% belonged to the Swiss Reformed Church. Of the rest of the population, there were 6 individuals (or about 0.26% of the population) who belonged to the Christian Catholic faith.

== Education ==
The entire Swiss population is generally well educated. In Lengnau about 82.4% of the population (between age 25 and 64) have completed either non-mandatory upper secondary education or additional higher education (either university or a Fachhochschule). Of the school age population (in the 2008/2009 school year), there are 262 students attending primary school, there are 203 students attending secondary school in the municipality.

== Notable people ==
- Meyer Guggenheim (1828-1905), businessman and patriarch of the wealthy Swiss-American Guggenheim family.
- Alina Müller (born 1998), Swiss professional ice hockey forward for the Boston Fleet, Olympic bronze medalist (2014)
