= Unterendingen =

- Former municipality
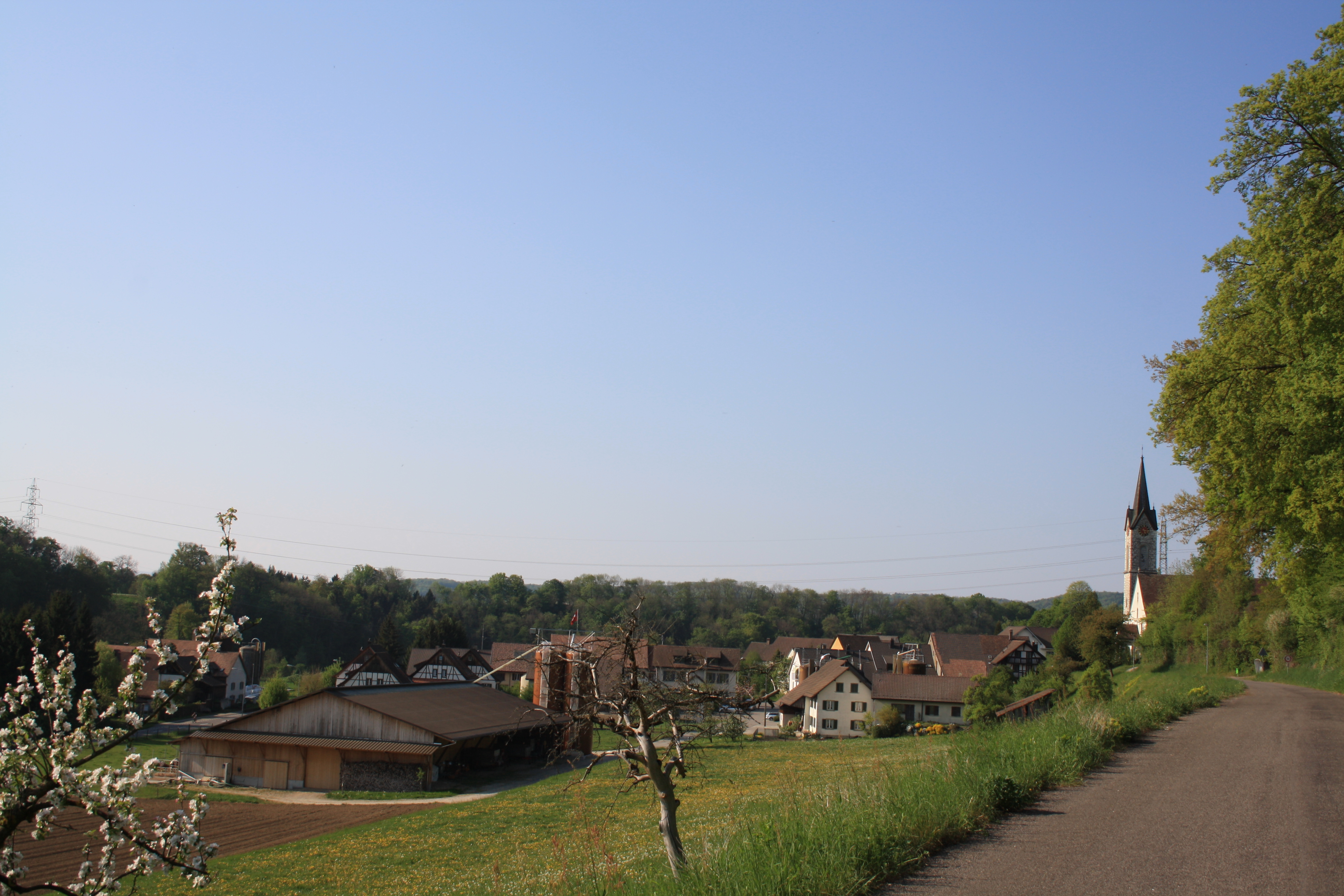

- Flag Coat of arms
- Location of Unterendingen
- Location within Switzerland Location within Canton of Aargau
- Coordinates: 47°33′N 8°18′E
- Country: Switzerland
- Canton: Aargau
- District: Zurzach

Area
  - Total: 3.45 km^{2} (1.33 sq mi)
- Elevation: 387 m (1,270 ft)

Population (Dec 2011)
  - Total: 364
  - Density: 106/km^{2} (273/sq mi)
- Time zone: UTC+01:00 (CET)
  - Summer (DST): UTC+02:00 (CEST)
- Postal code: 5305
- SFOS number: 4321
- ISO 3166 code: CH-AG
- Surrounded by: Baldingen, Endingen, Lengnau, Tegerfelden, Würenlingen
- Website: www.unterendingen.ch

Unterendingen is a former municipality in the district of Zurzach in the canton of Aargau in Switzerland. On 1 January 2014 the former municipality of Unterendingen merged into the municipality of Endingen.

== Geography ==
Aerial view (1967)

Before the merger, Unterendingen had a total area of 3.5 km^{2} (1.4 mi^{2}). Of this area, 1.85 km^{2} (0.71 sq mi) or 53.5% is used for agricultural purposes, while 1.31 km^{2} (0.51 sq mi) or 37.9% is forested. Of the rest of the land, 0.28 km^{2} (0.11 sq mi) or 8.1% is settled (buildings or roads), 0.01 km^{2} (2.5 acres) or 0.3% is either rivers or lakes.

Of the built up area, housing and buildings made up 4.3% and transportation infrastructure made up 2.9%. Out of the forested land, 36.1% of the total land area is heavily forested and 1.7% is covered with orchards or small clusters of trees. Of the agricultural land, 45.1% is used for growing crops and 6.9% is pastures, while 1.4% is used for orchards or vine crops. All the water in the municipality is flowing water.

== Coat of arms ==
The blazon of the municipal coat of arms is Per fess Azure a Fleur-de-lis mediated Argent and Gules.

== Demographics ==
Unterendingen had a population (as of 2011) of 364. As of 2008, 44.7% of the population are foreign nationals. Over the last 10 years (1997–2007) the population has changed at a rate of -5.4%. Most of the population (as of 2000) speaks German (94.9%), with Serbo-Croatian being second most common (1.9%) and French being third (0.5%).

As of 2008, the gender distribution of the population was 51.9% male and 48.1% female. The population was made up of 171 Swiss men (46.5% of the population), and 20 (5.4%) non-Swiss men. There were 164 Swiss women (44.6%), and 13 (3.5%) non-Swiss women. In 2008 there were 2 live births to Swiss citizens and in same time span there was 1 death of a Swiss citizen. Ignoring immigration and emigration, the population of Swiss citizens increased by 1 while the foreign population remained the same. There was 1 Swiss man, and 3 non-Swiss men who emigrated from Switzerland to another country. The total Swiss population change in 2008 (from all sources) was an increase of 15 and the non-Swiss population change was a decrease of 0 people. This represents a population growth rate of 4.2%.

The age distribution, as of 2008, in Unterendingen is; 28 children or 7.6% of the population are between 0 and 9 years old and 66 teenagers or 17.9% are between 10 and 19. Of the adult population, 52 people or 14.1% of the population are between 20 and 29 years old. 31 people or 8.4% are between 30 and 39, 64 people or 17.3% are between 40 and 49, and 69 people or 18.7% are between 50 and 59. The senior population distribution is 35 people or 9.5% of the population are between 60 and 69 years old, 15 people or 4.1% are between 70 and 79, there are 9 people or 2.4% who are between 80 and 89.

As of 2000, there were 8 homes with 1 or 2 persons in the household, 43 homes with 3 or 4 persons in the household, and 70 homes with 5 or more persons in the household. As of 2000, there were 132 private households (homes and apartments) in the municipality, and an average of 2.8 persons per household. In 2008 there were 85 single family homes (or 58.6% of the total) out of a total of 145 homes and apartments. There was a total of 1 empty apartment for a 0.7% vacancy rate. As of 2007, the construction rate of new housing units was 19.8 new units per 1000 residents.

In the 2007 federal election the most popular party was the SVP which received 30.5% of the vote. The next three most popular parties were the CVP (28.06%), the SP (15.25%) and the FDP (12.98%). In the federal election, a total of 123 votes were cast, and the voter turnout was 47.3%.

The historical population is given in the following table:

Historical population
Year	Pop.	±%
1975	127	—
1980	195	+53.5%
1990	329	+68.7%
2000	375	+14.0%

== Sights ==
The entire village of Unterendingen is designated as part of the Inventory of Swiss Heritage Sites.

== Economy ==
As of 2007, Unterendingen had an unemployment rate of 0.72%. As of 2005, there were 15 people employed in the primary economic sector and about 6 businesses involved in this sector. 15 people are employed in the secondary sector and there are 5 businesses in this sector. 28 people are employed in the tertiary sector, with 11 businesses in this sector.

In 2000 there were 198 workers who lived in the municipality. Of these, 158 or about 79.8% of the residents worked outside Unterendingen while 35 people commuted into the municipality for work. There were a total of 75 jobs (of at least 6 hours per week) in the municipality. Of the working population, 15.2% used public transportation to get to work, and 60.3% used a private car.

== Religion ==
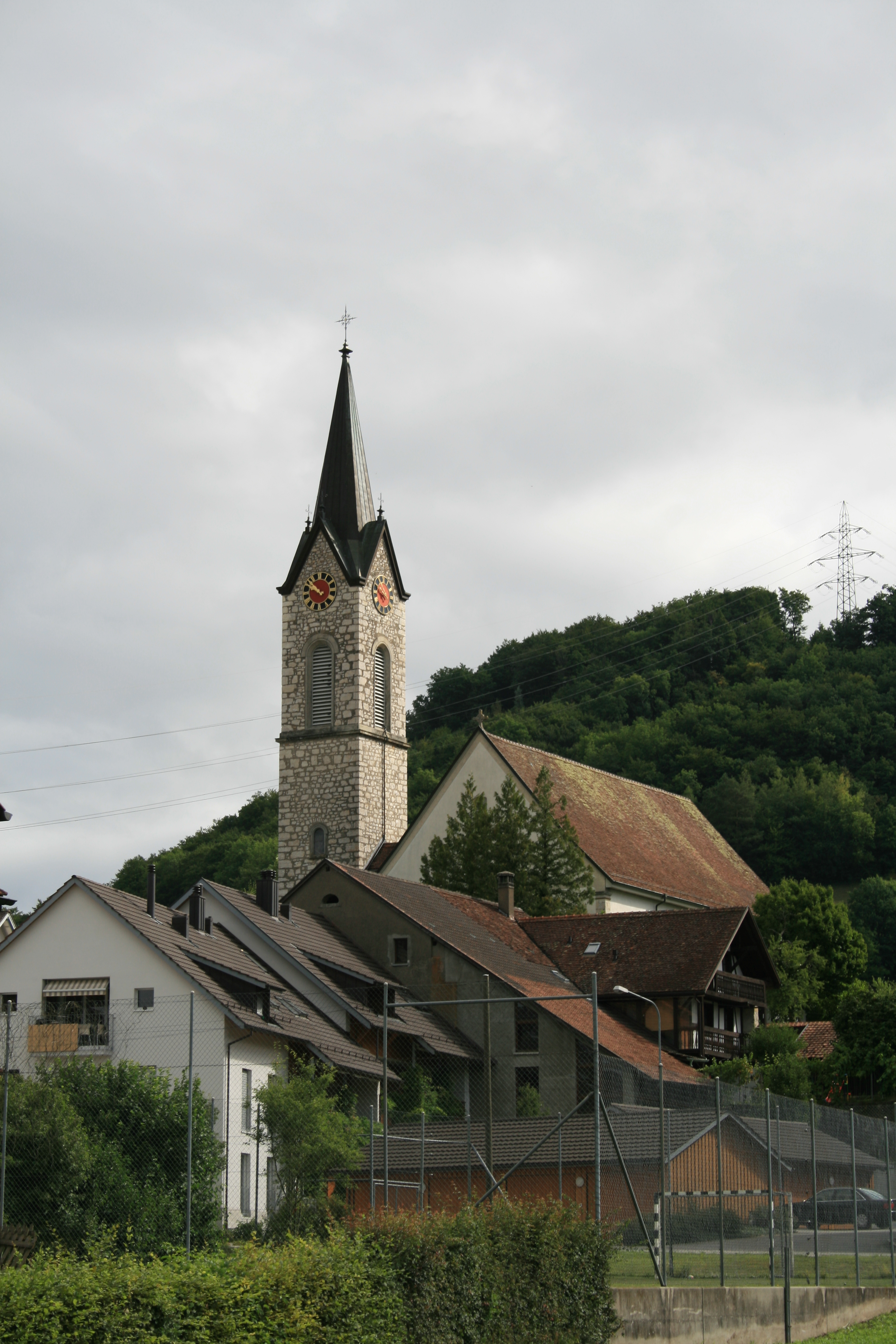
Church of Unterendingen

From the 2000 census, 186 or 50.1% were Roman Catholic, while 128 or 34.5% belonged to the Swiss Reformed Church. Of the rest of the population, there were 2 individuals (or about 0.54% of the population) who belonged to the Christian Catholic faith.

== Education ==
In Unterendingen about 89% of the population (between age 25-64) have completed either non-mandatory upper secondary education or additional higher education (either university or a Fachhochschule). Of the school age population (in the 2008/2009 school year), there are 39 students attending primary school in the municipality.
