= Johann Sulzer =

Johann Sulzer may refer to:

- Johann Georg Sulzer (1720–1779), Swiss mathematician and philosopher
- Johann Heinrich Sulzer (1735–1813), Swiss entomologist
- Johann Jakob Sulzer (1821–1897), Swiss politician
