= Julius Sulzer =

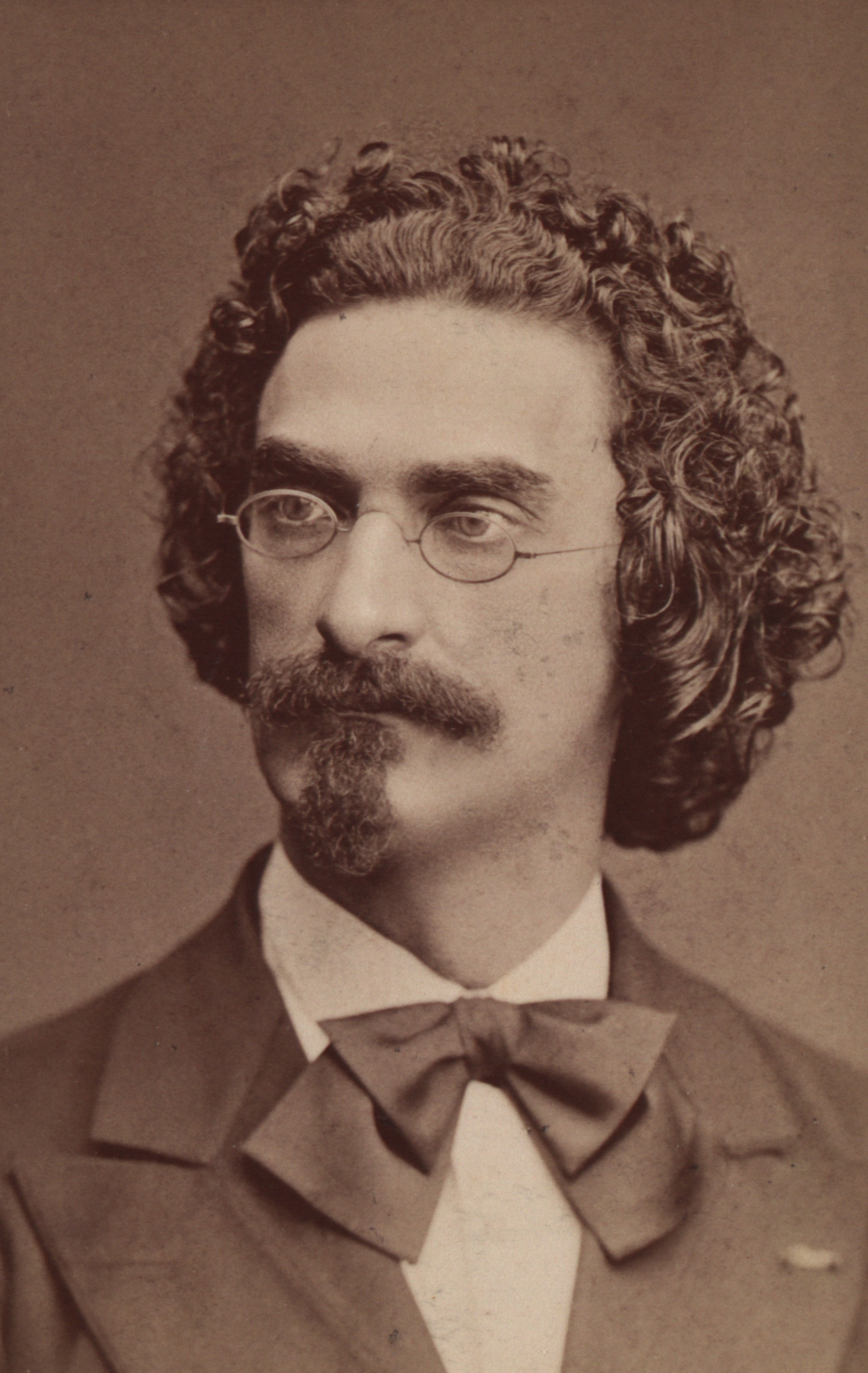
Sulzer, c. 1870 – 1875

Julius Sulzer (26 July 1830 – 13 February 1891) was an Austrian composer and conductor. He directed the orchestra of opera houses in several European cities.

== Life ==
Sulzer was born in 1830, a son of Salomon Sulzer, chief cantor of Vienna. He studied music with his father and with Simon Sechter, and later studied in Italy. In May 1861 a concert entirely of his compositions took place at the Musikverein in Vienna.

He made a concert tour of Europe, and travelled to Constantinople where he gave several concerts, playing before the Sultan. In Prague in 1865 he directed his first opera, Johanna von Neapel, libretto by Otto Prechtler. It was successful, and he became in 1868 the first director of Italian opera in Bucharest. After the first performance there of Gounod's Faust, Prince Karl gave him permission to found a court orchestra.

Commissioned by the Romanian Ministry of Culture to write an opera on a national subject, he composed in 1869 a three-act opera Held Michael ("Michael the Hero"). He soon left Bucharest, invited to be director of opera in 1870 at the Royal Theatre in Turin. In 1871 he performed in the royal opera house in Malta.

During the 1873 Vienna World's Fair, Sulzer directed concerts and operas in the Prater. From 1875 to 1889 he was Kapellmeister at the Hofburgtheater in Vienna. He died in Vienna in 1891.

== Compositions ==
Apart from operas, Sulzer composed orchestral works, piano music and songs.
