= Florence Guggenheim-Grünberg =

Florence Guggenheim-Grünberg (August 30, 1898 Berne, Switzerland – February 14, 1989 Zürich) was a Swiss pharmacist who worked in the field of Yiddish and Jewish history.

== Biography ==
Guggenheim-Grünberg documented Swiss Western Yiddish shortly before its extinction in numerous publications and in sound recordings. She was also active in Swiss Jewish organizations, both nationally and internationally, in the 1930s and 40s. She was president of the Juedische Vereinigung in Zurich in 1950 and the editor of Beiträge zur Geschichte und Volkskunde der Juden in der Schweiz.
