= Endingen, Switzerland =

Endingen
- Municipality
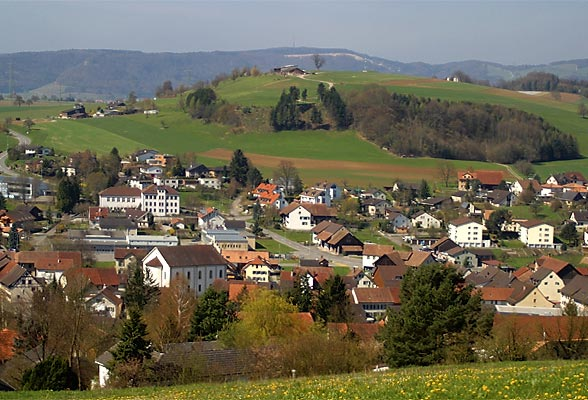

- Flag Coat of arms
- Location of Endingen
- Location within Switzerland Location within Canton of Aargau
- Coordinates: 47°32′N 8°17′E
- Country: Switzerland
- Canton: Aargau
- District: Zurzach

Area
  - Total: 8.46 km^{2} (3.27 sq mi)
- Elevation: 383 m (1,257 ft)

Population (December 2005)
  - Total: 1,842
  - Density: 218/km^{2} (564/sq mi)
- Time zone: UTC+01:00 (CET)
  - Summer (DST): UTC+02:00 (CEST)
- Postal code: 5304
- SFOS number: 4305
- ISO 3166 code: CH-AG
- Surrounded by: Baldingen, Lengnau, Obersiggenthal, Unterendingen, Würenlingen
- Website: www.endingen.ch

Endingen (Swiss Standard German pronunciation: [ˈɛndɪŋən]; Swiss German: [ˈɛndɪgə]) is a municipality in the district of Zurzach in the canton of Aargau in Switzerland.

In the 18th and 19th century, Endingen was one of few villages in which Swiss Jews were permitted to settle. Old buildings in Endingen have two doors – one for Jews and one for Christians. Endigen's synagogue and Jewish cemetery are listed as a heritage site of national significance. Unusually for Swiss villages, there is no Christian church.

On 1 January 2014 the former municipality of Unterendingen merged into the municipality of Endingen.

== History ==
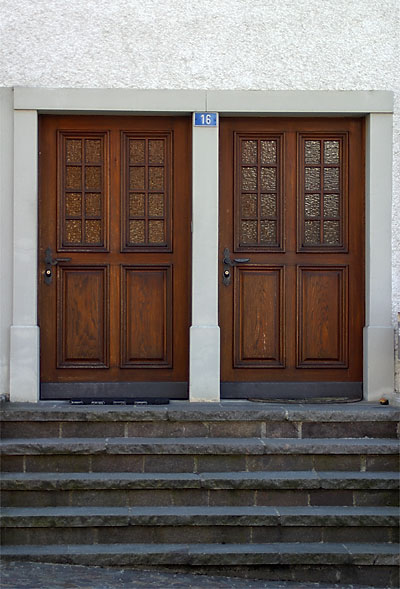
Two separate doors (one for Jews and one for Christians) on a house in Endingen

Individual items from the Neolithic and Bronze Age have been discovered around Endingen. In the Early Middle Ages the Alamanni settled in the area. The modern village of Endingen is first mentioned in 798 as Entingas. Until 1945 it was known as Oberendingen. During the High Middle Ages the major landholders in village included Regensberg, the Bishop of Constance, the Freiherr of Tegerfelden and the lords of Endingen. Starting in the 13th century the village was under the Habsburgs. After the conquest of the Aargau in 1415 by the Swiss Confederation it was part of the high court of the bailiff of Baden. The low court rights lay with Sankt Blasien Abbey in the Black Forest. The land herrschaft rights were held by a number of different owners.

In accordance with the resolution of the Tagsatzung in 1678, Jews were allowed to settle in the communities of the Surb valley. After 1776, they were further restricted to living in only Endingen and Lengnau. This immigration slowly but steadily changed the appearance of the community. The village never built a Christian church, only a Jewish synagogue. The local Christians traveled to neighboring villages for church. The Jewish and Christian families are often under one roof. In the middle of the 19th century the village had about 2,000 inhabitants, about half Jews and half Christians. By comparison, the town of Baden had about 1,500 people at the same time. The Jewish population was fairly well tolerated (except for the Zwetschgenkrieg or "plum war" riots in 1802), self-managed and maintained its own school. In 1879 a Jewish village of Neu-Endingen was built. It remained mostly independent until 1983 when it merged back into the village of Endingen.

Aerial view (1958)

However, even though they were nearly a majority in Endingen, the Jewish residents were only allowed to enter a few professions, such as trade. Houses were built with two separate entrances, one for Jews and one for Christians. They were under the high and low courts of the Baden bailiff and had to buy "protection and safety" letters from the authorities. It wasn't until 1876 that Jews were granted full equality in civil rights and allowed to travel. By 1920, most Jews had left the community.

Since 1661, the Catholics in Endingen have been part of the parish of Unterendingen (previously Zurzach), while the Reformed members are part of the Tegerfelden parish. The only house of worship is the synagogue of Endingen. It was built in 1764 and rebuilt in 1852.

=== Plum war ===
In 1798, the French invaded Switzerland and set up the Helvetic Republic. The Republic attempted to modernize and centralize the Swiss Confederation. As part of this new, liberal state, Swiss reformers attempted to enforce the emancipation of the Jews in the new central Swiss Parliament in Aarau. When that failed, they attempted to get the French to force this change on the new Swiss government. The changes of the Republic were not embraced by many of the Swiss and the issue of emancipation for the Jews became another contentious issue between the old order and the new government. Finally in 1802 the population revolted and turned against the Jews. The mob looted the Jewish villages of Endingen and Lengnau. At the same time other revolts, such as the Stecklikrieg, stretched the French Army too far. Napoleon Bonaparte lacked the troops to bring peace to Switzerland, and also he needed the Swiss regiments for his campaigns. Seeking a peaceful resolution to the uprising, in 1803 he issued the Act of Mediation. The Act of Mediation was a compromise between the Ancien Regime and a Republic. One of the compromises in the Act was that no further rights were granted to the Jews.

== Geography ==
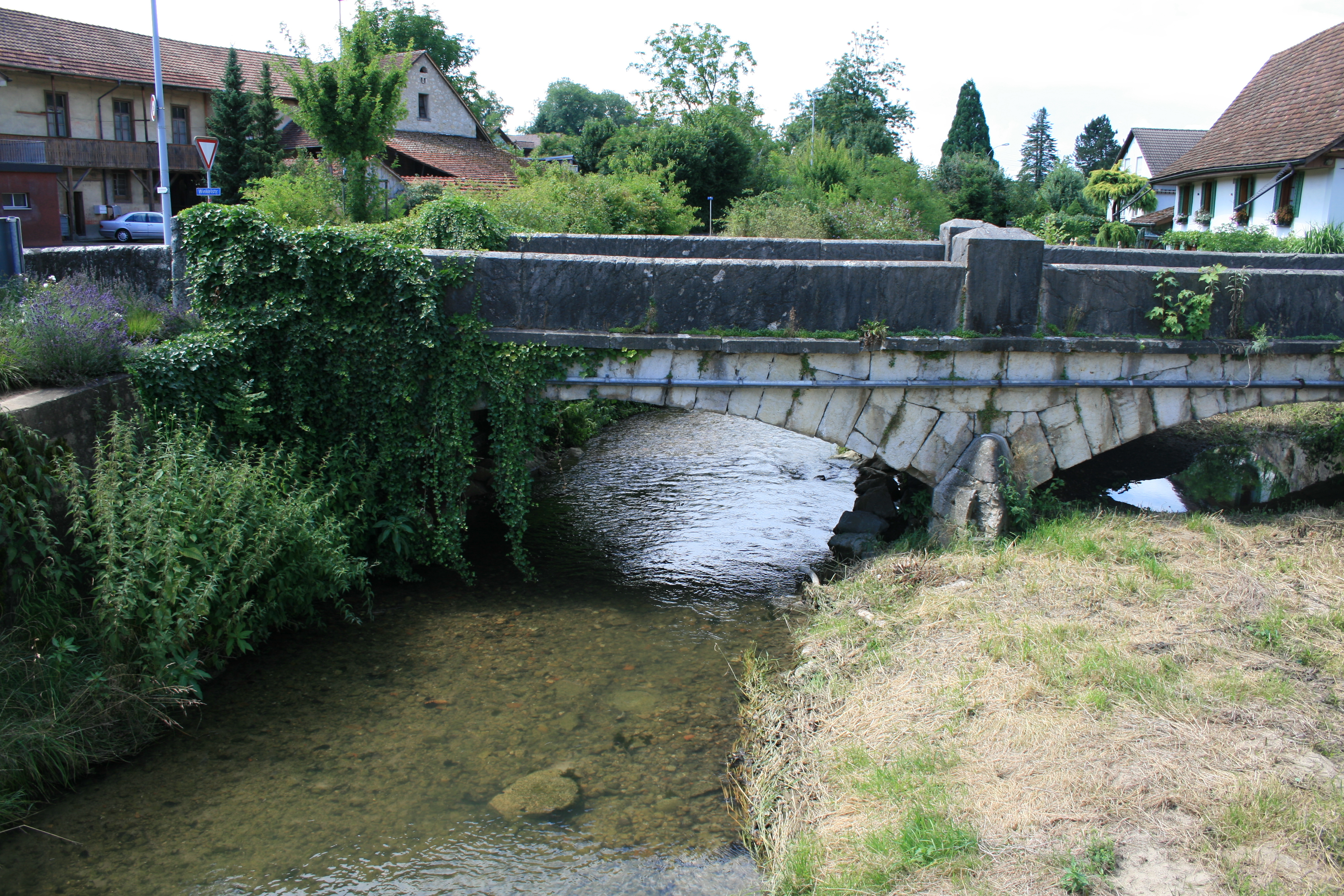
Surb river in Endingen

Endingen has an area, as of 2009, of 8.46 square kilometers (3.27 sq mi). Of this area, 3.8 km^{2} (1.5 sq mi) or 44.9% is used for agricultural purposes, while 3.84 km^{2} (1.48 sq mi) or 45.4% is forested. Of the rest of the land, 0.77 km^{2} (0.30 sq mi) or 9.1% is settled (buildings or roads), 0.03 km^{2} (7.4 acres) or 0.4% is either rivers or lakes.

Of the built up area, housing and buildings made up 5.8% and transportation infrastructure made up 2.4%. Out of the forested land, 43.7% of the total land area is heavily forested and 1.7% is covered with orchards or small clusters of trees. Of the agricultural land, 27.4% is used for growing crops and 14.2% is pastures, while 3.3% is used for orchards or vine crops. All the water in the municipality is flowing water.

The municipality is located in the Zurzach district, in the Surb river valley. It consists of the haufendorf village (an irregular, unplanned and quite closely packed village, built around a central square) of Endingen and the hamlet of Loohof.

== Coat of arms ==
The blazon of the municipal coat of arms is Per pale Argent a Fleur-de-lis mediated Gules and Or.

== Demographics ==
Endingen has a population (as of December 2020) of 2,597. As of June 2009, 14.9% of the population are foreign nationals. Over the last 10 years (1997–2007) the population has changed at a rate of 10.2%. Most of the population (as of 2000) speaks German (92.9%), with Albanian being second most common ( 2.4%) and French being third ( 1.2%).

The age distribution, as of 2008, in Endingen is; 244 children or 12.5% of the population are between 0 and 9 years old and 231 teenagers or 11.8% are between 10 and 19. Of the adult population, 217 people or 11.1% of the population are between 20 and 29 years old. 267 people or 13.6% are between 30 and 39, 330 people or 16.9% are between 40 and 49, and 247 people or 12.6% are between 50 and 59. The senior population distribution is 220 people or 11.2% of the population are between 60 and 69 years old, 133 people or 6.8% are between 70 and 79, there are 61 people or 3.1% who are between 80 and 89, and there are 7 people or 0.4% who are 90 and older.

As of 2000 the average number of residents per living room was 0.56 which is about equal to the cantonal average of 0.57 per room. In this case, a room is defined as space of a housing unit of at least 4 m^{2} (43 sq ft) as normal bedrooms, dining rooms, living rooms, kitchens and habitable cellars and attics. About 58.7% of the total households were owner occupied, or in other words did not pay rent (though they may have a mortgage or a rent-to-own agreement).

As of 2000, there were 46 homes with 1 or 2 persons in the household, 315 homes with 3 or 4 persons in the household, and 322 homes with 5 or more persons in the household. As of 2000, there were 699 private households (homes and apartments) in the municipality, and an average of 2.5 persons per household. In 2008 there were 377 single family homes (or 46.0% of the total) out of a total of 819 homes and apartments. There were a total of 0 empty apartments for a 0.0% vacancy rate. As of 2007, the construction rate of new housing units was 7.3 new units per 1000 residents.

In the 2007 federal election the most popular party was the SVP which received 32.53% of the vote. The next three most popular parties were the CVP (25.45%), the SP (16.3%) and the FDP (11.3%). In the federal election, a total of 792 votes were cast, and the voter turnout was 59.0%.

== Historic population ==
The historical population is given in the following chart:

== Heritage sites of national significance ==
The Jewish cemetery on Hauptstrasse and the Synagogue on Hintersieg are listed as Swiss heritage sites of national significance. The entire village of Unterendingen is designated as part of the Inventory of Swiss Heritage Sites. The entire village of Endingen is designated as part of the Inventory of Swiss Heritage Sites.

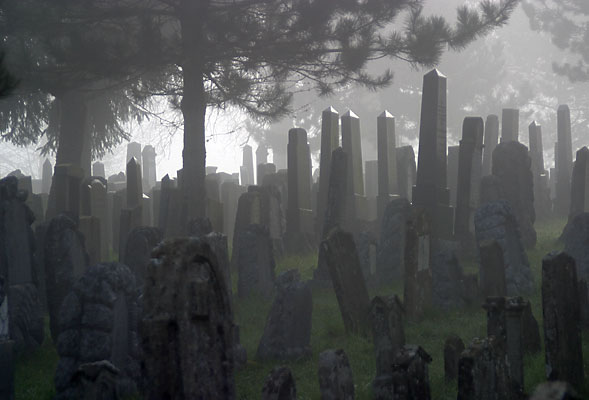
Jewish Cemetery

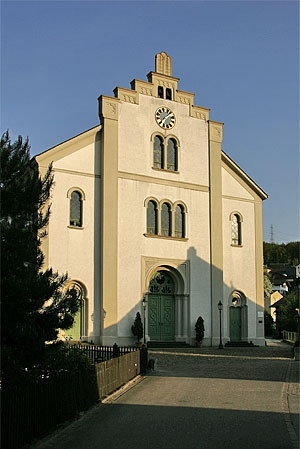
Synagogue of Endingen

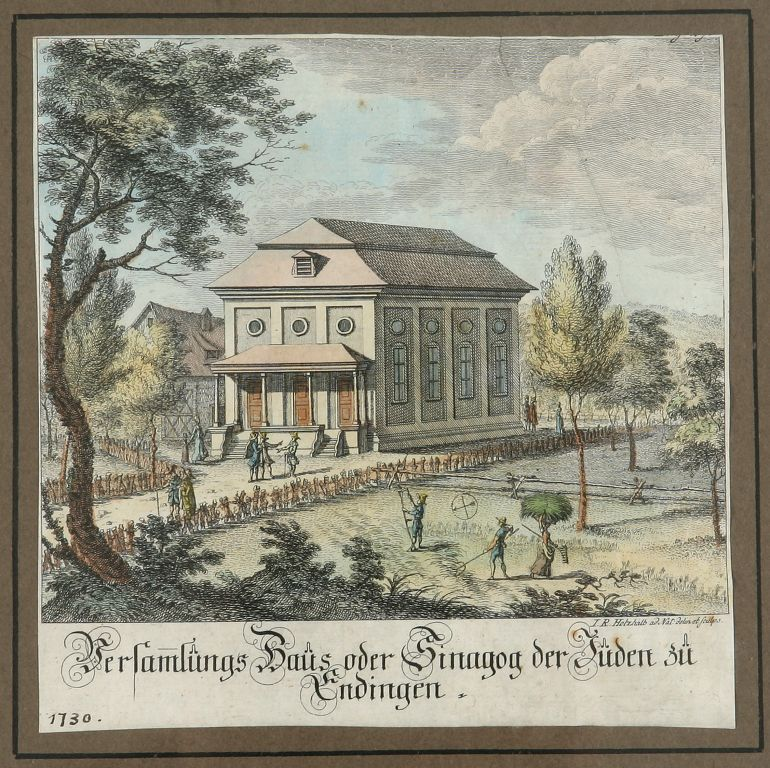
18th century copperplate etching of the Endingen synagogue. In the Jewish Museum of Switzerland's collection.

== Economy ==
As of 2007, Endingen had an unemployment rate of 1.44%. As of 2005, there were 92 people employed in the primary economic sector and about 34 businesses involved in this sector. 184 people are employed in the secondary sector and there are 21 businesses in this sector. 263 people are employed in the tertiary sector, with 50 businesses in this sector.

In 2000 there were 942 workers who lived in the municipality. Of these, 694 or about 73.7% of the residents worked outside Endingen while 239 people commuted into the municipality for work. There were a total of 487 jobs (of at least 6 hours per week) in the municipality. Of the working population, 12.3% used public transportation to get to work, and 52.6% used a private car.

== Religion ==
From the 2000 census, 911 or 51.6% were Roman Catholic, while 563 or 31.9% belonged to the Swiss Reformed Church. Of the rest of the population, there were 4 individuals (or about 0.23% of the population) who belonged to the Christian Catholic faith.

== Education ==
The entire Swiss population is generally well educated. In Endingen about 82.3% of the population (between age 25 and 64) have completed either non-mandatory upper secondary education or additional higher education (either university or a Fachhochschule). Of the school age population (in the 2008/2009 school year), there are 148 students attending primary school, there are 297 students attending tertiary or university level schooling in the municipality.
