= Rekingen AG railway station =

Railway station in Switzerland

Rekingen AG
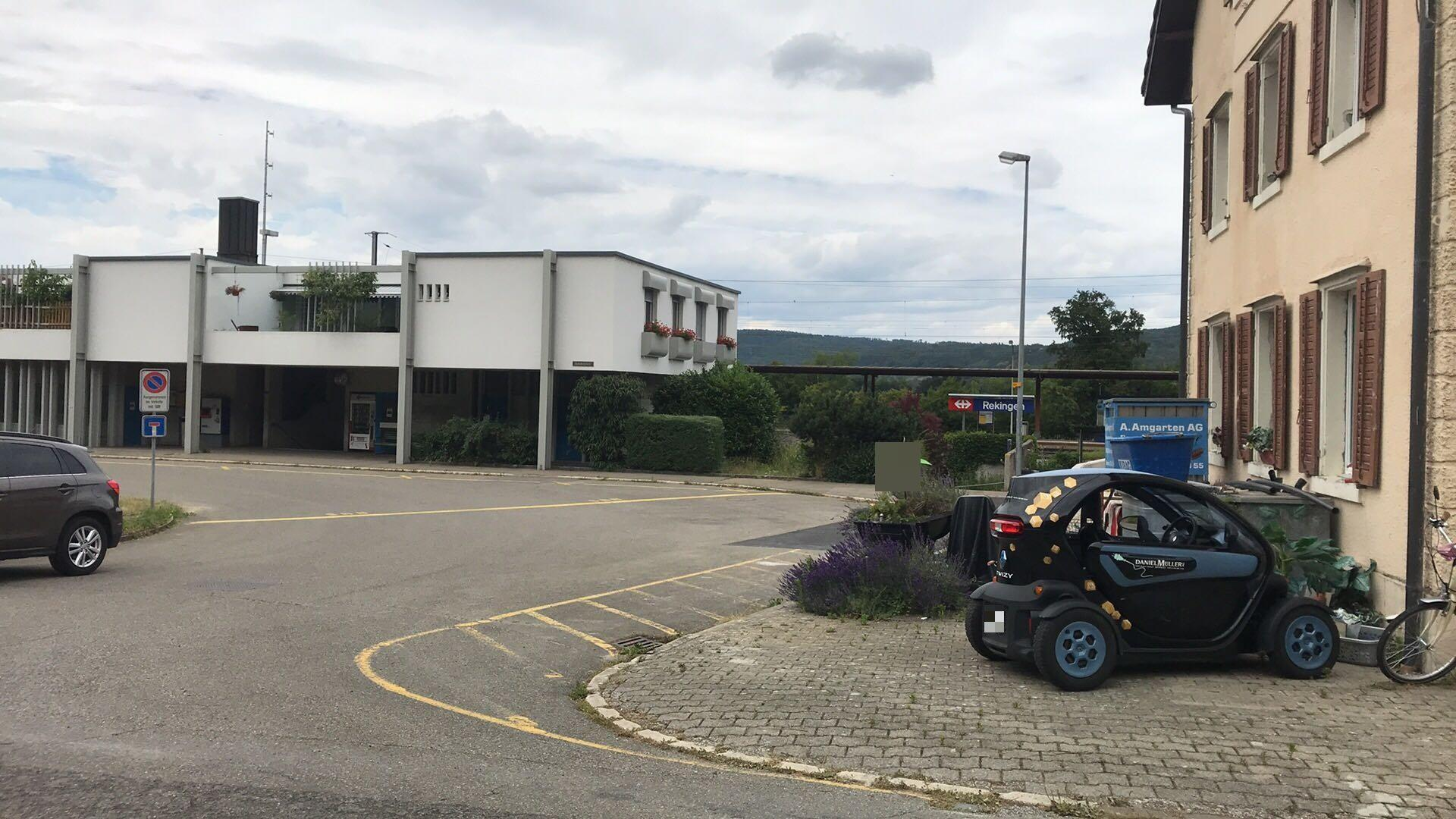
- The station in 2018

General information
- Location: Bahnhofplatz; Rekingen, Aargau; Switzerland
- Coordinates: 47°34′12″N 8°19′38″E
- Elevation: 338 m (1,109 ft)
- Owner: Swiss Federal Railways
- Line: Winterthur–Bülach–Koblenz line
- Distance: 38.1 km (23.7 mi) from Winterthur
- Platforms: 1 island platform
- Tracks: 2
- Train operators: THURBO

Other information
- Fare zone: 562 (A-Welle)

Passengers
- 2018: 200 per working day

Services
Preceding station	Zurich S-Bahn	Following station
Bad Zurzach towards Waldshut	S36	Mellikon towards Bülach
Location

Rekingen AG railway station (German: Bahnhof Rekingen AG) is a railway station in the Swiss canton of Aargau and municipality of Rekingen. The station is located on the Winterthur to Koblenz line of Swiss Federal Railways.

== Services ==
As of the December 2020 timetable change, the following services stop at Rekingen AG:

- Zürich S-Bahn S36: hourly service between Waldshut and Bülach.
