= Koblenz Dorf railway station =

Railway station in Switzerland

Koblenz Dorf
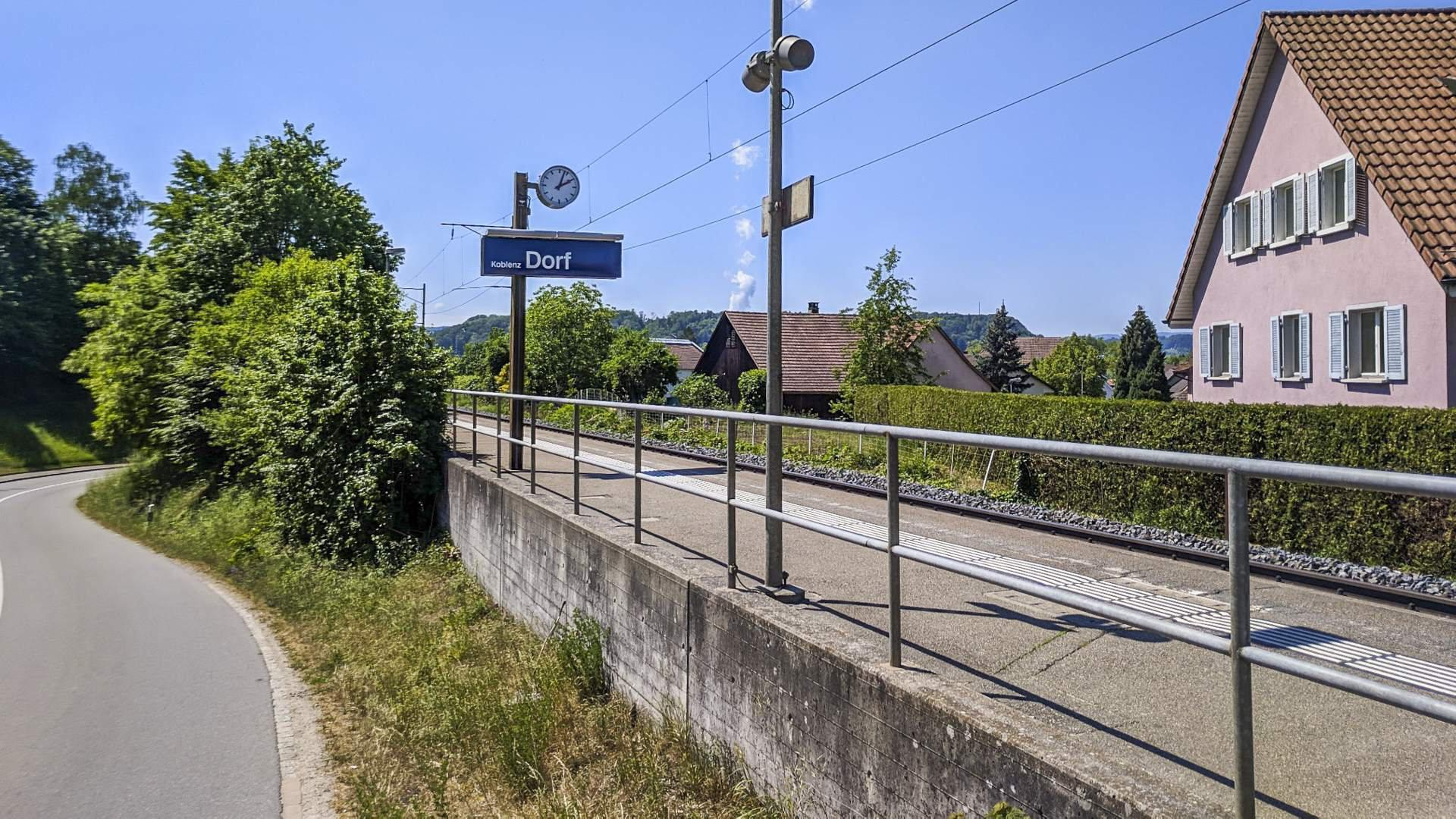
- The station platform in 2018

General information
- Location: Achenbergstrasse; Koblenz, Aargau; Switzerland
- Coordinates: 47°36′34″N 8°14′25″E
- Elevation: 324 m (1,063 ft)
- Owner: Swiss Federal Railways
- Line: Winterthur–Bülach–Koblenz line
- Distance: 46.9 km (29.1 mi) from Winterthur
- Platforms: 1 side platform
- Tracks: 1
- Train operators: Swiss Federal Railways; THURBO

Other information
- Fare zone: 563 (A-Welle)

Passengers
- 2018: 490 per working day

Services
Preceding station	Aargau S-Bahn	Following station
Koblenz towards Baden	S27	Rietheim towards Bad Zurzach
Preceding station	Zurich S-Bahn	Following station
Koblenz towards Waldshut	S36	Rietheim towards Bülach
Location

Koblenz Dorf railway station (German: Bahnhof Koblenz Dorf) is a railway station in the Swiss canton of Aargau and municipality of Koblenz. The station is located on the Winterthur to Koblenz line of Swiss Federal Railways.

Koblenz Dorf station should not be confused with Koblenz station, which is situated rather further from the centre of Koblenz. Koblenz station is served by the same trains that serve Koblenz Dorf station, with the addition of further S27 trains between Baden and Waldshut.

== Services ==
As of the December 2020 timetable change, the following services stop at Koblenz Dorf:

- Aargau S-Bahn S27 / Zürich S-Bahn S36: half-hourly service between Waldshut and Bad Zurzach and hourly service to Bülach and Baden.
