= Mellikon =

- Municipality
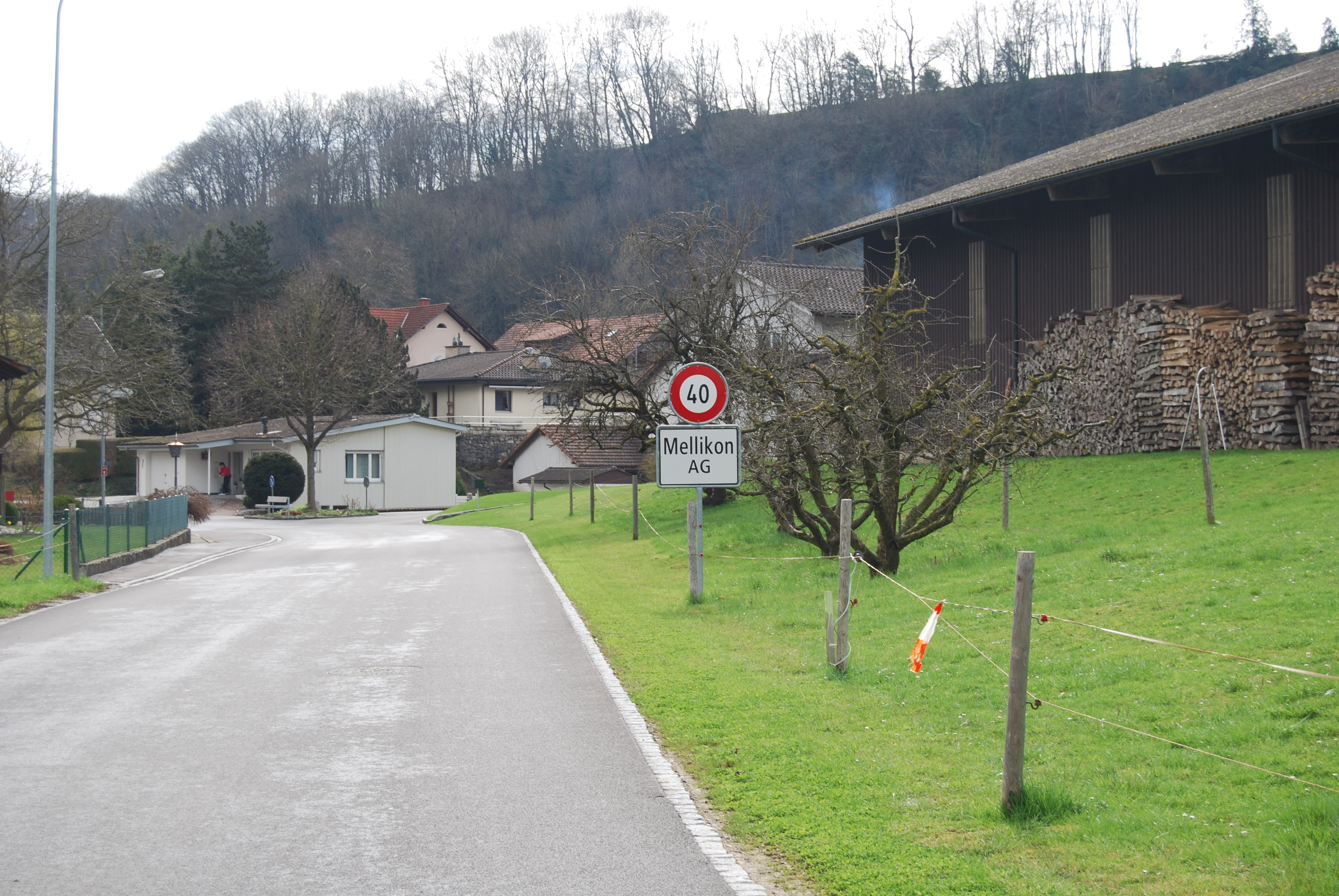

- Flag Coat of arms
- Location of Mellikon
- Location within Switzerland Location within Canton of Aargau
- Coordinates: 47°34′N 8°21′E
- Country: Switzerland
- Canton: Aargau
- District: Zurzach

Area
  - Total: 2.71 km^{2} (1.05 sq mi)
- Elevation: 357 m (1,171 ft)

Population (December 2005)
  - Total: 255
  - Density: 94.1/km^{2} (244/sq mi)
- Time zone: UTC+01:00 (CET)
  - Summer (DST): UTC+02:00 (CEST)
- Postal code: 5465
- SFOS number: 4314
- ISO 3166 code: CH-AG
- Surrounded by: Böbikon, Hohentengen am Hochrhein (DE-BW), Küssaberg (DE-BW), Rekingen, Rümikon, Wislikofen
- Website: www.mellikon.ch

Mellikon is a village and municipality in the district of Zurzach in the canton of Aargau in Switzerland.

== History ==
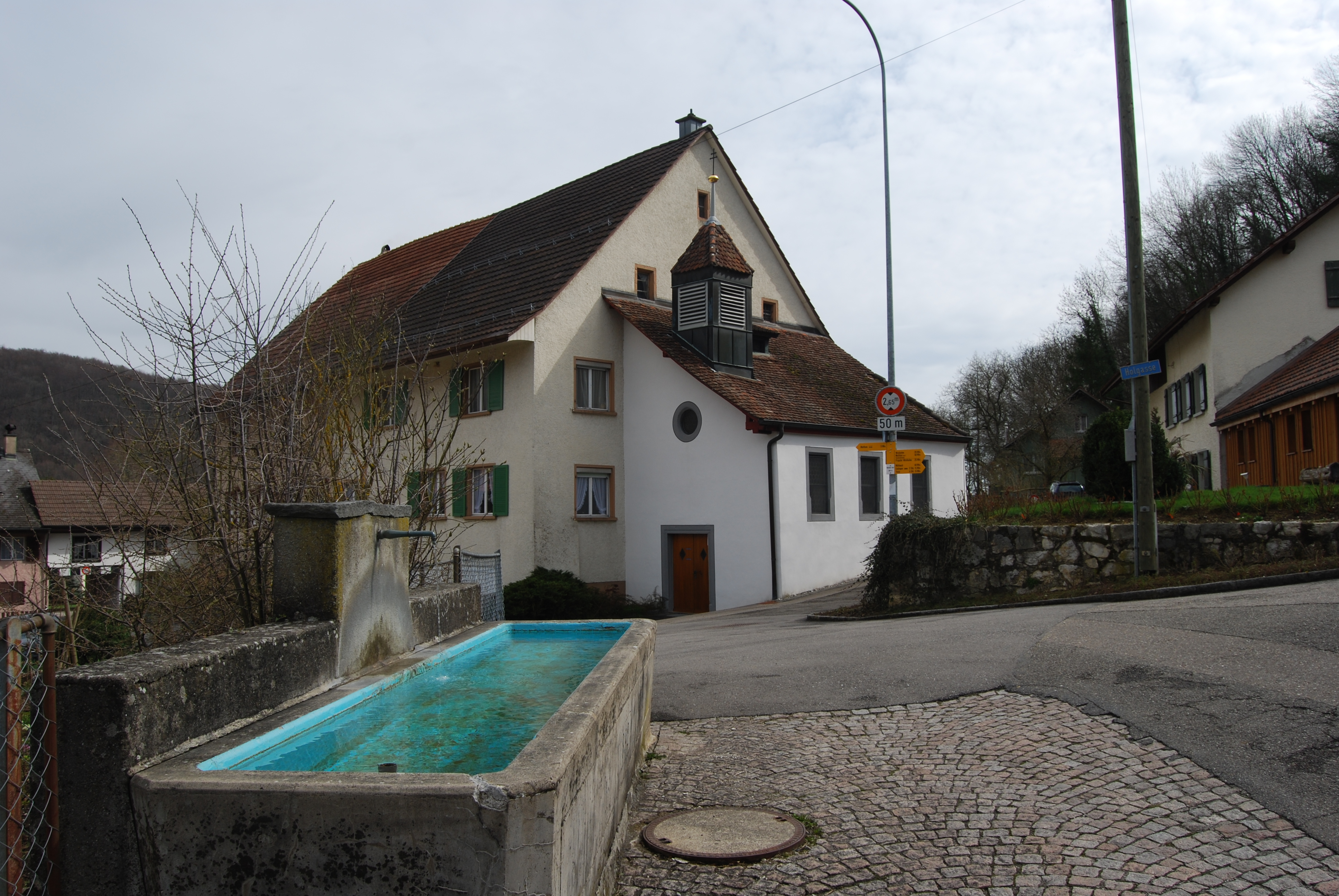
Chapel in Mellikon

Mellikon is first mentioned in 1113 as Meliken. The village developed from a farm owned by Zurzach Abbey, but it was only recognized by the Abbey as a municipality in 1661. During the Protestant Reformation, the majority of the population in Mellikon joined the new religion. The Reformed members belonged to the parish of Zurzach, while the Catholic members belonged to the Catholic parish of Zurzach. In 1645 Jost von Roll from Uri built a mansion and Catholic chapel in Mellikon. It still serves as a place of worship and cemetery for the von Roll family. The limestone quarry in the village was used into the 1980s by the Schweiz Sodafabrik and then in the 1990s by the Mellikon AG company. Starting in 1990, an industrial and business park was built west of the village. In 1995, the village was tied into the Swiss Federal Railways Rhine Valley line. The majority of the population is employed outside the village.

== Geography ==
Mellikon has an area, as of 2009, of 2.71 square kilometers (1.05 sq mi). Of this area, 0.74 km^{2} (0.29 sq mi) or 27.3% is used for agricultural purposes, while 1.36 km^{2} (0.53 sq mi) or 50.2% is forested. Of the rest of the land, 0.48 km^{2} (0.19 sq mi) or 17.7% is settled (buildings or roads), 0.11 km^{2} (27 acres) or 4.1% is either rivers or lakes.

Of the built up area, industrial buildings made up 3.0% of the total area while housing and buildings made up 1.5% and transportation infrastructure made up 4.4%. Power and water infrastructure as well as other special developed areas made up 8.5% of the area Out of the forested land, 49.1% of the total land area is heavily forested and 1.1% is covered with orchards or small clusters of trees. Of the agricultural land, 17.7% is used for growing crops and 8.9% is pastures. All the water in the municipality is flowing water.

The village is located in the Zurzach district, in a small valley east of the Nurren river in the Rhine valley. It consists of the haufendorf village (an irregular, unplanned and quite closely packed village, built around a central square) of Mellikon.

== Coat of arms ==
The blazon of the municipal coat of arms is Gules a Ploughshare Argent.

== Demographics ==
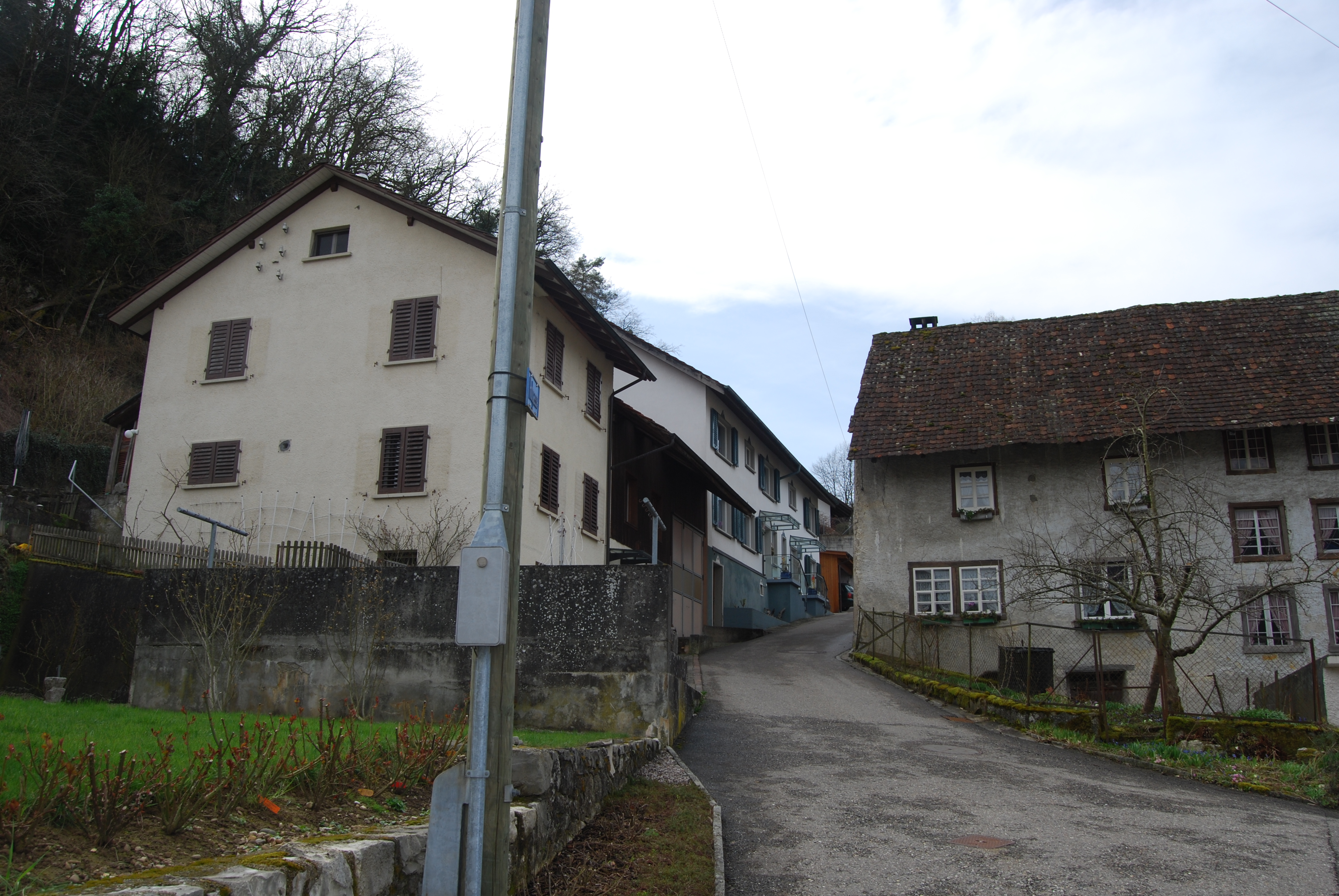
Houses in Mellikon

Mellikon has a population (as of December 2020) of 228 As of 2008, 44.4% of the population are foreign nationals. Over the last 10 years (1997–2007) the population has changed at a rate of -6.7%. Most of the population (as of 2000) speaks German(93.0%), with Portuguese being second most common ( 3.1%) and Dutch being third ( 1.2%).

As of 2008, the gender distribution of the population was 49.4% male and 50.6% female. The population was made up of 108 Swiss men (43.7% of the population), and 14 (5.7%) non-Swiss men. There were 112 Swiss women (45.3%), and 13 (5.3%) non-Swiss women. In 2008 there were 2 live births to Swiss citizens and 1 death. Ignoring immigration and emigration, the population of Swiss citizens increased by 1 while the foreign population remained the same. There were 1 Swiss man who immigrated from another country back to Switzerland. The total Swiss population change in 2008 was a decrease of 6 and the non-Swiss population change was an increase of 4 people. This represents a population growth rate of -0.8%.

The age distribution, as of 2008, in Mellikon is; 22 children or 8.8% of the population are between 0 and 9 years old and 39 teenagers or 15.5% are between 10 and 19. Of the adult population, 21 people or 8.4% of the population are between 20 and 29 years old. 18 people or 7.2% are between 30 and 39, 46 people or 18.3% are between 40 and 49, and 49 people or 19.5% are between 50 and 59. The senior population distribution is 28 people or 11.2% of the population are between 60 and 69 years old, 12 people or 4.8% are between 70 and 79, there are 15 people or 6.0% who are between 80 and 89, and there is 1 person who is 90 or older.

As of 2000 the average number of residents per living room was 0.54 which is about equal to the cantonal average of 0.57 per room. In this case, a room is defined as space of a housing unit of at least 4 m^{2} (43 sq ft) as normal bedrooms, dining rooms, living rooms, kitchens and habitable cellars and attics. About 71.1% of the total households were owner occupied, or in other words did not pay rent (though they may have a mortgage or a rent-to-own agreement).

As of 2000, there were 3 homes with 1 or 2 persons in the household, 26 homes with 3 or 4 persons in the household, and 61 homes with 5 or more persons in the household. As of 2000, there were 96 private households (homes and apartments) in the municipality, and an average of 2.6 persons per household. In 2008 there were 65 single family homes (or 67.0% of the total) out of a total of 97 homes and apartments. There were a total of 5 empty apartments for a 5.2% vacancy rate. As of 2007, the construction rate of new housing units was 0 new units per 1000 residents.

In the 2007 federal election the most popular party was the SVP which received 32.55% of the vote. The next three most popular parties were the Green Party (19.44%), the SP (16.88%) and the CVP (16.5%). In the federal election, a total of 94 votes were cast, and the voter turnout was 50.8%.

The historical population is given in the following table:

Historical population
Year	Pop.	±%
1850	199	—
1900	143	−28.1%
1950	220	+53.8%
1980	197	−10.5%
1990	240	+21.8%
2000	257	+7.1%

== Economy ==
As of 2007, Mellikon had an unemployment rate of 2.08%. As of 2005, there were 12 people employed in the primary economic sector and about 4 businesses involved in this sector. 105 people are employed in the secondary sector and there are 6 businesses in this sector. 34 people are employed in the tertiary sector, with 10 businesses in this sector.

In 2000 there were 113 workers who lived in the municipality. Of these, 79 or about 69.9% of the residents worked outside Mellikon while 80 people commuted into the municipality for work. There were a total of 114 jobs (of at least 6 hours per week) in the municipality. Of the working population, 19% used public transportation to get to work, and 45.7% used a private car.

== Religion ==
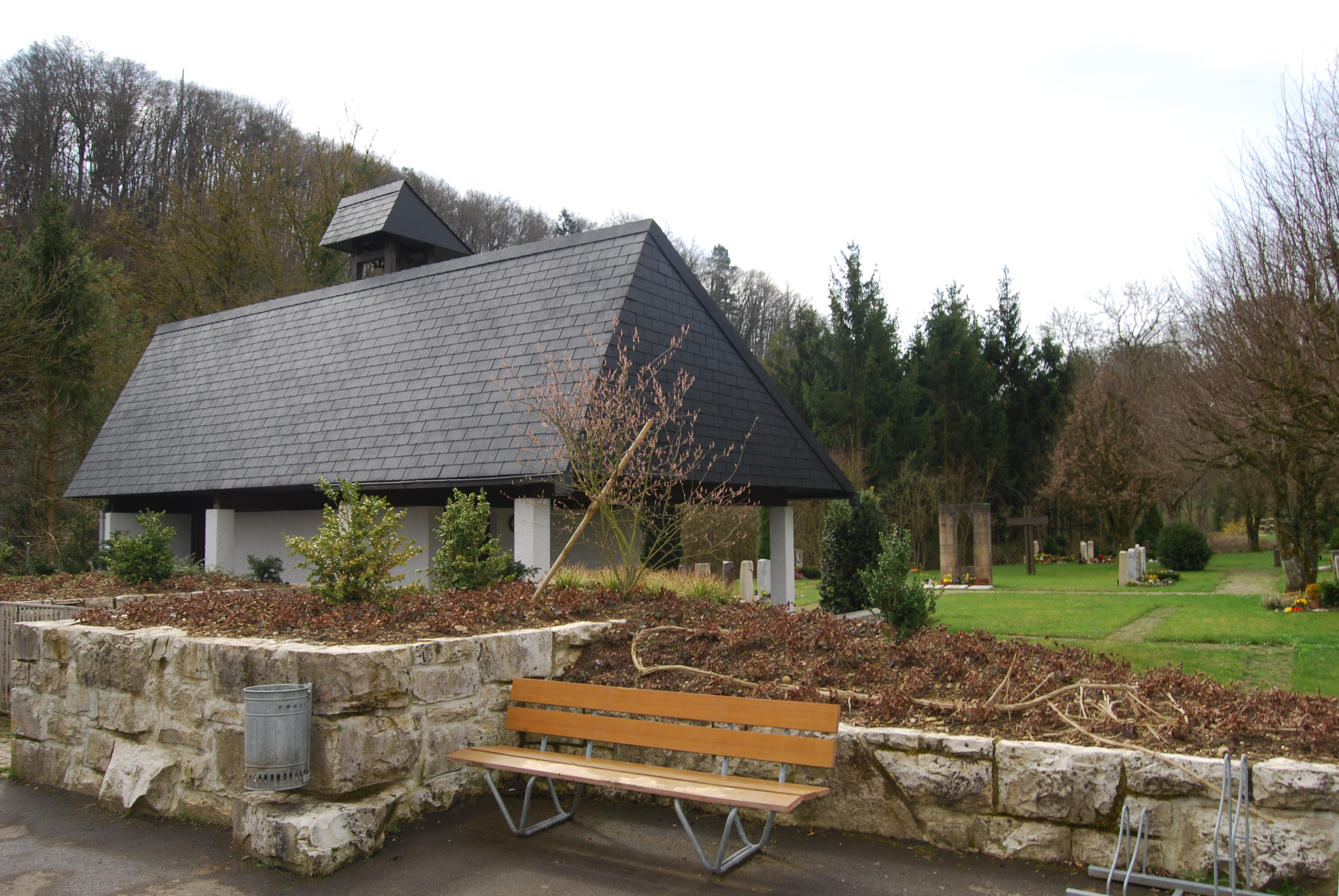
Mellikon cemetery

From the 2000 census, 121 or 47.1% were Roman Catholic, while 86 or 33.5% belonged to the Swiss Reformed Church.

== Education ==
In Mellikon about 75.6% of the population (between age 25-64) have completed either non-mandatory upper secondary education or additional higher education (either university or a Fachhochschule). Of the school age population (in the 2008/2009 school year) in the municipality.

== Transport ==
Mellikon railway station is served by Zurich S-Bahn line S36, which links Bülach and Waldshut.
