= Kaiserstuhl AG railway station =

Railway station in Switzerland

Kaiserstuhl AG
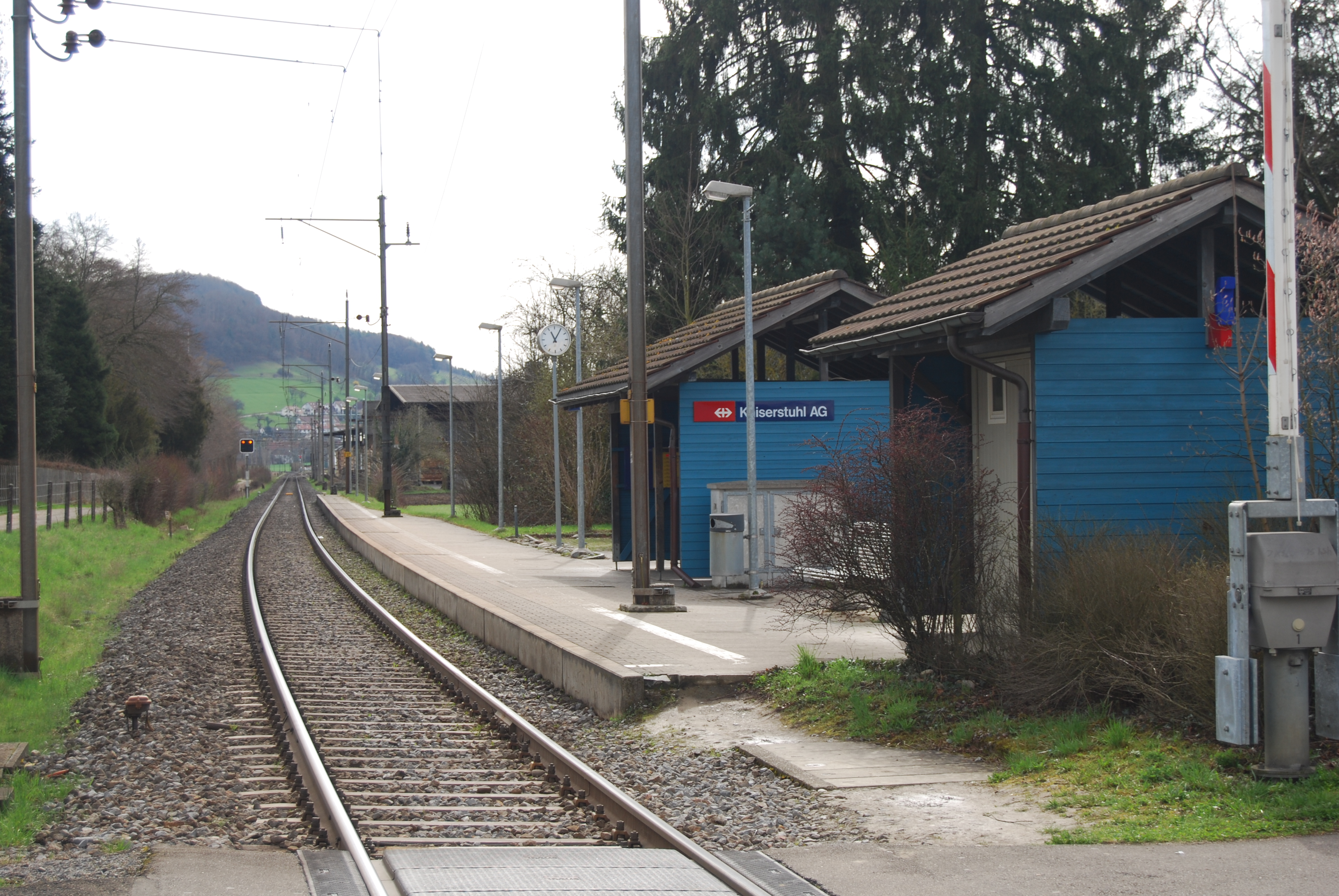
- The station platform in 2010

General information
- Location: Bahnhofstrasse; Kaiserstuhl, Aargau; Switzerland
- Coordinates: 47°33′59″N 8°25′09″E
- Elevation: 368 m (1,207 ft)
- Owner: Swiss Federal Railways
- Line: Winterthur–Bülach–Koblenz line
- Distance: 30.2 km (18.8 mi) from Winterthur
- Platforms: 1 side platform
- Tracks: 1
- Train operators: THURBO
- Connections: PostAuto Schweiz bus lines

Other information
- Fare zone: 562 (A-Welle); 118 (ZVV)

Passengers
- 2018: 260 per working day

Services
Preceding station	Zurich S-Bahn	Following station
Rümikon AG towards Waldshut	S36	Zweidlen towards Bülach
Location

Kaiserstuhl AG railway station (German: Bahnhof Kaiserstuhl AG) is a railway station in the Swiss canton of Aargau and municipality of Kaiserstuhl. The station is located on the Winterthur to Koblenz line of Swiss Federal Railways and is served by Zurich S-Bahn line S36. The ZVV busline 515 connects Kaiserstuhl with Bülach as well.

== Services ==
As of the December 2020 timetable change, the following services stop at Kaiserstuhl AG:

- Zürich S-Bahn S36: hourly service between Waldshut and Bülach.
