= Mellikon railway station =

Railway station in Switzerland

Mellikon
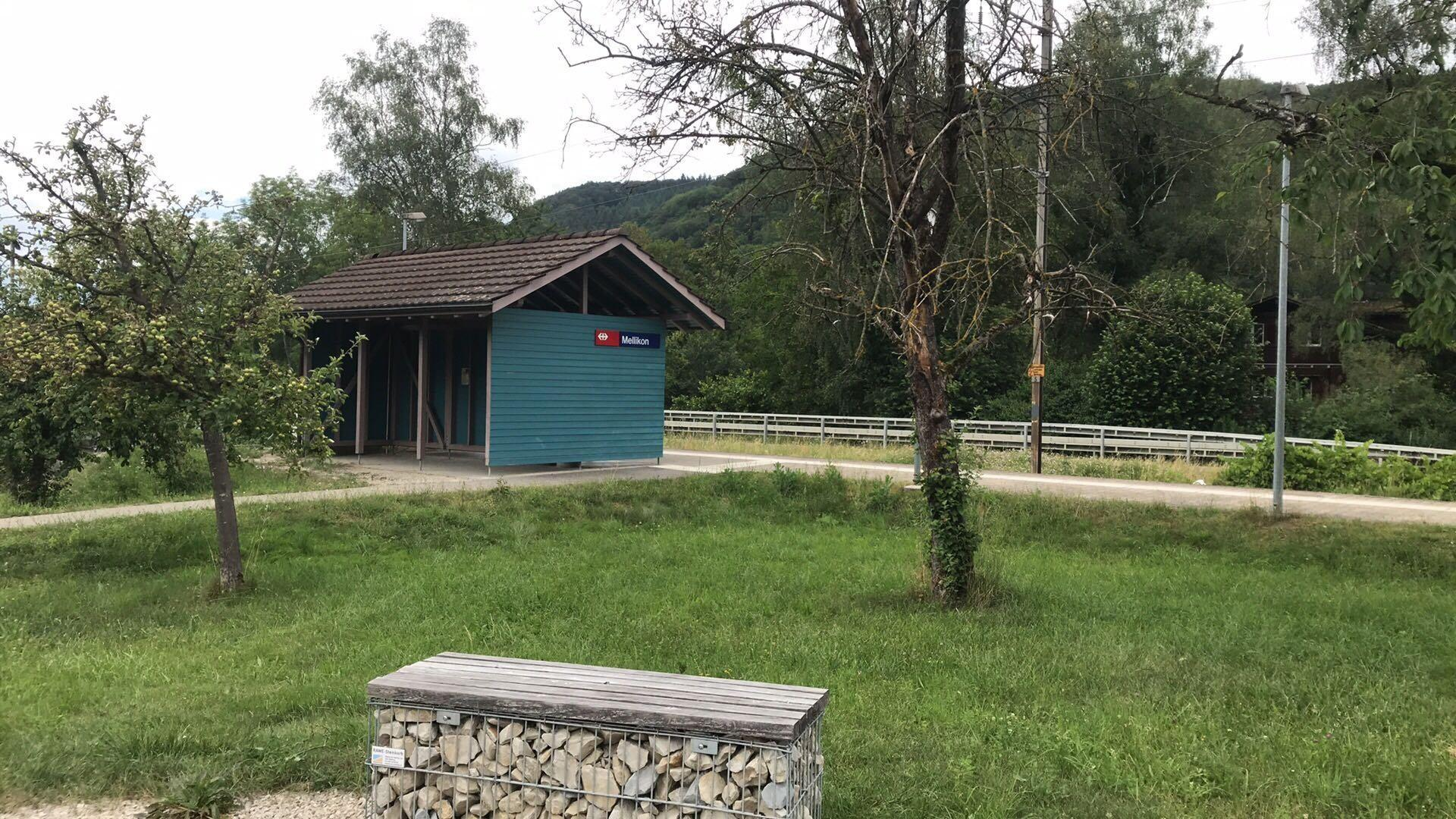
- The station platform in 2018

General information
- Location: Mellikon, Aargau; Switzerland
- Coordinates: 47°34′07″N 8°21′09″E
- Elevation: 348 m (1,142 ft)
- Owner: Swiss Federal Railways
- Line: Winterthur–Bülach–Koblenz line
- Distance: 36.2 km (22.5 mi) from Winterthur
- Platforms: 1 side platform
- Tracks: 1
- Train operators: THURBO

Other information
- Fare zone: 562 (A-Welle)

Passengers
- 2018: 60 per working day

Services
Preceding station	Zurich S-Bahn	Following station
Rekingen AG towards Waldshut	S36	Rümikon AG towards Bülach
Location

Mellikon railway station (German: Bahnhof Mellikon) is a railway station in the Swiss canton of Aargau and municipality of Mellikon. The station is located on the Winterthur to Koblenz line of Swiss Federal Railways.

== Services ==
As of the December 2020 timetable change, the following services stop at Mellikon:

- Zürich S-Bahn S36: hourly service between Waldshut and Bülach.
