= Rietheim railway station =

Railway station in Rietheim, Switzerland

Rietheim
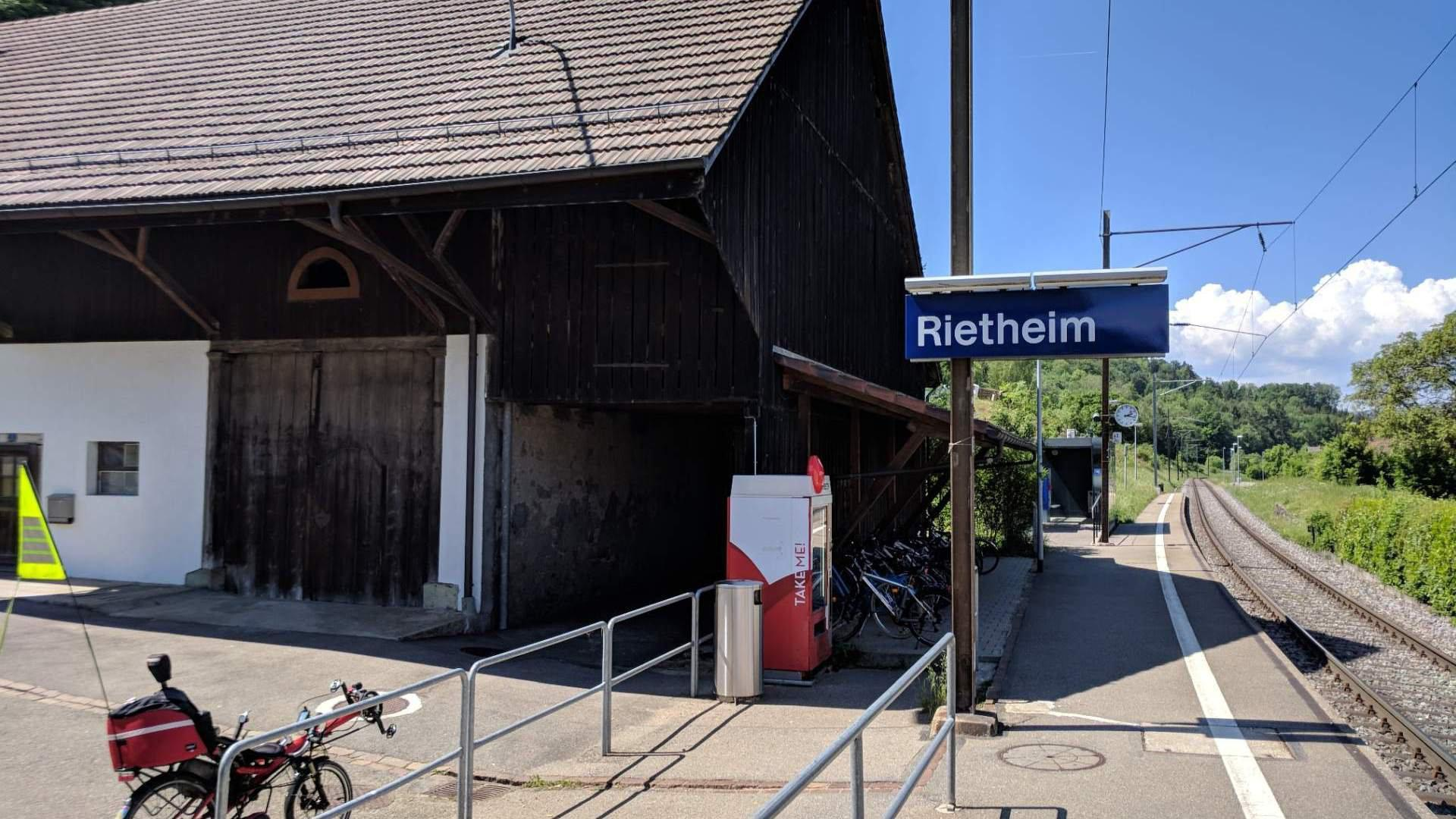
- The station in 2018

General information
- Location: Rietheim, Aargau; Switzerland
- Coordinates: 47°36′03″N 8°16′38″E
- Elevation: 332 m (1,089 ft)
- Owner: Swiss Federal Railways
- Line: Winterthur–Bülach–Koblenz line
- Distance: 43.4 km (27.0 mi) from Winterthur
- Platforms: 1 side platform
- Tracks: 1
- Train operators: Swiss Federal Railways; THURBO
- Connections: PostAuto Schweiz bus lines

Other information
- Fare zone: 563 (A-Welle)

Passengers
- 2018: 240 per working day

Services
Preceding station	Aargau S-Bahn	Following station
Koblenz Dorf towards Baden	S27	Bad Zurzach Terminus
Preceding station	Zurich S-Bahn	Following station
Koblenz Dorf towards Waldshut	S36	Bad Zurzach towards Bülach
Location

Rietheim railway station (German: Bahnhof Rietheim) is a railway station in the Swiss canton of Aargau and municipality of Rietheim. The station is located on the Winterthur to Koblenz line of Swiss Federal Railways.

== Services ==
As of the December 2020 timetable change, the following services stop at Rietheim:

- Aargau S-Bahn S27 / Zürich S-Bahn S36: half-hourly service between Waldshut and Bad Zurzach and hourly service to Bülach and Baden.
