= Zweidlen railway station =

Railway station in Switzerland

Zweidlen
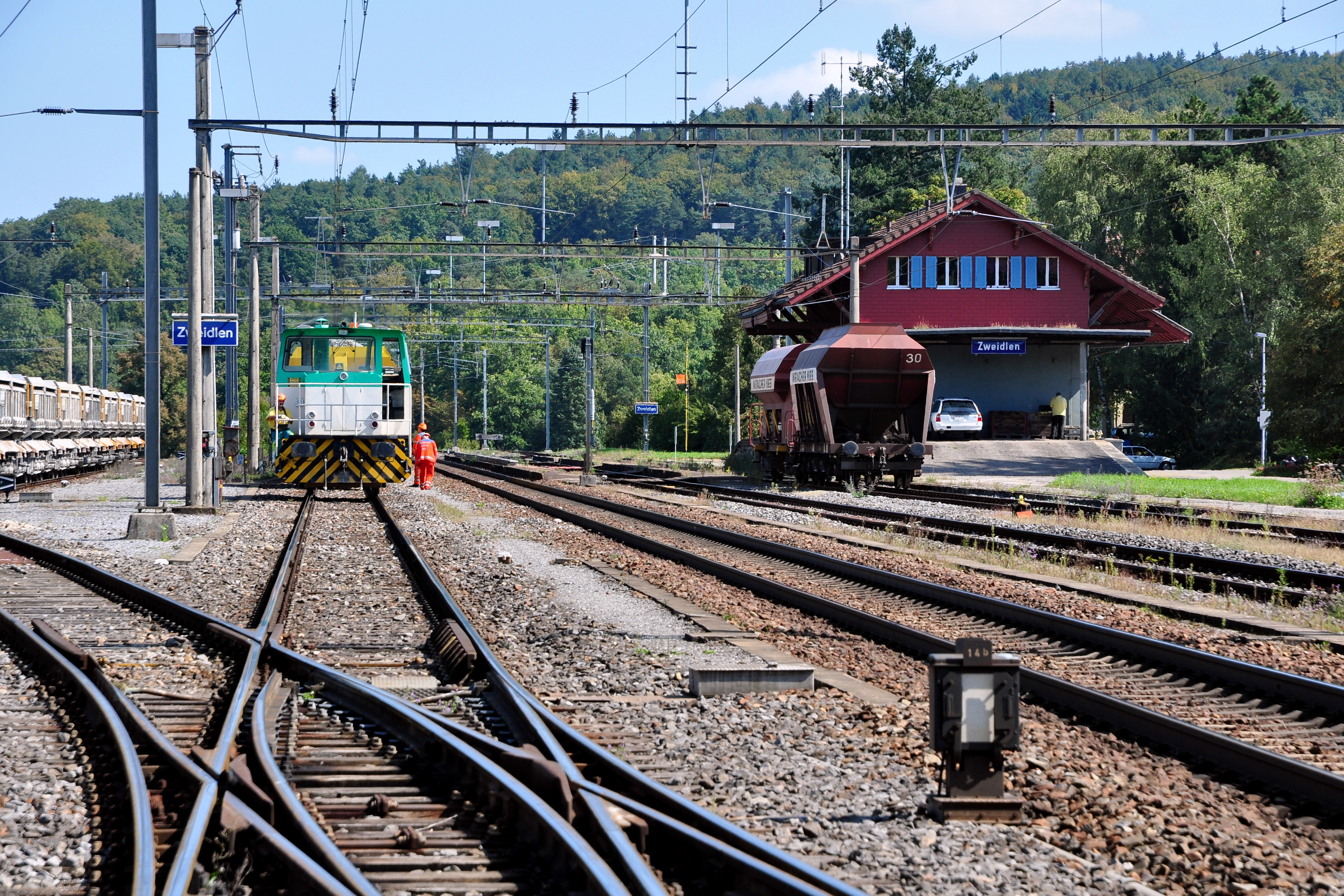
- The station in 2011

General information
- Location: Bahnhofstrasse; Glattfelden, Zürich; Switzerland
- Coordinates: 47°34′13″N 8°28′04″E
- Elevation: 369 m (1,211 ft)
- Owner: Swiss Federal Railways
- Line: Winterthur–Bülach–Koblenz line
- Distance: 26.2 km (16.3 mi) from Winterthur
- Platforms: 1 island platform; 1 side platform
- Tracks: 3
- Train operators: Thurbo
- Connections: PostAuto Schweiz line 540

Other information
- Fare zone: 113 (ZVV)

Passengers
- 2018: 110 per working day

Services
Preceding station	Zurich S-Bahn	Following station
Kaiserstuhl AG towards Waldshut	S36	Eglisau towards Bülach
Location
- Location within Switzerland Location within Canton of Zurich

Zweidlen railway station (German: Bahnhof Zweidlen) is a railway station in the Swiss canton of Zurich and municipality of Glattfelden, near the village of Zweidlen. It is located on the Winterthur to Koblenz line, within fare zone 113 of the Zürcher Verkehrsverbund (ZVV).

The station is also the loading point for trains carrying gravel from the nearby works of Weiacher Kies AG.

== Services ==
As of the December 2020 timetable change, the following services stop at Zweidlen:

- Zurich S-Bahn S36: hourly service between Waldshut and Bülach.

== Gallery ==
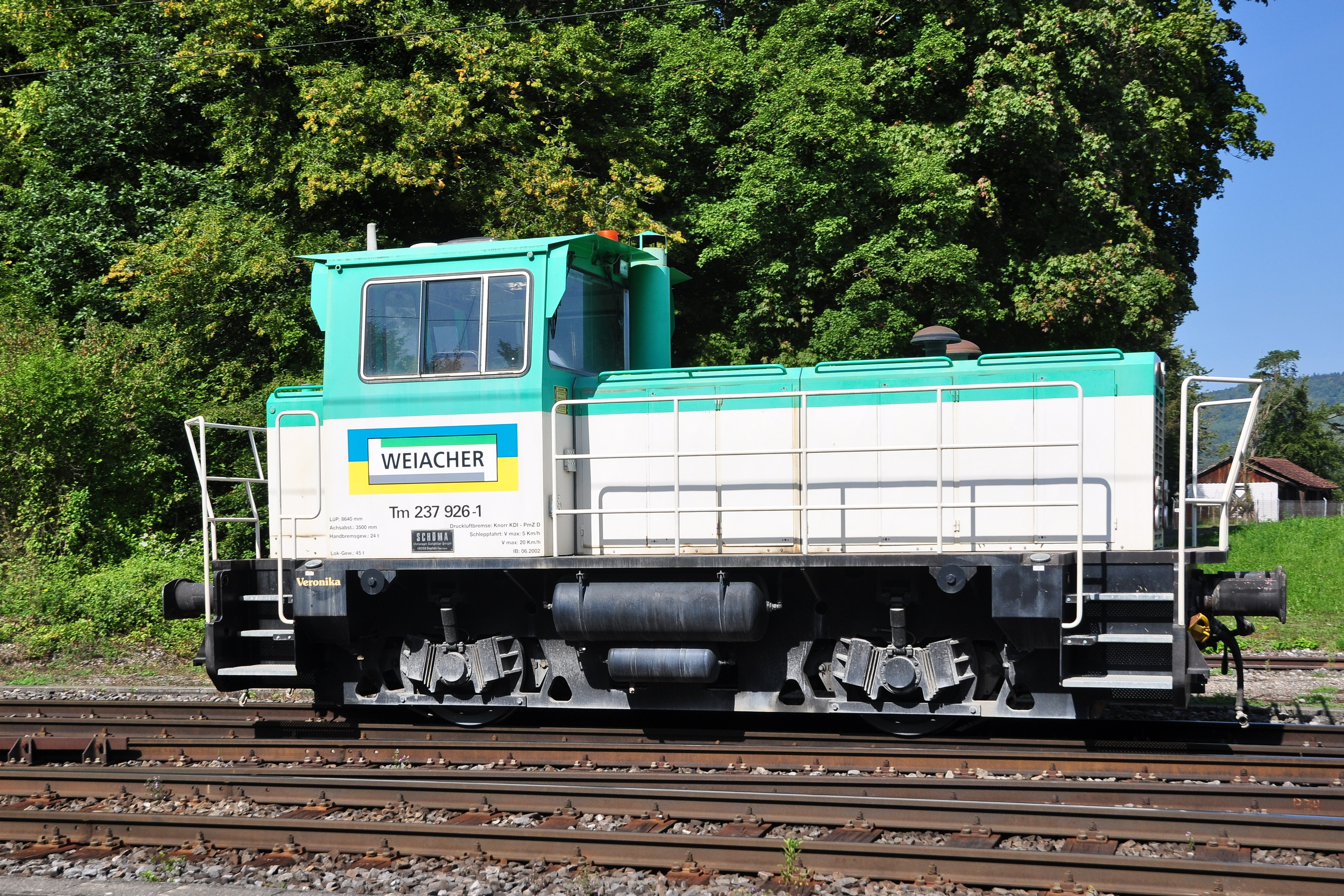
Weiacher Kies locomotive

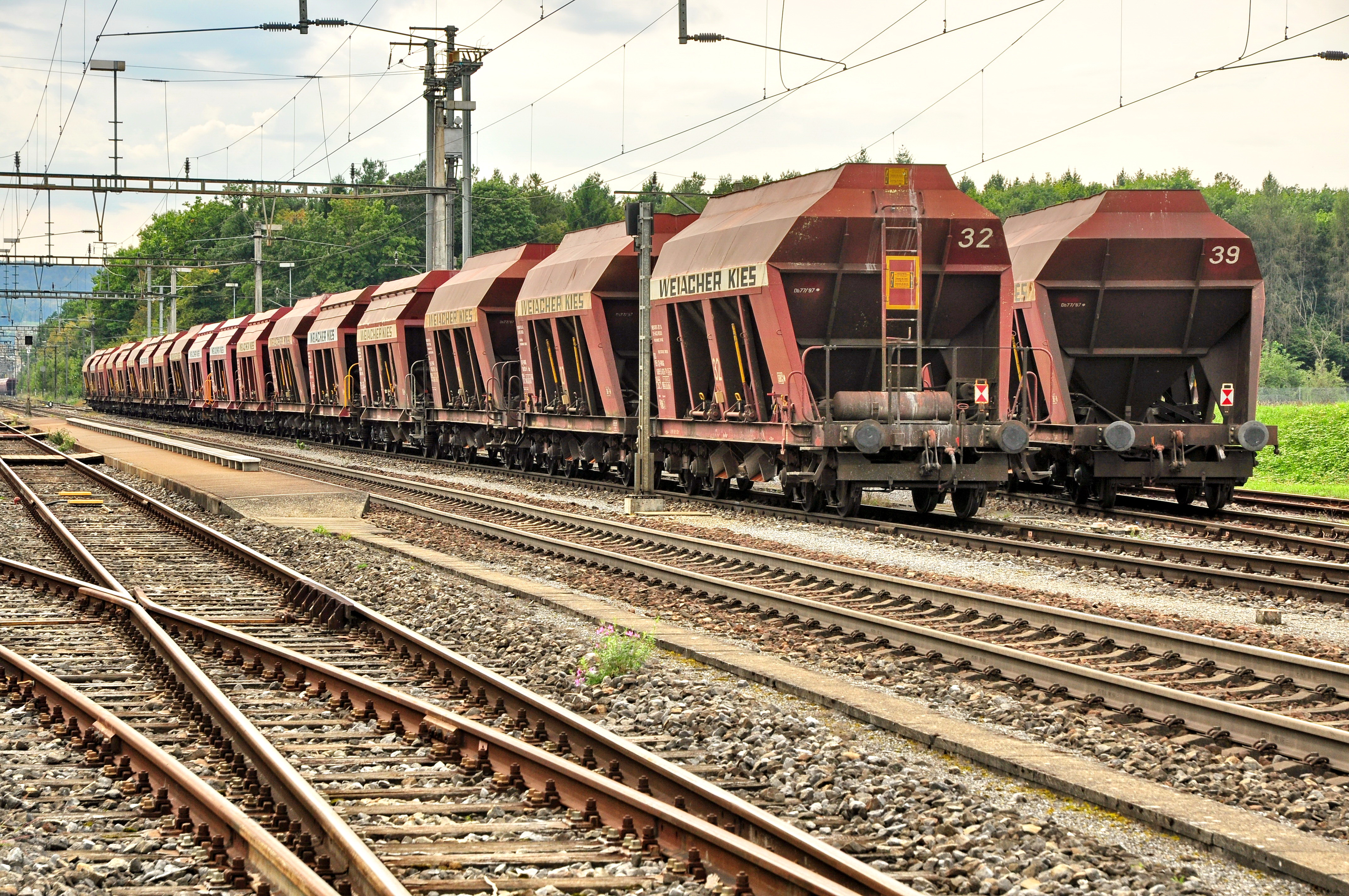
Weiacher Kies wagons

== See also ==
- Rail transport in Switzerland
