= S36 (ZVV) =

Railway service in Switzerland

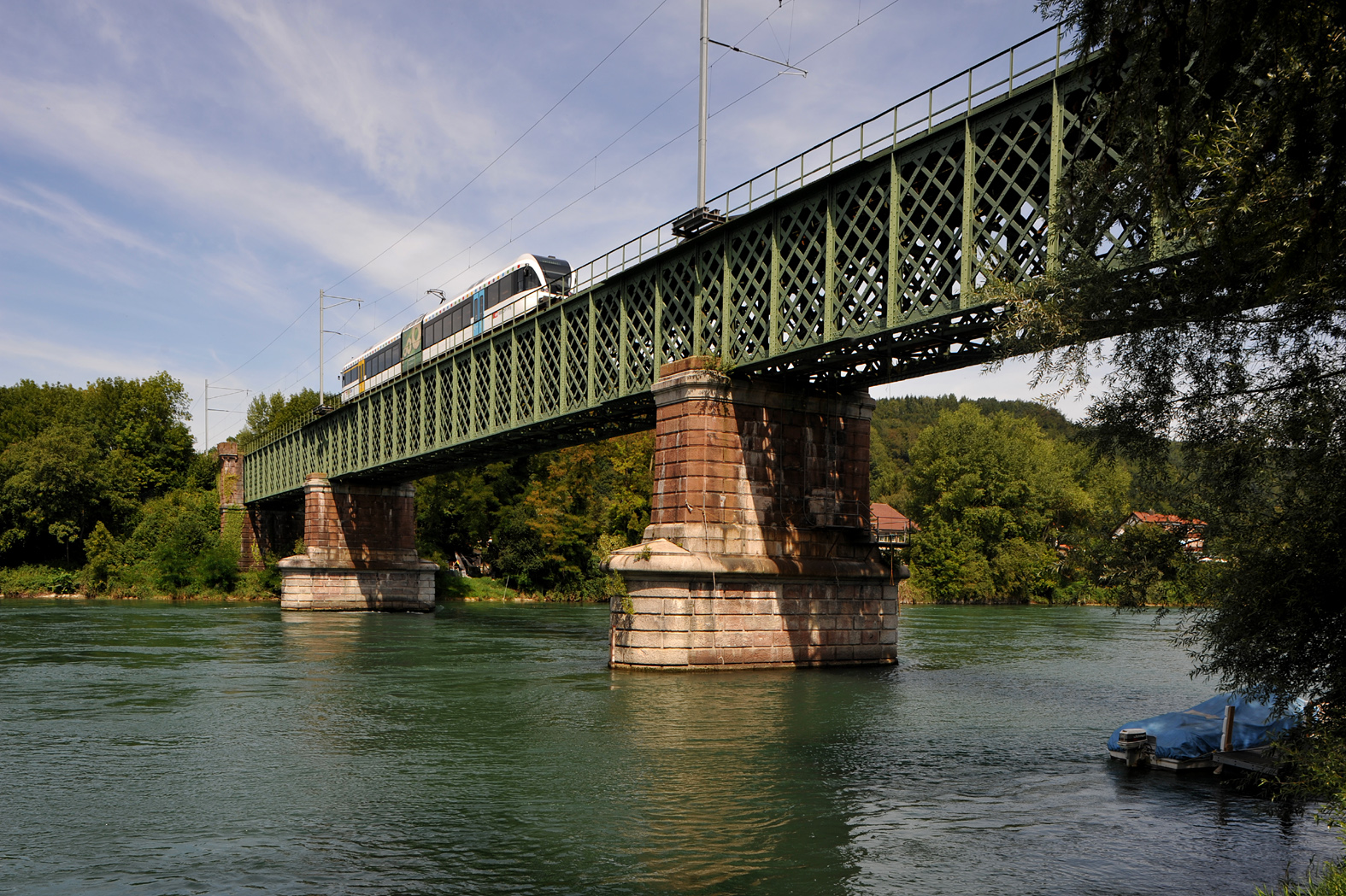
- Thurbo EMU as S36 on the Rhine bridge

Overview
- Locale: Germany, Switzerland
- Termini: Waldshut; Bülach
- Stations: 12

Service
- Type: S-Bahn
- System: Zurich S-Bahn
- Operator(s): Thurbo

History
- Opened: 9 December 2018

Technical
- Track gauge: 1,435 mm (4 ft 8 1/2 in) standard gauge

Zurich S-Bahn network as of December 2018

The S36 is a regional railway service of the Zurich S-Bahn operated by Thurbo. The service runs hourly between Waldshut and Bülach over the western half of the Winterthur–Bülach–Koblenz railway, calling at stations in the Swiss cantons of Aargau and Zurich, and the German state of Baden-Württemberg.

The service began on 9 December 2018, replacing the S41, which had operated from Waldshut to Winterthur. The S41's western terminus became Bülach.

== Route ==
- S36 Waldshut–Bad Zurzach–Bülach

The service runs from Bülach, in the canton of Zurich, to Koblenz, in the canton of Aargau, on the Winterthur to Koblenz line. At Koblenz, the service reverses direction and continues to Waldshut in Baden-Württemberg (Germany), using a short stretch of the Turgi to Waldshut line and crossing the historic Waldshut–Koblenz Rhine Bridge.

=== Stations ===
The service operates hourly and stops at the following stations (no call at Glattfelden):

- Bülach
- Eglisau
- Zweidlen
- Kaiserstuhl AG
- Rümikon AG
- Mellikon
- Rekingen AG
- Bad Zurzach
- Rietheim
- Koblenz Dorf
- Koblenz

Swiss-German border

- Waldshut

== See also ==
- Rail transport in Switzerland
- Public transport in Zurich
- ZVV fare zones
- A-Welle tariff network (Aargau)
