= Winterthur–Bülach–Koblenz railway =

Railway line in Switzerland

Winterthur–Bülach–Koblenz
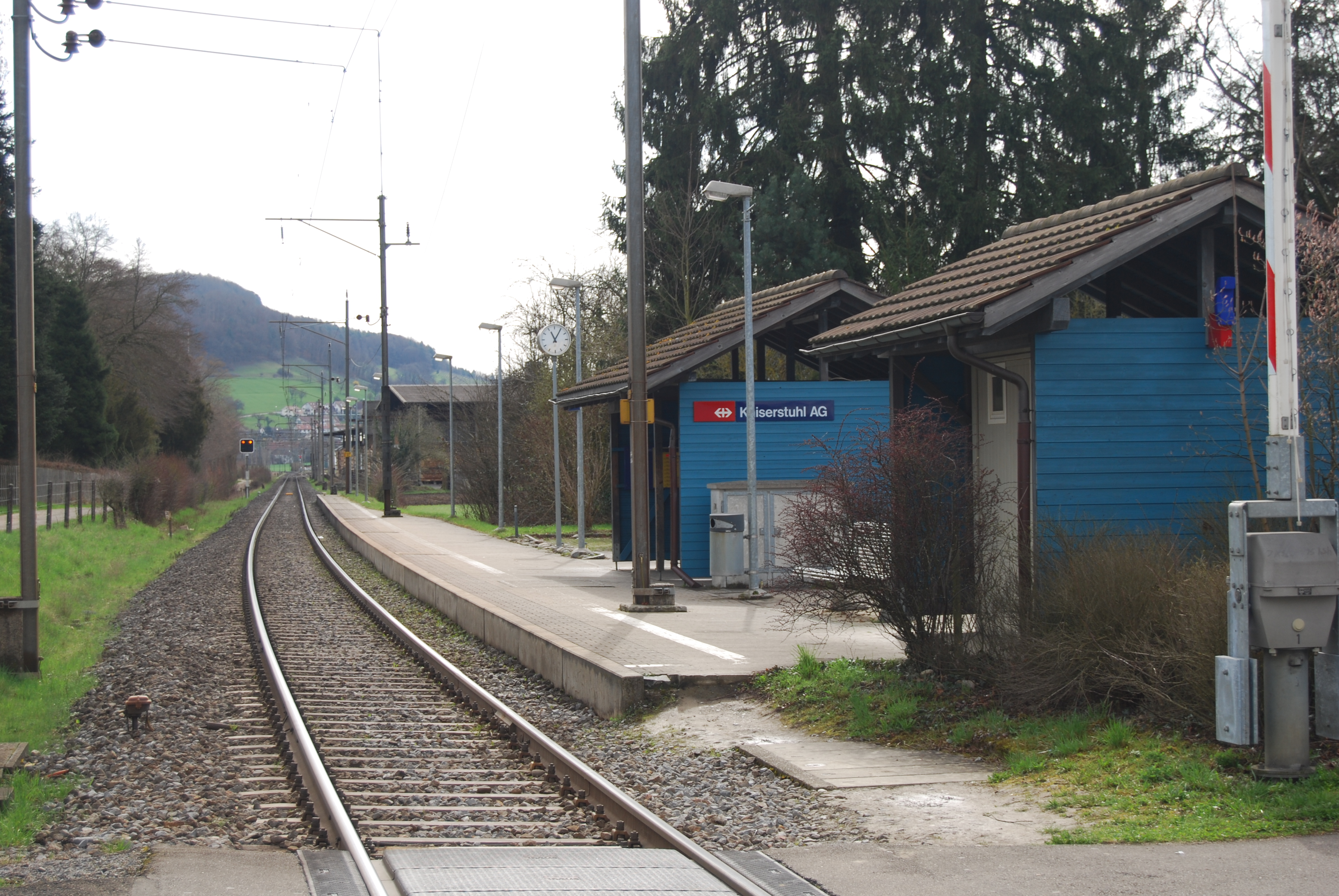
- Kaiserstuhl station

Overview
- Owner: Swiss Federal Railways
- Line number: 761
- Locale: Switzerland
- Termini: Winterthur, Canton of Zurich; Koblenz, Aargau

History
- Opened: August 1876

Technical
- Line length: 48.4 km (30.1 mi)
- Track gauge: 1,435 mm (4 ft 8 1/2 in) standard gauge
- Electrification: 15 kV 16.7 Hz AC

The Winterthur–Bülach–Koblenz railway is a railway line in Switzerland. It links the city of Winterthur in the canton of Zurich with the municipality of Koblenz in the canton of Aargau. The line was opened in August 1876, by the Swiss Northeastern Railway (NOB), and is now owned by the Swiss Federal Railways.

Passenger service over the line is provided by the trains of the Zürich S-Bahn. S36 trains operate from Waldshut (in Germany) to Bülach via Koblenz. The S41 operates between Bülach and Winterthur. The midsection of the line, between Bülach and Eglisau, also carries the S9 and long-distance passenger trains between Zürich Hauptbahnhof and Schaffhausen. On the western end of the line, Aargau S-Bahn S27 trains operate as far east as Bad Zurzach.

There is also some freight traffic on the line, including through freight between Germany and the Gotthard line over the Bülach to Eglisau section. On the rest of the line, a container terminal is served at Rekingen and a gravel mine at Zweidlen station. In addition there are several trains, principally fuel trains operating to the fuel depot at Glattbrugg station, that route from Basel to Koblenz and then use this route to bypass Zurich.

The line is constructed to standard gauge and is electrified using the Swiss standard of 15 kV 16.7 Hz AC supplied by overhead line. Most of the line is of single track with passing loops, but the busier section between Bülach and Eglisau is double-tracked.
