= Bäretswil railway station =

Train station in Switzerland

Bäretswil
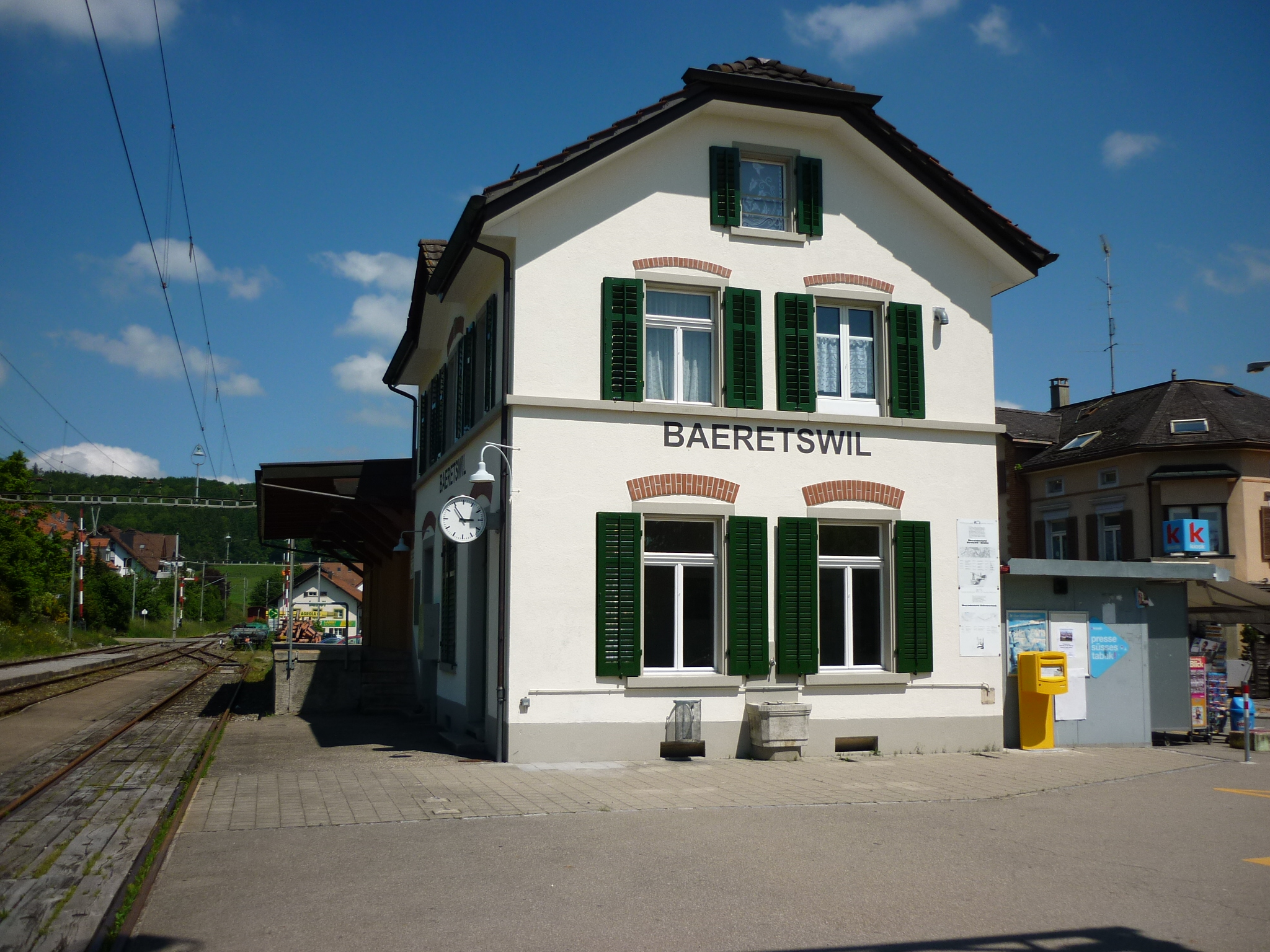
- The station building in 2010

General information
- Location: Bäretswil, Canton of Zürich; Switzerland
- Coordinates: 47°20′14″N 8°51′08″E
- Elevation: 696 m (2,283 ft)
- Owner: Sursee-Triengen-Bahn
- Line: Uerikon–Bauma line
- Distance: 19.7 km (12.2 mi) from Uerikon
- Train operators: Dampfbahn-Verein Zürcher Oberland
- Connections: VZO bus lines

Other information
- Fare zone: 172 (ZVV)

Services
Preceding station	Dampfbahn-Verein Zürcher Oberland	Following station
Ettenhausen-Emmetschloo towards Hinwil	Uerikon–Bauma railway	Neuthal towards Bauma
Location

Bäretswil railway station (German: Bahnhof Bäretswil) is a railway station in the municipality of Bäretswil, in the Swiss canton of Zürich. It is located on the standard gauge Uerikon–Bauma line of the Sursee-Triengen-Bahn. There is no daily passenger service over the line, but the Dampfbahn-Verein Zürcher Oberland heritage railway operates seasonal excursion service between Bauma and Hinwil.

== Services ==
As of the December 2020 timetable change, the following services stop at Bäretswil:

- Dampfbahn-Verein Zürcher Oberland:
  - between May and September, six round-trips every other Saturday between Bauma and Hinwil.
  - from the second week of September through the third week in October: three round-trips Monday through Thursday and six round-trips Friday through Sunday between Bauma and Hinwil.
