= Effretikon–Hinwil railway line =

Railway line in the canton of Zürich, Switzerland

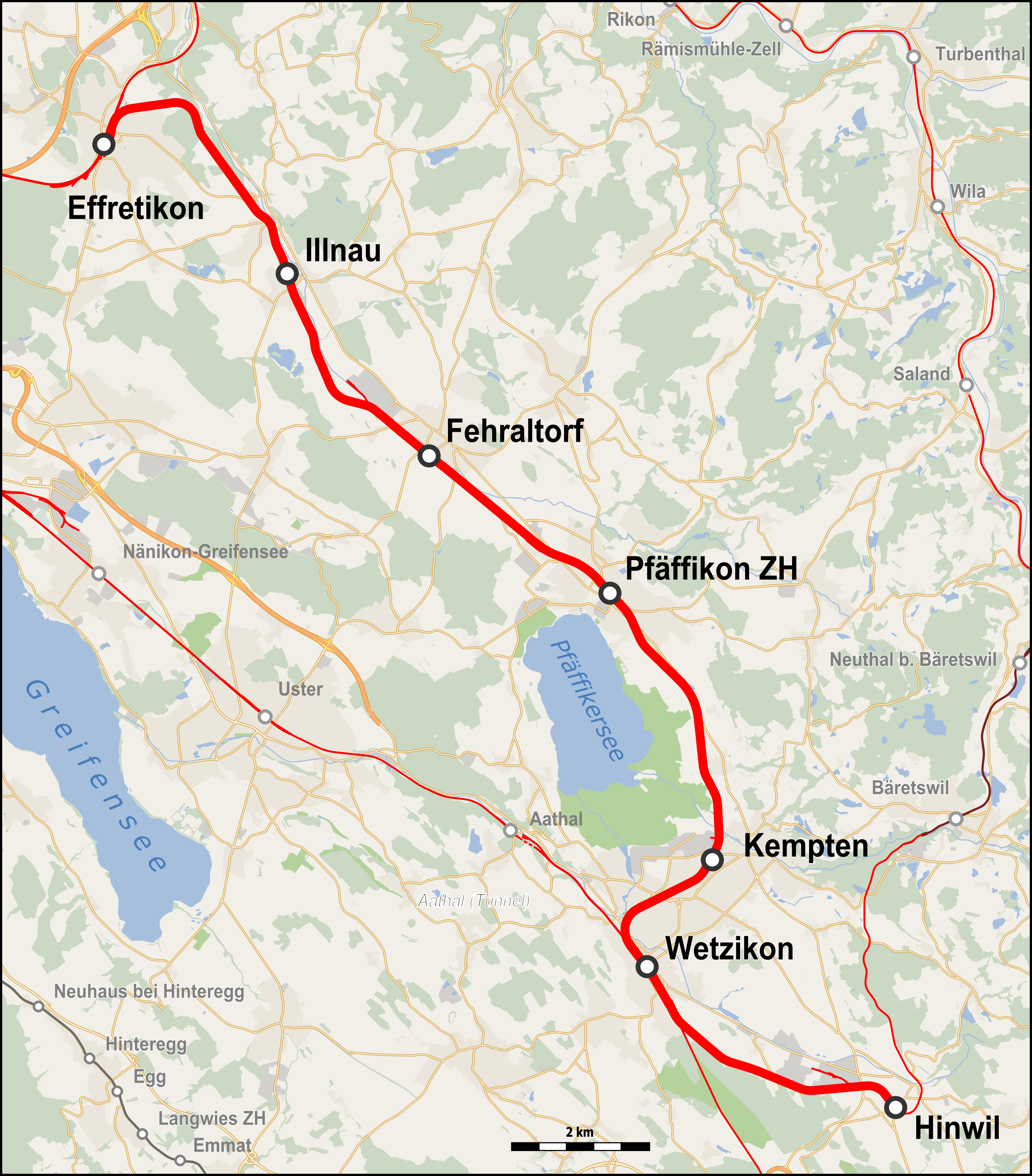
- Route map

Overview
- Owner: Swiss Federal Railways

History
- Opened: 17 August 1876
- Electrification: 7 May 1944

Technical
- Line length: 22.5 km (14.0 mi)
- Track gauge: 1,435 mm (4 ft 8 1/2 in) standard gauge
- Electrification: 15 kV 16.7 Hz AC overhead catenary

The Effretikon to Hinwil railway line, also known as the Kempttalbahn, is a railway line in the Swiss canton of Zurich. It runs from Effretikon, where it diverges from the Zurich to Winterthur line, to Wetzikon, where it connects with the Wallisellen to Rapperswil line, and Hinwil. The line is 22.5 kilometres (14.0 mi) long, standard gauge, single track and electrified at 15 kV 16.7 Hz AC supplied by overhead line.

== History ==
The Effretikon to Hinwil line was constructed between 1873 and 1876 by the Eisenbahngesellschaft Effretikon–Pfäffikon–Hinwil, but was operated from the beginning by the Swiss Northeastern Railway (NOB). The line passed to the Swiss Federal Railways in 1902, and was electrified in 1944.

At Hinwil, the Effretikon to Hinwil line makes a junction with the former Uerikon to Bauma railway (UeBB). The Uerikon to Hinwil section of this line was closed in 1948 and little now remains (the section between Hinwil and Bubikon was dismantled). But in the other direction, to Bauma on the Tösstal railway line, the Dampfbahn-Verein Zürcher Oberland (DVZO) operates heritage railway services, with trains normally hauled by steam locomotives.

== Service ==
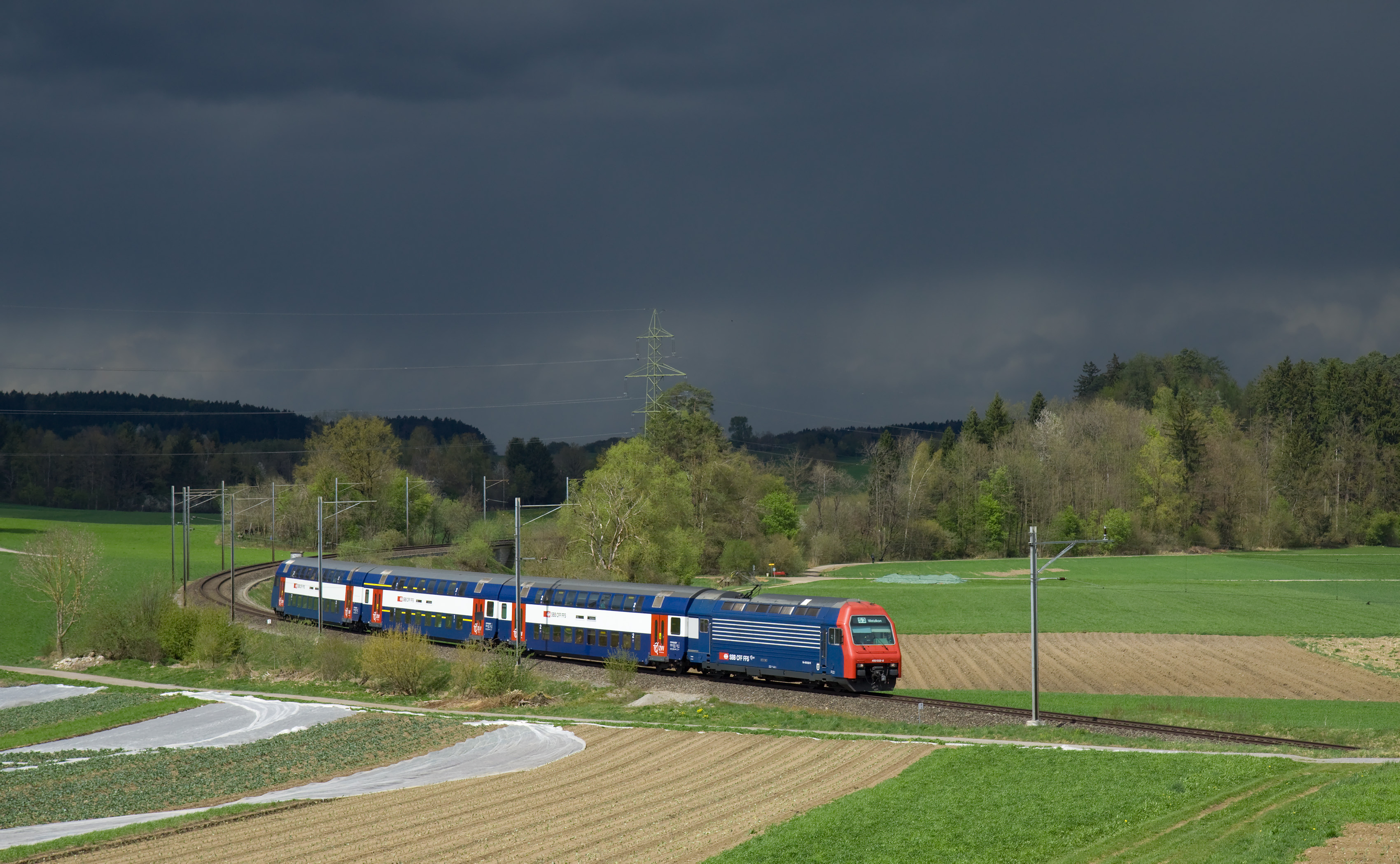
S3 service between Illnau and Fehraltorf

The Effretikon to Hinwil line is served by passenger services of the Zurich S-Bahn, although no single route runs throughout the line.

- Route S3 operates from Zürich via Effretikon to Wetzikon, where it terminates.
- During peak-hours, line S19 operates from Zürich via Effretikon to Pfäffikon.
- Route S14 operates from Zürich to Wetzikon, using the alternative and faster route from Wallisellen, but then continues on this line to terminate at Hinwil.
