= Ettenhausen-Emmetschloo railway station =

Train station in Switzerland

Ettenhausen-Emmetschloo
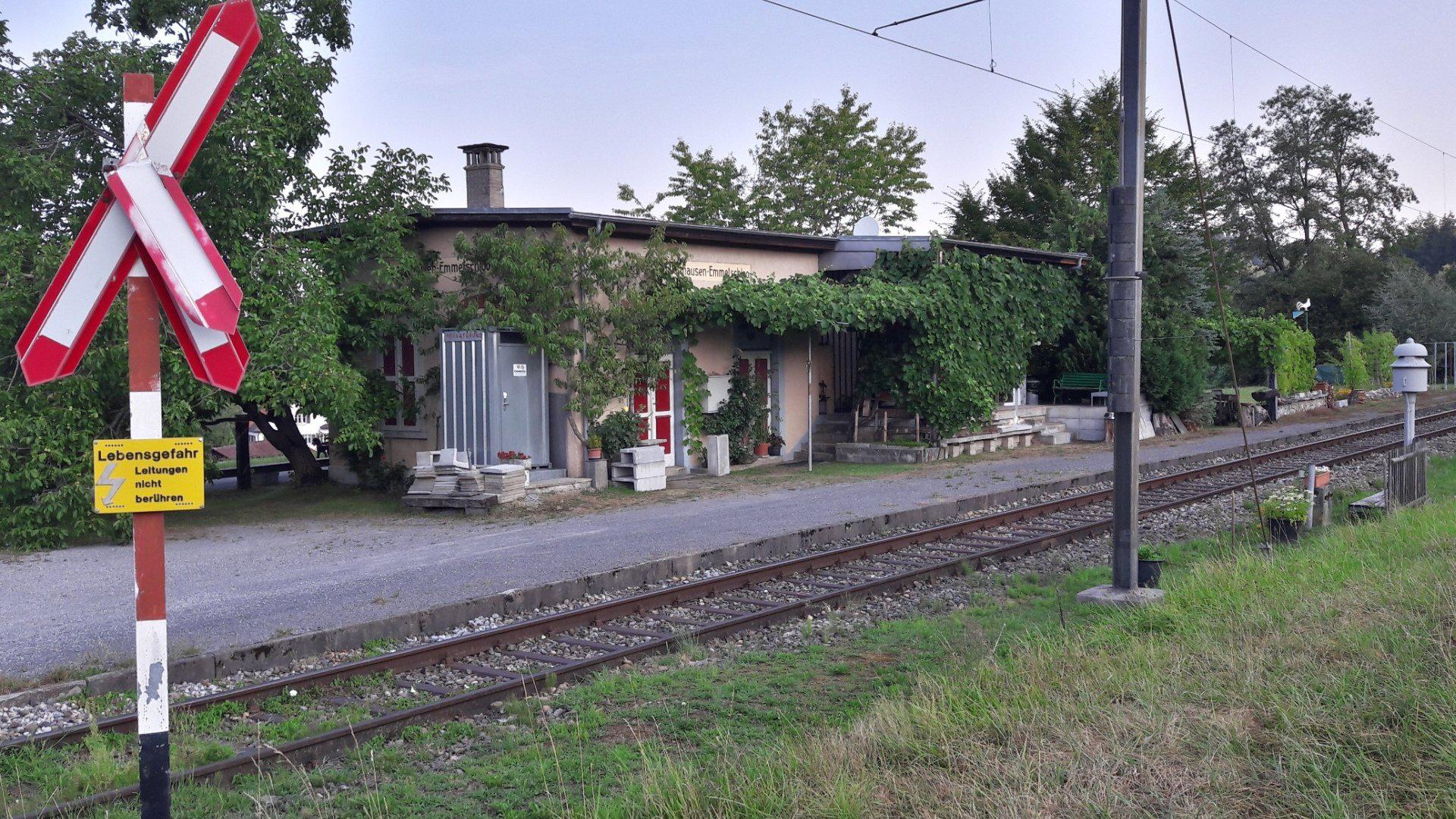
- The station building in 2018

General information
- Location: Wetzikon, Canton of Zürich; Switzerland
- Coordinates: 47°19′29″N 8°50′03″E
- Elevation: 649 m (2,129 ft)
- Owner: Sursee-Triengen-Bahn
- Line: Uerikon–Bauma line
- Distance: 17.6 km (10.9 mi) from Uerikon
- Train operators: Dampfbahn-Verein Zürcher Oberland

Services
| Preceding station | Dampfbahn-Verein Zürcher Oberland | Following station |
|---|---|---|
| Hinwil Terminus | Uerikon–Bauma railway | Bäretswil towards Bauma |
Location

Ettenhausen-Emmetschloo railway station (German: Bahnhof Ettenhausen-Emmetschloo) is a railway station in the municipality of Wetzikon, in the Swiss canton of Zürich. It is located on the standard gauge Uerikon–Bauma line of the Sursee-Triengen-Bahn. There is no daily passenger service over the line, but the Dampfbahn-Verein Zürcher Oberland heritage railway operates seasonal excursion service between Bauma and Hinwil.

== Services ==
As of the December 2020 timetable change, the following services stop at Ettenhausen-Emmetschloo:

- Dampfbahn-Verein Zürcher Oberland:
  - between May and September, six round-trips every other Saturday between Bauma and Hinwil.
  - from the second week of September through the third week in October: three round-trips Monday through Thursday and six round-trips Friday through Sunday between Bauma and Hinwil.
