= Neuthal railway station =

Train station in Switzerland

Neuthal
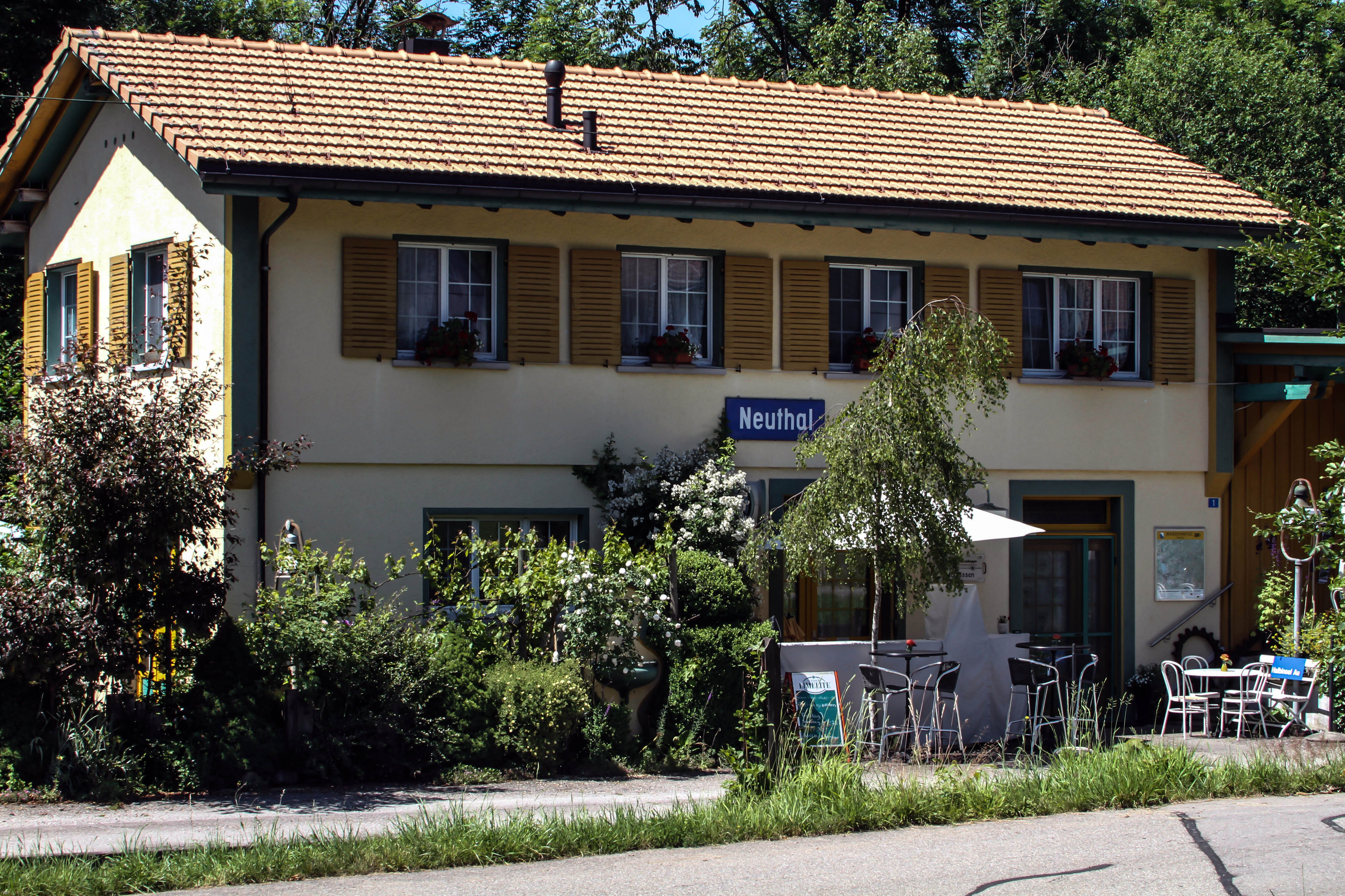
- The former station building, now a restaurant, in 2013

General information
- Location: Bäretswil, Canton of Zürich; Switzerland
- Coordinates: 47°21′28″N 8°51′52″E
- Elevation: 696 m (2,283 ft)
- Owner: Sursee-Triengen-Bahn
- Line: Uerikon–Bauma line
- Distance: 22.5 km (14.0 mi) from Uerikon
- Train operators: Dampfbahn-Verein Zürcher Oberland
- Connections: VZO bus lines

Other information
- Fare zone: 172 (ZVV)

Services
Preceding station	Dampfbahn-Verein Zürcher Oberland	Following station
Bäretswil towards Hinwil	Uerikon–Bauma railway	Bauma Terminus
Location

Neuthal railway station (German: Bahnhof Neuthal) is a railway station in the municipality of Bäretswil, in the Swiss canton of Zürich. It is located on the standard gauge Uerikon–Bauma line of the Sursee-Triengen-Bahn. There is no daily passenger service over the line, but the Dampfbahn-Verein Zürcher Oberland heritage railway operates seasonal excursion service between Bauma and Hinwil. The station building itself is now the home of the Wildi Bistro-schuppe restaurant.

== Services ==
As of the December 2020 timetable change, the following services stop at Neuthal:

- Dampfbahn-Verein Zürcher Oberland:
  - between May and September, six round-trips every other Saturday between Bauma and Hinwil.
  - from the second week of September through the third week in October: three round-trips Monday through Thursday and six round-trips Friday through Sunday between Bauma and Hinwil.
