= Adolf Guyer-Zeller =

Swiss entrepreneur

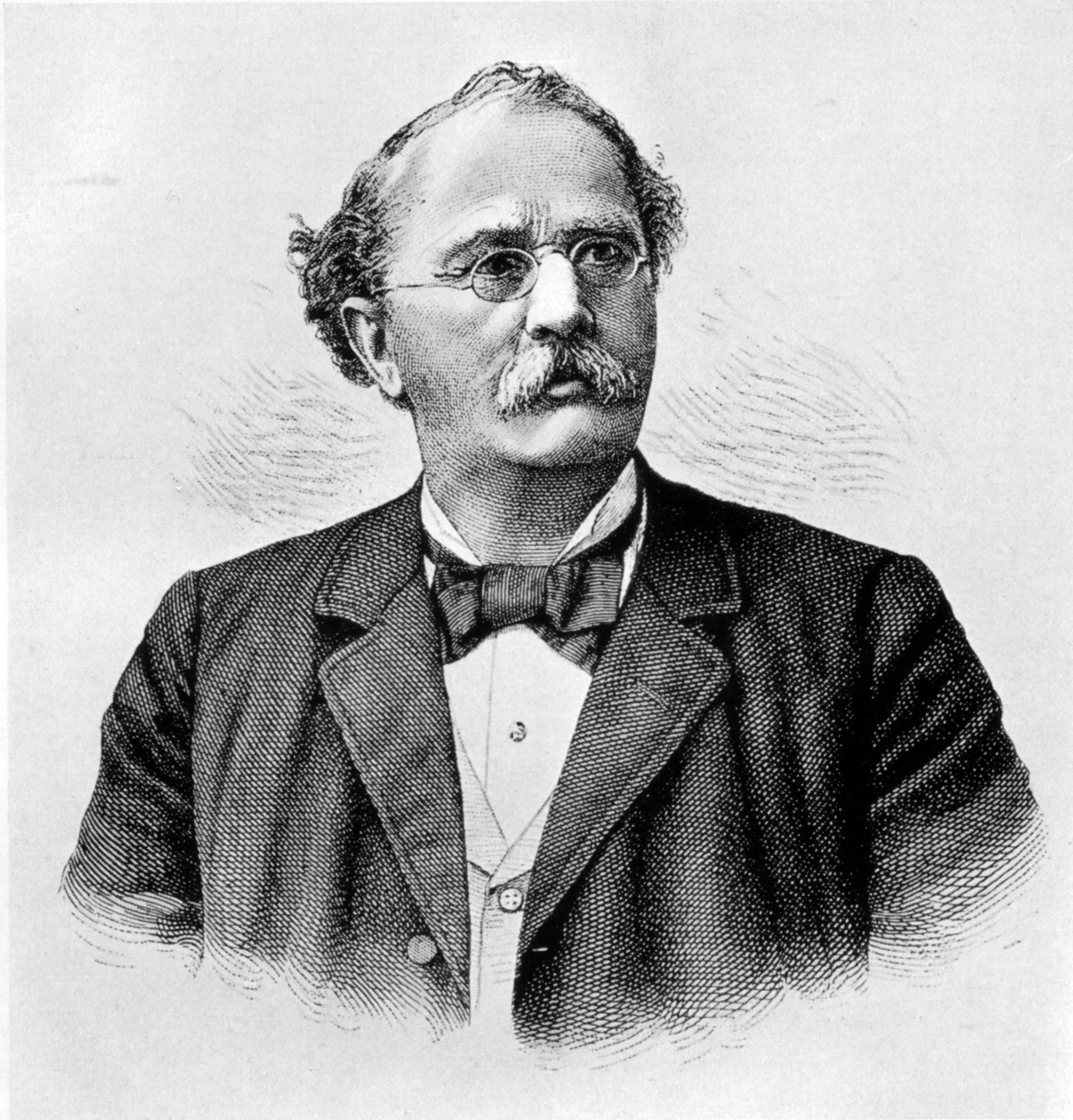
- Born: 1 May 1839; Bäretswil, Switzerland
- Died: 3 April 1899 (aged 59); Zürich, Switzerland
- Occupation: Entrepreneur

Adolf Guyer-Zeller (1 May 1839 – 3 April 1899) was a Swiss entrepreneur.

Born in Bäretswil, Switzerland on 1 May 1839, Guyer-Zeller was the son of an owner of spinning mill and creator of a textile export trade in Zürich. After the death of his father, he led the company. He studied at the Swiss Federal Institute of Technology in Zürich.

Later, he turned his attentions to what had become a booming business, the building of railways in Switzerland. He became, among other things, a president of the Swiss Northeastern Railway (NOB). Guyer-Zeller was also the founder of Jungfrau Railway, (JB) and the Uerikon-Bauma Railway (UeBB). In order to finance the JB, he founded the Bank Guyerzeller AG in 1894, which became fully owned by HSBC in 2004.

On 3 April 1899, Guyer-Zeller, aged 59, died of a heart attack in Zürich.

== Gallery ==
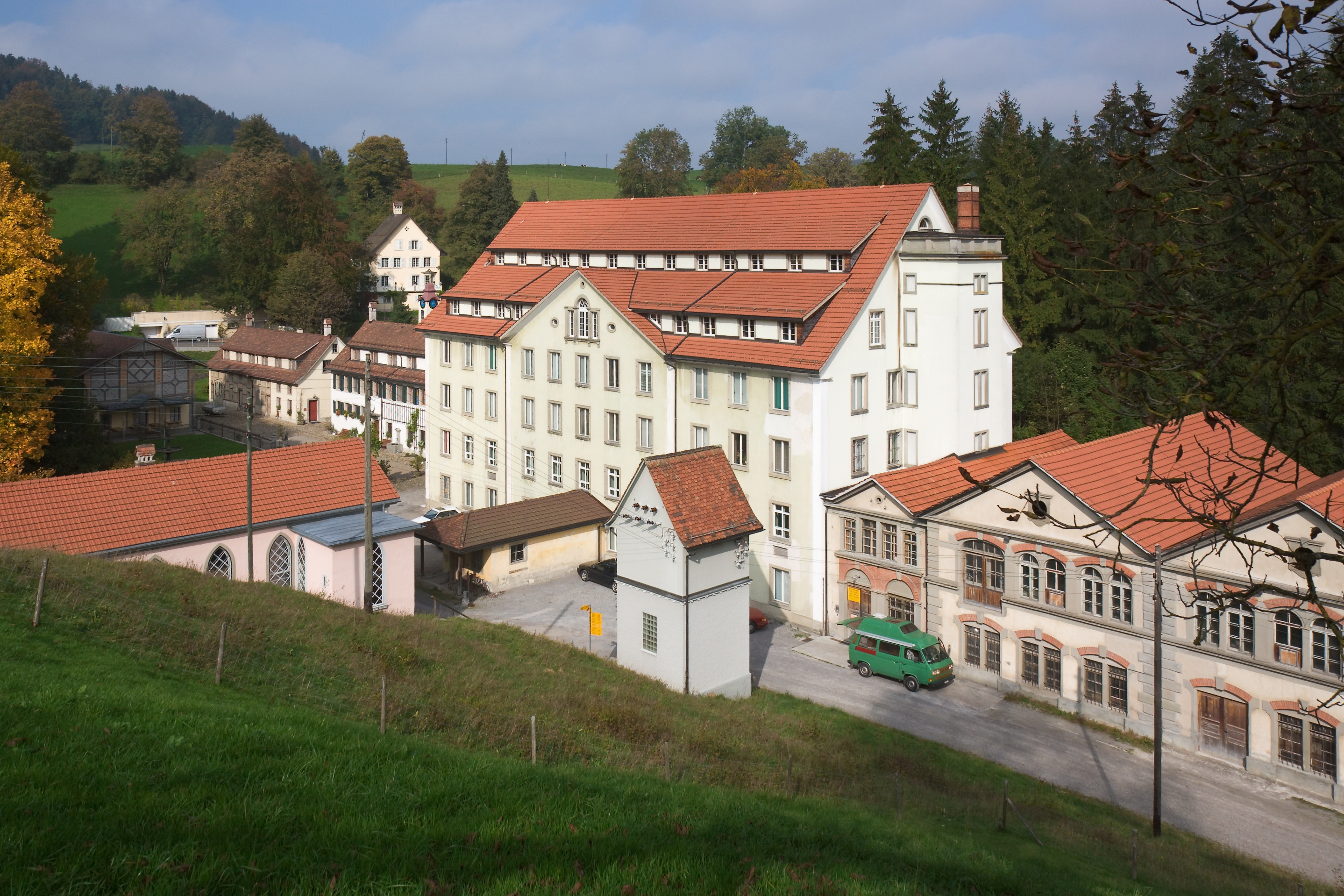
Spinning mill in Neuthal.

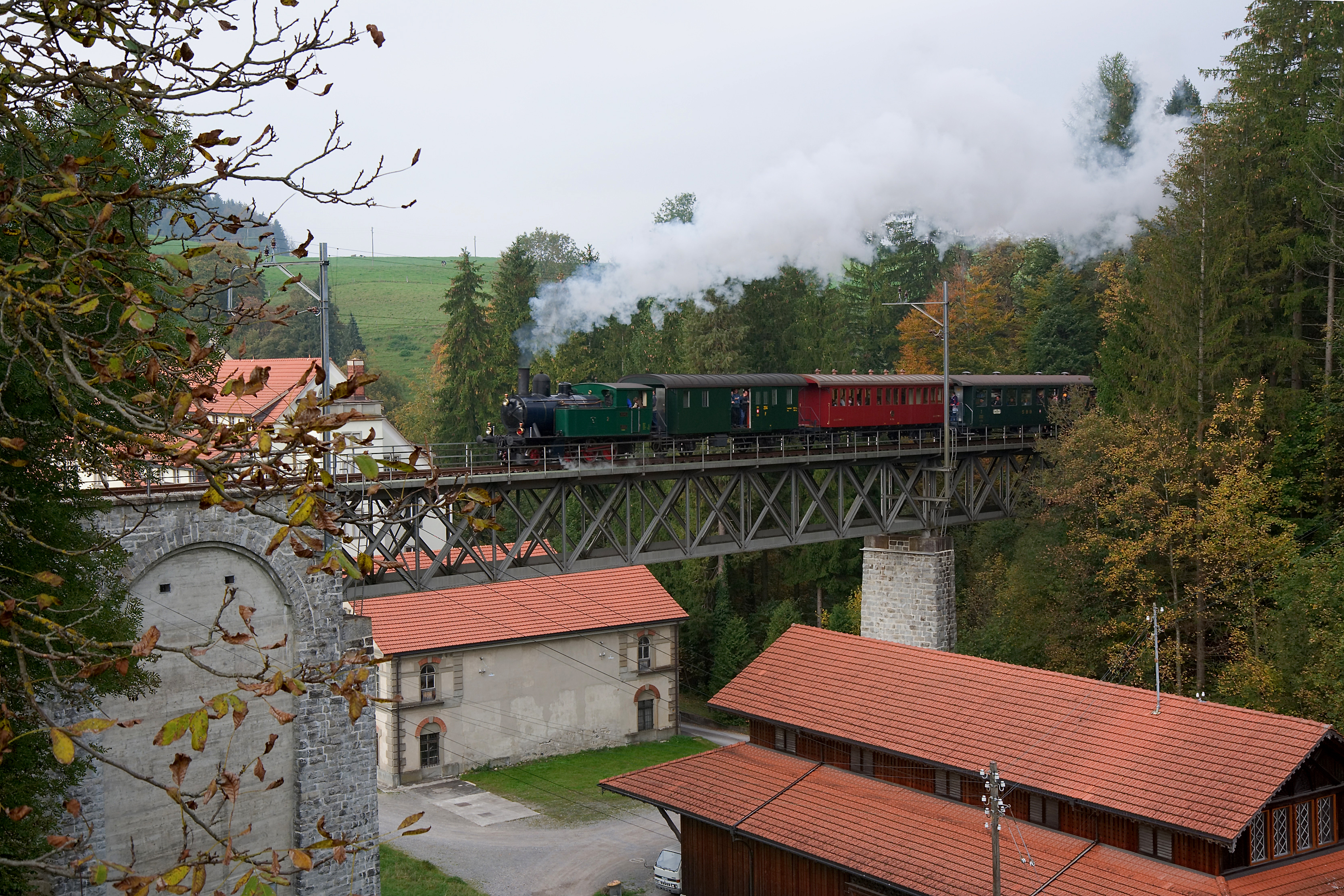
Train passing in front of the mill.
