= Uerikon–Bauma railway =

Railway line in Zurich, Switzerland

Coordinates: 47.3330°N 8.8423°E

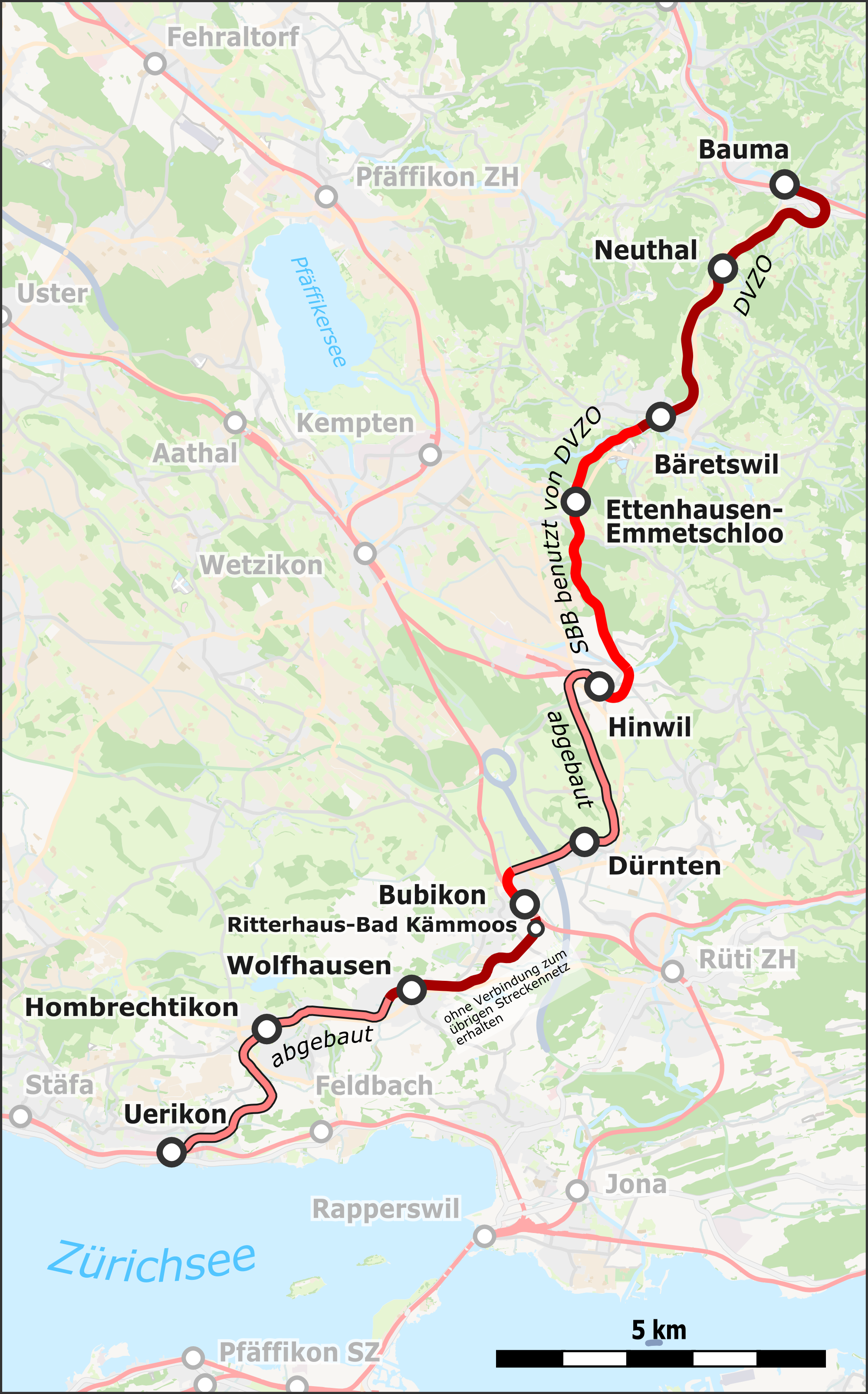
- Map of the route.

Overview
- Status: Closed (Uerikon–Hinwil); Preserved (Hinwil–Bauma)
- Owner: Sursee-Triengen-Bahn

History
- Opened: 1901
- Closed: 1948 (Uerikon–Hinwil)

Technical
- Line length: 25.2 km (15.7 mi)
- Track gauge: 1,435 mm (4 ft 8 1/2 in) standard gauge
- Maximum incline: 2.9%

The Uerikon–Bauma railway (German: Uerikon-Bauma-Bahn, UeBB) is a railway which formerly linked Uerikon, Hombrechtikon, Bubikon, Hinwil, Bäretswil and Bauma in the Swiss canton of Zurich. The line from Uerikon to Hinwil was closed in 1948, and little now remains other than a freight siding in the Bubikon area. From Hinwil to Bauma the line has been preserved by the Dampfbahn-Verein Zürcher Oberland (DVZO) and sees heritage railway services.

== History ==
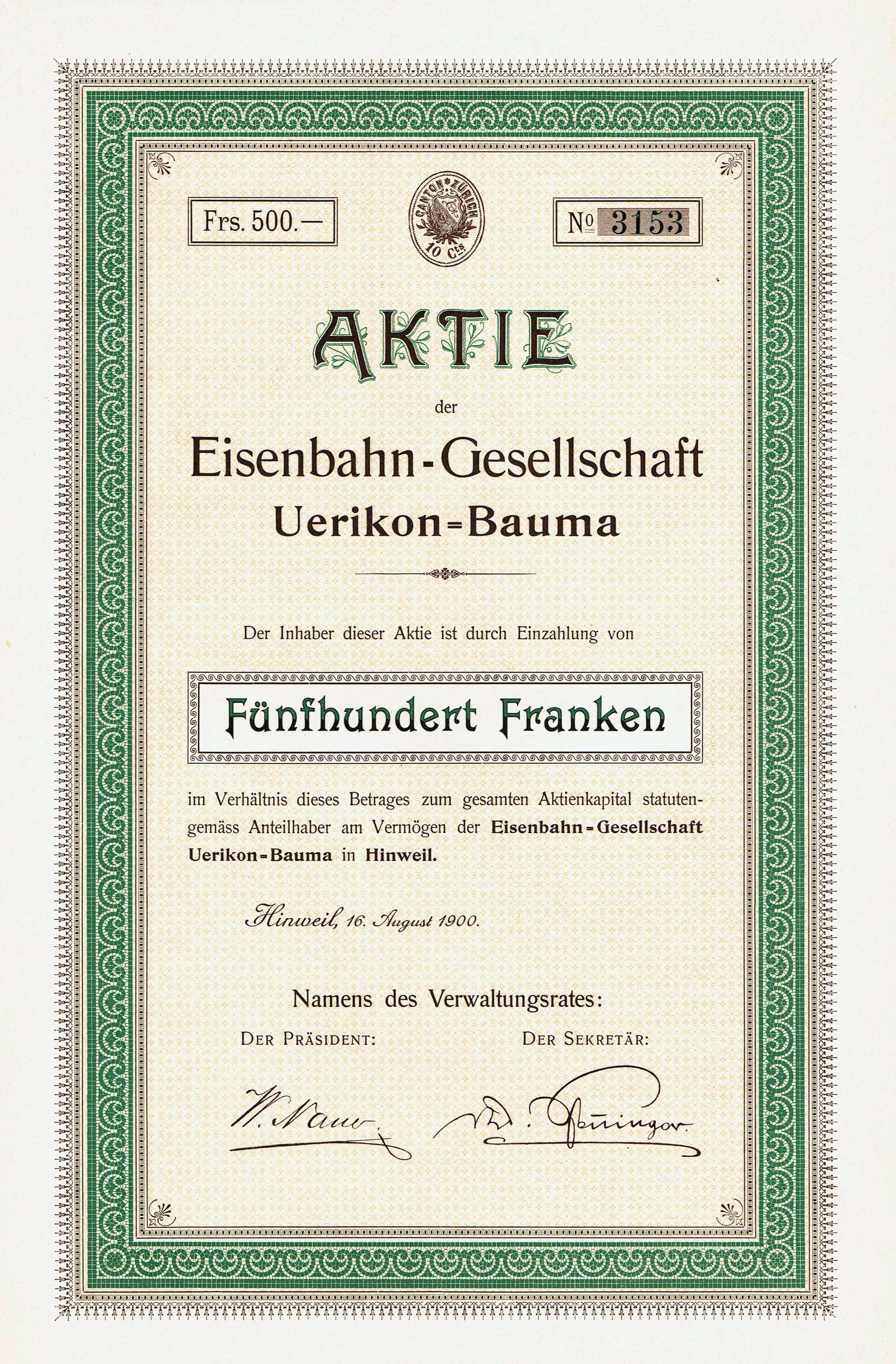
Share of the Eisenbahn-Gesellschaft Uerikon-Bauma, issued 16. August 1900

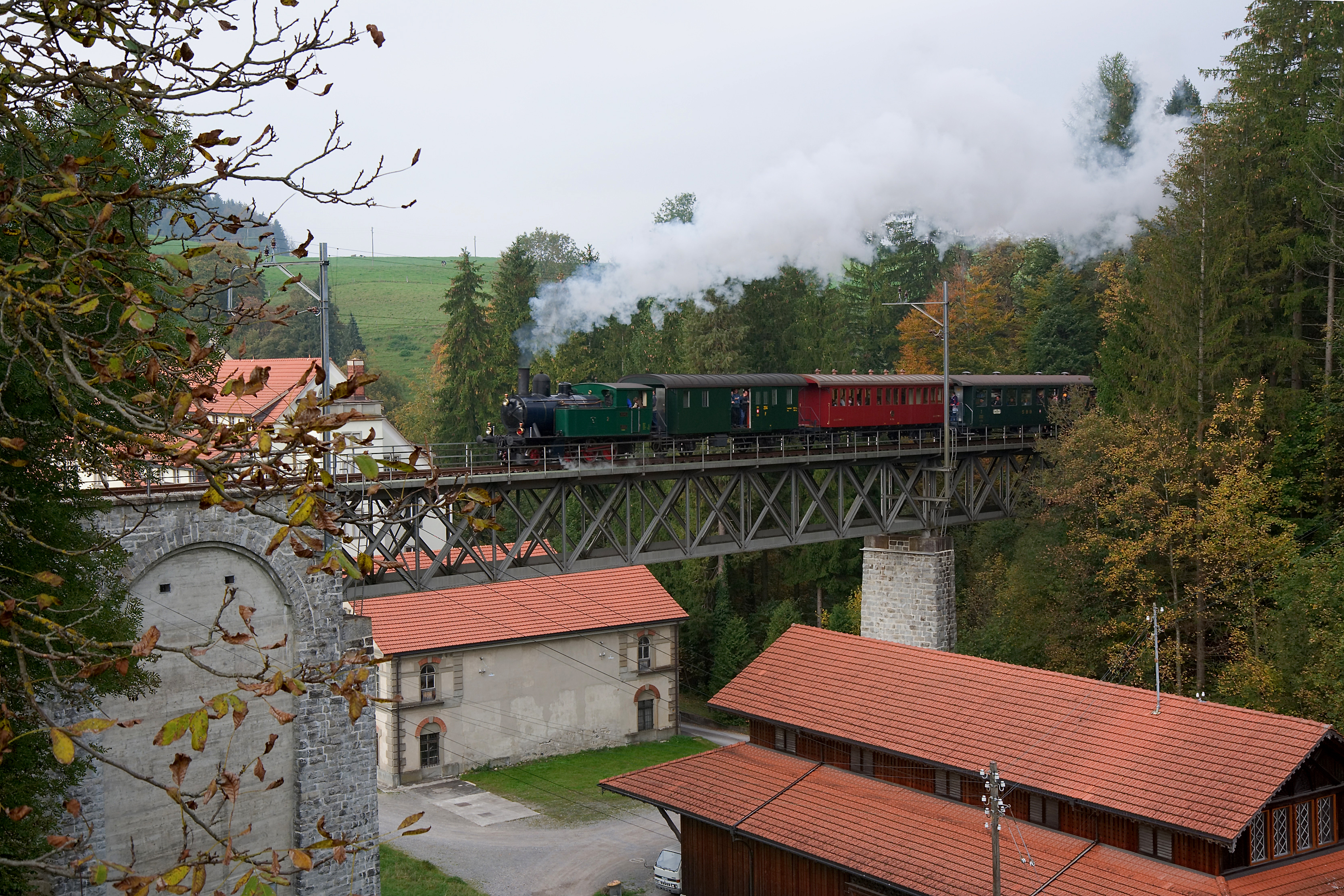
A steam train of the DVZO crosses the a bridge in Bäretswil, with buildings of the Guyer-Zeller textile mill visible

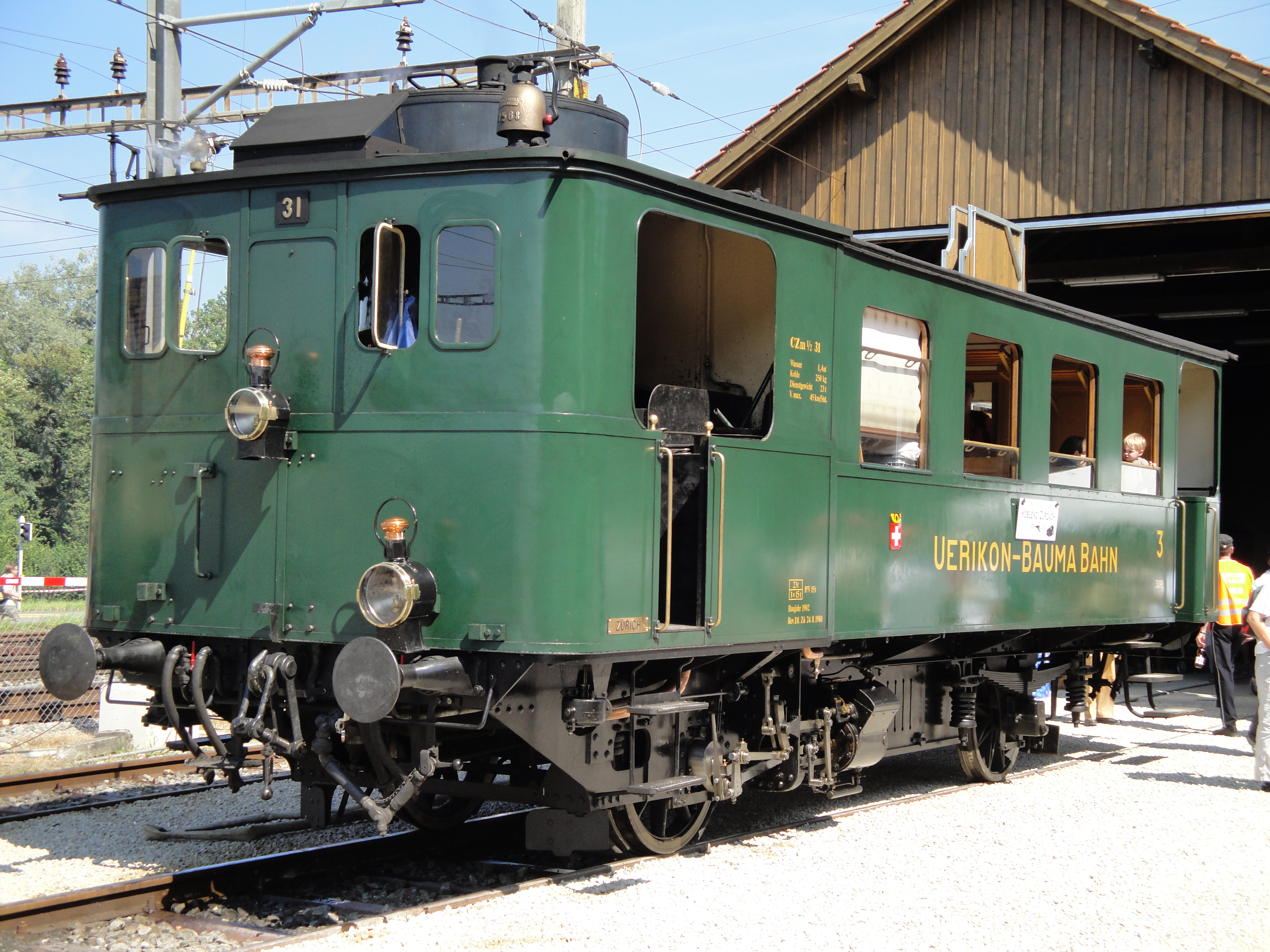
The CZm 1/2 steam railcar that formerly provided passenger service

The Uerikon to Bauma railway opened in 1901 and was the brain child of Adolf Guyer-Zeller, who would become famous as the builder of the Jungfrau Railway. The line provided a link between Uerikon, on the shores of Lake Zurich, and the Zürcher Oberland, including the town of Bäretswil where he owned a textile mill.

Traffic on the line was never great, and for most trains a single steam railcar sufficed. There were never sufficient funds to electrify the line. In 1946 it was decided the UeBB, together with the Uster-Oetwil-Bahn and Wetzikon-Meilen-Bahn lines, was to be converted to bus operation by the newly formed Verkehrsbetriebe Zürichsee und Oberland (VZO). The line from Uerikon to Hinwil was abandoned in 1948. The line from Bubikon to Hinwil is mostly dismantled, although a short section is still retained and in use as a freight siding. The line from Bubikon to Wolfhausen as of 2018 still exists and was used for the freight traffic for many years. However, as of 2016 it is no longer connected to the main railway network at Bubikon. The line from Wolfhausen to Uerikon is also disassembled.

By contrast, the section between Hinwil and Bauma was acquired by the Swiss Federal Railways and electrified. However it did not prosper, and passenger services ceased in 1979. Ownership of the section from Bäretswil to Bauma was transferred to the DVZO for use as a heritage railway in 2000. The section from Hinwil to Bäretswil remained in Swiss Federal Railway ownership until 2018, when it was sold to the Sursee-Triengen-Bahn. The Sursee-Triengen-Bahn leased the Bäretswil to Bauma section from the DVZO in 2019, giving it complete control of the infrastructure. The line continues to see freight trains as well as DVZO heritage trains.

== Route ==
The line commenced at Uerikon station, on the Lake Zurich right-bank line. After leaving the station, the line immediately started climbing as far as Hombrechtikon station and, in places, enjoyed a fine view of the lake. Beyond Hombrechtikon the route to Bubikon was almost horizontal, passing through Wolfhausen station.

At Bubikon station, the UeBB crossed the Wallisellen to Uster and Rapperswil line. From Bubikon, the line served Dürnten station before swinging sharply north to Hinwil station.

Besides being an intermediate station on the UeBB, Hinwil station was, and is, terminus of the Effretikon to Hinwil line. From here to the end of the line, the landscape is hilly, necessitating viaducts and bridges to cross deep valleys. Intermediate stations are served at Ettenhausen-Emmetschloo, Bäretswil and Neuthal.

The end of the line is reached at Bauma station, which is on the Tösstal line from Rapperswil to Winterthur.
