= Dampfbahn-Verein Zürcher Oberland =

Steam railway company in the canton of Zürich in Switzerland

Coordinates: 47.3686°N 8.8805°E

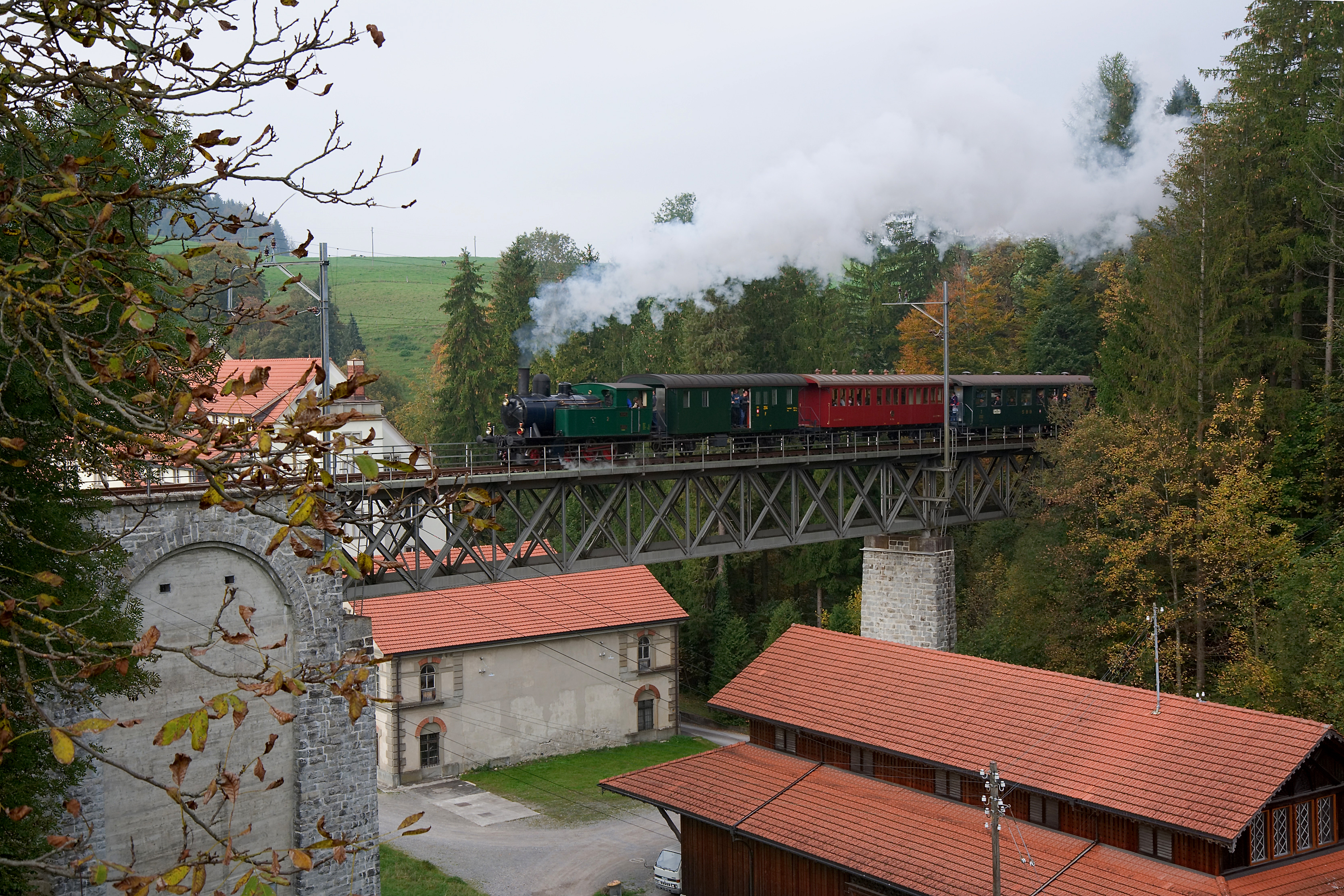
- A steam train of the DVZO crosses the Weissenbachbrücke near Neuthal

Overview
- Headquarters: Bauma
- Locale: Canton of Zürich, Switzerland
- Dates of operation: 1978–present

Technical
- Track gauge: 1,435 mm (4 ft 8 1/2 in) standard gauge
- Length: 11.3 km (7.0 mi)

The Dampfbahn-Verein Zürcher Oberland (DVZO), lit. 'steam train association of Zürcher Oberland', is a heritage railway association based in the Swiss canton of Zürich. It owns historic locomotives and coaches and operates railway services between the towns of Hinwil and Bauma most Sundays from May to October, in addition to charter services on the whole Swiss railway network.

== Operation ==
The association preserves various items of rolling stock, utilising the historic lok remise or engine shed at Uster station, and also operates the preserved railway between Hinwil and Bauma stations over a section of the former Uerikon to Bauma railway (UeBB).

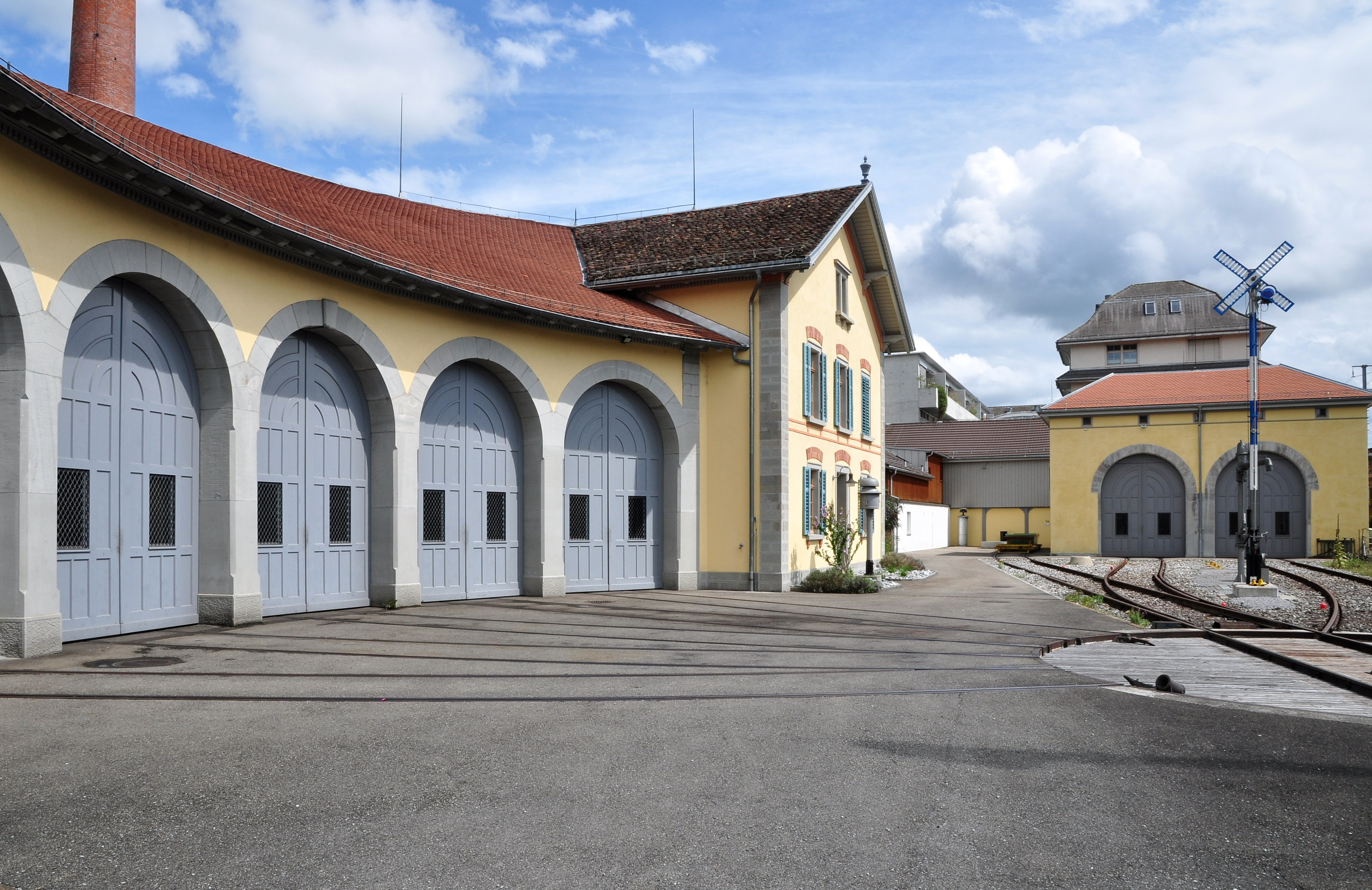
The lok remise next to Uster station

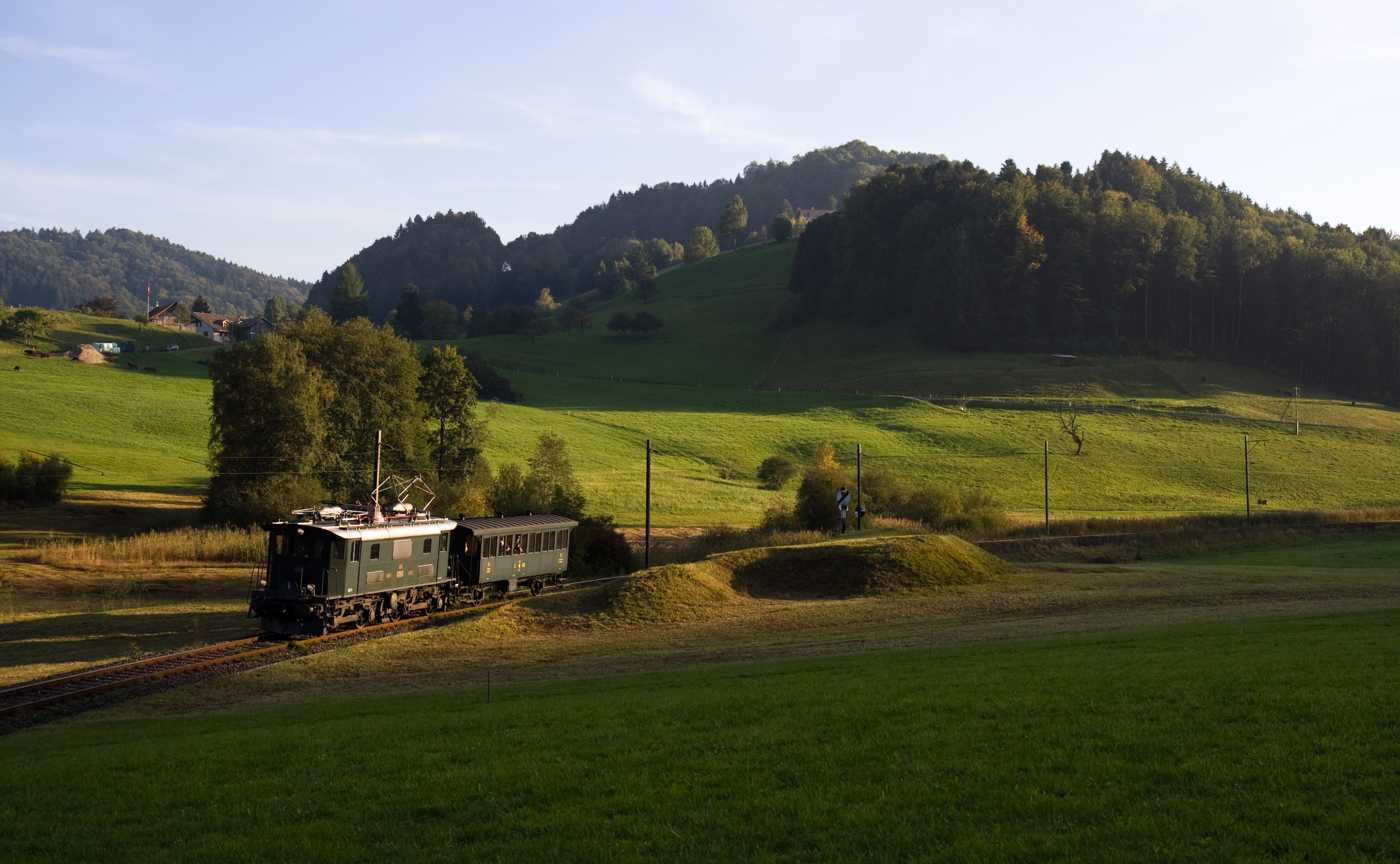
Be 4/4 electric locomotive and coach between Bäretswil and Neuthal

=== Route ===
The single-tracked route leads from Hinwil, the terminus of the Effretikon–Hinwil railway line, over the Uerikon–Bauma railway line to Bauma on the intersection with the Tösstal railway line, with intermediate stops at Ettenhausen-Emmetschloo, Bäretswil and Neuthal. Between, Neuthal and Bauma, the line exhibits its steepest grade of 29,2‰. The entire line is electrified with 15 kV 16,7 Hz.

=== Rolling stock ===
DVZO preserves historic steam locomotives (Ed 3/4, Ed 3/3, BT Eb 3/5, E 3/3), electric locomotives (Be 4/4, Ee 3/3), switcher locomotives, goods wagons and passenger coaches. The association also operates historic busses.

=== Schedule ===
Railway services only operate during the warmer seasons. As of 2024, steam locomotive powered trains operate every first and third Sunday between May and July, while electric locomotive powered trains operate on the first and third Sunday of August. In September and October, trains operate every Sunday (all pulled by steam locomotives).

== History ==
The association was founded after Swiss Federal Railways terminated all passenger railway services between Hinwil and Bäretswil on 1 June 1969 (cargo trains continued to use the route between Hinwil and Bäretswil).

Since 6 May 1978, the association operates heritage railway services between Hinwil and Bauma during the warmer months. Since summer 2000, the section between Bauma and Bäretswil is owned by DVZO. It was acquired for the symbolic price of 1 Swiss Franc.

== See also ==
- List of heritage railways and funiculars in Switzerland
- History of rail transport in Switzerland
