= Bäretswil =

- Municipality
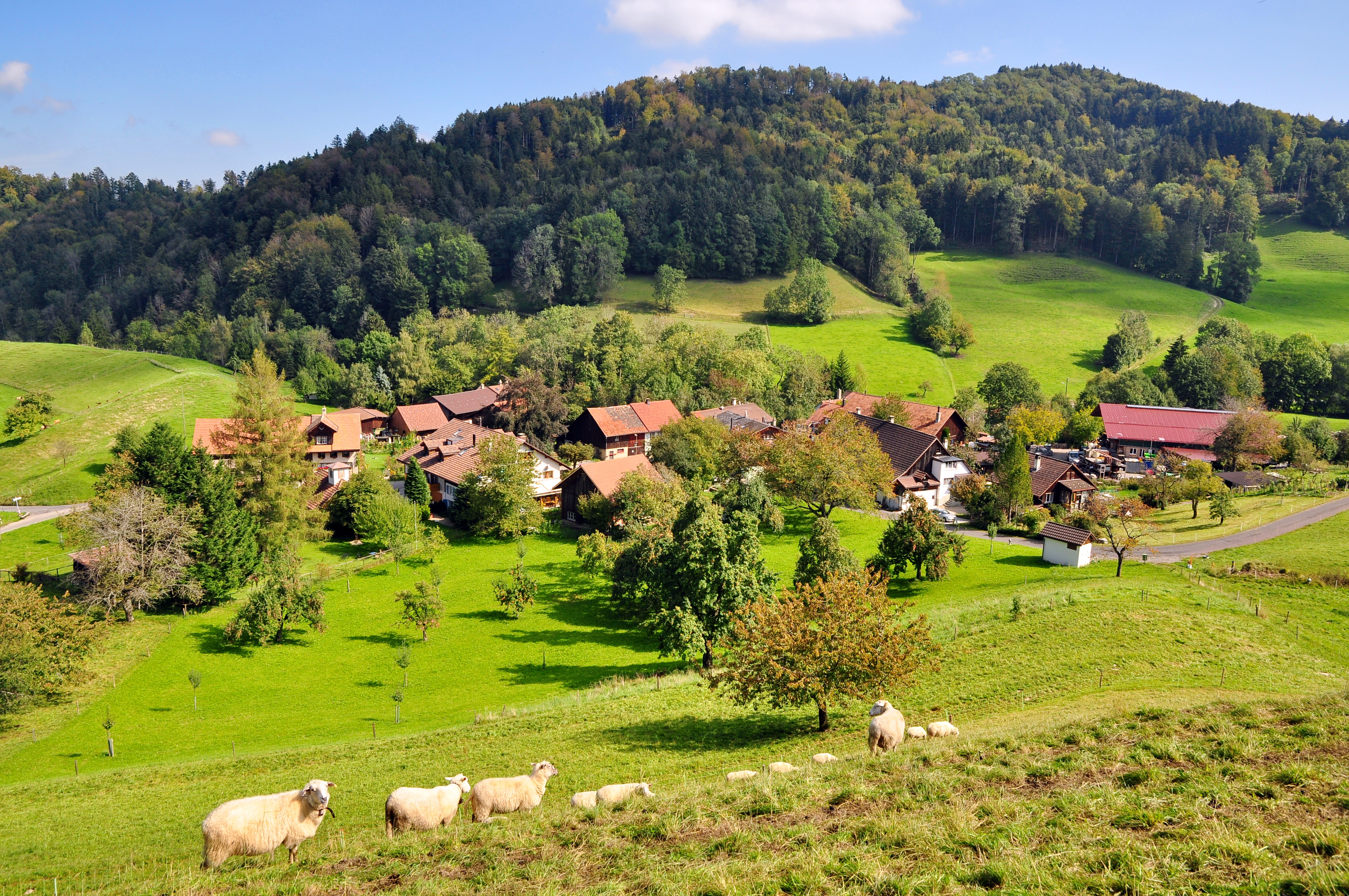

- Flag Coat of arms
- Location of Bäretswil
- Location within Switzerland Location within Canton of Zurich
- Coordinates: 47°20′N 8°51′E
- Country: Switzerland
- Canton: Zurich
- District: Hinwil

Area
  - Total: 22.23 km^{2} (8.58 sq mi)
- Elevation: 702 m (2,303 ft)
- Highest elevation (Allmen): 1,074 m (3,524 ft)
- Lowest elevation: 616 m (2,021 ft)

Population (December 2020)
  - Total: 5,052
  - Density: 227.3/km^{2} (588.6/sq mi)
- Time zone: UTC+01:00 (CET)
  - Summer (DST): UTC+02:00 (CEST)
- Postal code: 8344
- SFOS number: 111
- ISO 3166 code: CH-ZH
- Localities: Bäretswil, Adetswil; Bettswil, Fehrenwaldsberg, Kleinbäretswil, Tisenwaldsberg, Wappenswil, Neuthal, Hof, Hinterburg, Tanne, Ghöch
- Surrounded by: Bauma, Fischenthal, Hinwil, Hittnau, Pfäffikon, Wetzikon
- Website: www.baeretswil.ch

Bäretswil is a municipality in the district of Hinwil in the canton of Zürich in Switzerland.

== History ==
Bäretswil is first mentioned in 741 as Berofovilare. In 745 it was mentioned as Perolfeswilari.

== Geography ==
Aerial view from 400 m by Walter Mittelholzer (1922)

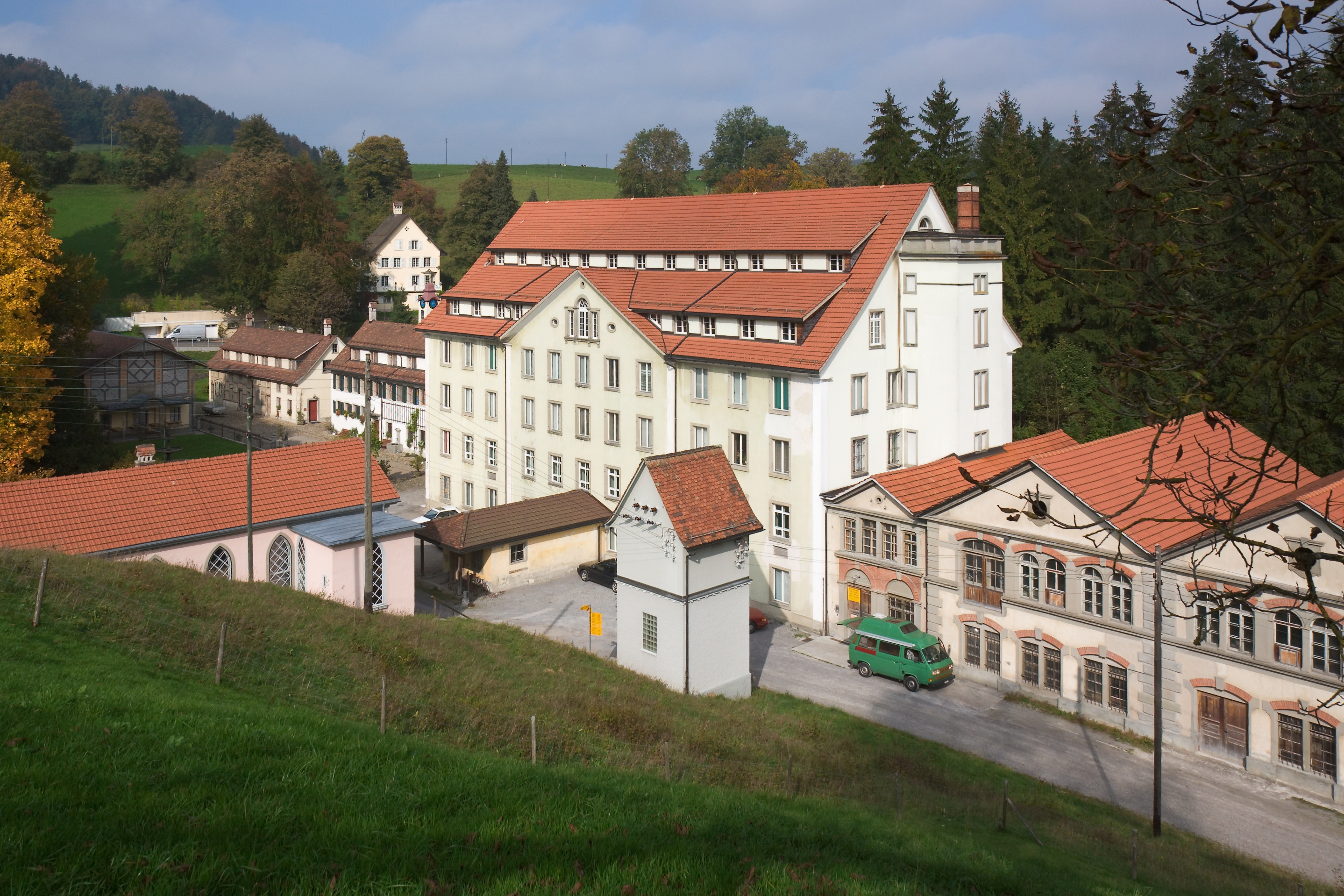
Cotton mill in the Neuthal section of Bäretswil

Bäretswil has an area of 22.2 km^{2} (8.6 sq mi). Of this area, 51.5% is used for agricultural purposes, while 39.1% is forested. Of the rest of the land, 8.2% is settled (buildings or roads) and the remainder (1.2%) is non-productive (rivers, glaciers or mountains). In 1996 housing and buildings made up 5.4% of the total area, while transportation infrastructure made up the rest (2.8%). Of the total unproductive area, water (streams and lakes) made up 0.2% of the area. As of 2007 4.7% of the total municipal area was undergoing some type of construction.

The municipality is located in the hills between the Glatt and Töss Valleys. It includes the villages of Bäretswil and Adetswil as well as the hamlets of Bettswil, Wappenswil, Hof-Neuthal, Tanne and Klein Bäretswil and scattered individual homes.

The old cotton mill, pictured, now houses museums of spinning and weaving machinery.

== Demographics ==
Bäretswil has a population (as of 31 December 2020) of 5,052. As of 2007, 8.9% of the population was made up of foreign nationals. As of 2008 the gender distribution of the population was 49.9% male and 50.1% female. Over the last 10 years the population has grown at a rate of 10.2%. Most of the population (as of 2000) speaks German (93.9%), with Italian being second most common ( 1.7%) and Albanian being third ( 1.3%).

In the 2007 election, the most popular party was the SVP which received 46.2% of the vote. The next three most popular parties were the CSP (16.8%), the SPS (9%) and the FDP (8.3%).

The age distribution of the population (as of 2000) is children and teenagers (0–19 years old) make up 26.7% of the population, while adults (20–64 years old) make up 62.4% and seniors (over 64 years old) make up 10.9%. The entire Swiss population is generally well educated. In Bäretswil about 80.3% of the population (between age 25-64) have completed either non-mandatory upper secondary education or additional higher education (either university or a Fachhochschule). There are 1649 households in Bäretswil.

Bäretswil has an unemployment rate of 1.37%. As of 2005, there were 204 people employed in the primary economic sector and about 73 businesses involved in this sector. 312 people are employed in the secondary sector and there are 70 businesses in this sector. 549 people are employed in the tertiary sector, with 120 businesses in this sector. As of 2007 47.6% of the working population were employed full-time, and 52.4% were employed part-time.

As of 2008 there were 898 Catholics and 2444 Protestants in Bäretswil. In the 2000 census, religion was broken down into several smaller categories. From the 2000 census, 60.4% were some type of Protestant, with 56.1% belonging to the Swiss Reformed Church and 4.3% belonging to other Protestant churches. 22.1% of the population were Catholic. Of the rest of the population, 0% were Muslim, 3.4% belonged to another religion (not listed), 2.9% did not give a religion, and 10.7% were atheist or agnostic.

The historical population is given in the following table:

year	population
1470	45 households
1629	1,244/494^{a}
1723	1,216
1771	2,698
1810	3,549
1850	3,237
1900	2,698
1941	2,317
1970	2,733
1990	3,782

^a Population before and after the plague.

== Transport ==
The municipality had two railway stations, Bäretswil and Neuthal, on the Uerikon–Bauma line. There is no longer regular service on this line, but the Dampfbahn-Verein Zürcher Oberland heritage railway operates seasonal excursion service.
