= Bauma railway station =

Railway station in the canton of Zürich, Switzerland

Bauma
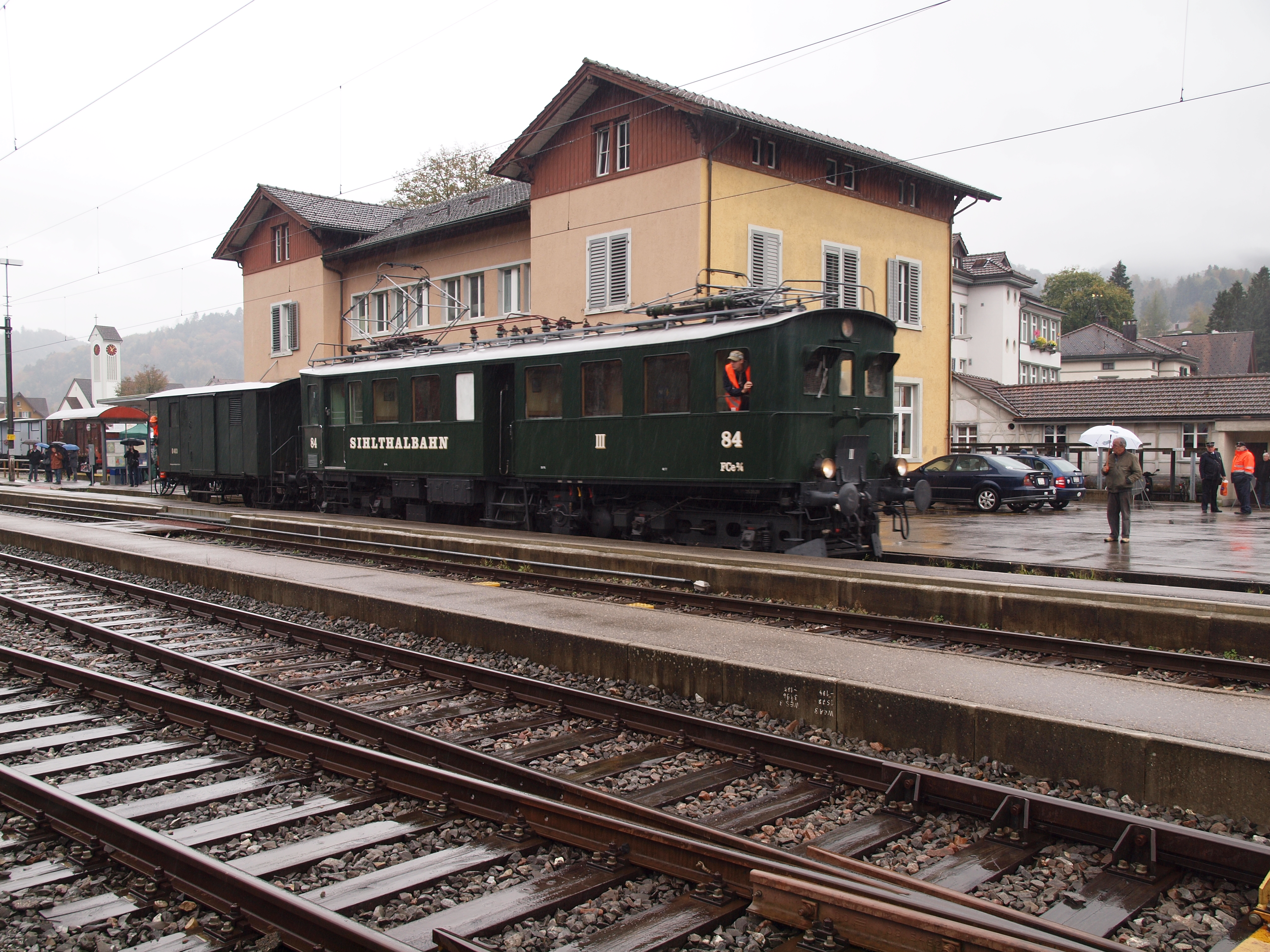
- Bauma station, with a visiting preserved railcar, 2010

General information
- Location: Bahnhofstrasse; Bauma, Canton of Zurich; Switzerland
- Coordinates: 47°22′08″N 8°52′42″E
- Elevation: 639 m (2,096 ft)
- Owner: Swiss Federal Railways
- Lines: Tösstal line; Uerikon–Bauma line
- Distance: 25.3 km (15.7 mi) from Uerikon; 25.2 km (15.7 mi) from Winterthur
- Train operators: Thurbo; Dampfbahn-Verein Zürcher Oberland
- Connections: PostAuto bus routes 809 835 837; VZO bus routes 850 854; DVZO heritage trains

Other information
- Fare zone: 172 (ZVV)

Passengers
- 2018: 670 per weekday

Services
Preceding station	Zurich S-Bahn	Following station
Saland towards Winterthur	S26	Steg towards Rüti ZH
Preceding station	Dampfbahn-Verein Zürcher Oberland	Following station
Neuthal towards Hinwil	Uerikon–Bauma railway	Terminus
Location
- Location within Switzerland Location within Canton of Zurich

Bauma railway station (German: Bahnhof Bauma) is a railway station in the Swiss canton of Zurich and municipality of Bauma (Töss Valley). The station is situated at the junction of the Töss Valley railway line, which is still in full use, and the Uerikon to Bauma railway (UeBB), which is partly closed and partly used as a heritage railway. It lies within fare zone 172 of the Zürcher Verkehrsverbund (ZVV).

== Services ==
=== S-Bahn ===
Bauma station is regularly served by regional S-Bahn trains. It is an intermediate station on the Zurich S-Bahn route S26, which operates between Rüti ZH and Winterthur.

- Zurich S-Bahn S26: half-hourly service between Winterthur and Rüti ZH.

=== Heritage railway ===
Bauma station is also the terminus of the heritage railway services of the Dampfbahn-Verein Zürcher Oberland (DVZO), which operates to Hinwil, over the former UeBB, with trains normally hauled by steam locomotives. The UeBB line beyond Hinwil, towards Uerikon, was closed in 1948 and little now remains.

=== Bus ===
It is also served by buses of the Verkehrsbetriebe Zürichsee und Oberland (VZO) and Swiss PostBus service (PostAuto).

== Gallery ==
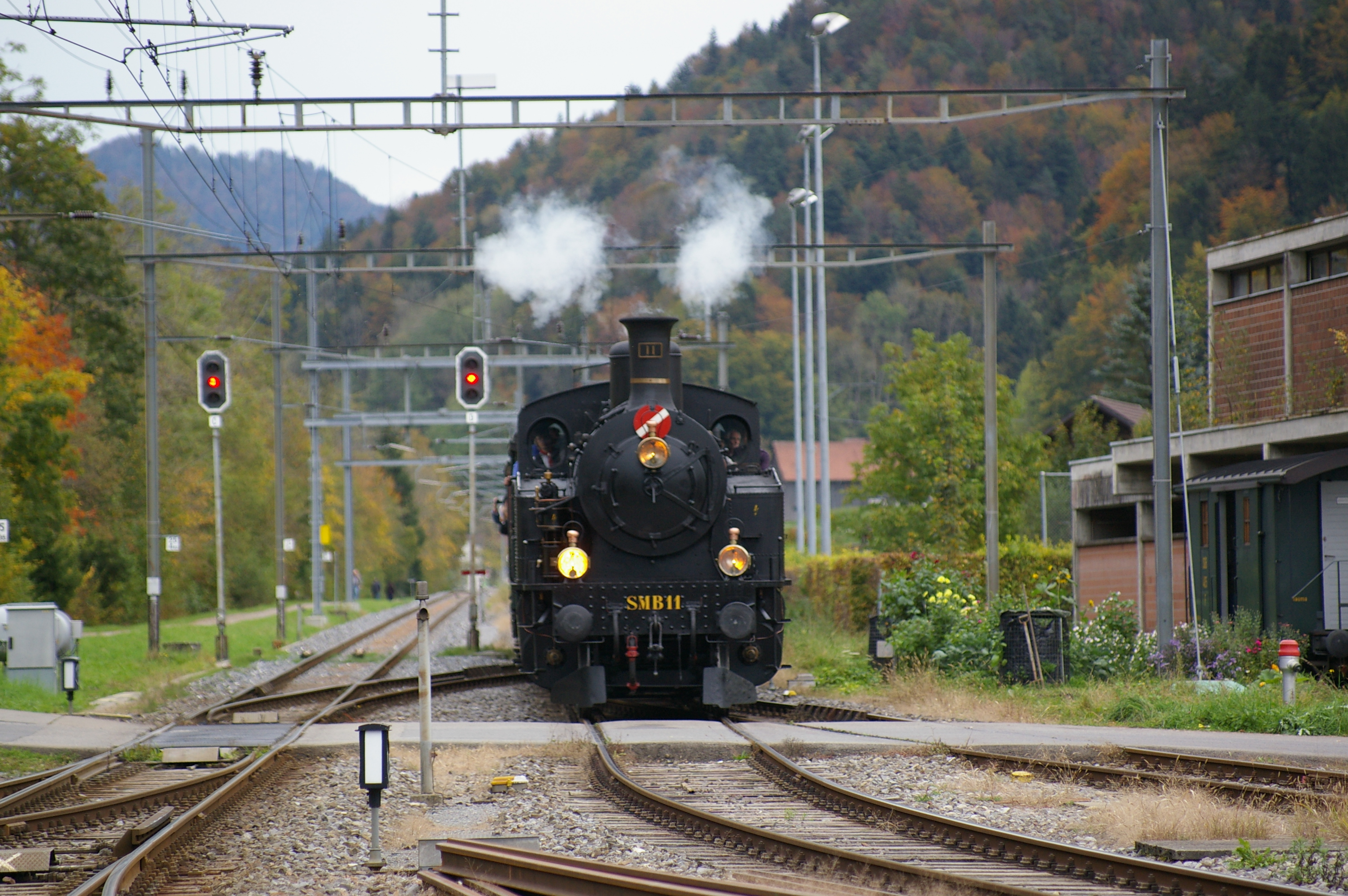
SMB Ec 4/5 11 at Bauma

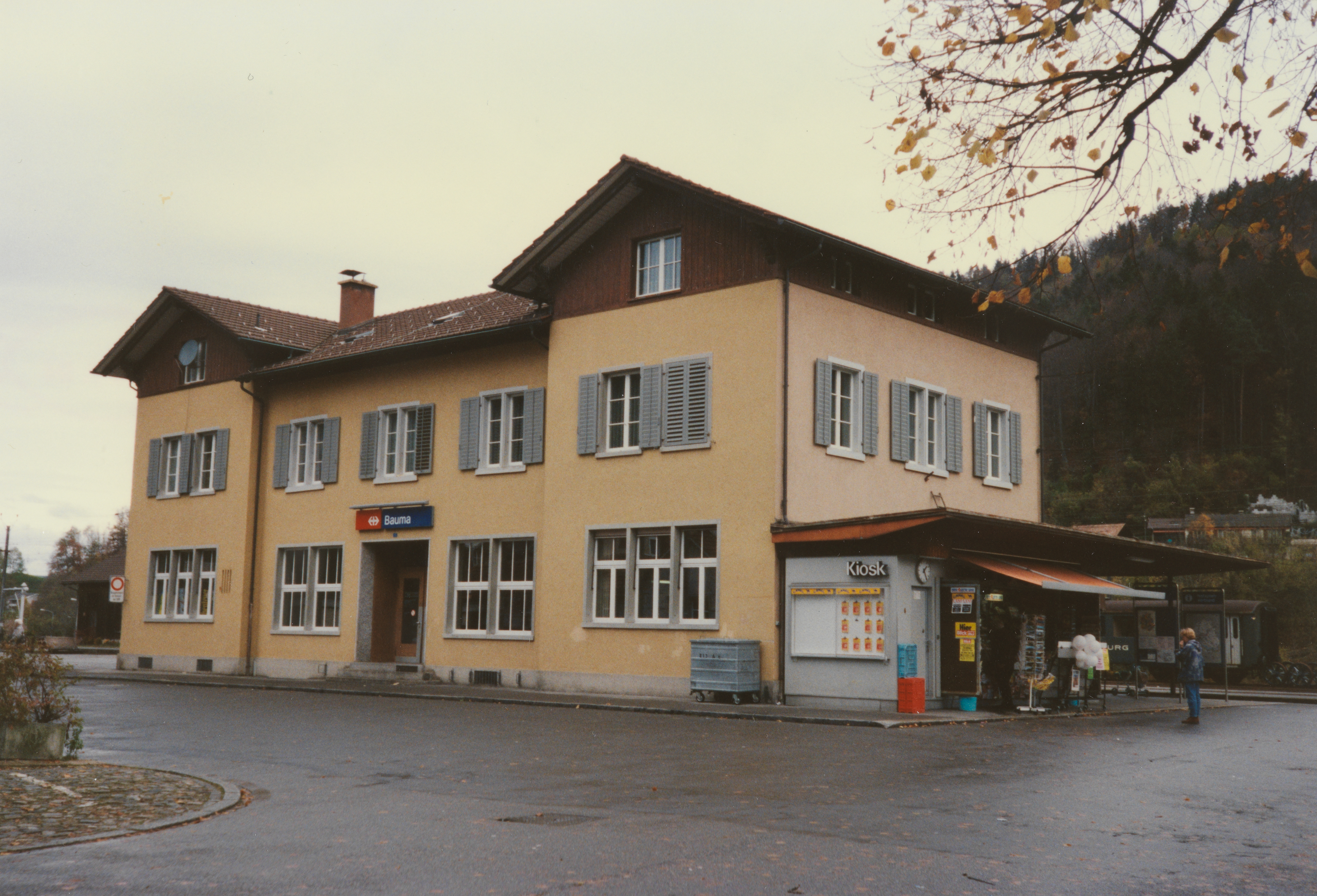
station building in 1994

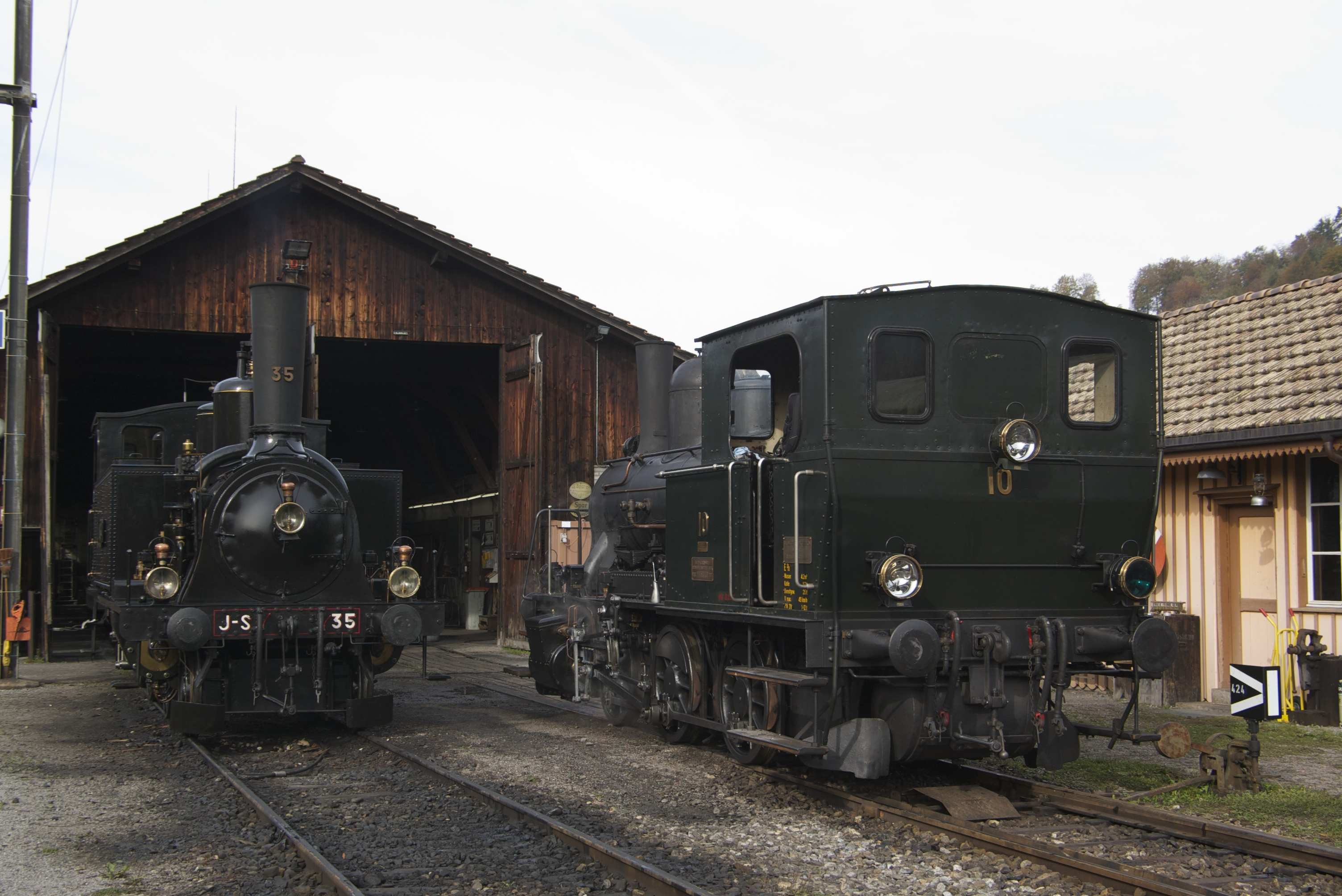
locomotive depot (2014)

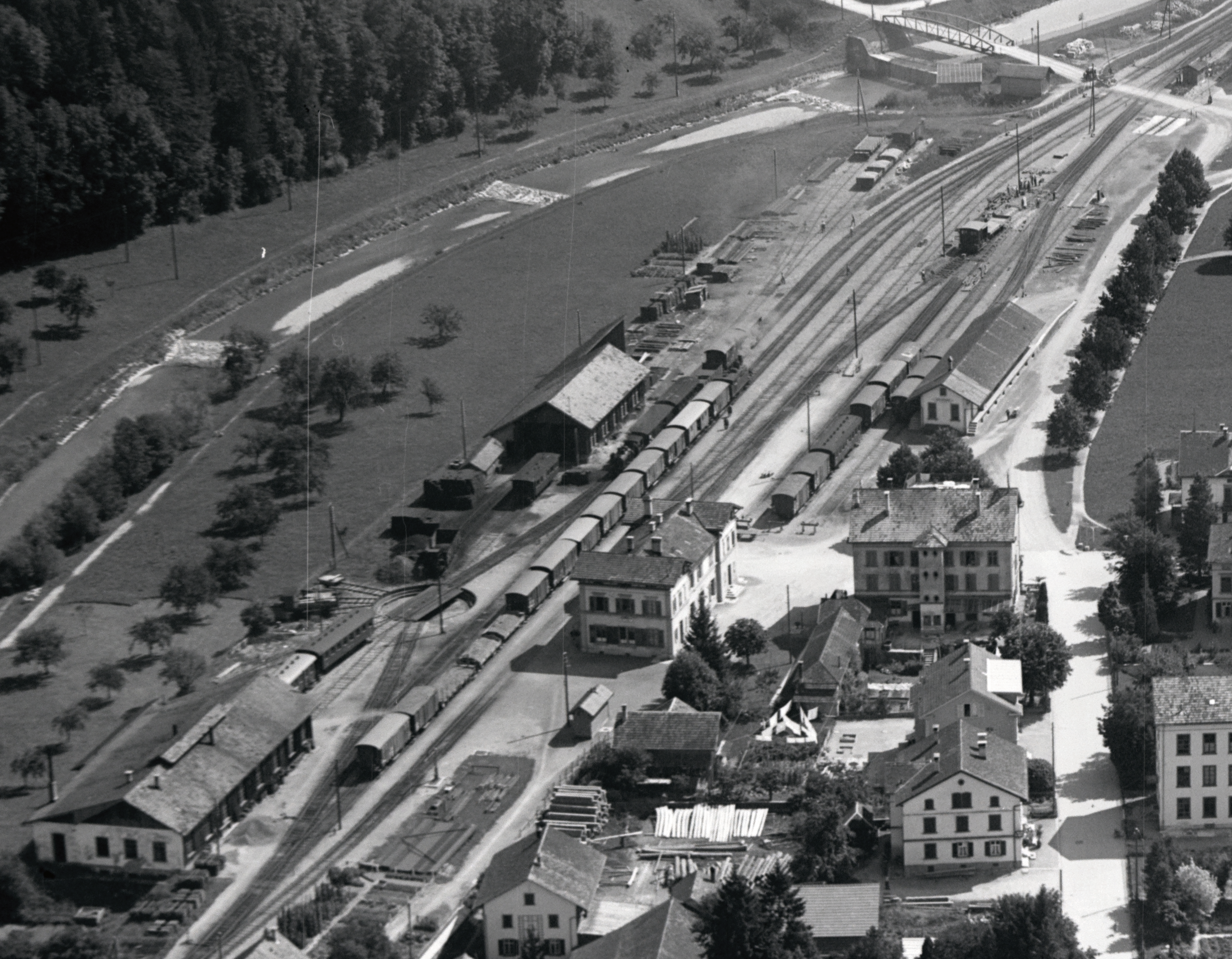
aerial view 1934

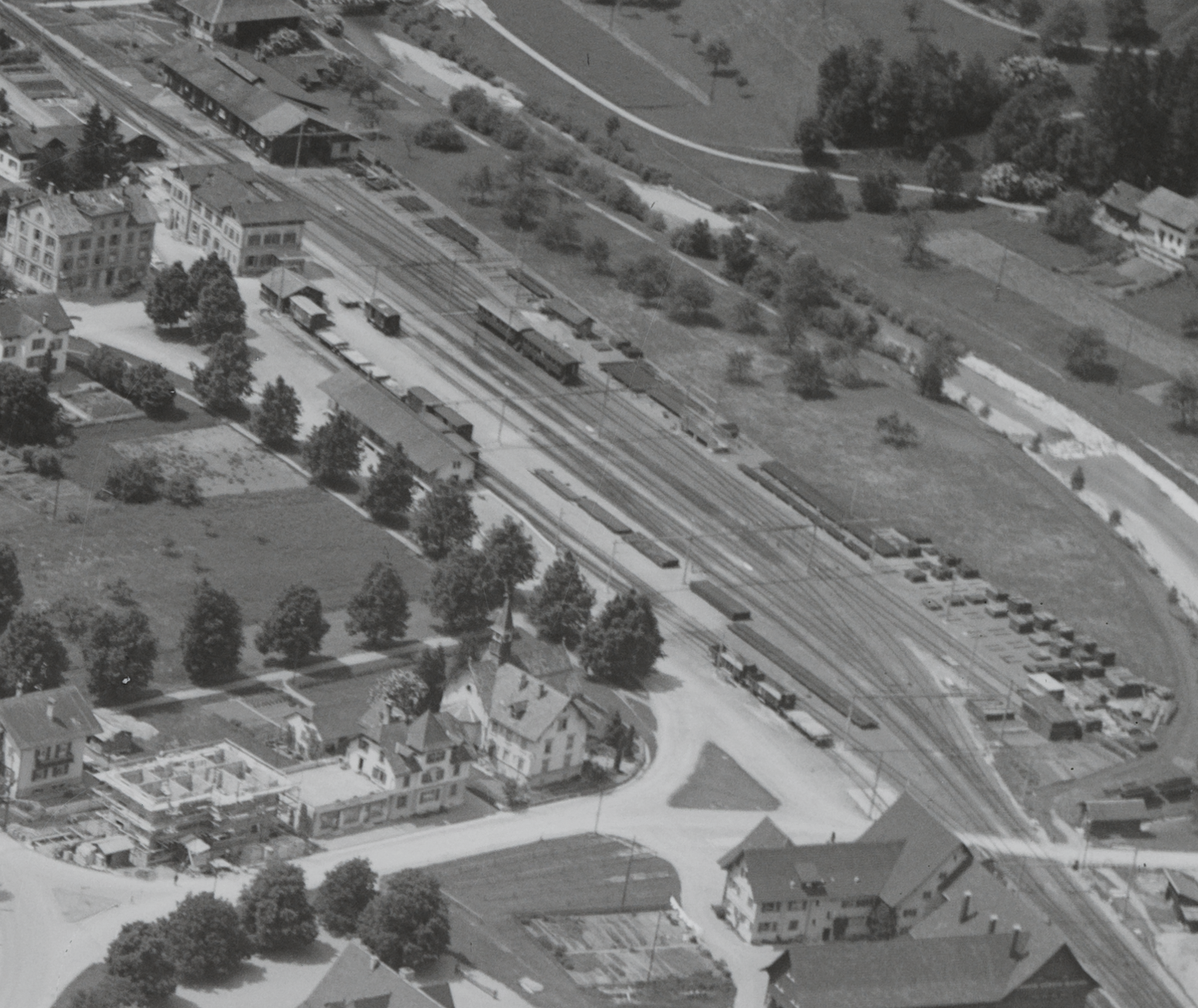
aerial view 1948

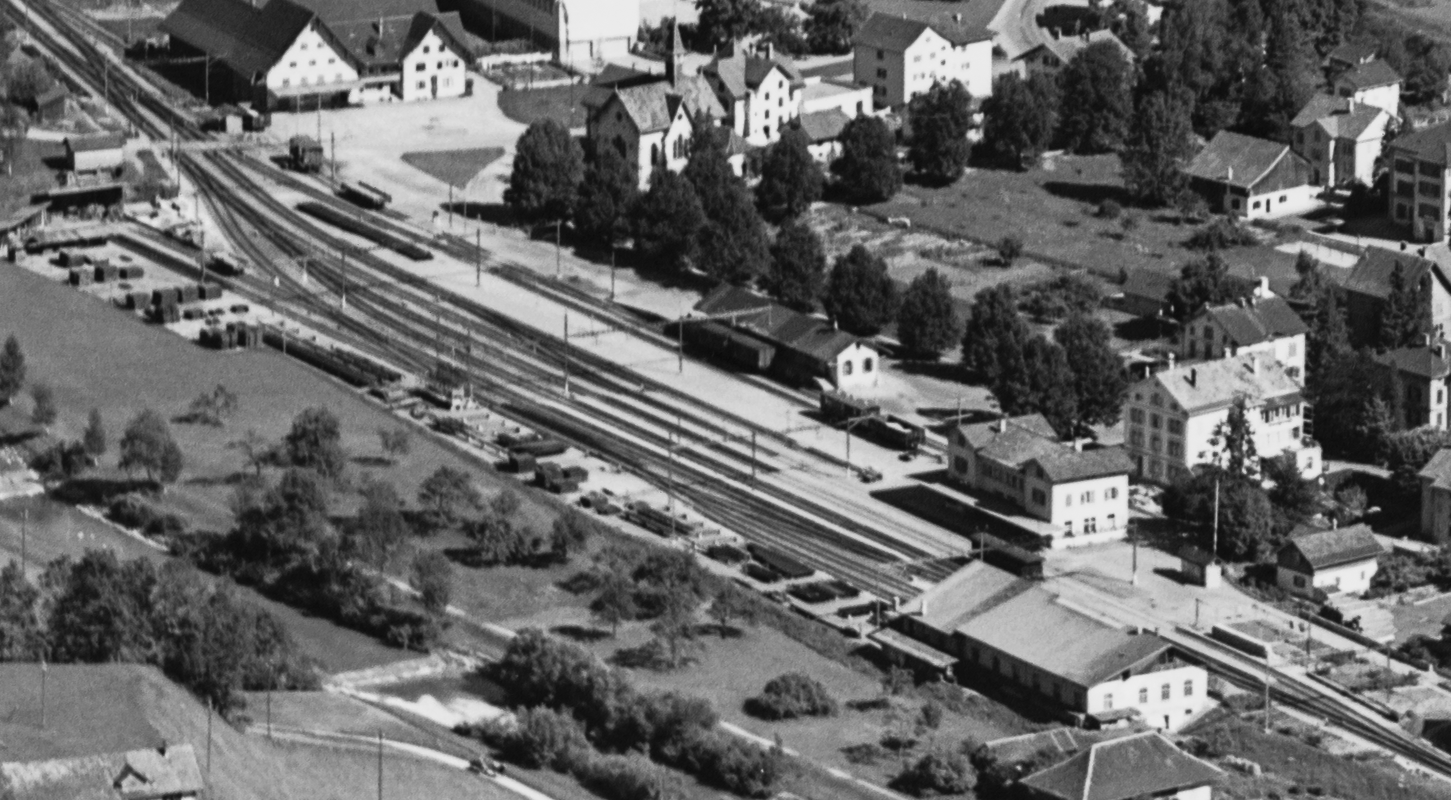
aerial view 1953

== See also ==
- History of rail transport in Switzerland
- Rail transport in Switzerland
