= Hinwil railway station =

Railway station in Switzerland

Hinwil
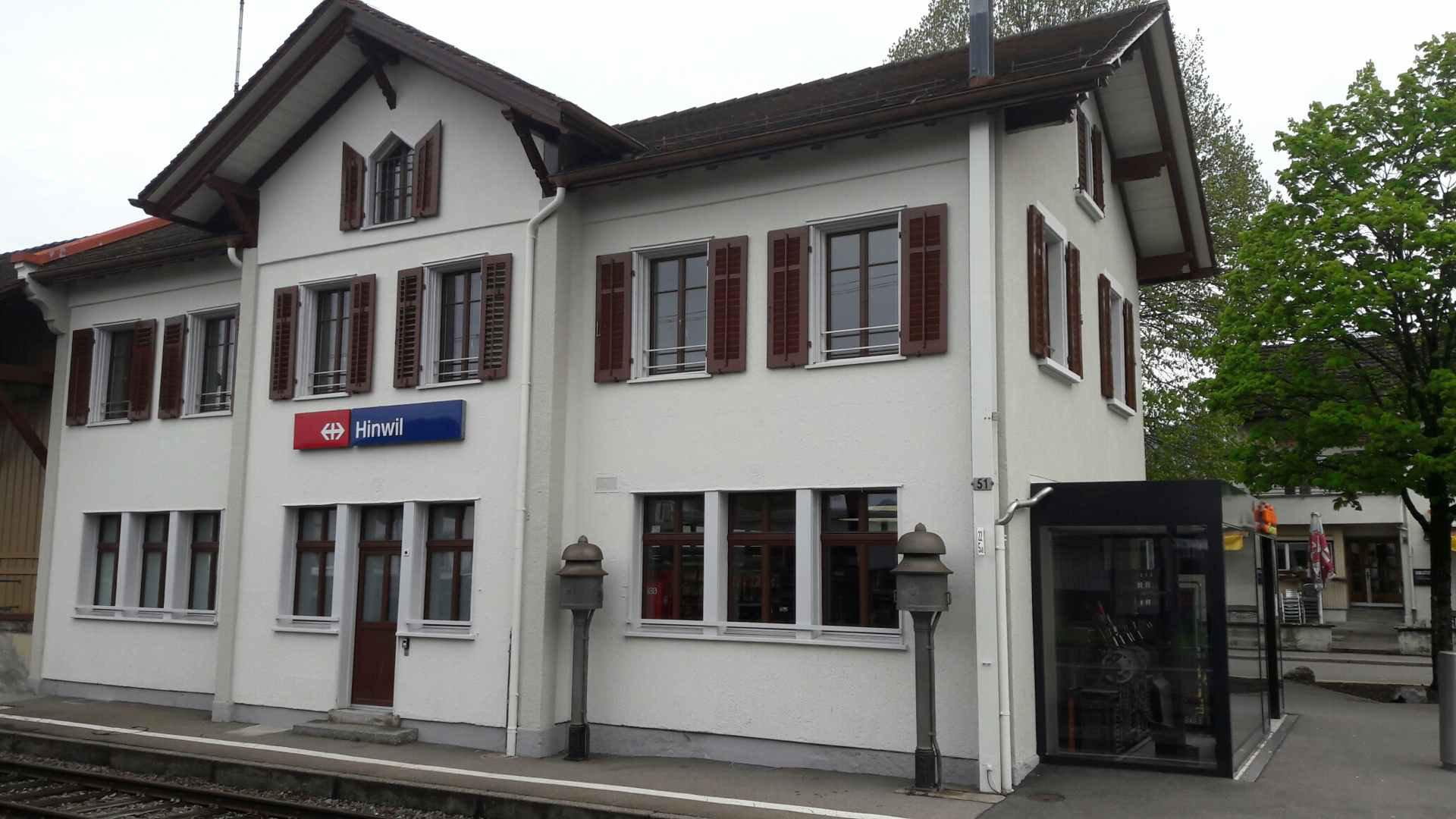
- The station building in 2017

General information
- Location: Bahnhofplatz, Hinwil, Canton of Zurich, Switzerland
- Coordinates: 47.2997°N 8.839231°E
- Elevation: 565 m (1,854 ft)
- Owner: Swiss Federal Railways
- Operator: Swiss Federal Railways; Dampfbahn-Verein Zürcher Oberland
- Line: Effretikon–Hinwil; Uerikon–Bauma
- Platforms: 1 island platform
- Tracks: 5
- Connections: VZO bus routes 869 870 871 875; DVZO heritage railway

Other information
- Fare zone: 133 (ZVV)

Services
Preceding station	Zurich S-Bahn	Following station
Wetzikon towards Affoltern am Albis	S14	Terminus
Preceding station	Dampfbahn-Verein Zürcher Oberland	Following station
Terminus	Uerikon–Bauma railway	Ettenhausen-Emmetschloo towards Bauma
Location
- Location within Switzerland Location within Canton of Zurich

Hinwil railway station (German: Bahnhof Hinwil) is a railway station in the municipality of Hinwil in the Oberland region of the canton of Zurich, Switzerland. The station is situated at the junction of the Effretikon to Hinwil via Wetzikon railway line, which is still in full use, and the Uerikon to Bauma railway (UeBB), which is partly closed and partly used as a heritage railway. The station lies within fare zone 133 of the Zürcher Verkehrsverbund (ZVV).

== Services ==
=== S-Bahn ===
Hinwil station is only served by S-Bahn trains. It is the terminus of Zurich S-Bahn route S14, which operates from Affoltern am Albis via Zurich, Uster and Wetzikon to Hinwil. As of the December 2018 timetable change, the following services stop at Hinwil:

- Zurich S-Bahn S14: half-hourly service to Affoltern am Albis via Zürich HB

=== Heritage trains ===
Hinwil station is also the terminus of services of the Dampfbahn-Verein Zürcher Oberland (DVZO), which operates trains to Bauma in the Töss Valley, over the former UeBB line (now a heritage railway), with trains normally hauled by steam locomotives. The UeBB line in the other direction, towards Uerikon, was closed in 1948 and little now remains.

== Gallery ==
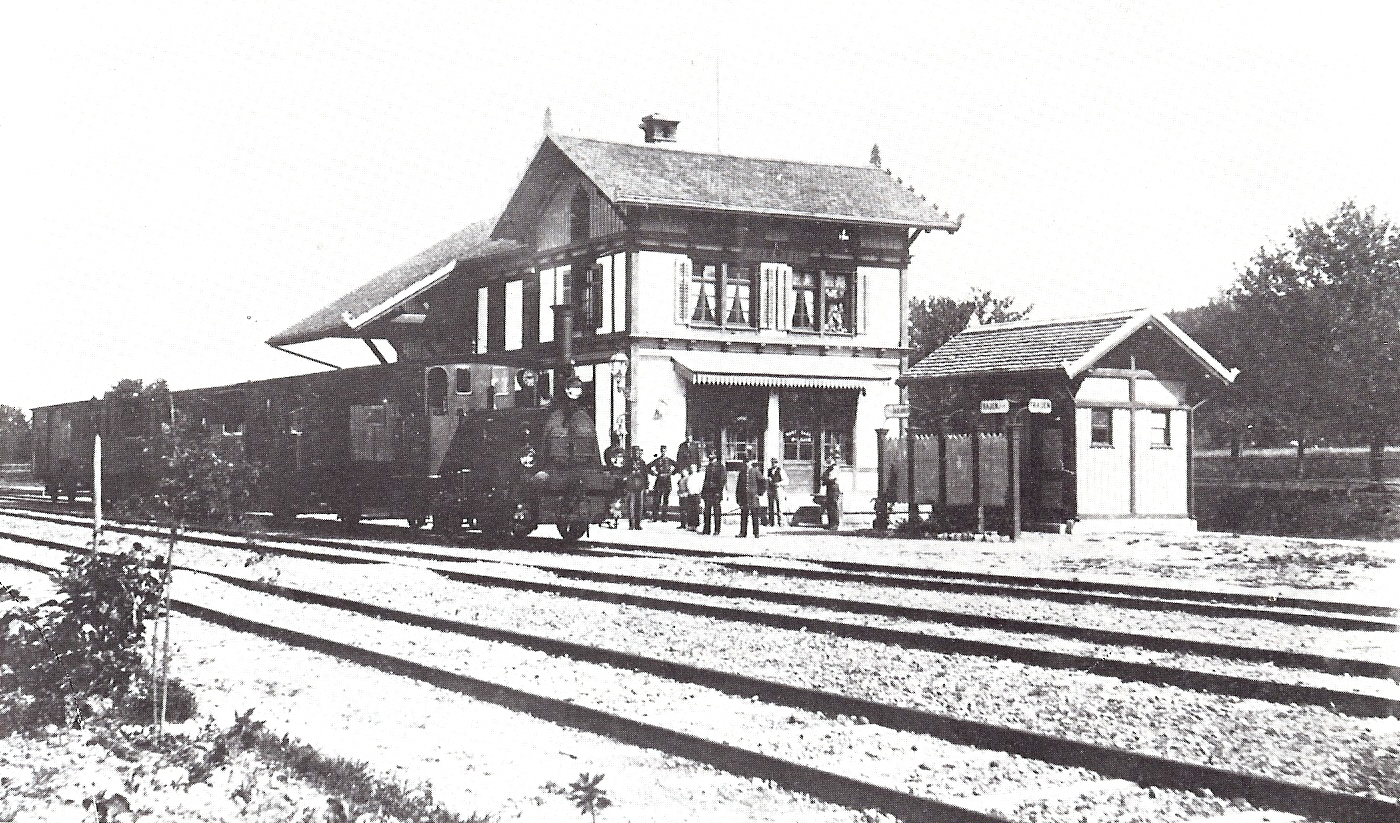
Hinwil station in 1877

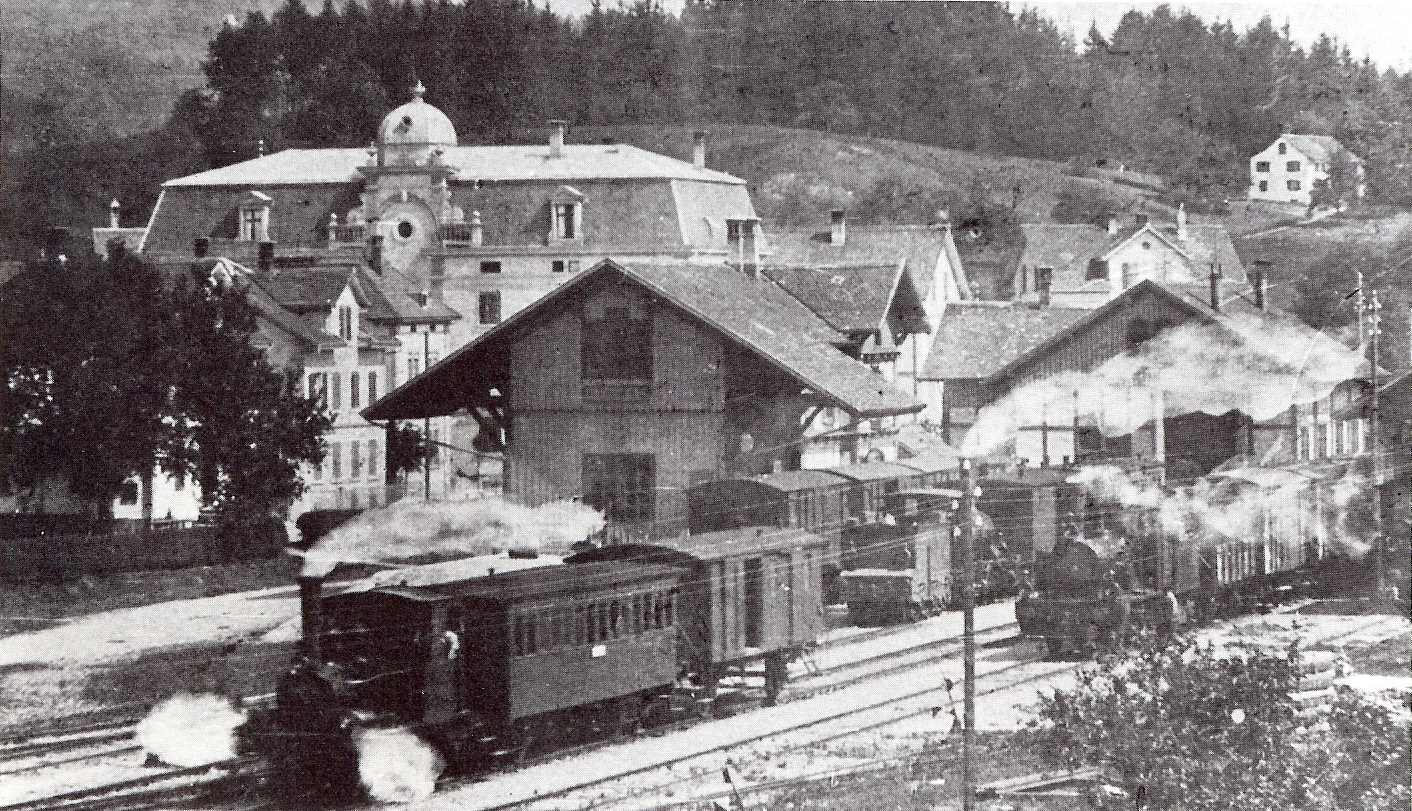
Hinwil station in 1902

== See also ==
- History of rail transport in Switzerland
- Rail transport in Switzerland
