= Hinwil =

- Municipality
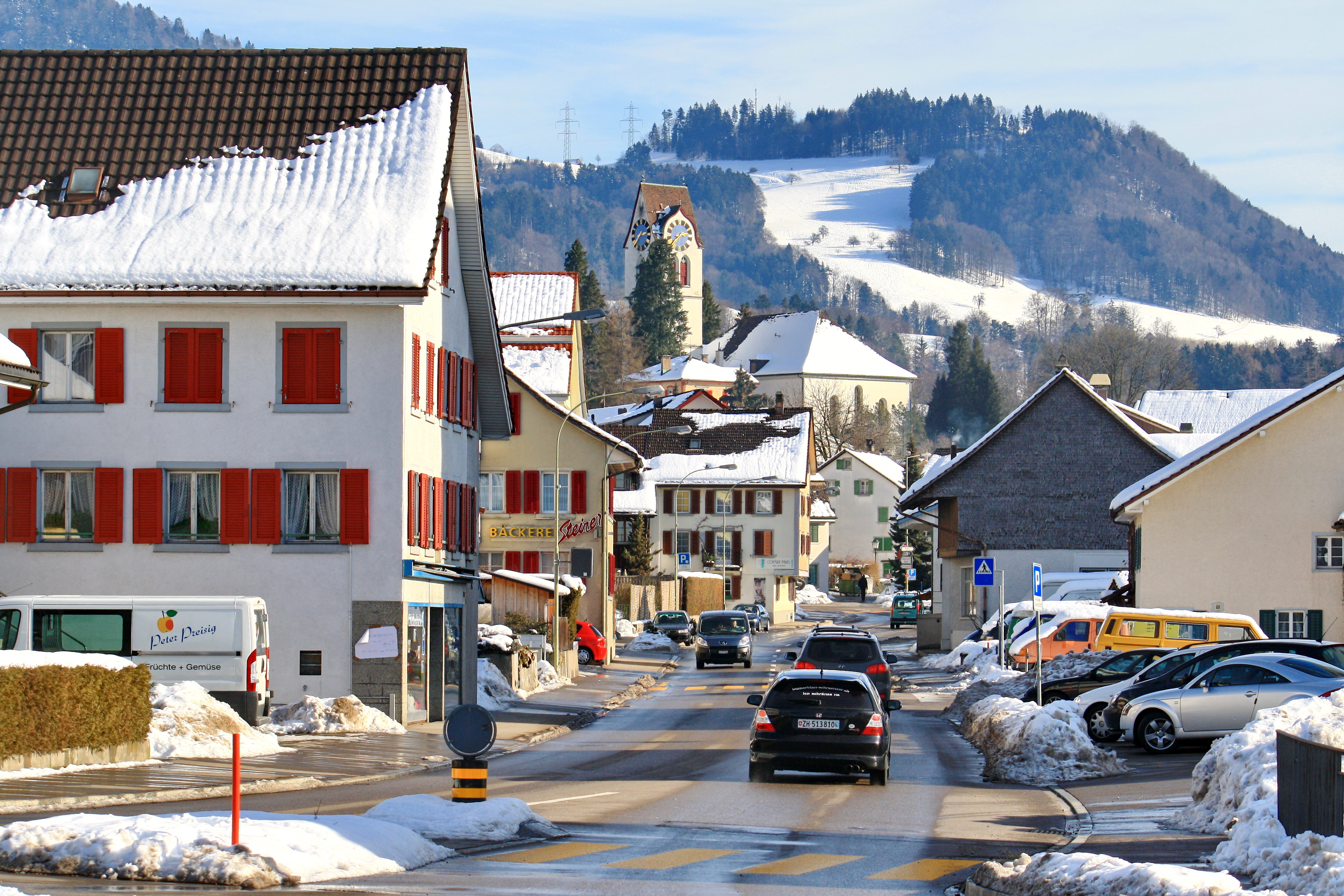

- Flag Coat of arms
- Location of Hinwil
- Location within Switzerland Location within Canton of Zurich
- Coordinates: 47°18′N 8°51′E
- Country: Switzerland
- Canton: Zurich
- District: Hinwil

Area
  - Total: 22.31 km^{2} (8.61 sq mi)
- Elevation: 565 m (1,854 ft)

Population (December 2020)
  - Total: 11,354
  - Density: 508.9/km^{2} (1,318/sq mi)
- Time zone: UTC+01:00 (CET)
  - Summer (DST): UTC+02:00 (CEST)
- Postal code: 8340
- SFOS number: 117
- ISO 3166 code: CH-ZH
- Localities: Girenbad, Hadlikon, Ringwil, Unterbach, Unterholz, Wernetshausen, Bossikon, Erlosen
- Surrounded by: Bäretswil, Bubikon, Dürnten, Fischenthal, Gossau, Wald, Wetzikon
- Twin towns: Jablonné nad Orlicí (Czech Republic)
- Website: www.hinwil.ch

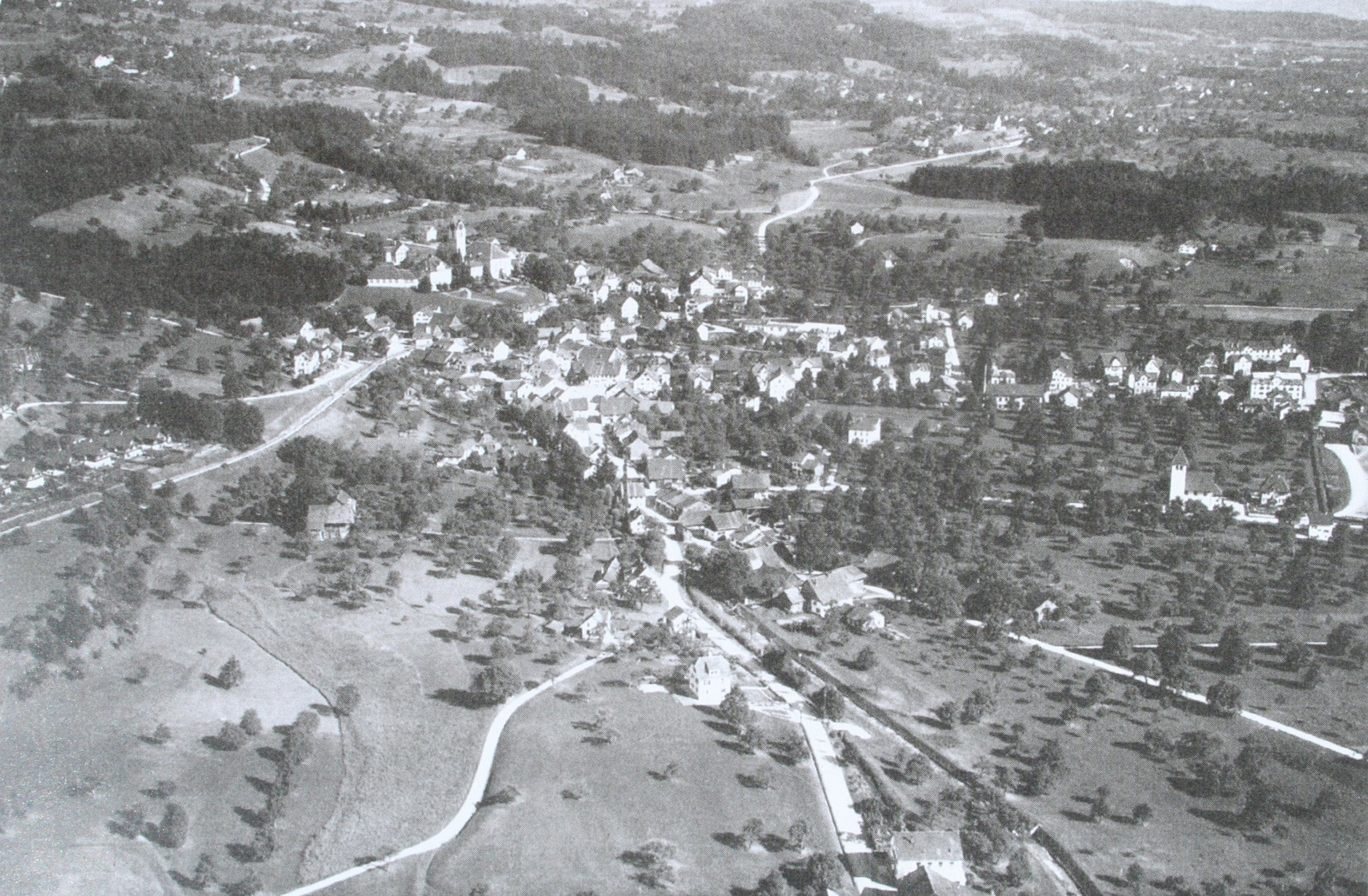
Aerial photography by Walter Mittelholzer (1928)

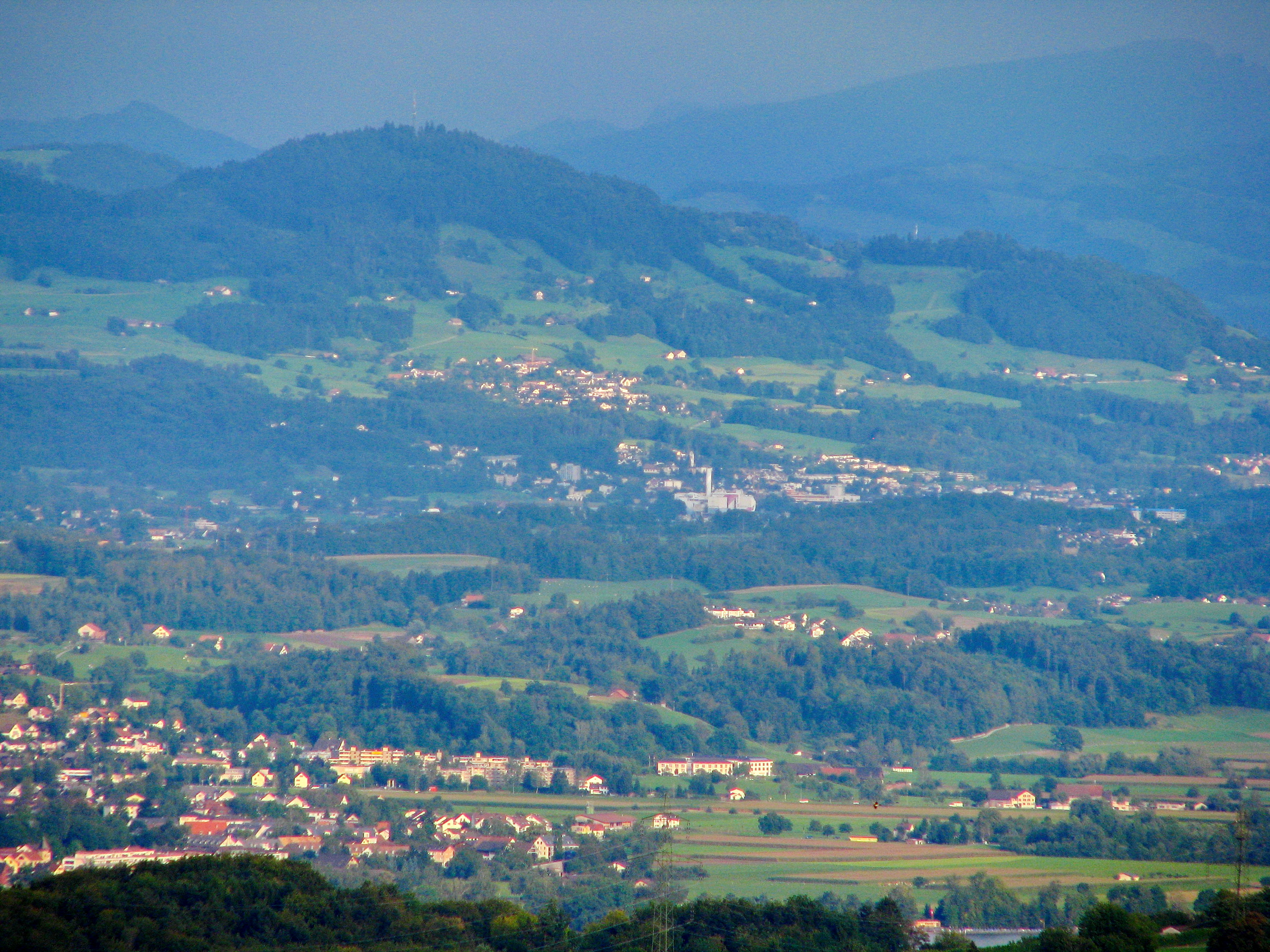
Hinwil as seen from Adlisberg in Zürich-Witikon (September 2009)

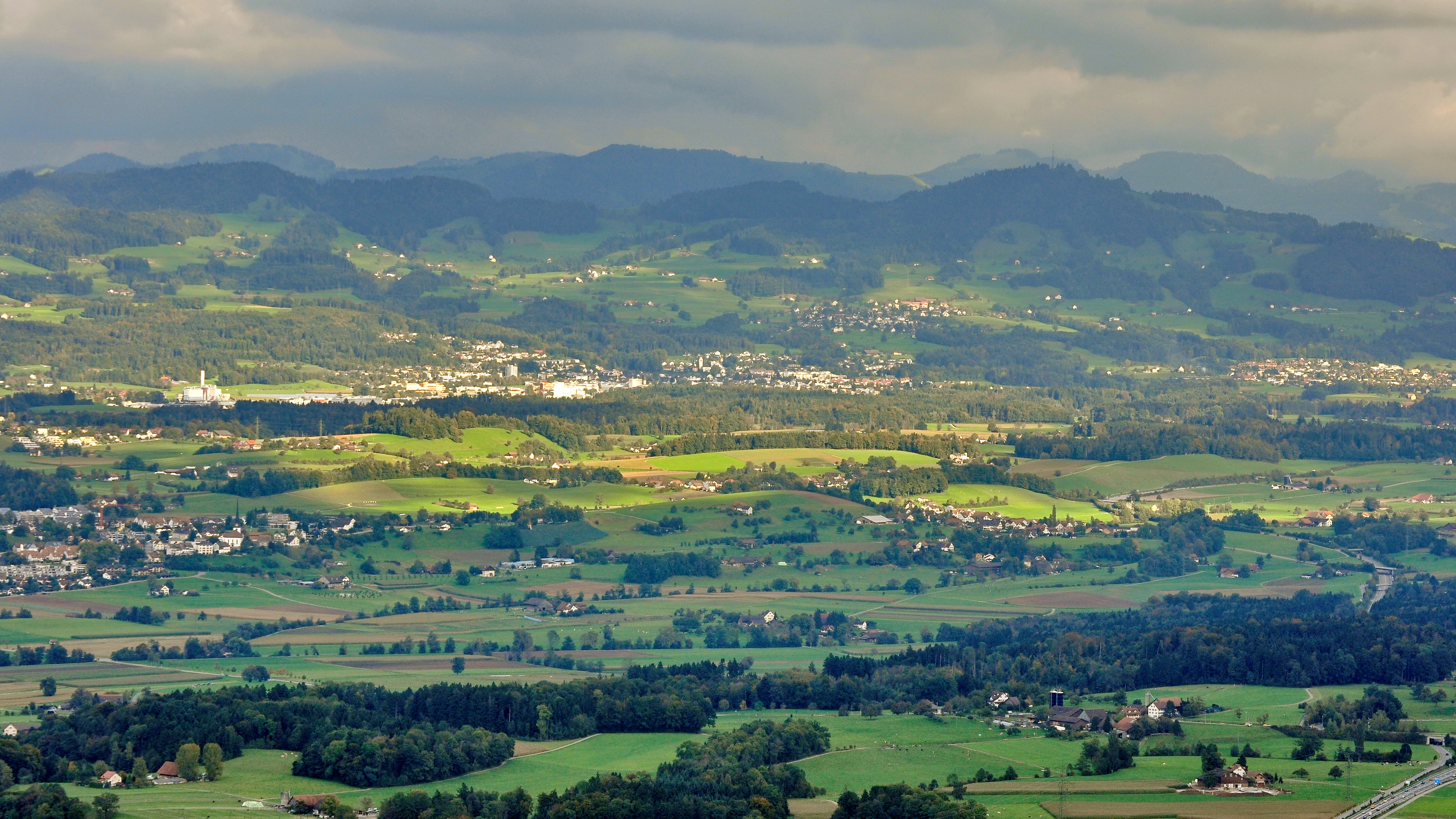
Hinwil as seen from Pfannenstiel, KEZO to the left (March 2010)

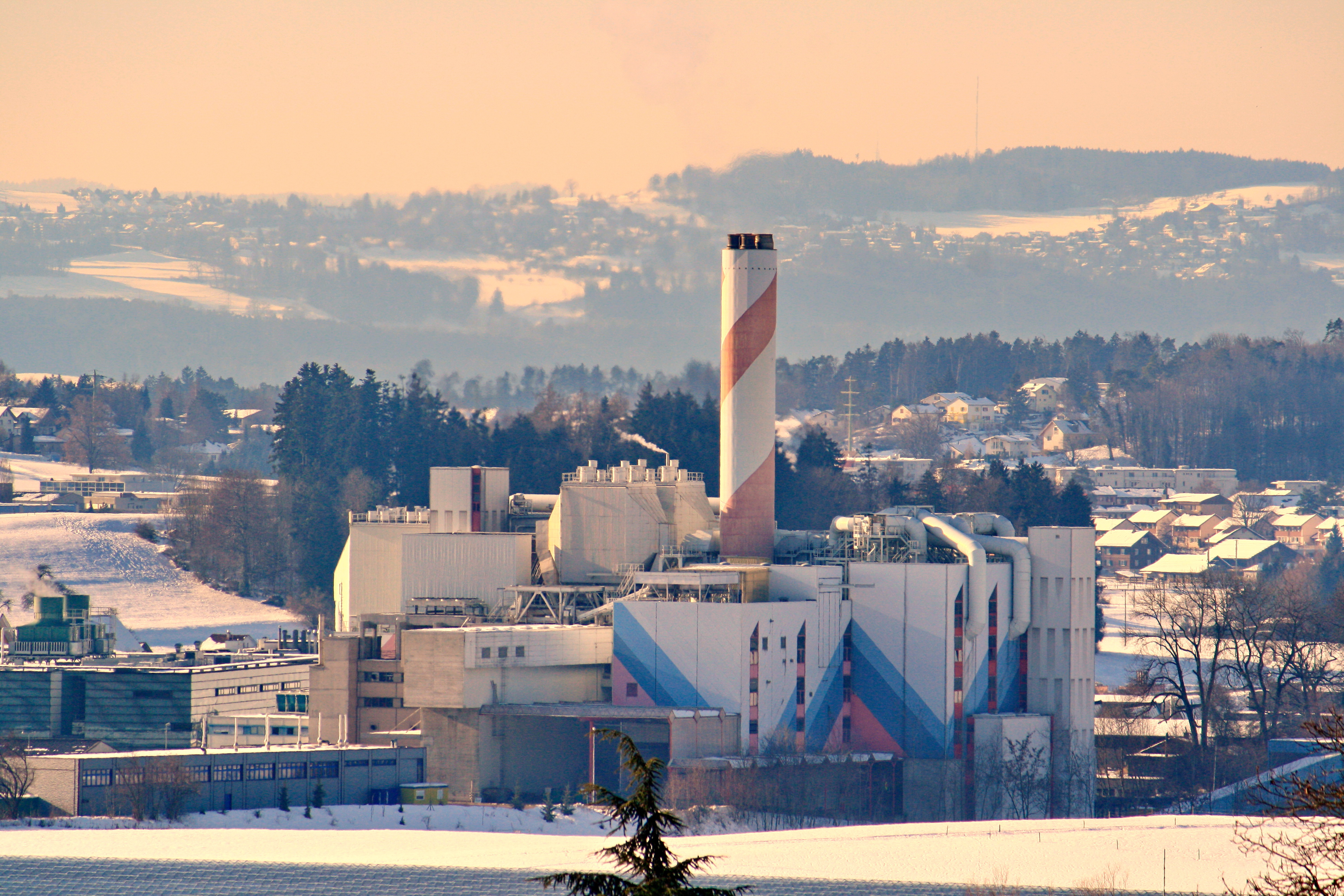
Kehrichtverbrennungsanlage Zürcher Oberland (KEZO)

Hinwil is a municipality in the district of Hinwil in the canton of Zürich in Switzerland.

== History ==
The village Hinwil from which the later municipality took its name is first mentioned in 745 as Hunichinwilari, in a donation made by Beata and Landolt to the Abbey of Saint Gall. Hinwil was part of an Alamannic colony comprising also adjoining villages and settlements that were donated during the following century by descendants of Beata and Landolt or by other members of their clan to the same abbey, such as Hadaleihinchova (Hadlikon, donated in 775), Pozinhova (Bossikon, 829), Rimolteswilare (Ringwil, donated together with a church in 837) and Werinholveshusa (Wernetshausen, 867).

The Alamanni were actually preceded by Roman inhabitants, as attested by the foundation walls of a Roman Villa dating from the 1st century CE and detected under the medieval church of Hinwil which is first mentioned in the second half of the 8th century.

During the High Middle Ages, the village Hinwil was part of the Landvogtei of Grüningen and was then, after 1280, subordinated to the commandry of the Knights of St. John at Bubikon. In the process of the Reformation, the governance of Hinwil and other villages of the region was divided between Zürich and the Order of the Knights of St. John, with the influence of the latter being limited by an agreement to use only members of the Reformed Church of Zürich as their local governors.

The economy of Hinwil was originally based on agriculture and rural handcraft. During the second half of the 16th century regional production of linen was introduced, from the 17th century on livestock farming and especially the early modern workshop-system of cloth production came to be dominant and, together with tourism in the wake of the railroad connection established in 1876, provided a certain prosperity in the 19th century and the years before World War I. Industrial production used to play a comparably modest role, yet came to be more important with the local establishment of Bührer Traktorenwerke AG (tractor production, since 1939) and Ferag AG (materials handling namely for newspaper production, since 1957).

== Geography ==
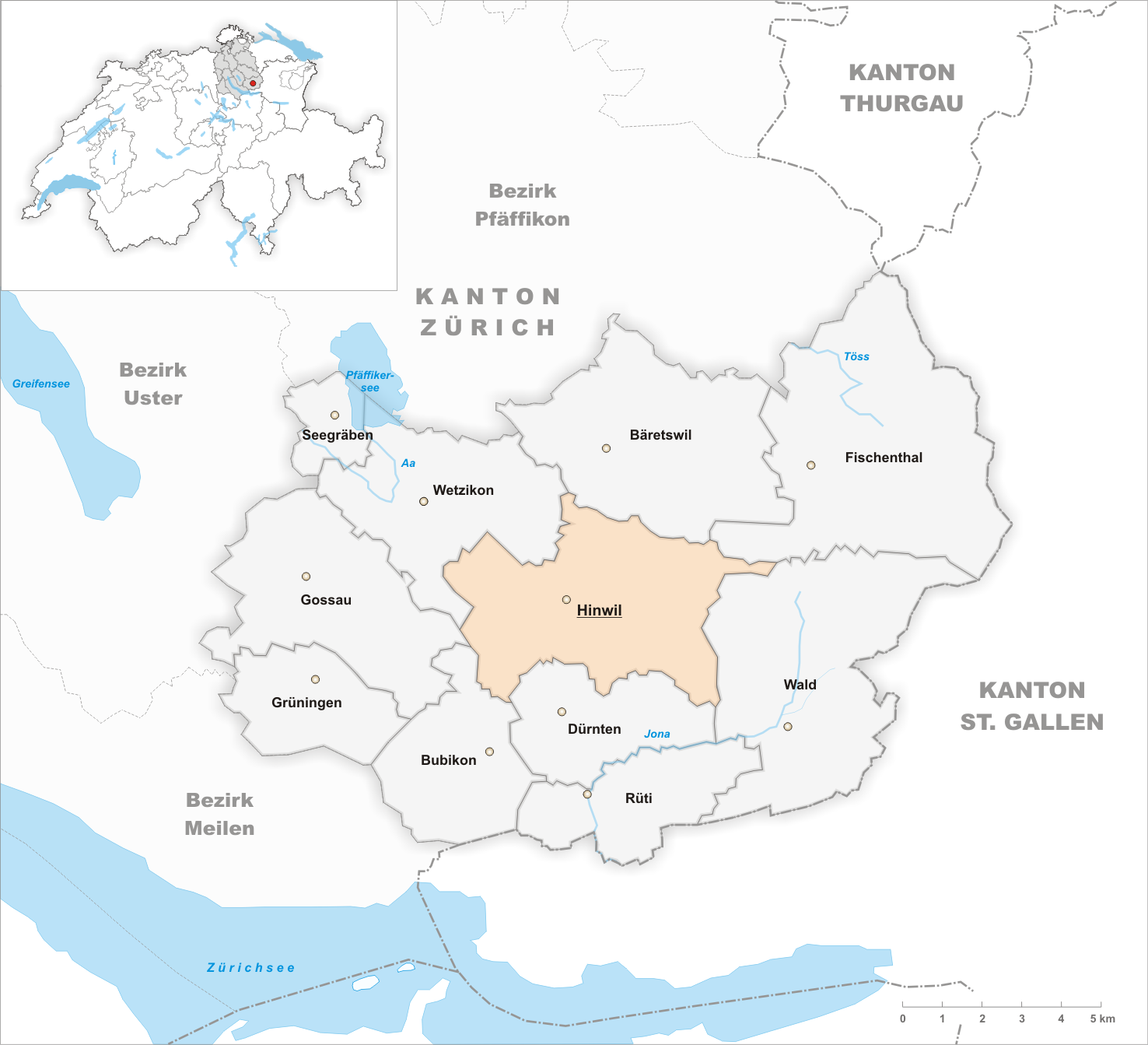
Hinwil

Hinwil has an area of 22.3 km^{2} (8.6 sq mi). Of this area, 53.9% is used for agricultural purposes, while 26.8% is forested. Of the rest of the land, 17.6% is settled (buildings or roads) and the remainder (1.7%) is non-productive (rivers, glaciers or mountains). In 1996 housing and buildings made up 11.5% of the total area, while transportation infrastructure made up the rest (6.1%). Of the total unproductive area, water (streams and lakes) made up 0.4% of the area. As of 2007 14% of the total municipal area was undergoing some type of construction.

The municipality is located in the Zürcher Oberland on the Bachtel mountain. It was formed in 1798 from the parish of the same name. It includes four independent villages; Hinwil, Ringwil, Wernetshausen and Hadlikon. The hamlets of Bossikon, Erlosen and Girenbad as well as about one hundred individual farms make up the rest of the municipality.

== Demographics ==
Hinwil has a population (as of 31 December 2020) of 11,354. As of 2007, 13.7% of the population was made up of foreign nationals. As of 2008 the gender distribution of the population was 49.7% male and 50.3% female. Over the last 10 years the population has grown at a rate of 9.5%. Most of the population (as of 2000) speaks German (91.1%), with Italian being second most common ( 2.4%) and Albanian being third ( 1.1%).

In the 2007 election the most popular party was the SVP which received 44.7% of the vote. The next three most popular parties were the SPS (13%), the CSP (11.1%) and the FDP (10.4%).

The age distribution of the population (as of 2000) is children and teenagers (0–19 years old) make up 24.6% of the population, while adults (20–64 years old) make up 62.2% and seniors (over 64 years old) make up 13.2%. The entire Swiss population is generally well educated. In Hinwil about 78.5% of the population (between age 25-64) have completed either non-mandatory upper secondary education or additional higher education (either university or a Fachhochschule). There are 3815 households in Hinwil.

Hinwil has an unemployment rate of 1.94%. As of 2005, there were 187 people employed in the primary economic sector and about 77 businesses involved in this sector. 2627 people are employed in the secondary sector and there are 144 businesses in this sector. 3006 people are employed in the tertiary sector, with 399 businesses in this sector. As of 2007 39.4% of the working population were employed full-time, and 60.6% were employed part-time.

As of 2008 there were 2610 Catholics and 4657 Protestants in Hinwil. In the 2000 census, religion was broken down into several smaller categories. From the 2000 census, 54.1% were some type of Protestant, with 50.5% belonging to the Swiss Reformed Church and 3.6% belonging to other Protestant churches. 26.5% of the population were Catholic. Of the rest of the population, 0% were Muslim, 4.9% belonged to another religion (not listed), 2.9% did not give a religion, and 10.8% were atheist or agnostic.

The historical population is given in the following table:

year	population
1637	624
1794	2,112
1850	2,697
1900	2,864
1950	3,623
1980	7,554
2000	9,157

== Transportation ==
Hinwil railway station is the terminal station of the Zürich S-Bahn on the line S14. Its train station is a 40-minute ride from Zürich Hauptbahnhof.

== Weather ==
Hinwil has an average of 145.4 days of rain per year and on average receives 1,341 mm (52.8 in) of precipitation. The wettest month is August during which time Hinwil receives an average of 170 mm (6.7 in) of precipitation. During the wettest month, there is precipitation for an average of 14 days.

== Economy ==
Hinwil is the home of the Audi Revolut F1 Team, where Audi Motorsport AG (formerly known as Sauber Motorsport AG) builds the chassis and other components required to compete in the Formula 1 series.

Other companies based in Hinwil are FBB (FBB Frischbeton & Baustoff AG), Ferag, and Belimo Automation AG.

== Notable people ==
- Ueli Maurer (born 1950), Swiss politician, member of the Swiss Federal Council, lives in Hinwil
- Bruno Zuppiger (1952–2016), Swiss management consultant, soldier and politician, lived in Hinwil
- Dany Brand (born 1996 in Hinwil), Swiss athlete specialising in the 400 metres hurdles
- Peter Sauber (born 1943 in Zurich), Swiss motorsport executive, founder and former CEO and Team principal of the Sauber F1 team, lived in Hinwil
