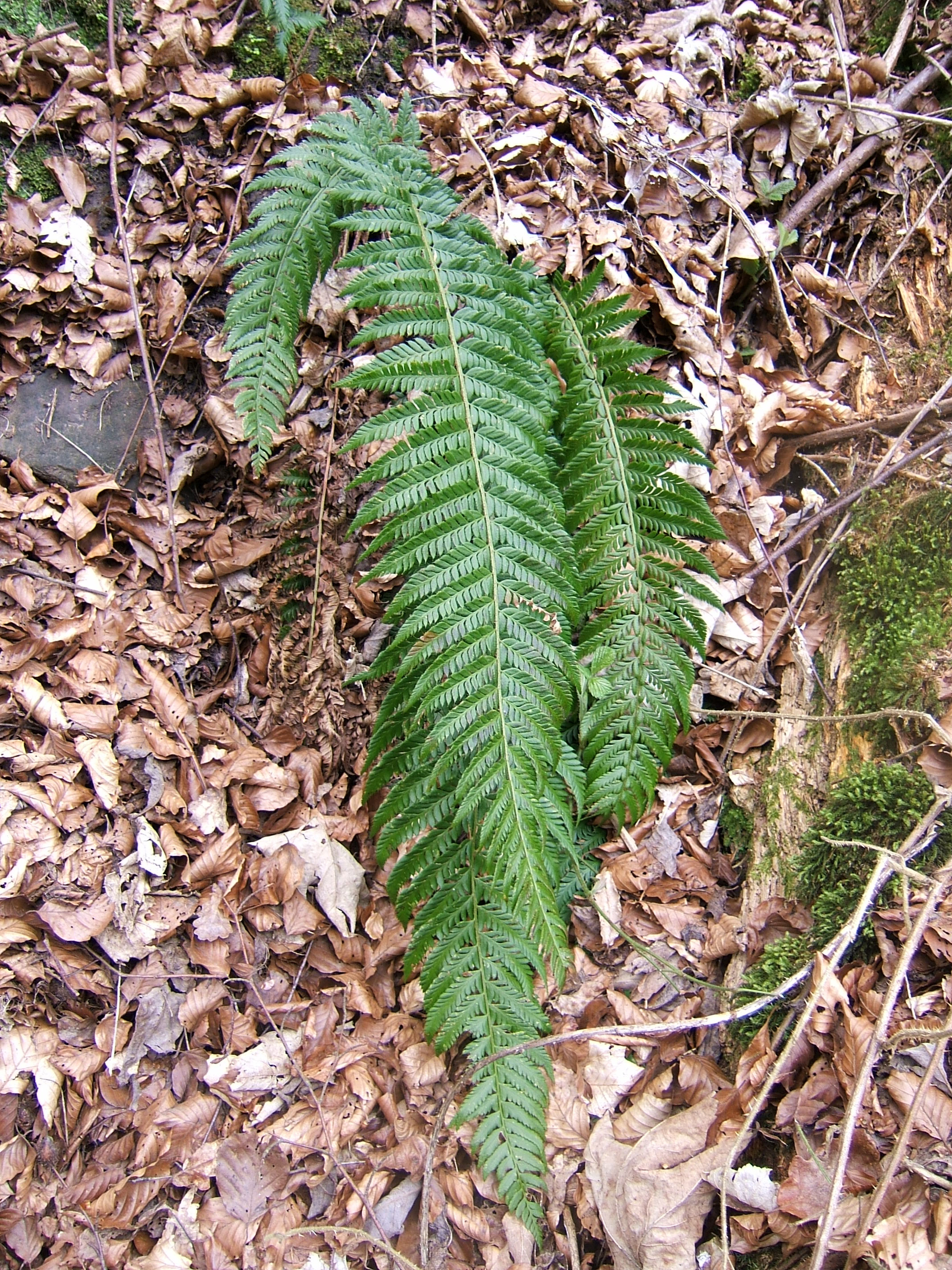

Scientific classification
- Kingdom: Plantae
- Clade: Tracheophytes
- Division: Polypodiophyta
- Class: Polypodiopsida
- Order: Polypodiales
- Suborder: Polypodiineae
- Family: Dryopteridaceae
- Genus: Polystichum
- Species: P. aculeatum

Binomial name
- Polystichum aculeatum (L.) Roth

= Polystichum aculeatum =

Species of fern

Polystichum aculeatum, the hard shield-fern, is an evergreen fern native to Europe. It is most abundant in upland regions of the British Isles and western France, where it benefits from the combination of mild winters and moist summers, but also occurs more locally across most of Europe except northern Scandinavia, northern Russia; in the Mediterranean region it is confined to high altitudes. It grows on steep slopes in woodlands. it is sometimes considered an indicator of the presence of ancient woodlands.

== Description ==
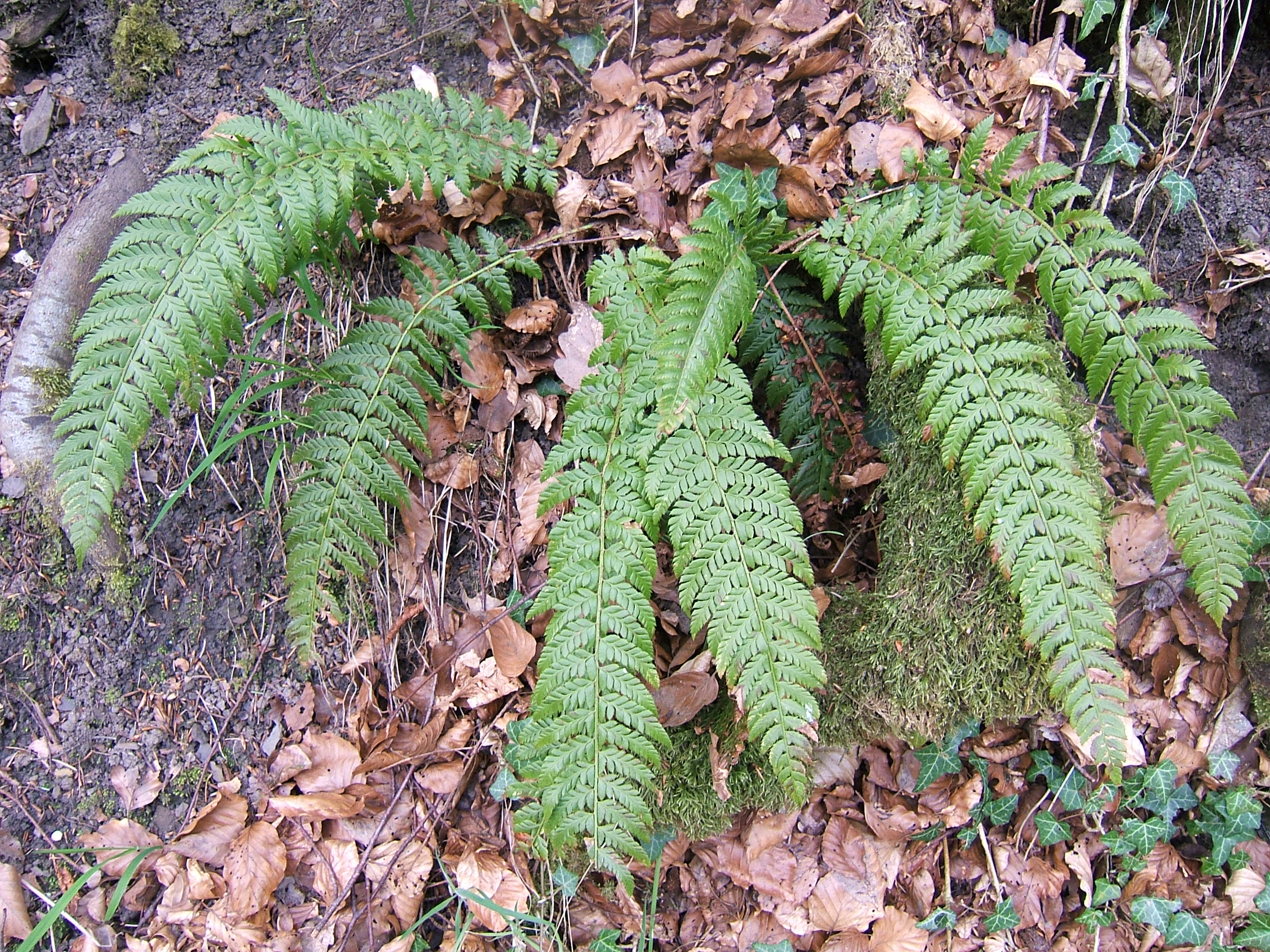

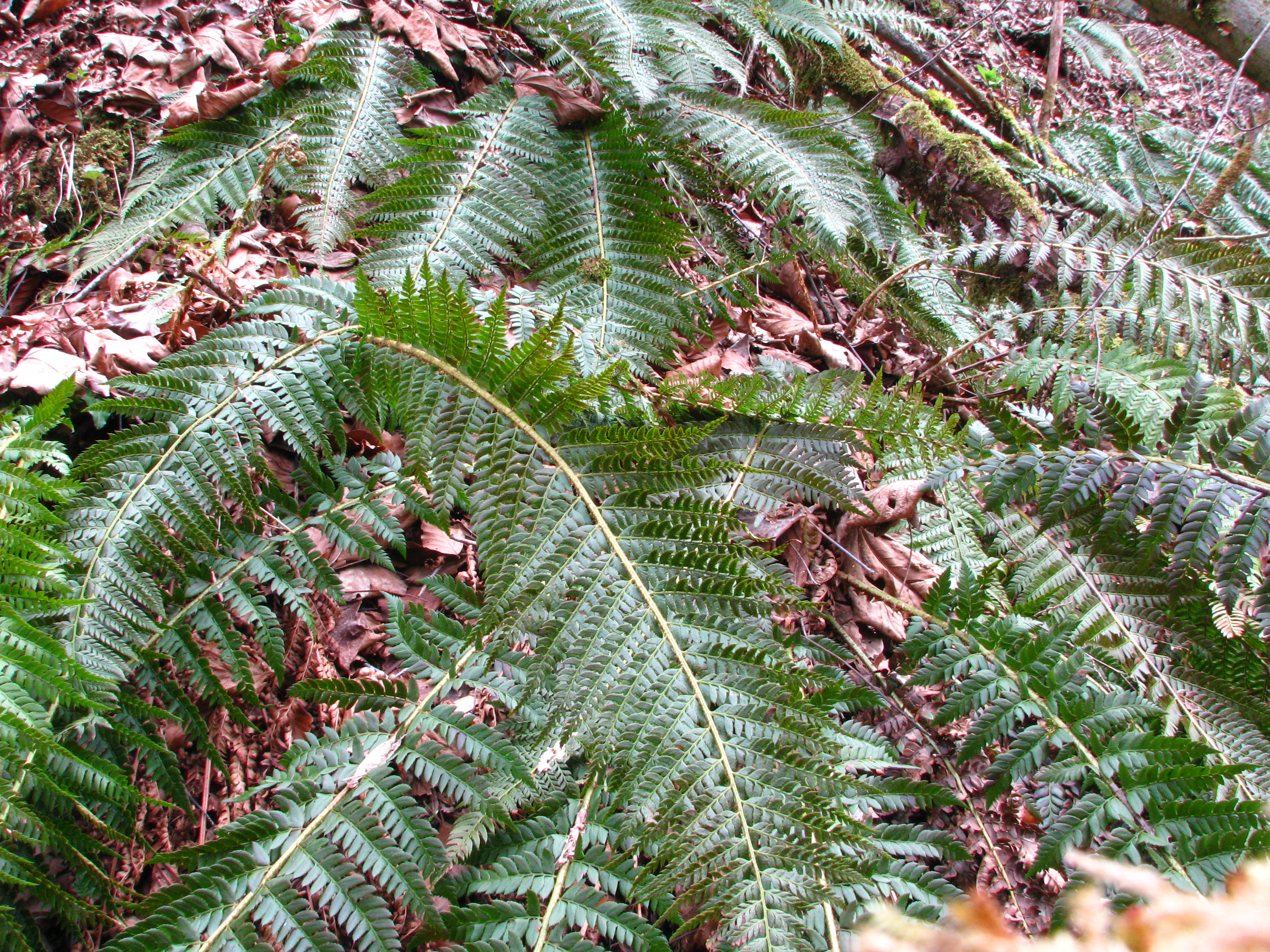
Tannertobel in Tann, Switzerland

The glossy dark green fronds are 30–90 cm long, usually drooping downslope, with typically 3–8 fronds on a mature plant. The fronds are stiff and hard-textured, bipinnate (single-pinnate on small, young plants), with the pinnae opposite on the stalk. Each pinna is 3–11 cm long, with a large upward-pointing pinnule at the base, and the other pinnules decreasing in size toward the pinna tip; the pinnules have bristly tips. Individual fronds live for 1.5–2.5 years and remain attached to the rhizome after withering. The round sori occupy two rows on either side of the midrib of each pinnule and are covered by a centrally-attached, umbrella-like indusium with fringed edges. They produce light yellow spores.

== Etymology ==
The Latin specific epithet aculeatum means "bristly".

== Uses ==
Polystichum aculeatum is grown as an ornamental plant in gardens, and has gained the Royal Horticultural Society's Award of Garden Merit.

== Distribution ==
It is found in the counties of Down, Antrim and Londonderry in Ireland, throughout the British Isles and Europe except for the northern countries. It is found in mountain limestone screes in the Jura and the alps, and on alpine and subalpine limestone cliffs.
