= Eschenbach, St. Gallen =

Eschenbach
- Municipality
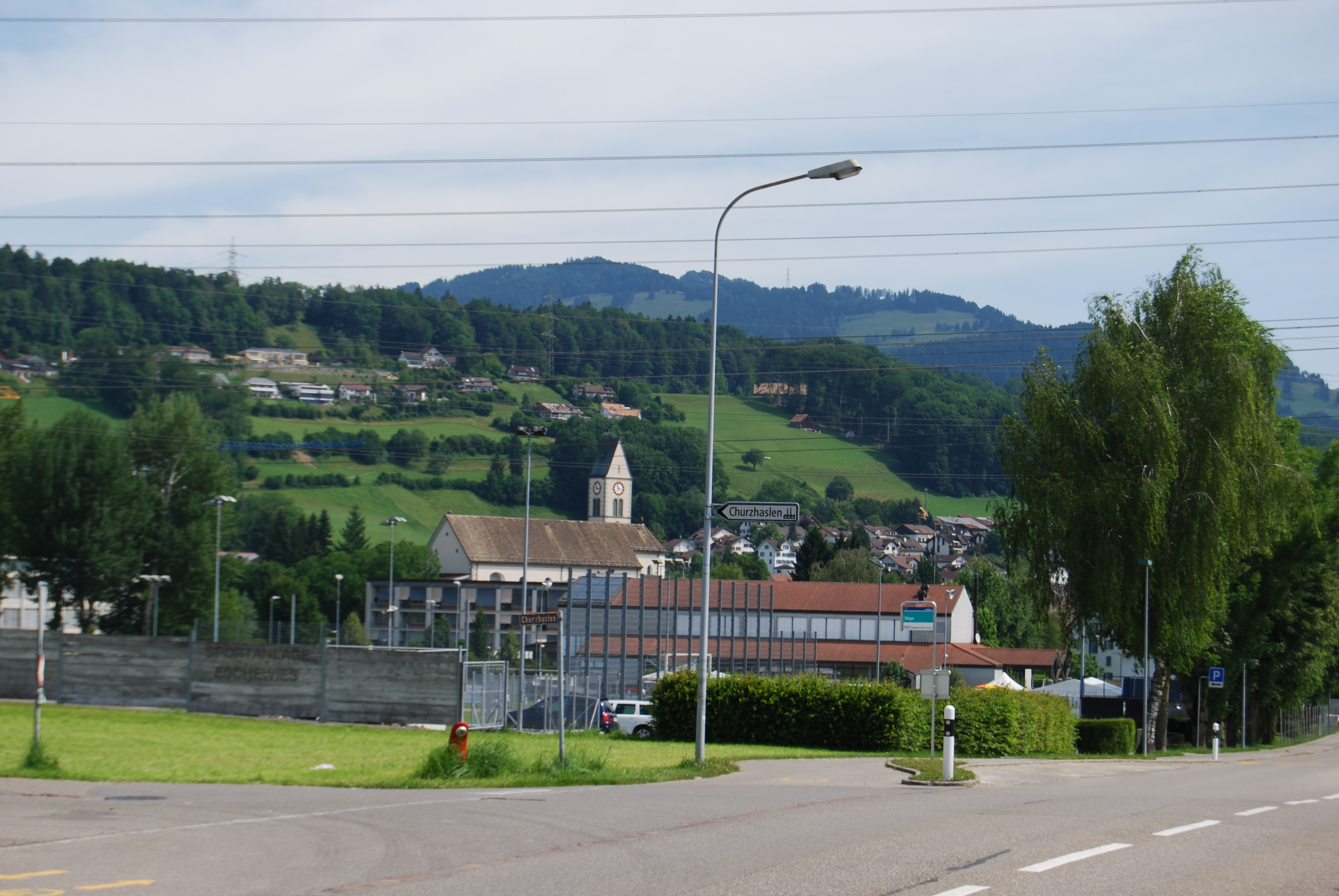

- Flag Coat of arms
- Location of Eschenbach
- Location within Switzerland Location within Canton of St. Gallen
- Coordinates: 47°14′N 8°55′E
- Country: Switzerland
- Canton: St. Gallen
- District: See-Gaster

Government
  - Mayor: Josef Blöchlinger

Area
  - Total: 54.86 km^{2} (21.18 sq mi)
- Elevation: 485 m (1,591 ft)

Population (Dec 2011)
  - Total: 8,606
  - Density: 156.9/km^{2} (406.3/sq mi)
- Time zone: UTC+01:00 (CET)
  - Summer (DST): UTC+02:00 (CEST)
- Postal code: 8733 / 8735 / 8638
- SFOS number: 3342
- ISO 3166 code: CH-SG
- Surrounded by: Jona, Rüti (ZH), Schmerikon, Uznach, Wald (ZH)
- Website: eschenbach.ch

Eschenbach is a municipality in the Wahlkreis (constituency) of See-Gaster in the canton of St. Gallen in Switzerland. On 1 January 2013 the former municipalities of Goldingen and St. Gallenkappel merged into the municipality of Eschenbach.

== History ==
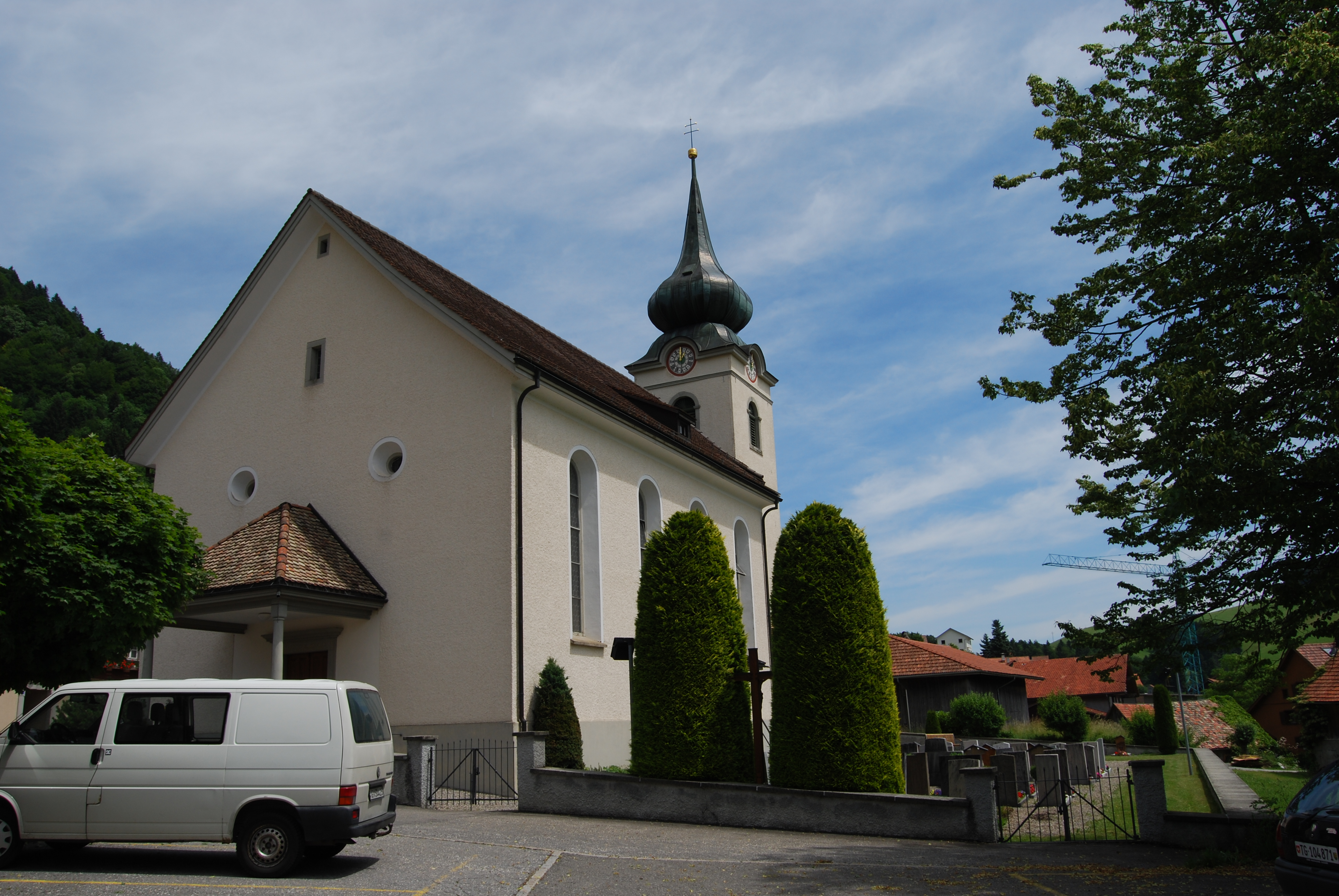
Church of St. Antonius von Padua in St. Gallenkappel

=== Eschenbach ===
Eschenbach is first mentioned in 775 as Esghibach. In 829 it was mentioned as Esgithorf.

=== Goldingen ===
The name Goldingen was applied to two different hamlets in the municipality. The current hamlet of Goldingen is first mentioned in 1800 and before that time was known as Thal. The hamlet of Vordersagen was first mentioned in 1266 as Goldelingin and until about 1700 was known as Goldingen. Additionally the hamlet of Hintersagen was known until about 1800 as Hintergoldingen.

=== St. Gallenkappel ===
St. Gallenkappel is first mentioned in 1275 as S. Galli capella. In 1425 it was mentioned as bi Sant Gallencappel, and in the local Swiss German is still known as Chappele. It is located along two old trade and pilgrimage routes, one from Toggenburg over the Laad and the second from Hummelwald to Lake Zurich. In the 9th century there may have been a chapel dedicated to St. Gallus, where the current parish church now stands. This chapel was the origin of the village name.

On 10 December 1830, St. Gallenkappel was the site of a popular assembly, protesting the loss of freedoms under the Act of Mediation and the Restoration. The assembly at St. Gallenkappel was one of several in the Canton of St. Gallen and throughout Switzerland. They called for two main changes in the cantonal constitution. First, they called for peacefully adjusting the constitutions by adjusting the way seats in local legislatures and the Tagsatzung were allocated. In particular they objected to what they saw as the over-representation of the cantonal capital in the government. Secondly, they sought a way to amend the constitution. Very few cantons even had a way to amend or modify the constitutions, and none of them allowed citizen's initiatives to be added.

While all of these assemblies ended peacefully, they did march through the streets of St. Gallen. Following the protest march, the government quickly agreed to the protesters demands. Throughout the country, these successful assemblies led to the period known as the Regeneration and in 1848 the creation of the Swiss Federal State.

== Geography ==
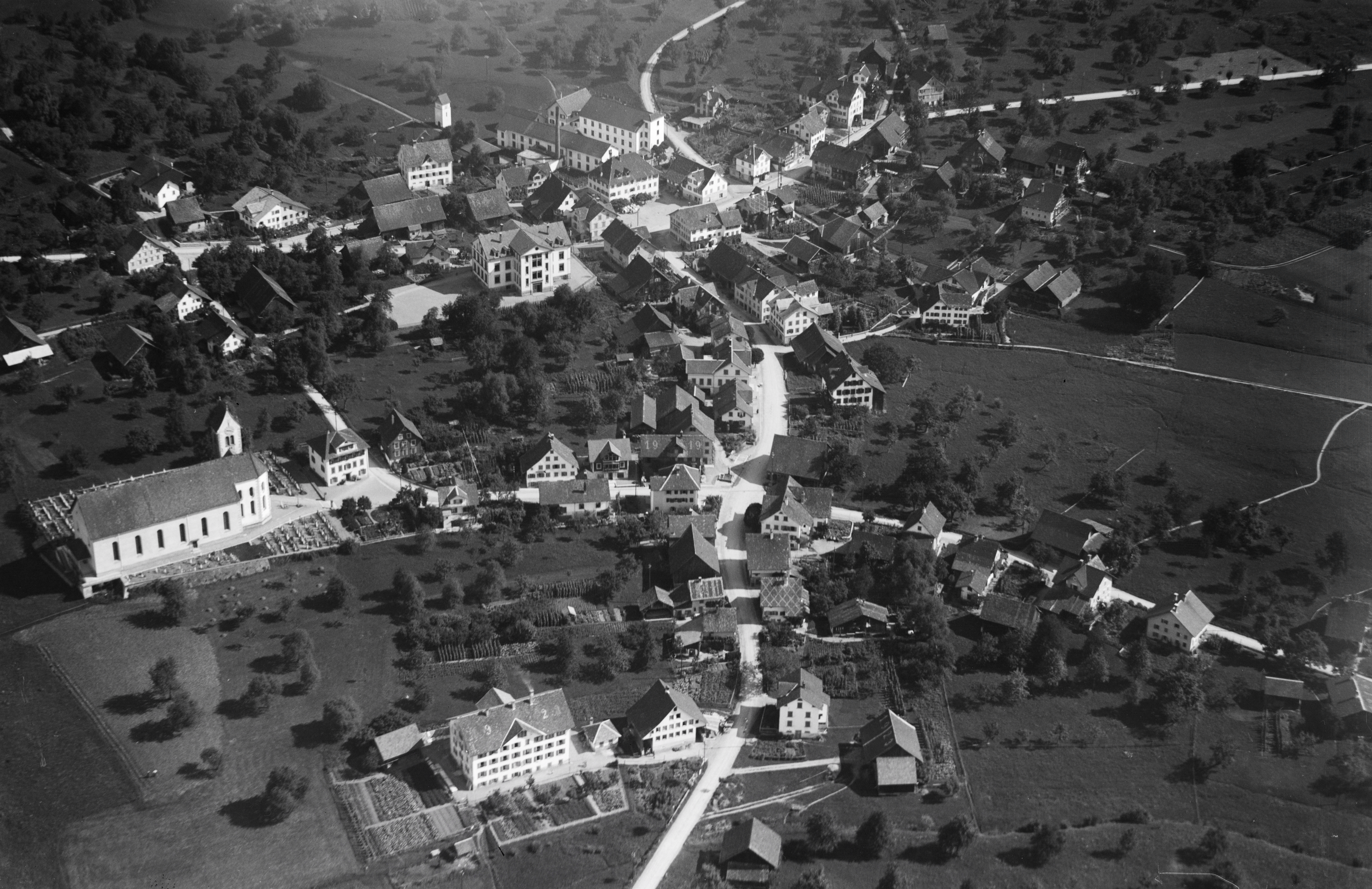
Aerial view from 400 m by Walter Mittelholzer (1923)

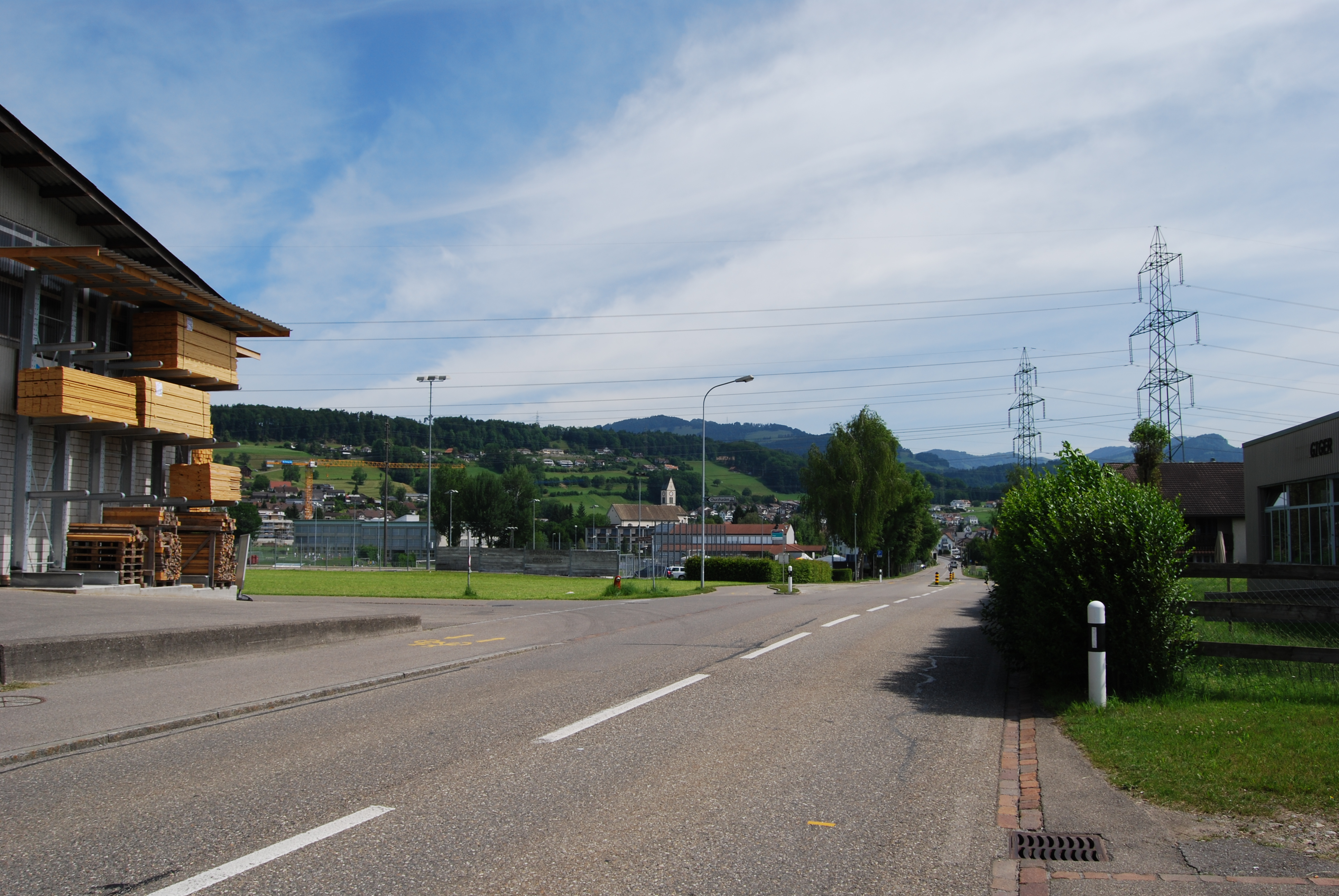
Eschenbach and surrounding hills

The larger municipality of Eschenbach now has a total combined area of 54.89 km^{2} (21.19 sq mi).

Eschenbach had an area, as of 2006, of 13.3 km^{2} (5.1 sq mi). Of this area, 61.9% is used for agricultural purposes, while 21.9% is forested. Of the rest of the land, 15% is settled (buildings or roads) and the remainder (1.1%) is non-productive (rivers or lakes).

The municipality is located in the See-Gaster Wahlkreis. It consists of the village of Eschenbach and the hamlets of Bürg, Diemberg, Ermenswil, Länziken, Lütschbach and Neuhaus.

Goldingen had an area, as of 2006, of 22.1 km^{2} (8.5 sq mi). Of this area, 50.7% is used for agricultural purposes, while 45.1% is forested. Of the rest of the land, 3.7% is settled (buildings or roads) and the remainder (0.5%) is non-productive (rivers or lakes). The former municipality is located in the See-Gaster hill country. It consists of the hamlets of Goldingen, Echeltschwil, Hubertingen, Wolfertingen, Eglingen, Vordersagen, Hintersagen, Gibel and Oberholz.

St. Gallenkappel had an area, as of 2006, of 19.5 km^{2} (7.5 sq mi). Of this area, 59.5% is used for agricultural purposes, while 34.9% is forested. Of the rest of the land, 5.4% is settled (buildings or roads) and the remainder (0.2%) is non-productive (rivers or lakes). The former municipality is located to the southwest of the Ricken Pass between the Linth valley and the Tweralspitz (elevation 1,332 m (4,370 ft)). It consists of the village of St. Gallenkappel and the hamlets of Bezikon, Rüeterswil and Walde.

== Coat of arms ==
The blazon of the municipal coat of arms is Or a Rose Gules barbed and seeded proper.

== Demographics ==
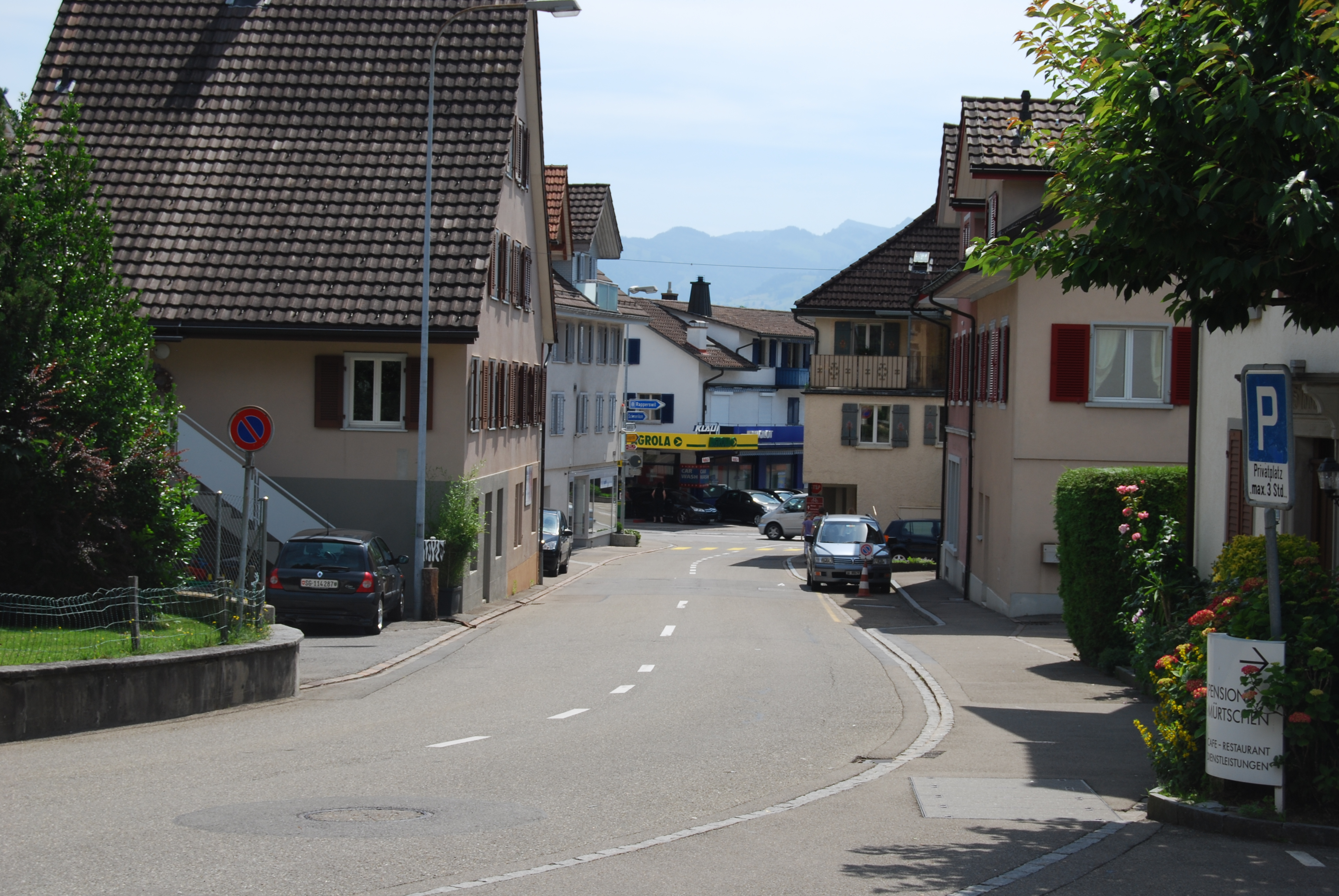
Eschenbach village

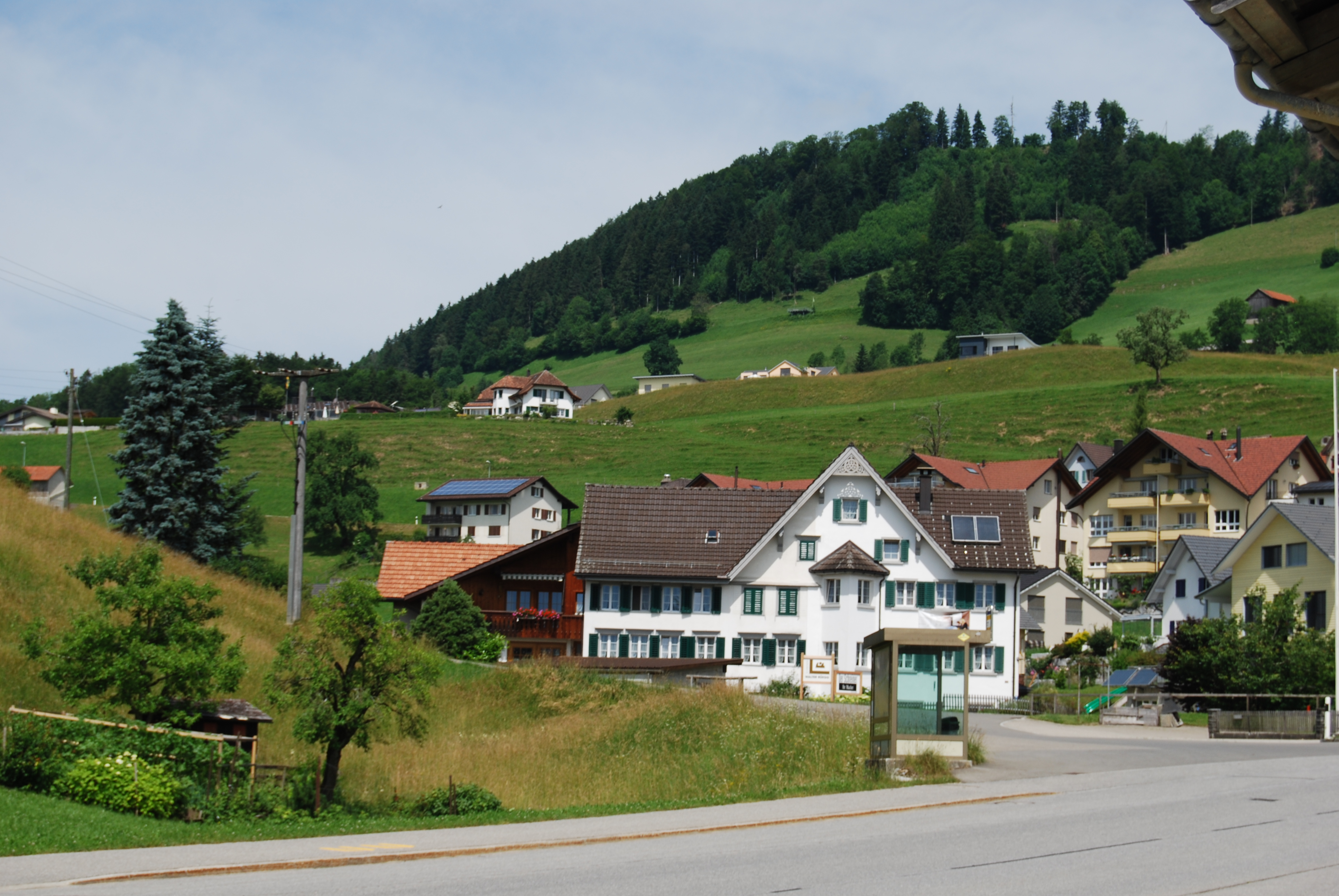
Houses in Goldingen

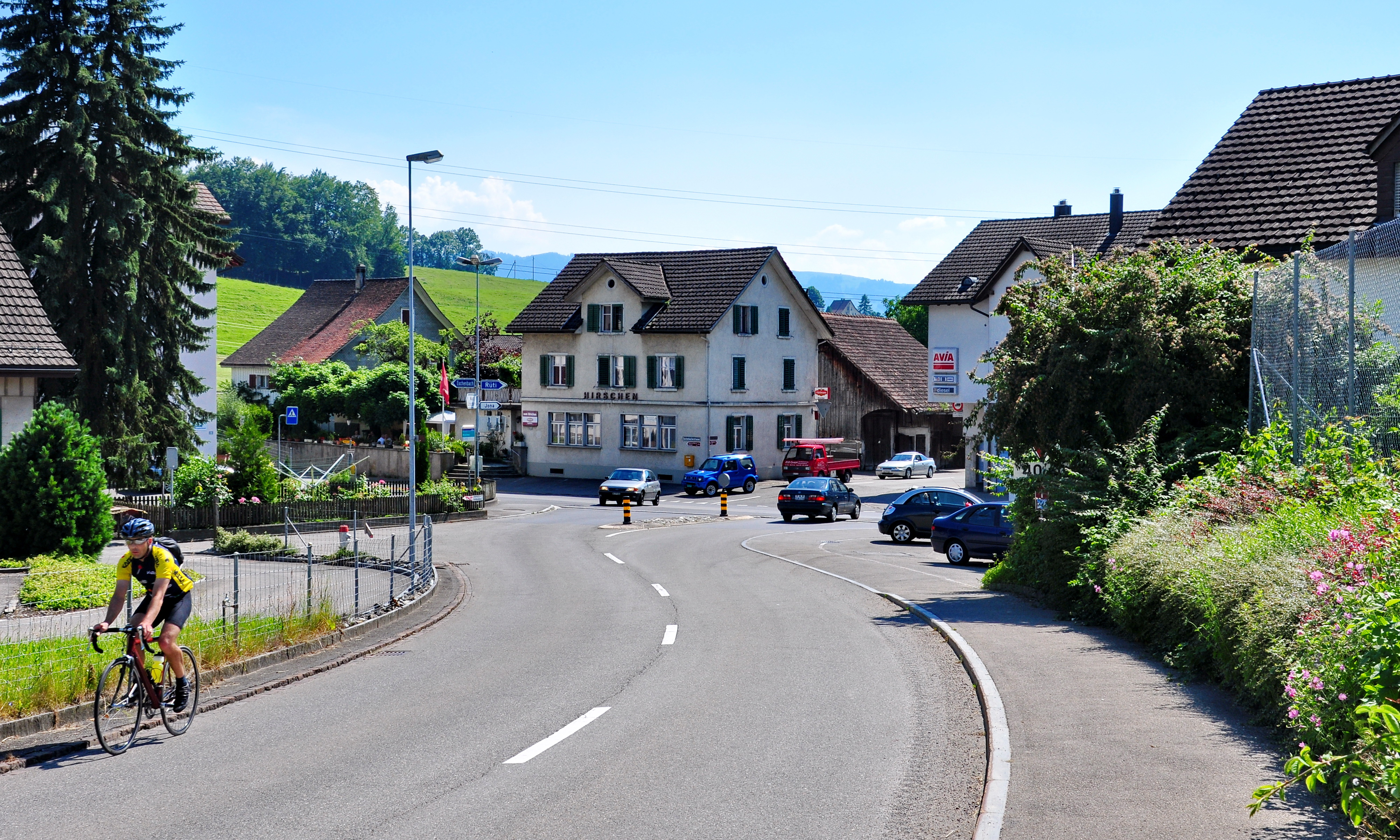

Eschenbach has a population (as of 31 December 2020) of 9,614. As of 2007, about 16.8% of the population was made up of foreign nationals. Of the foreign population, (as of 2000), 75 are from Germany, 186 are from Italy, 417 are from ex-Yugoslavia, 17 are from Austria, 110 are from Turkey, and 104 are from another country. Over the last 10 years the population has grown at a rate of 10.4%. Most of the population (as of 2000) speaks German (88.8%), with Albanian being second most common (2.7%) and Italian being third (2.3%). Of the Swiss national languages (as of 2000), 4,515 speak German, 21 people speak French, 118 people speak Italian, and 8 people speak Romansh.

The age distribution, as of 2000, in Eschenbach is; 739 children or 14.5% of the population are between 0 and 9 years old and 764 teenagers or 15.0% are between 10 and 19. Of the adult population, 614 people or 12.1% of the population are between 20 and 29 years old. 844 people or 16.6% are between 30 and 39, 763 people or 15.0% are between 40 and 49, and 555 people or 10.9% are between 50 and 59. The senior population distribution is 419 people or 8.2% of the population are between 60 and 69 years old, 246 people or 4.8% are between 70 and 79, there are 119 people or 2.3% who are between 80 and 89, and there are 20 people or 0.4% who are between 90 and 99.

In 2000 there were 449 persons (or 8.8% of the population) who were living alone in a private dwelling. There were 943 (or 18.6%) persons who were part of a couple (married or otherwise committed) without children, and 3,277 (or 64.5%) who were part of a couple with children. There were 207 (or 4.1%) people who lived in single parent home, while there are 39 persons who were adult children living with one or both parents, 36 persons who lived in a household made up of relatives, 31 who lived household made up of unrelated persons, and 101 who are either institutionalized or live in another type of collective housing.

In the 2007 federal election the most popular party was the SVP which received 42.9% of the vote. The next three most popular parties were the CVP (26%), the FDP (9.5%) and the SP (9%).

In Eschenbach about 67.5% of the population (between age 25 and 64) have completed either non-mandatory upper secondary education or additional higher education (either university or a Fachhochschule). Out of the total population in Eschenbach, as of 2000, the highest education level completed by 1,131 people (22.3% of the population) was Primary, while 1,750 (34.4%) have completed Secondary, 451 (8.9%) have attended a Tertiary school, and 231 (4.5%) are not in school. The remainder did not answer this question.

== Historic Population ==
The historical population is given in the following chart:

== Heritage sites of national significance ==
The Kusterhaus (also the Landrichter (regional judge)) at Dorfstrasse 13 in Eschenbach and the Fründsberg, a no longer visible castle ruin, in Goldingen are listed as Swiss heritage sites of national significance.

== Economy ==
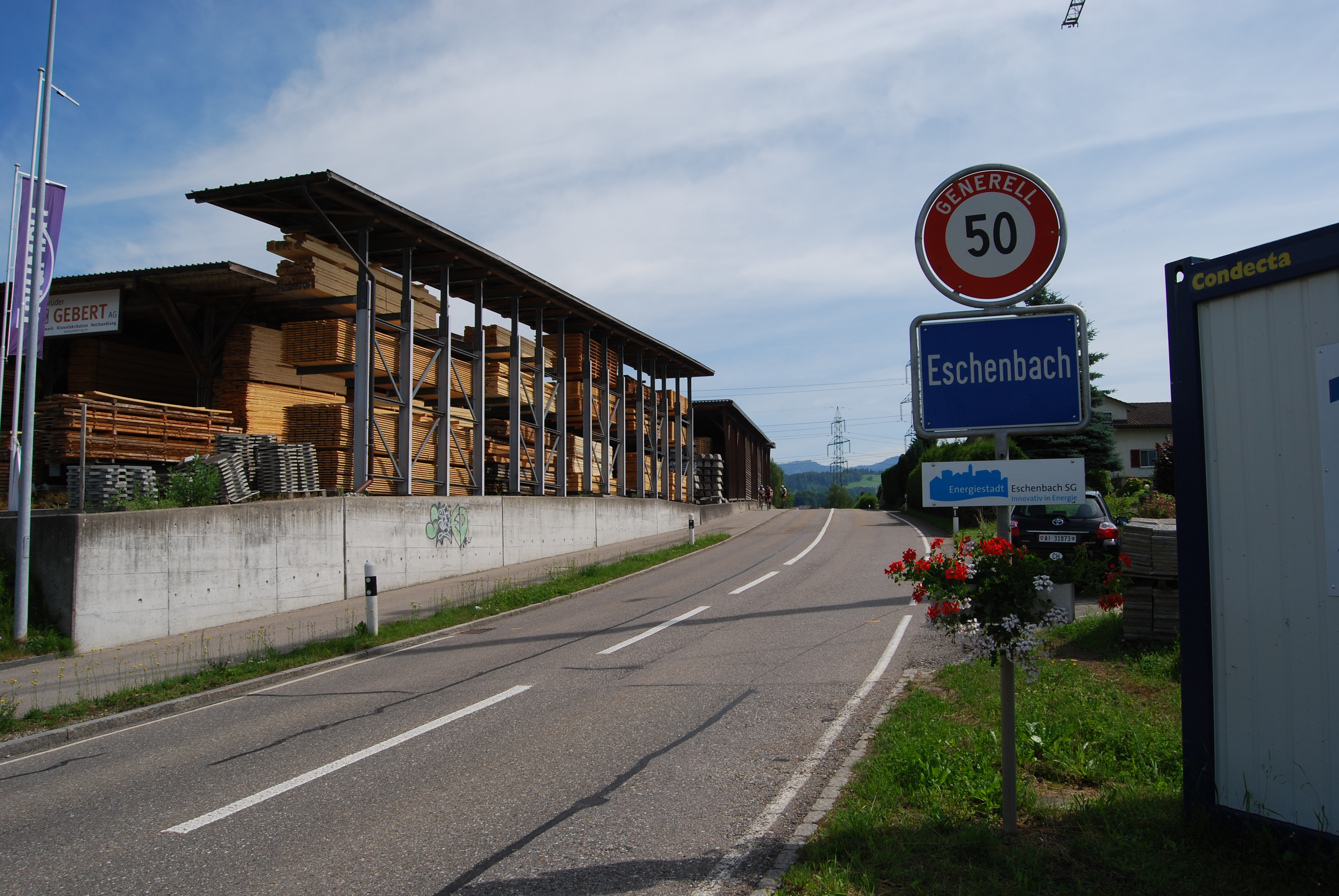
Lumber yard in Eschenbach

As of 2007, Eschenbach had an unemployment rate of 1.3%. As of 2005, there were 186 people employed in the primary economic sector and about 63 businesses involved in this sector. 1,640 people are employed in the secondary sector and there are 75 businesses in this sector. 703 people are employed in the tertiary sector, with 127 businesses in this sector. As of October 2009 the average unemployment rate was 2.5%. There were 285 businesses in the municipality of which 86 were involved in the secondary sector of the economy while 140 were involved in the third. As of 2000 there were 1,011 residents who worked in the municipality, while 1,632 residents worked outside Eschenbach and 947 people commuted into the municipality for work.

== Religion ==
From the 2000 census, 3,324 or 65.4% are Roman Catholic, while 840 or 16.5% belonged to the Swiss Reformed Church. Of the rest of the population, there are 6 individuals (or about 0.12% of the population) who belong to the Christian Catholic faith, there are 93 individuals (or about 1.83% of the population) who belong to the Orthodox Church, and there are 86 individuals (or about 1.69% of the population) who belong to another Christian church. There is 1 individual who is Jewish, and 335 (or about 6.59% of the population) who are Islamic. There are 7 individuals (or about 0.14% of the population) who belong to another church (not listed on the census), 226 (or about 4.45% of the population) belong to no church, are agnostic or atheist, and 165 individuals (or about 3.25% of the population) did not answer the question.
