= Rüti, Zürich =

Rüti
- Municipality
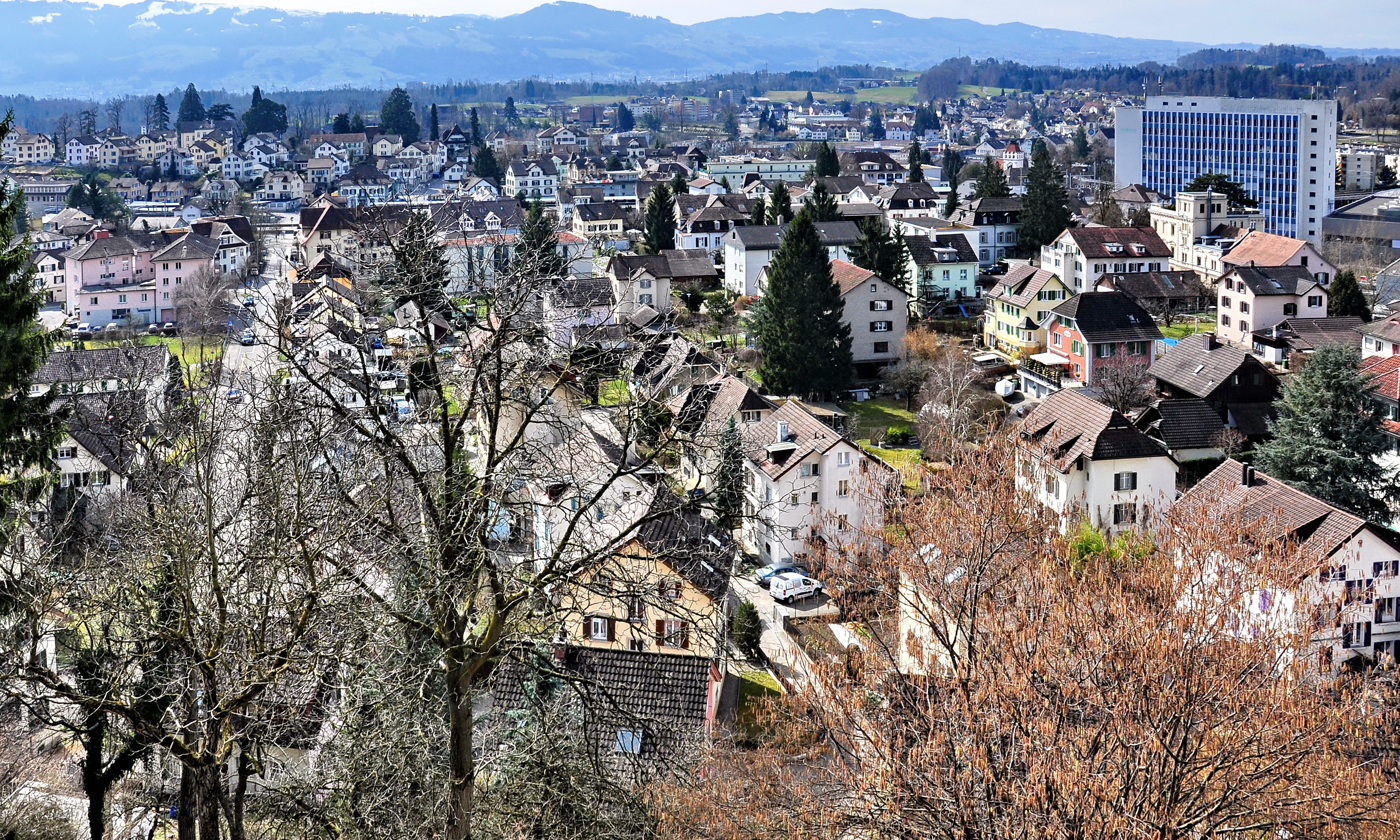

- Flag Coat of arms
- Location of Rüti
- Location within Switzerland Location within Canton of Zürich
- Coordinates: 47°16′N 8°51′E
- Country: Switzerland
- Canton: Zürich
- District: Hinwil

Government
  - Executive: Gemeinderat with 9 members
  - Mayor: Gemeindepräsident; Peter Luginbühl FDP/PRD
  - Parliament: None (Gemeindeversammlung)

Area
  - Total: 10.06 km^{2} (3.88 sq mi)
- Elevation (Bahnhof): 482 m (1,581 ft)

Population (December 2020)
  - Total: 12,494
  - Density: 1,242/km^{2} (3,217/sq mi)
- Time zone: UTC+01:00 (CET)
  - Summer (DST): UTC+02:00 (CEST)
- Postal code: 8630
- SFOS number: 118
- ISO 3166 code: CH-ZH
- Localities: Weid, Moos, Weier and Fägswil
- Surrounded by: Bubikon, Dürnten-Tann, Eschenbach (SG), Rapperswil-Jona (SG), Wald
- Website: www.rueti.ch

Rüti (sometimes written as Rüti ZH in order to distinguish it from other "Rütis") is a Swiss town and a municipality in the district of Hinwil in the canton of Zürich. The river Jona flows through the town.

== History ==
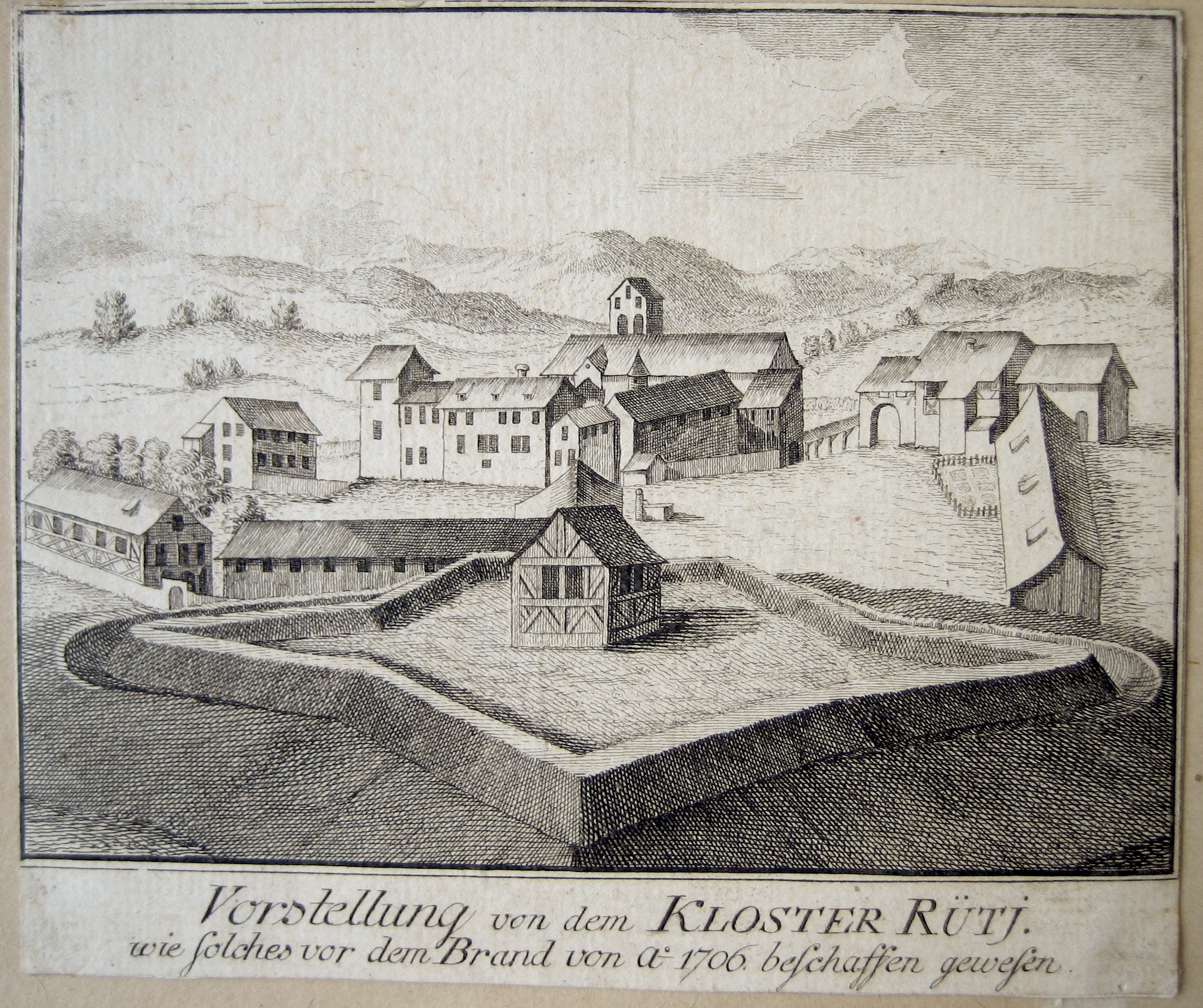
The former Rüti Monastery in the late 17th century

Aerial view from 300 m by Walter Mittelholzer (1919)

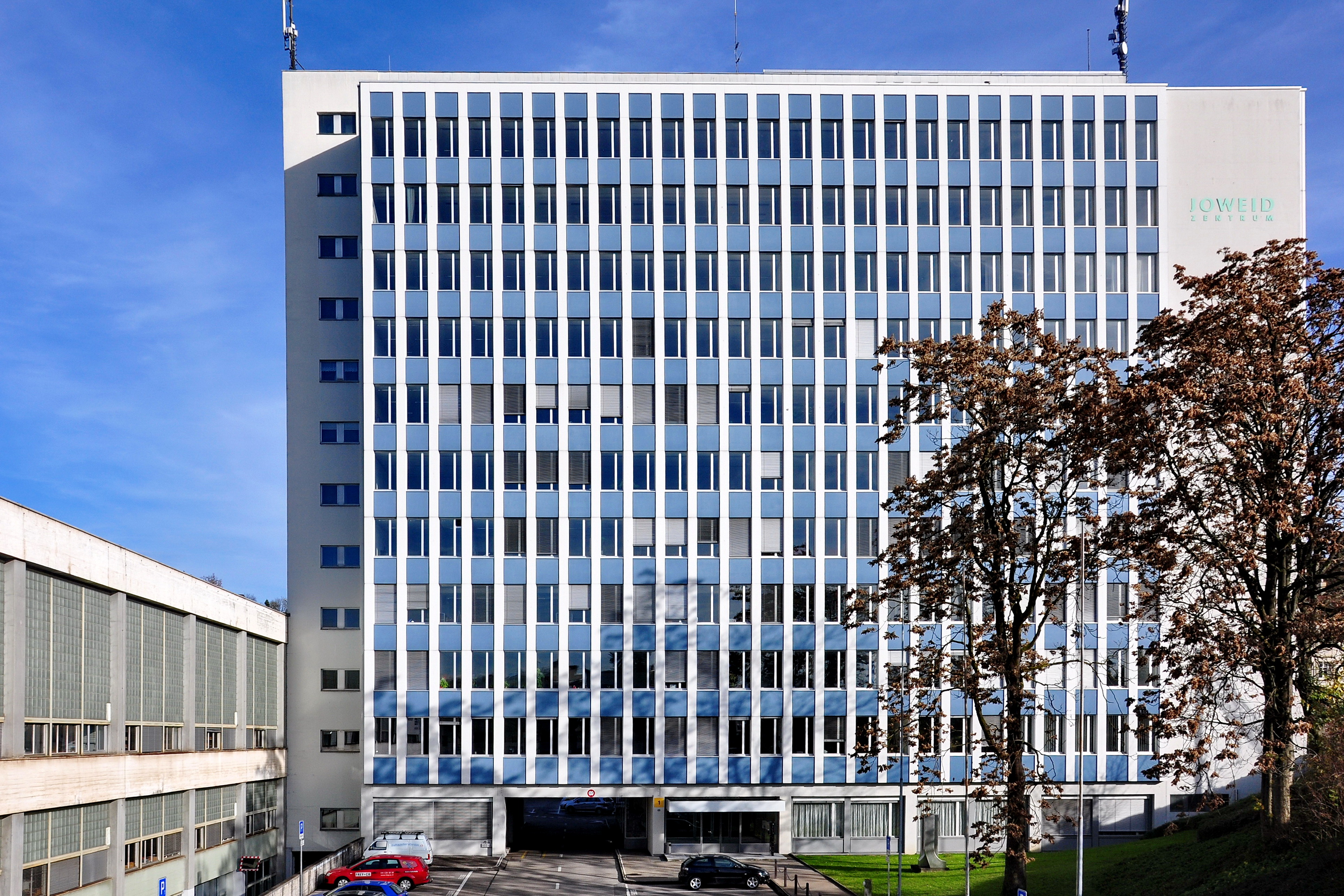
Joweid Center, former Sulzer administration building

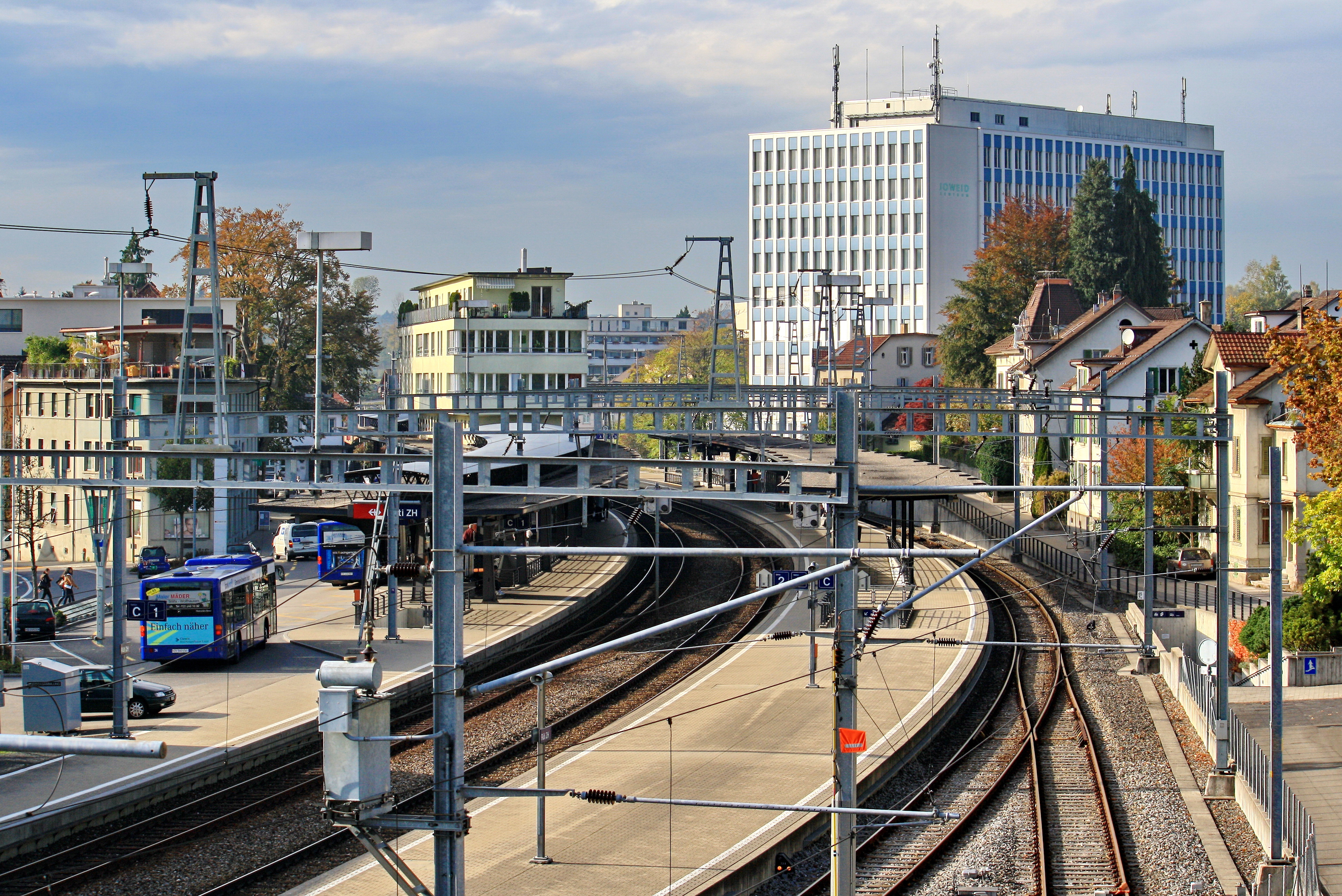
Rüti train station

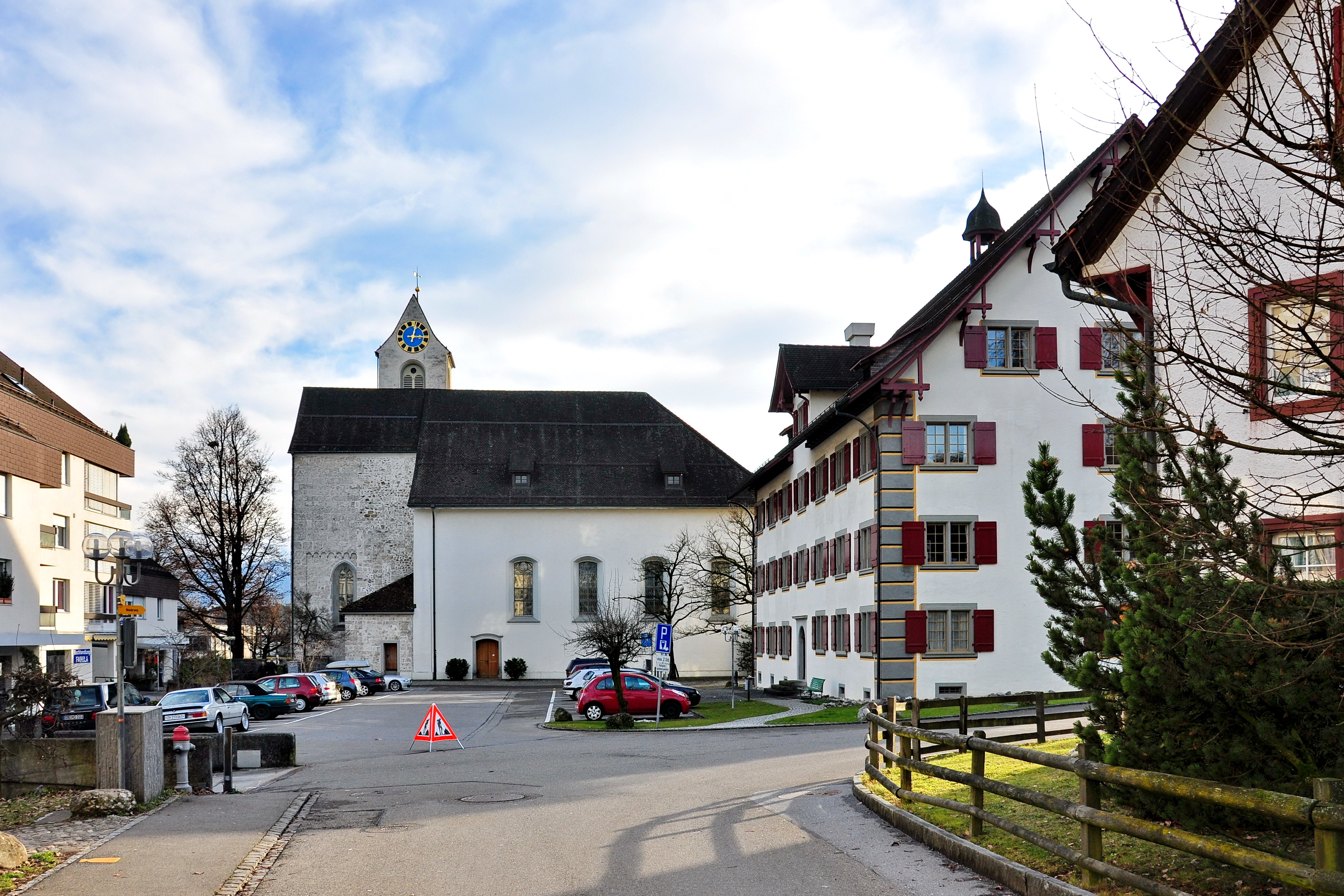
Klosterhof square, the Reformed church and remaining buildings of the former Rüti Monastery, used as public library respectively as apartments (Spitzer buildings in the foreground)

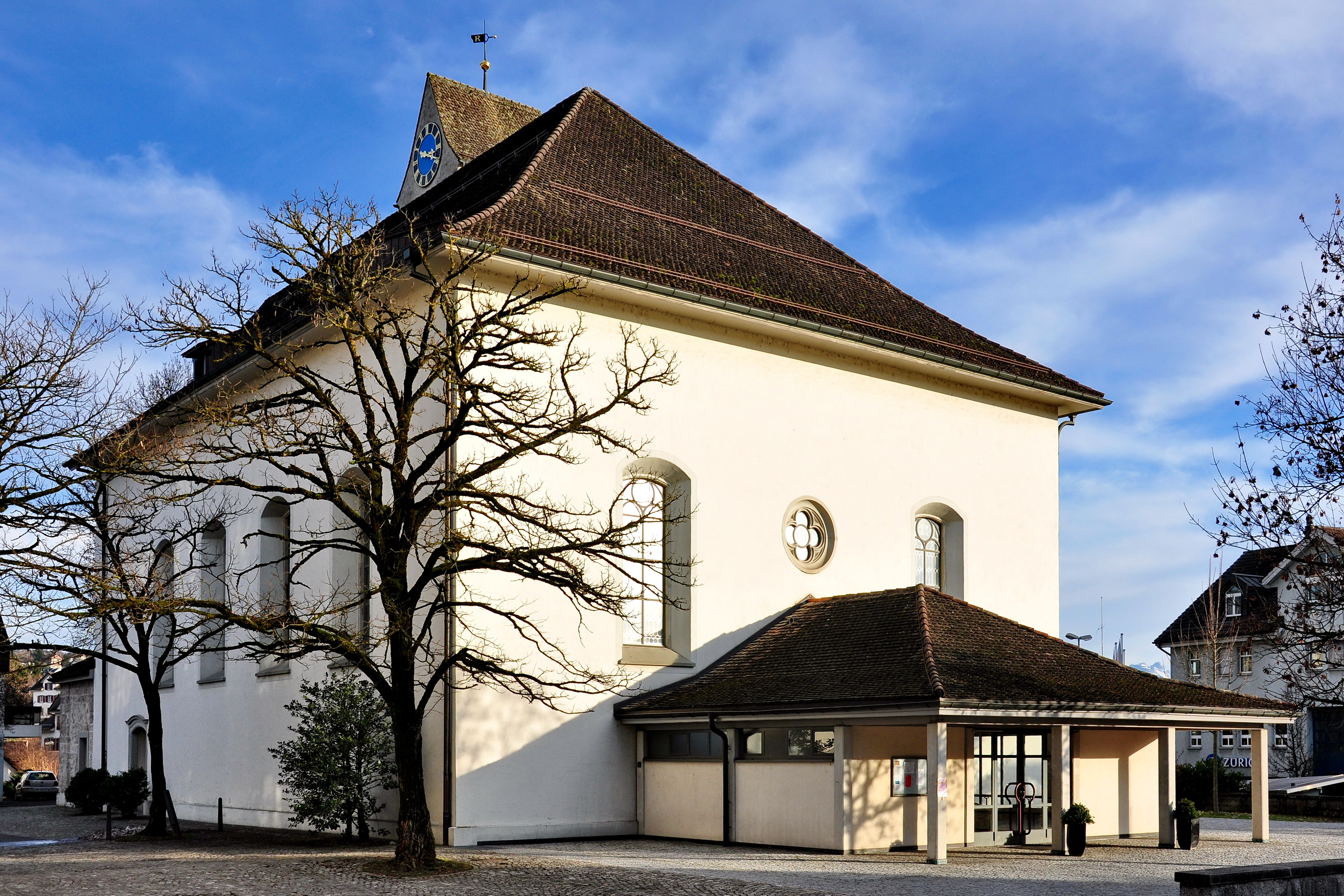
Reformed church as seen from the public library (former Amthaus)

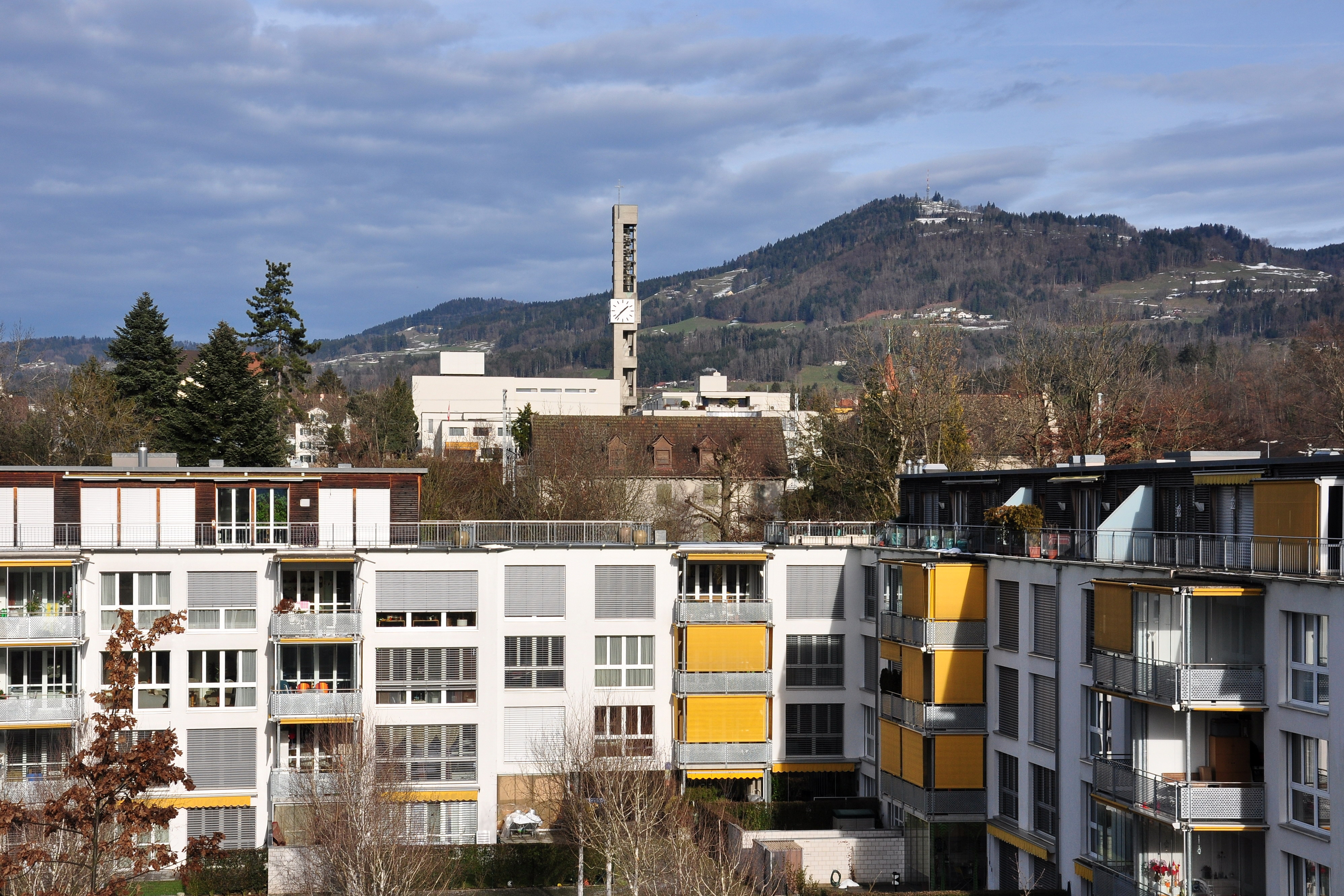
Catholic church in Tann and Bachtel hill

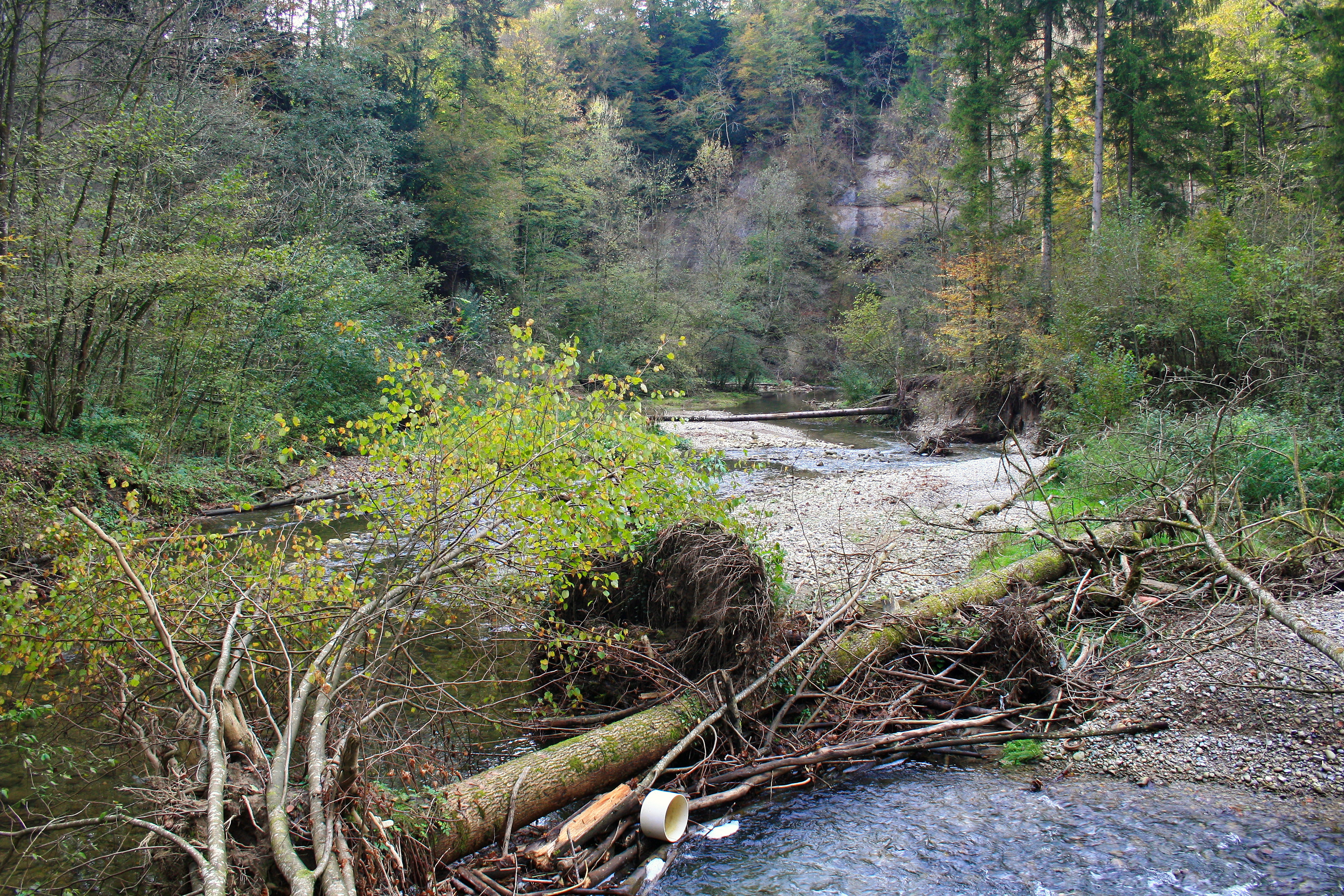
Tannertobel, part of the valley of the river Jona

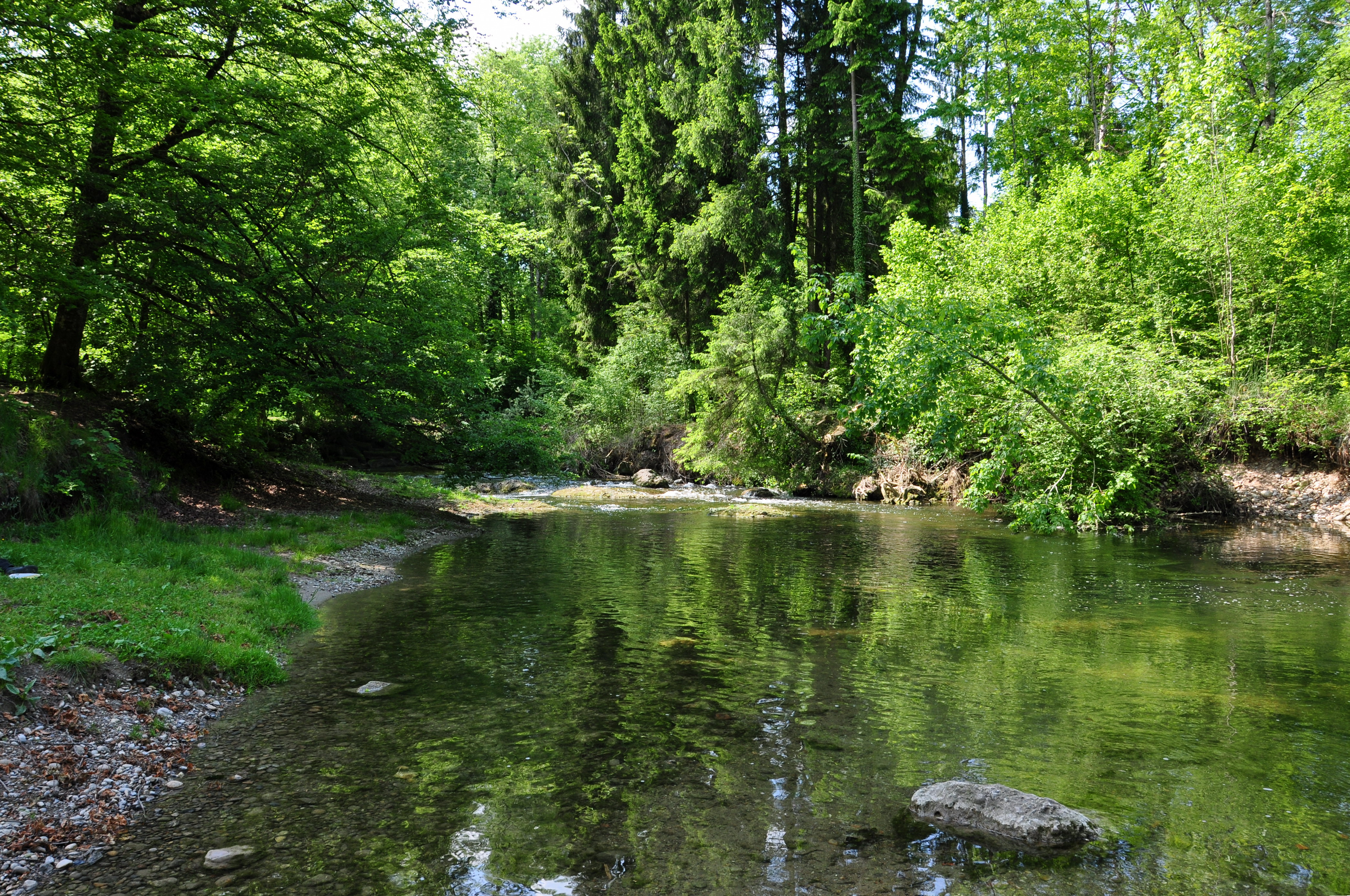
The Jona between Rüti and Jona-Rapperswil

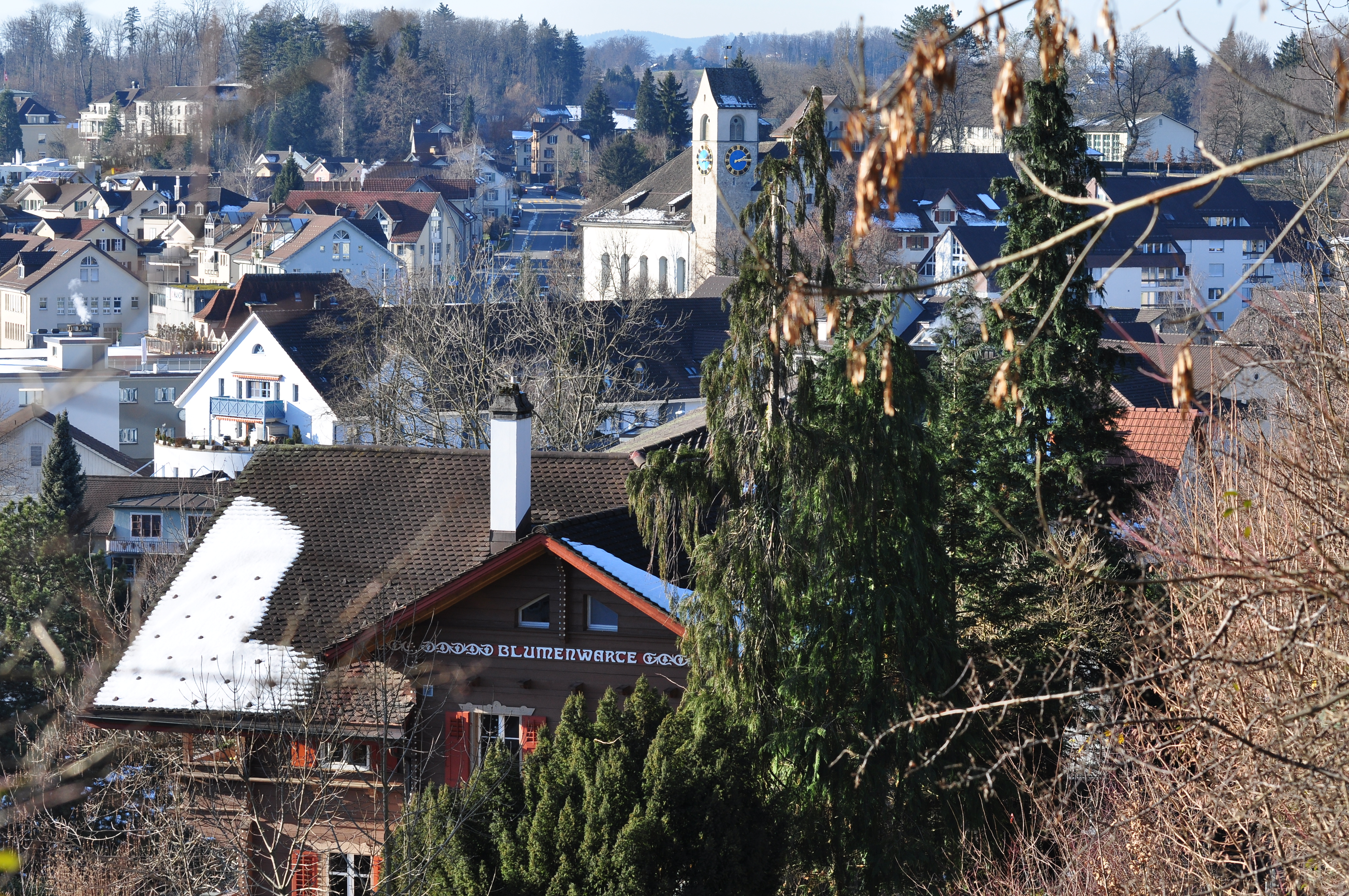

The area around Rüti was probably first settled in the 8th and 9th centuries. In 807, Rüti's quarter Fägswil was first mentioned in a document of the Abbey of Saint Gall. In a document of the German Emperor Otto II (972), the municipality was described as Riutun, the Old High German word for Roden (= to convert forest into farmland), and later forwarded to the name of Rüti. In 1206 the Rüti Monastery was given by Lütold IV, Duke of Regensberg, and the present building that is now the Reformed church was completed in 1283. In 1408 Rüti and the Premonstratensian monastery came as part of the so-called Herrschaft Grüningen under the reign of the government of the city of Zürich. In 1525 (Reformation in Zürich) the monastery was secularized and managed as Amt Rüti by an Amtmann (member of the city of Zürich government) until 1798.

In the mid 16th century, Rüti got one of the first public schools in the canton of Zürich, established by the Zürich reformers and the former monks of the Rüti Monastery. In 1866, the first Catholic Mass in the Zürcher Oberland was celebrated after the Reformation; in Tann ZH (politically part of the municipality Dürnten), the Catholic parish church was built in 1963.

The village saw economic improvement only when industrialization took place during the 19th century. Rüti was connected to the cantonal road network in 1833 and to the Zurich-Uster-Rapperswil railroad line in 1859. The latter was electrified in 1932 and has been served by the Zurich S-Bahn since 1990.

In 2007, the 1200th anniversary was celebrated with various events and festivals.

== Geography ==
Rüti has an area of 10.06 km^{2} (3.88 sq mi). Of this area, 36.4% is used for agricultural purposes, while 35.4% is forested. Of the rest of the land, 26.9% is settled (buildings or roads) and the remainder (1.4%) is non-productive (rivers, glaciers or mountains). In 1996 housing and buildings made up 19.9% of the total area, while transportation infrastructure made up the rest (7%). Of the total unproductive area, water (streams and lakes) made up 0.8% of the area. As of 2007 25.9% of the total municipal area was undergoing some type of construction.

The municipality is located on at the confluence of the rivers Jona and Schwarz. It includes the hamlets of Weid, Moos, Weier and Fägswil. It grew up around the Rüti Monastery, which was built at the bridge along the pilgrimage route through the Thurgau to Einsiedeln Abbey.

== Economy ==
Beginning in the Middle Ages, its hydropower was used for watermills along the Jona, later for textile production facilities. In the early 19th century, Rüti was one of the centers of the industrialization in the southeastern parts of the canton of Zürich. In 1847, Caspar Honegger, a factory for weaving machines, was established in the Joweid valley (river Jona), later Maschinenfabrik Rüti AG with its global relations, and in the 1990s of Sulzer and the G + F group. A collection of weaving machines produced by this company is now housed in a museum in nearby Neuthal.

The Rüti hospital, later district Hospital, was built in 1875 (in 2000, for financial and political reasons it has been closed). The community services began its activities in 1897, the Swiss Post established an office in 1911. Today, the recruitment center of the Swiss Army and civil defense for the cantons of Zürich, Schaffhausen and Thurgau, is located in the former hospital buildings. Rüti has nine school buildings and a variety of shopping malls, too.

Rüti has an unemployment rate of 2.77%. As of 2005, there were 106 people employed in the primary economic sector and about 34 businesses involved in this sector. 1532 people are employed in the secondary sector and there are 111 businesses in this sector. 2431 people are employed in the tertiary sector, with 429 businesses in this sector. As of 2007 40% of the working population were employed full-time, and 60% were employed part-time.

== Demographics ==
Rüti has a population (as of 31 December 2020) of 12,494. As of 2007, 21.0% of the population was made up of foreign nationals. As of 2008 the gender distribution of the population was 49.7% male and 50.3% female. Over the last 10 years the population has grown at a rate of 7.4%. Most of the population (as of 2000) speaks German (85.5%), with Italian being second most common ( 4.6%) and Serbo-Croatian being third ( 2.0%).

In the 2007 election the most popular party was the SVP which received 36.1% of the vote. The next three most popular parties were the SPS (16.9%), the CVP (12.2%) and the CSP (11.5%).

The age distribution of the population (as of 2000) is children and teenagers (0–19 years old) make up 23.8% of the population, while adults (20–64 years old) make up 61.5% and seniors (over 64 years old) make up 14.7%. The entire Swiss population is generally well educated. In Rüti about 69.9% of the population (between age 25-64) have completed either non-mandatory upper secondary education or additional higher education (either university or a Fachhochschule). There are 4691 households in Rüti.

As of 2008 there were 3871 Catholics and 4102 Protestants in Rüti. In the 2000 census, religion was broken down into several smaller categories. From the 2000 census, 41.5% were some type of Protestant, with 38% belonging to the Swiss Reformed Church and 3.5% belonging to other Protestant churches. 35.6% of the population were Catholic. Of the rest of the population, 7.5% were Muslim, 9.6% belonged to another religion (not listed), 3.6% did not give a religion, and 8.5% were atheist or agnostic.

Historical population

Year	Pop.	±% p.a.
1634	139	—
1764	701	+1.25%
1850	1,292	+0.71%
1900	4,796	+2.66%

Year	Pop.	±% p.a.
1950	6,647	+0.65%
1970	9,546	+1.83%
1990	10,513	+0.48%

1634 population not including Fägswil.

== Transport ==
In 1833, Rüti was connected to the cantonal road network (since the 1980s the Oberland Autobahn, A53 highway). In 1859, the Zürich-Rapperswil railway was established, electrified in 1932, and is now part of the S-Bahn Zürich. Rüti ZH railway station is a stop of the lines S15 and S5; its train station is a 28-minute (S5) ride from Zürich Hauptbahnhof. Tösstalbahn (S-Bahn Zürich line S26) is ending in Rüti.

== Sport ==
Fussball Club Rüti is the town's football club. Founded in 1930, they play at Schützenwiese, on Scheibenstrasse, a stadium built in 1956. As of the 2019–20 season, the club plays in the 2. Liga Interregional Group 6, the fifth tier of football in Switzerland.

== Rüti today ==
As of the end of 2023, Rüti had a population of 12,862 residents. The municipality first surpassed the 10,000 population mark in 1971/1972.

== Sustainable Architecture ==
In Rüti, Zürich, efforts are being made to promote sustainable construction and efficient use of resources. A notable example is the "Generationenhaus," which utilizes regional, eco-friendly materials and is designed to be deconstructed with minimal environmental impact after 200 years. More information about this project can be found on their website. This showcases a forward-thinking approach to sustainable architecture.

== Notable people ==
- Albin Zollinger (1895–1941) a Swiss writer, brought up in Rüti
- Albert Zweifel (born 1949 in Rüti) a former professional cyclo-cross cyclist
- Monika Rieder (born 1974 in Rüti) a Swiss sport shooter, competed at the 2004 Summer Olympics
- Enrico De Maria (born 1976 in Rüti) a Swiss Olympic Star class sailor, competed at the 2004, 2008 and 2012 Summer Olympics
