= Tann, Switzerland =

Tann
- Municipality
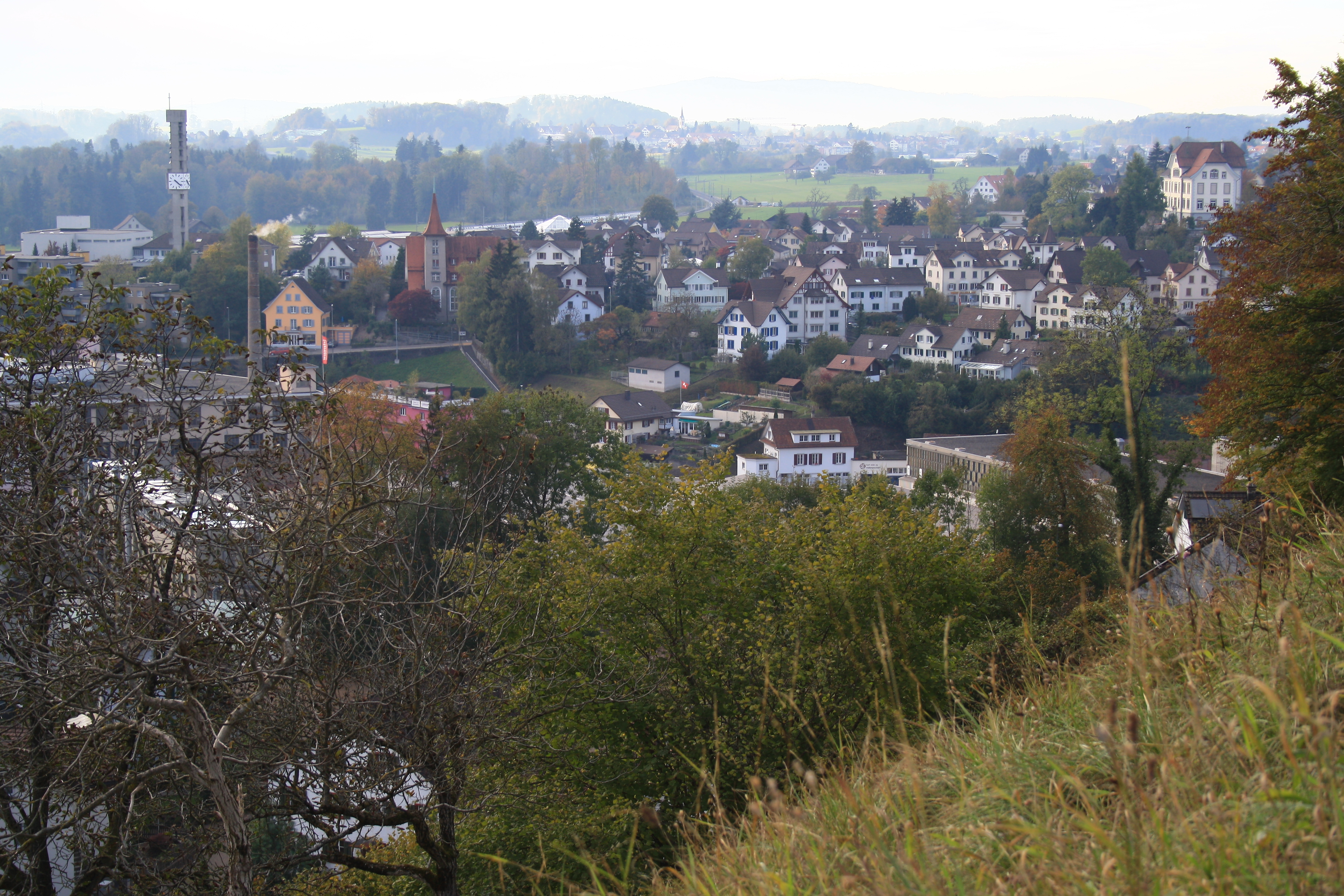
- Tann as seen from Haltberg in Rüti, Pfannenstiel in the far background (October 2009)
- Location of Tann
- Location within Switzerland Location within Canton of Zurich
- Coordinates: 47°15.78′N 8°51.05′E
- Country: Switzerland
- Canton: Zurich
- District: Hinwil
- Municipality: Dürnten
- Elevation: 494 m (1,621 ft)

Population (December 2007)
  - Total: 3,009
- Time zone: UTC+01:00 (CET)
  - Summer (DST): UTC+02:00 (CEST)
- Postal code: 8632
- SFOS number: 0113
- ISO 3166 code: CH-ZH
- Surrounded by: Bubikon, Rüti, Wald
- Website: www.duernten.ch

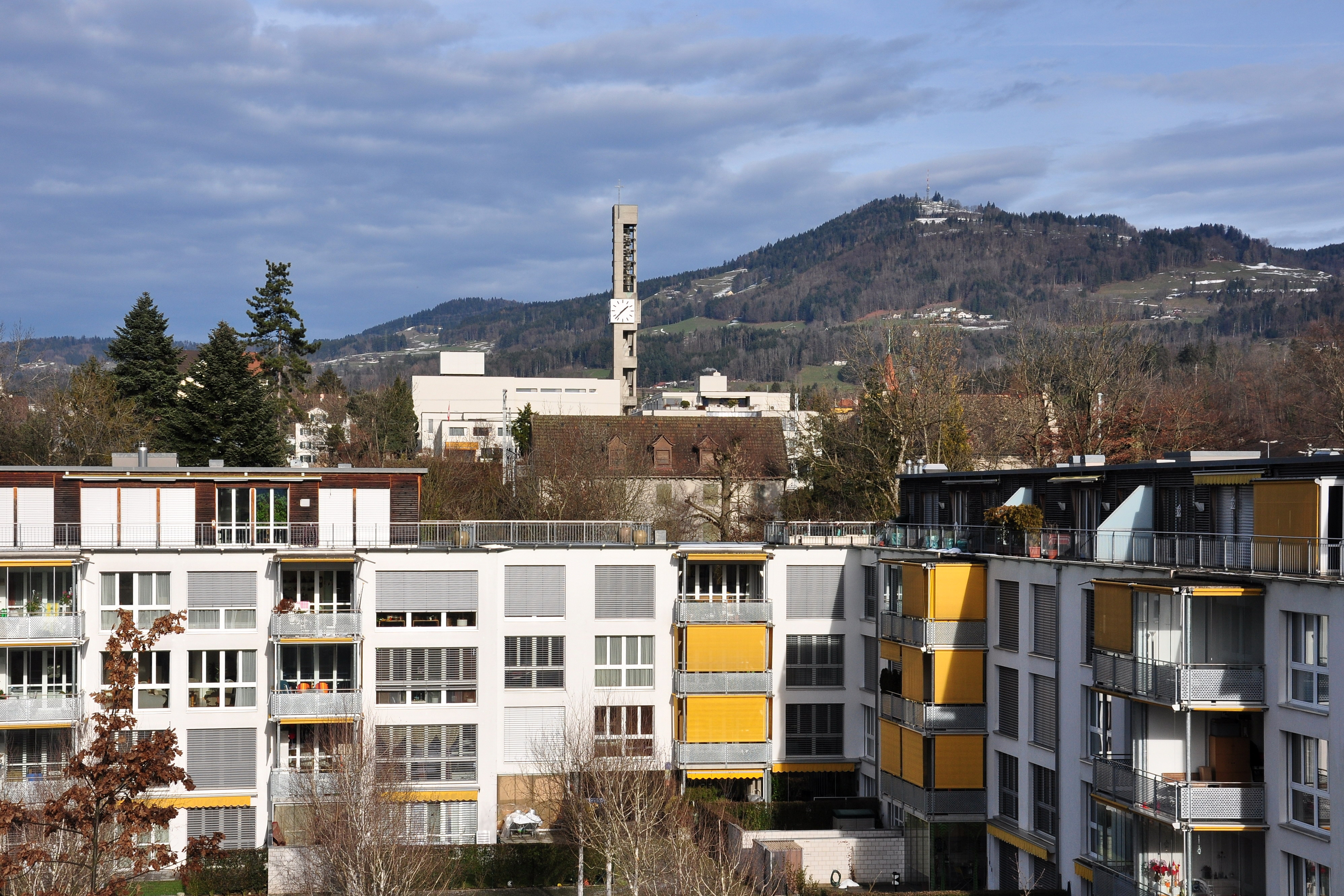
Catholic church in Tann and Bachtel hill, as seen from Rüti Schanz

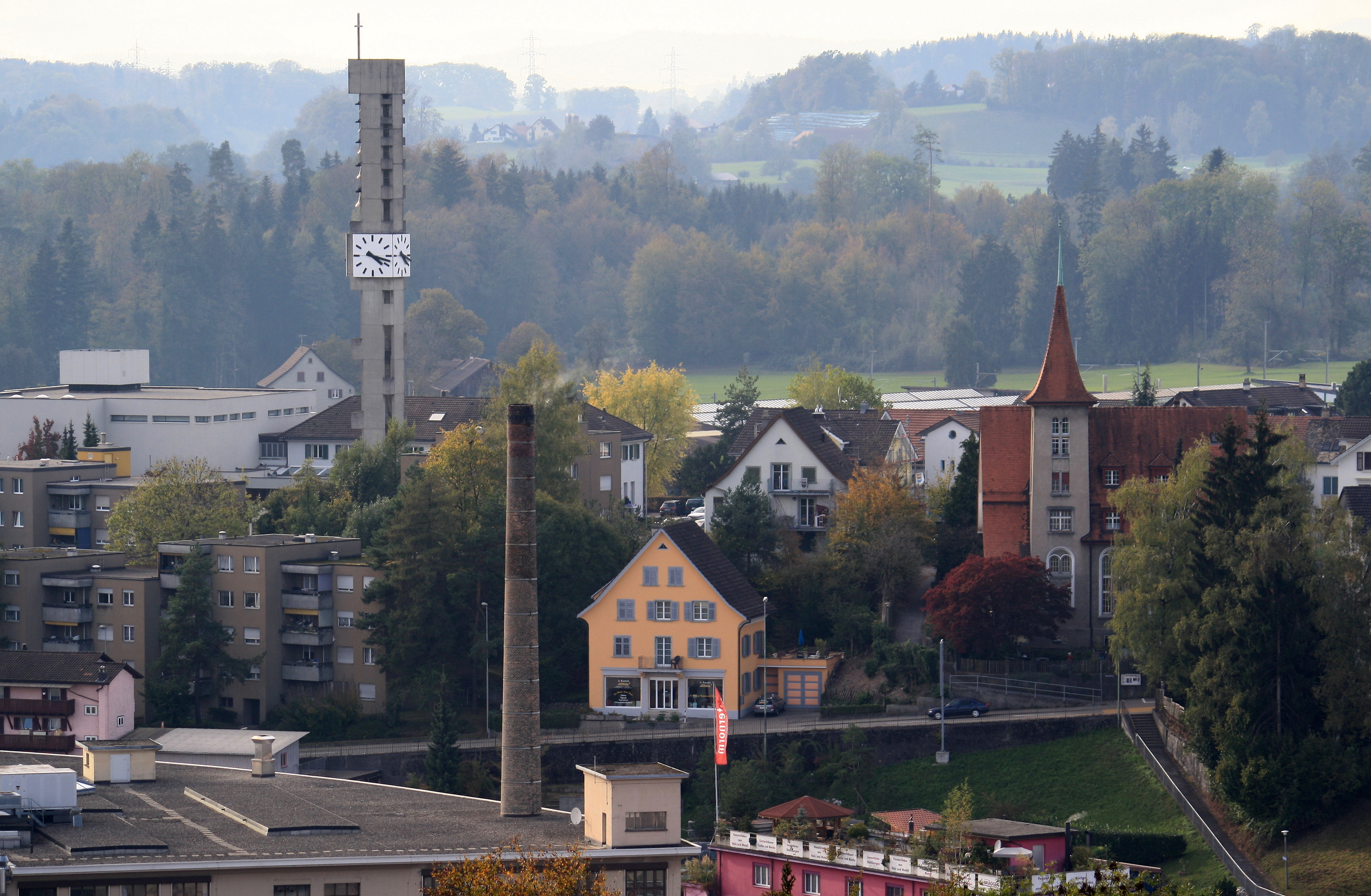
Catholic and Methodist church in Tann

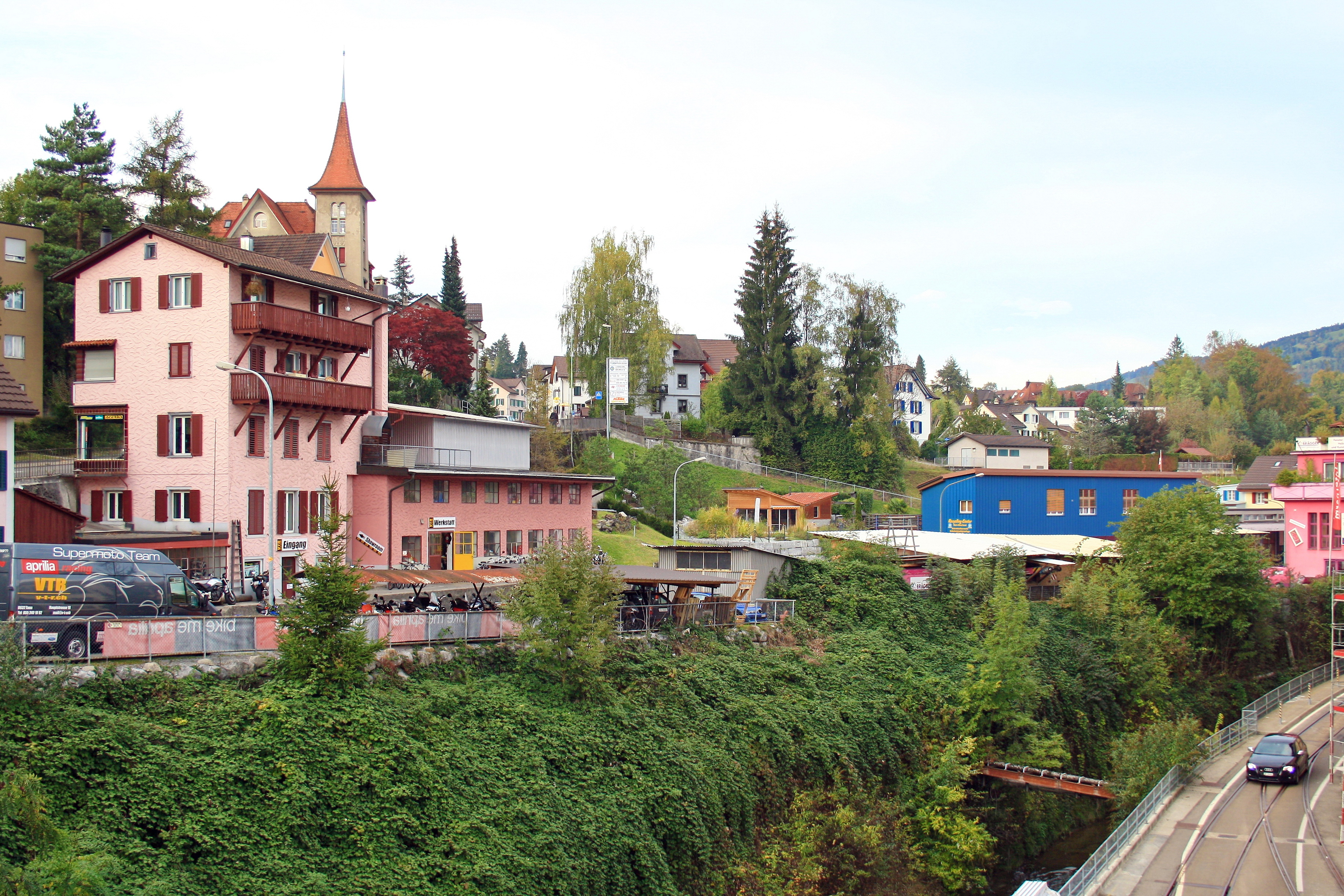
Joweid and Jona river in the foreground, Bachtel to the right

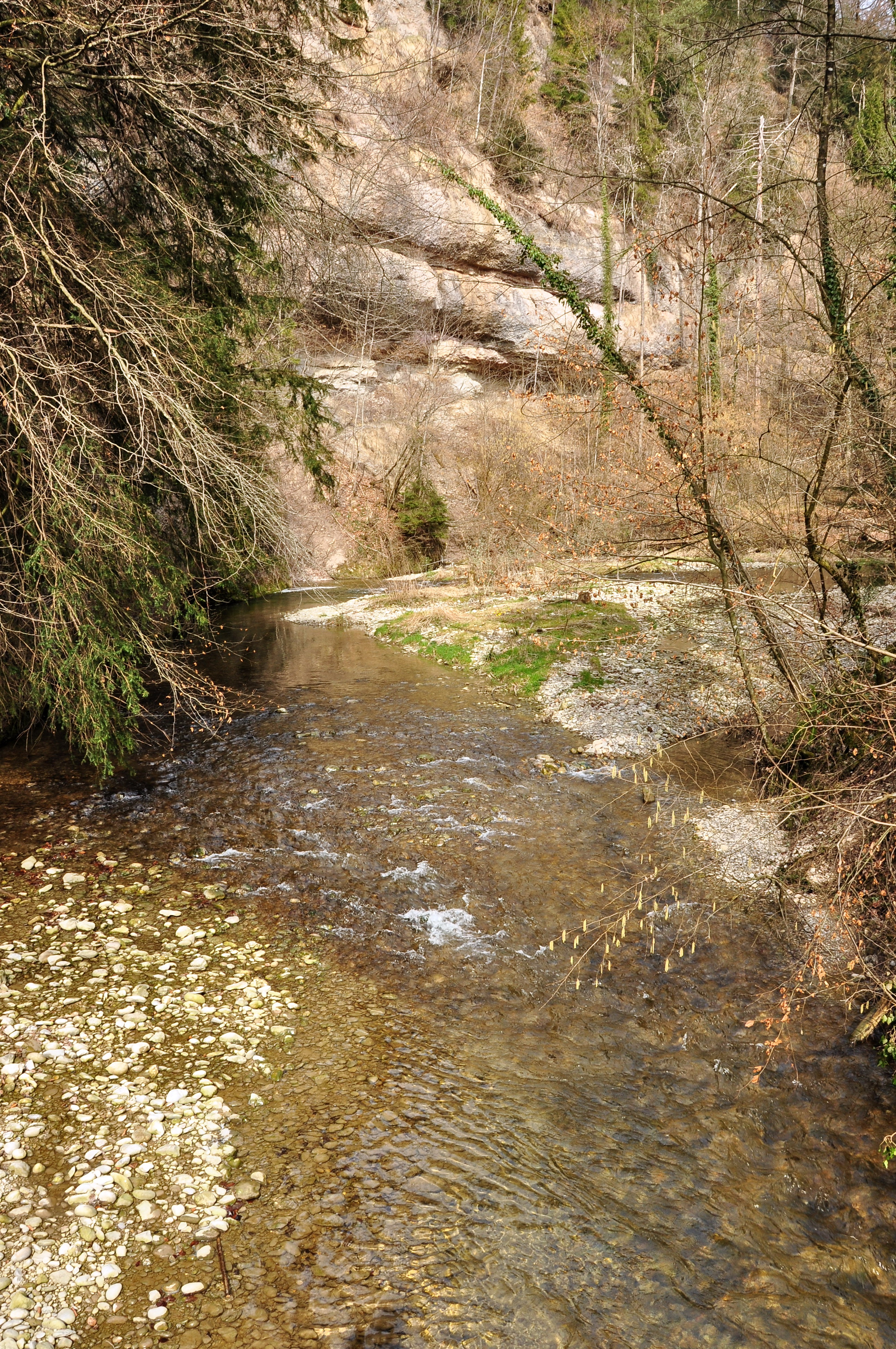
Tannertobel

Tann (German pronunciation: [tan]) is a village in the municipality of Dürnten in the district of Hinwil in the canton of Zurich, Switzerland.

== Geography ==
Aerial view from 800 m by Walter Mittelholzer (1925)

Tann is located in the Zürcher Oberland, in the south of Dürnten, and is geographically part of the southern municipality of Rüti. Jona river is flowing through the eastern Joweid and Tannertobel, a small river valley.

== Demographics ==
Tann belongs politically to the municipality of Dürnten and is its biggest village: 47% of 6,406 inhabitants are living in Tann (as of 2026). Four of a total of five school houses are located in Tann: Blatt, Tannenbühl, Bogenacker, and Nauen (high school level). With the neighbouring municipality of Rüti, Tann shares a wide variety of administrative structures among them the Roman Catholic Church community and electric power administration. In Tann is also the Reformed Methodist Church of Rüti-Wald-Hombrechtikon located.

== Transportation ==
Tann-Dürnten railway station, in the village, is a stop on the Zurich S-Bahn service S26 (Tösstalbahn) between Winterthur and Rüti respectively Rapperswil. The train station had been built in 1930. The bus line operator Verkehrsbetriebe Zürichsee und Oberland (VZO) provides its services for the regions of the Oberland and the upper northeastern Lake Zurich shore.

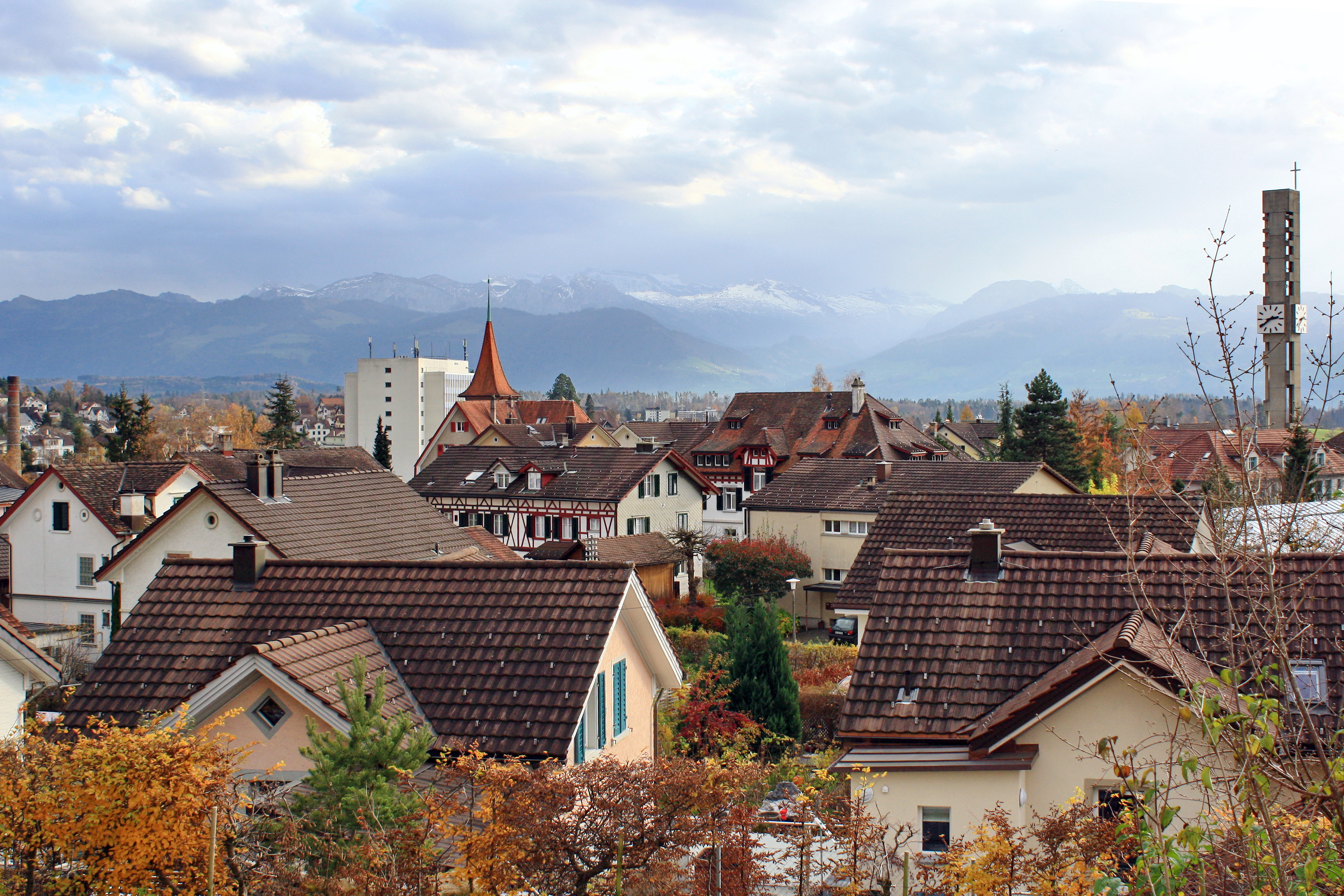
