= Jona (river) =

River in the Swiss cantons of Zürich and St. Gallen

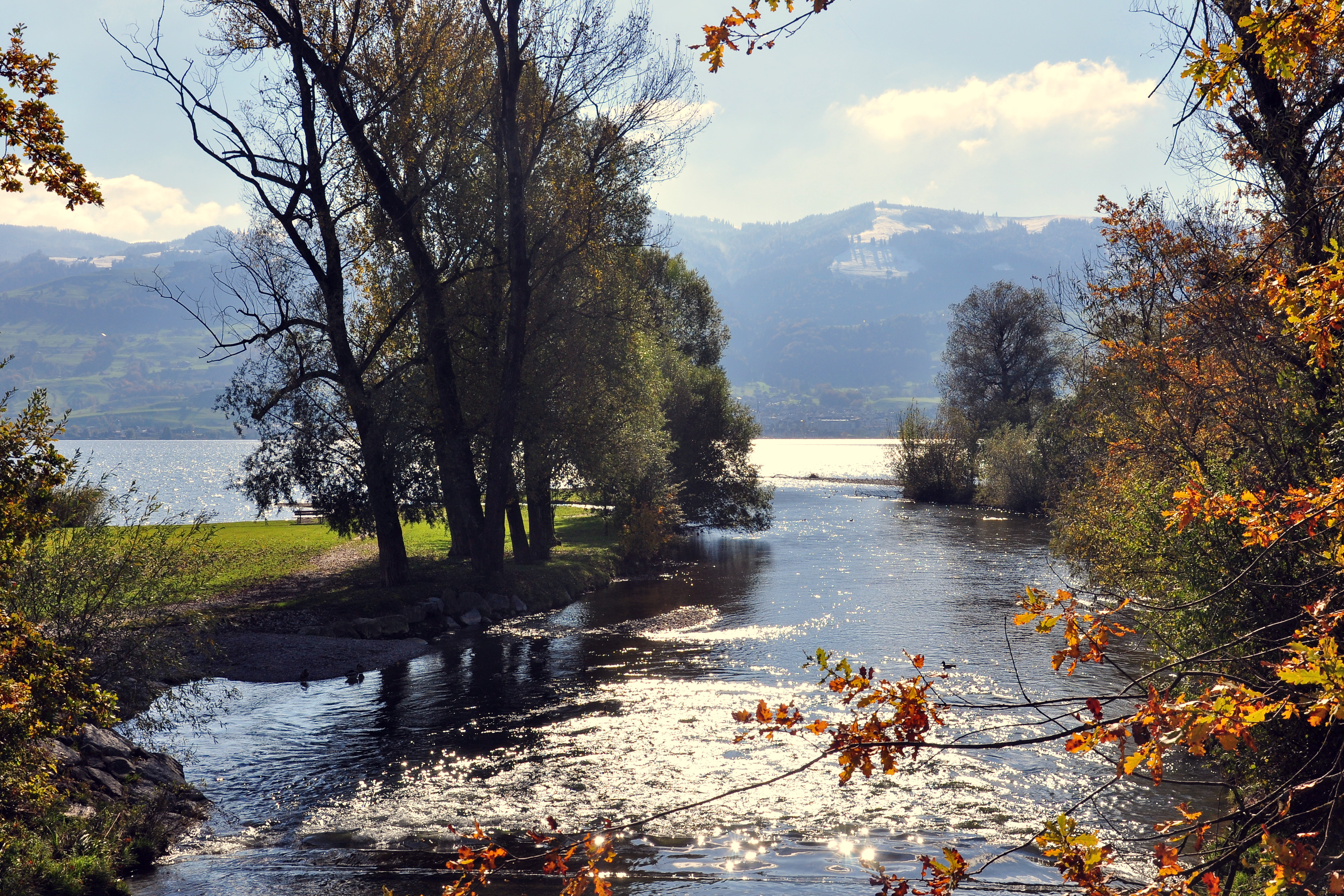
- The Jona at its mouth in Jona-Busskirch, Obersee in the background (October 2009)

Location
- Country: Switzerland
- Cantons: St. Gallen, Zürich

Physical characteristics
- Source
  - location: Bachtel mountain
  - elevation: 950 metres (3,117 ft) MAMSL
- Mouth
  - location: Obersee (Zürichsee) near Busskirch (Rapperswil-Jona)
  - coordinates: 47.2153°N 8.8438°E
  - elevation: 406 metres (1,332 ft) MAMSL
- Length: 18.8 km (11.7 mi)
- Basin size: 78.4 km^{2} (30.3 sq mi)

Basin features
- Progression: Lake Zürich→ Limmat→ Aare→ Rhine→ North Sea

The Jona is a river in the Swiss cantons of Zürich and St. Gallen, forming partly their mutual border, and one of the main tributaries of Obersee, Lake Zurich.

== Geography ==
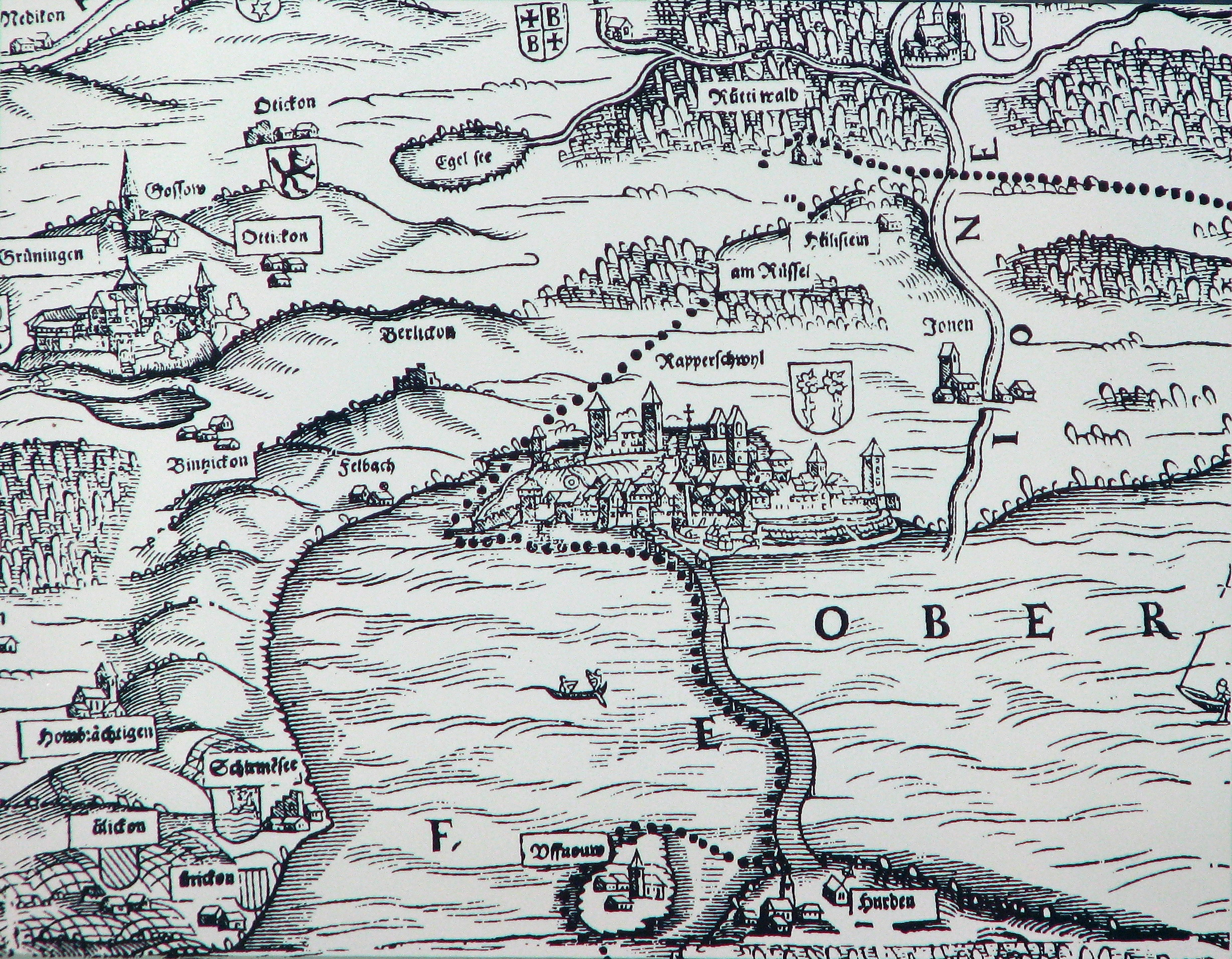
Rapperswil, Seedamm and medieval lake crossing between Rapperswil and Hurden, Obersee (Zürichsee) (upper Lake Zürich) and Jona (Jonen) on the so-called Murerplan (1566)

The Jona rises on the eastern slope of Bachtel mountain near Gibswil in the canton of Zurich. Gibswil marks the drainage divide between the rivers Jona and Töss. Flowing eastward through a small valley and passing an impressive waterfall, the river changes its direction towards south by a ravine, which is crossed by a viaduct of the Tösstalbahn (operated by the S26 service of Zürich S-Bahn). From there, it continues southward until Wald, where the Jona turns to the west, dividing the municipalities of Dürnten and Rüti, then passing the village of Tann and Rüti in the so-called Tannertobel (lit. 'Tann Ravine'). Once again, it changes its direction, flowing now southward again, slightly meandering through Rüti and the so-called Joner Wald (lit. 'Jona Forest'), where it is followed (and eventually crossed) by the Wallisellen–Uster–Rapperswil railway line (operated by Zürich S-Bahn lines S5 and S15). In the Jona Forest, the river follows the cantonal border between St. Gallen and Zurich. It underneaths the Oberland Autobahn (A53 highway), at the same time also reaching the canton of St. Gallen and the Rapperswil-Jona municipality. After flowing in a nearly straight line through the former village center of Jona, it is crossed by the Rapperswil–Ziegelbrücke railway line (operated by the Voralpen-Express and St. Gallen S-Bahn lines S4, S6 and S17) before it finally flows out into Obersee, the upper section of Lake Zurich (Zürichsee), forming a small river delta at Stampf lido near Busskirch.

The length of the Jona measures nearly 20 kilometres (12.4 mi), rising at 950 metres (3,117 ft) a.s.l. and flowing in Obersee at 406 metres (1,332 ft) a.s.l. The river belongs to the Limmat→Aar→Rhine system. Its drainage basin measures 65 square kilometres (25.1 mi^{2}).

== History ==
The river's name was first mentioned in 834 AD, the former municipality Jona was named much later. It is assumed that the name originates as either Celtic Jauna (the cold one) – the Jona is still largely determined by forest area – or, as Indo-European yamam, meaning stream. Latest interpretations say that the Indo-European word jeu roughly means to move, followed by the Old High German name Jouna .

Its hydropower was used for a larger number of medieval watermills along the small river. As a renewable source, in the 19th century, the river was important for industrialization of the textile industry of the communities of Wald, Rüti, and Rapperswil-Jona.

== Gallery ==
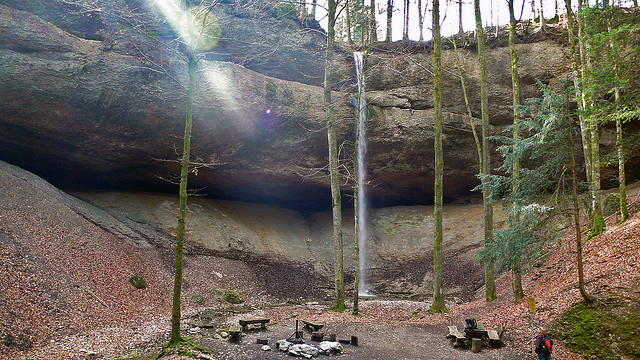
Wissengubel Fall (near Gibswil)

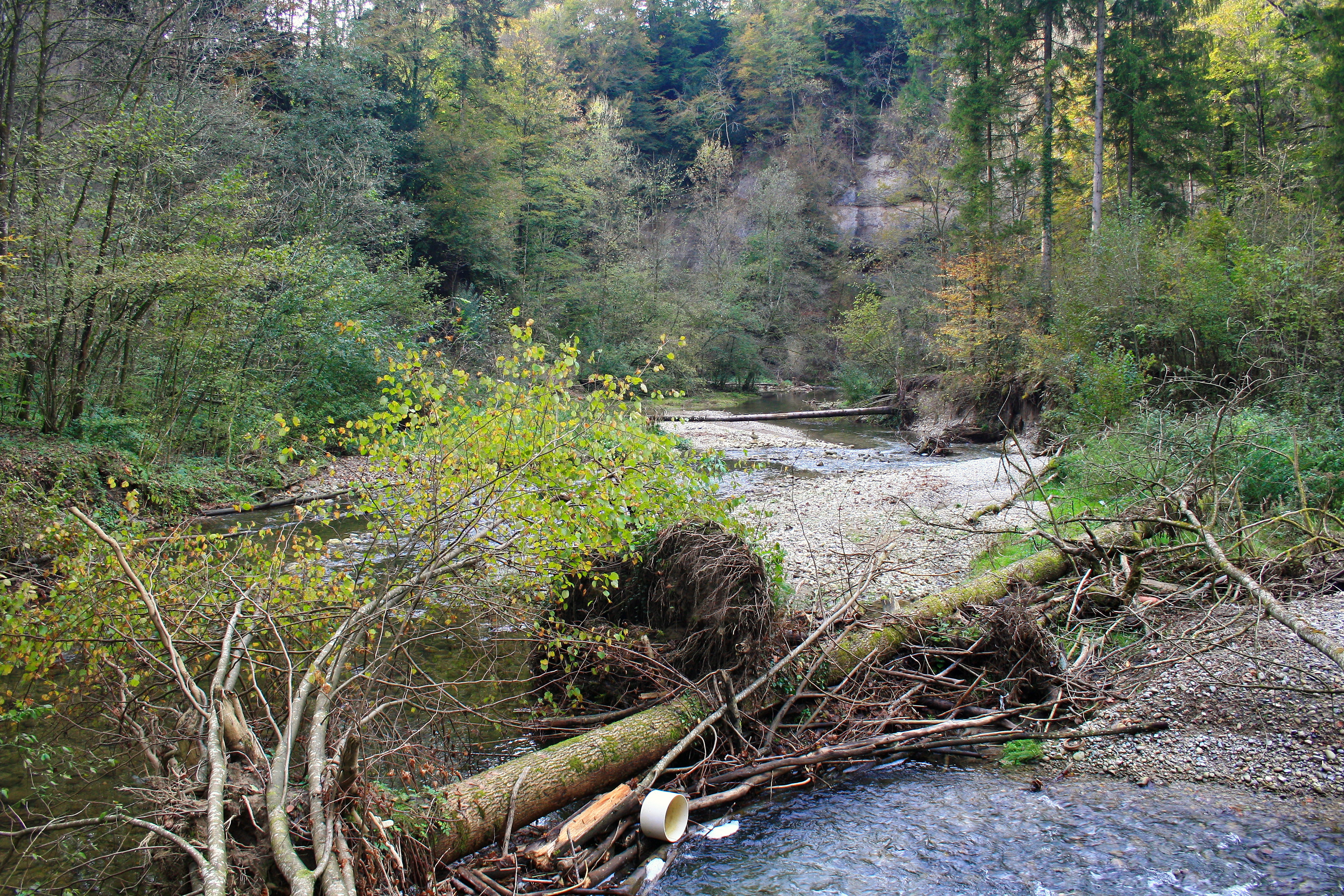
Tannertobel between Tann and Rüti

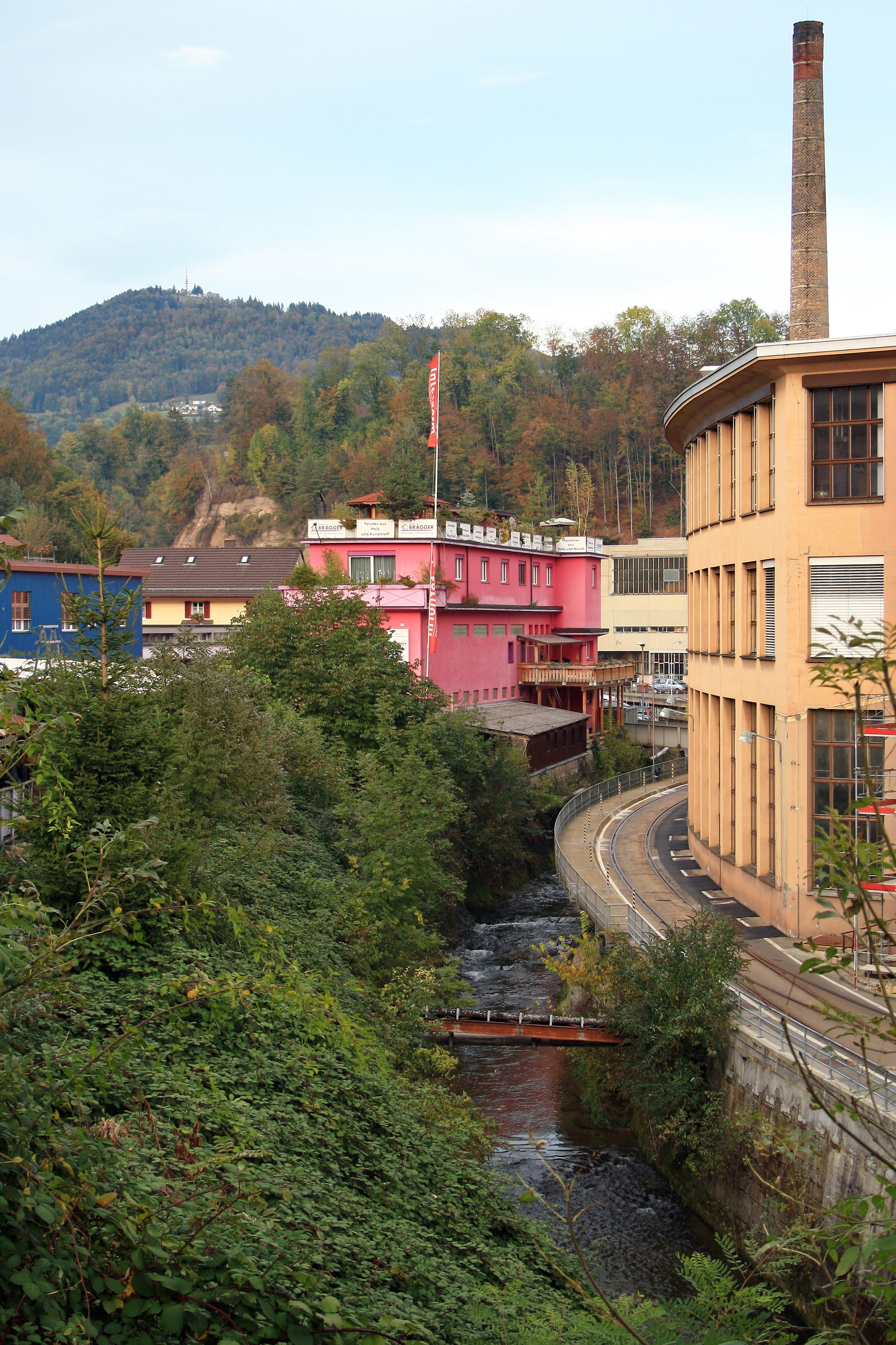
Joweid (= Jona river meadow) in Rüti, Bachtel mountain in the background

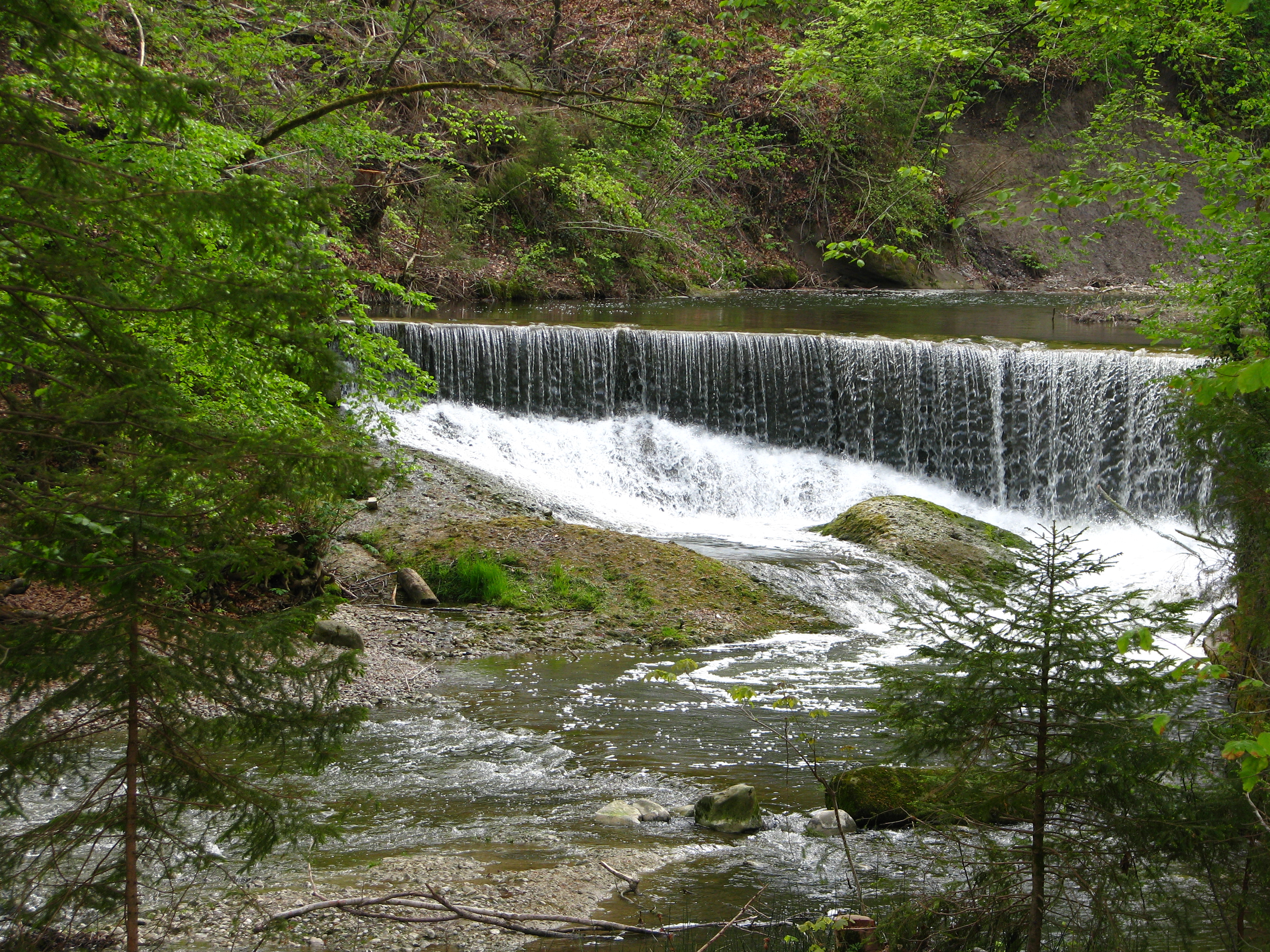
The Jona at Holzwies in Jona

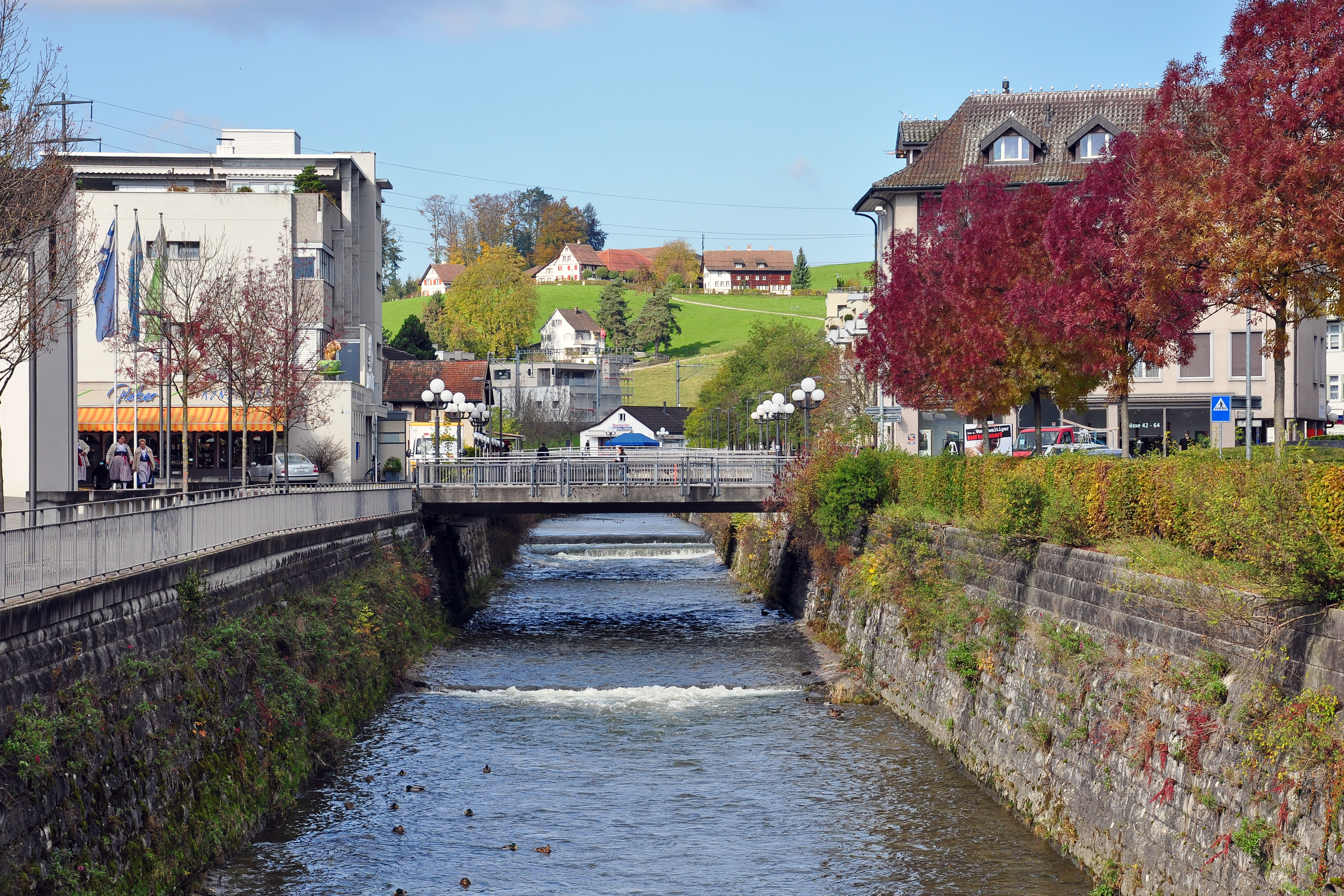
The river canal within the village of Jona

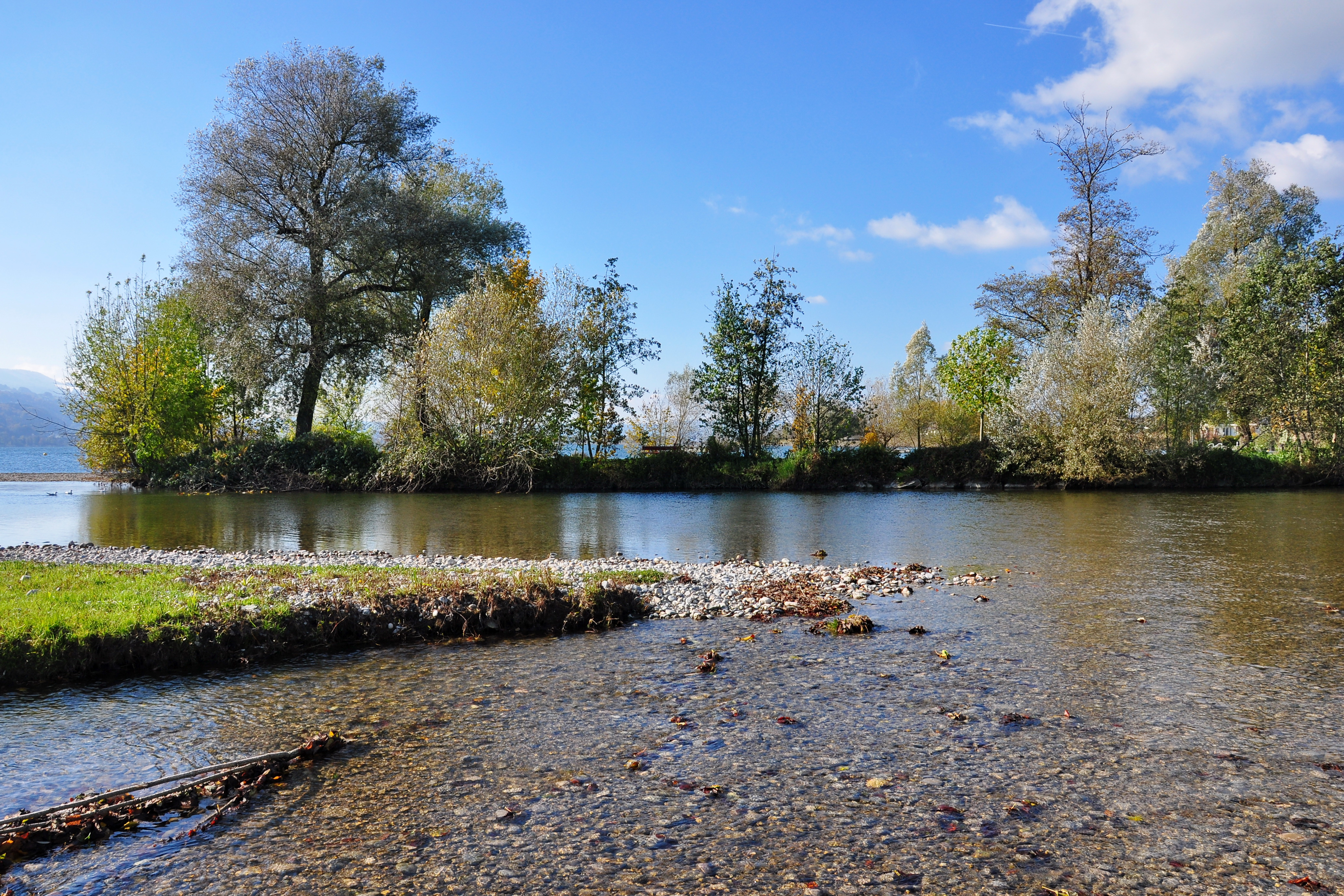
River delta, called Stampf, at Obersee

== See also ==
- List of rivers of Switzerland
