= Wald, Switzerland =

Wald may refer to the following municipalities in Switzerland:

- Wald, Berne (Wald BE)
- Wald, Appenzell (Wald AR)
- Wald, Zurich (Wald ZH)

== See also ==
- Wald (disambiguation)
