= Fischenthal =

- Municipality
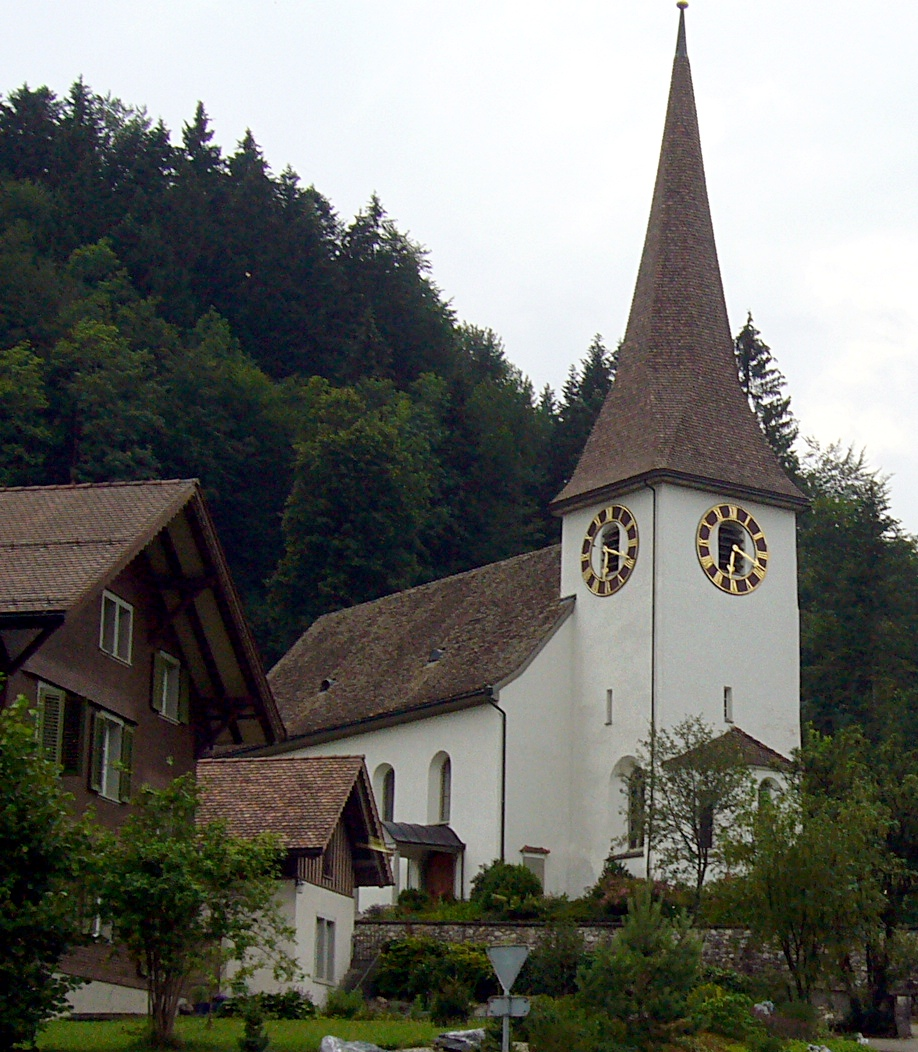
- Kirche (Church) in Fischenthal

- Flag Coat of arms
- Location of Fischenthal
- Location within Switzerland Location within Canton of Zurich
- Coordinates: 47°20′N 8°55′E
- Country: Switzerland
- Canton: Zurich
- District: Hinwil

Area
  - Total: 30.25 km^{2} (11.68 sq mi)
- Elevation: 840 m (2,760 ft)

Population (December 2020)
  - Total: 2,501
  - Density: 82.68/km^{2} (214.1/sq mi)
- Time zone: UTC+01:00 (CET)
  - Summer (DST): UTC+02:00 (CEST)
- Postal code: 8000
- SFOS number: 114
- ISO 3166 code: CH-ZH
- Localities: Steg, Fischenthal and Gibswil
- Surrounded by: Bäretswil, Bauma, Fischingen (TG), Goldingen (SG), Hinwil, Mosnang (SG), Sternenberg, Wald
- Website: www.fischenthal.ch

Fischenthal is a village and a municipality in the district of Hinwil in the canton of Zürich in Switzerland. Besides the village of Fischenthal, it includes the villages of Gibswil and Steg, as well as nearly 100 smaller settlements.

== History ==
Aerial view from 200 m (660 ft) by Walter Mittelholzer (1919)

Fischenthal is first mentioned in 878 as Fiskinestal. During the early Middle Ages, the area formed part of the estates and alpine pastures associated with monastic and noble landholdings in the upper Töss valley. Its settlement structure developed around scattered farms and hamlets typical of the Zürcher Oberland.

In the late medieval period, Fischenthal gradually came under the authority of the city of Zurich, which expanded its control over the upper Töss valley. The local economy was shaped by livestock farming, forestry, and seasonal alpine agriculture, supplemented by small-scale ironworks and cottage industry.

After the Reformation in the 16th century, Fischenthal was incorporated into the Protestant ecclesiastical and administrative system of the Canton of Zurich. The village church and local institutions became integrated into Zurich’s parish network.

During the 18th and 19th centuries, industrialization in the Zürcher Oberland affected the region unevenly. While nearby communities grew through textile and mechanical manufacturing, Fischenthal remained predominantly rural, with many residents relying on agriculture, wood production, and later commuting to industrial centers.

After the creation of the modern Swiss federal state in 1848, Fischenthal was incorporated into the cantonal district administration. Although its population occasionally declined due to limited industrial development and outward migration, the municipality has retained its traditional landscape of forests, hamlets, and mountain terrain.

Today, Fischenthal is noted for being both one of the largest and most sparsely populated municipalities of the Canton of Zurich, reflecting its long history as a rural mountain community in the upper Töss valley.

== Geography ==
Fischenthal is situated in the upper Töss Valley and is the largest municipality, in terms of land area, in the canton of Zurich. The Jona river rises near the municipality. The municipality includes the mountain villages of Fischenthal, Gibswil and Steg as well as nearly 100 settlements scattered throughout the Tössbergland (Töss mountain land). Gibswil is known for the ski jumping hill Bachtelblick-Schanze and the cross-country skiing trail Panoramaloipe Gibswil.

Fischenthal has an area of 30.2 km^{2} (11.7 sq mi). Of this area, 31.6% is used for agricultural purposes, while 63.1% is forested. Of the rest of the land, 4% is settled (buildings or roads) and the remainder (1.3%) is non-productive (rivers, glaciers or mountains). In 1996 housing and buildings made up 2% of the total area, while transportation infrastructure made up the rest (2%). Of the total unproductive area, water (streams and lakes) made up 0.6% of the area. As of 2007 2.9% of the total municipal area was undergoing some type of construction.

== Demographics ==
Fischenthal has a population (as of 31 December 2020) of 2,501. with 11.8% foreign nationals. The gender distribution of the population was 51.2% male and 48.8% female.

In the 2007 election the most popular party was the SVP which received 52.6% of the vote. The next three most popular parties were the SPS (12.1%), the Green Party (8.9%) and the CSP (8.3%).

The age distribution of the population (as of 2000) is children and teenagers (0–19 years old) make up 31.1% of the population, while adults (20–64 years old) make up 57.1% and seniors (over 64 years old) make up 11.8%. The entire Swiss population is generally well educated. In Fischenthal about 70.9% of the population (between age 25-64) have completed either non-mandatory upper secondary education or additional higher education (either university or a Fachhochschule). There are 743 households in Fischenthal.

As of 2005, Fischenthal had an unemployment rate of 2.19%. As of 2007 28.8% of the working population were employed full-time, and 71.3% were employed part-time. In 2014, Fischenthal made regional news because it was forced to spend 87% of its fiscal budget on social support, mostly due to a single family which had recently moved to the village and which consumed a quarter of the municipality's budget or half a million francs in support and special education programs.

As of 2008 there were 476 Catholics and 1278 Protestants in Fischenthal. In the 2000 census, religion was broken down into several smaller categories. From the 2000 census, 60.5% were some type of Protestant, with 56.8% belonging to the Swiss Reformed Church and 3.7% belonging to other Protestant churches. 20.8% of the population were Catholic. Of the rest of the population, 0% were Muslim, 3.5% belonged to another religion (not listed), 4.6% did not give a religion, and 10.2% were atheist or agnostic.

The historical population is given in the following table:

year	population
1634	466
1771	1,789
1836	2,814
1850	2,394
1900	2,052
1941	1,694
1950	1,837
1960	1,987
1980	1,605
2000	1,961
2011	2,316

== Transport ==
Road 16, the Tösstalstrasse, passes through the municipalities three main villages of Steg, Fischenthal and Gibswil.

The road is paralleled by the Tösstal railway line, and the municipality is served by Steg station, Fischenthal station and Gibswil station. All three stations are stops on the Zurich S-Bahn service S26.

The closest airport is the Wangen Airport approximately 12 km from Gibswil.
