= Steg railway station =

Railway station in Canton of Zürich, Switzerland

Steg
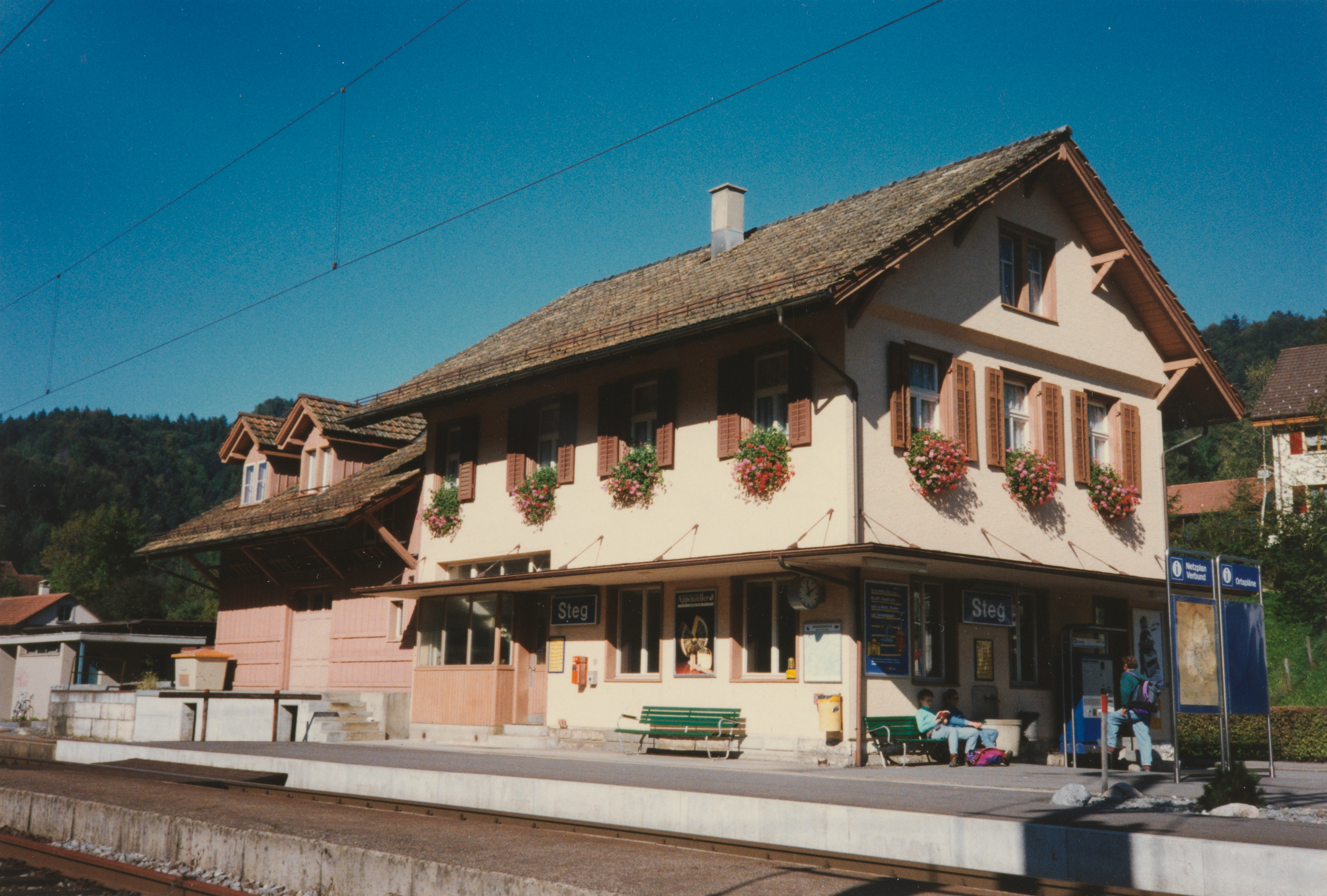
- Station in 1994

General information
- Location: Bahnhofstrasse; Steg; Fischenthal, Zurich; Switzerland
- Coordinates: 47.35395°N 8.932357°E
- Elevation: 694 m (2,277 ft)
- Owner: Swiss Federal Railways
- Operator: Thurbo
- Line: Tösstalbahn
- Platforms: 1 side platform
- Tracks: 1
- Connections
- Bus: PostAuto bus route 766; VZO bus route 854

Other information
- Fare zone: 173 (ZVV)

Services
Preceding station	Zurich S-Bahn	Following station
Bauma towards Winterthur	S26	Fischenthal towards Rüti ZH
Location
- Location within Switzerland Location within Canton of Zurich

Steg railway station, also known as Steg im Tösstal railway station, is a railway station in the Swiss canton of Zurich. The station is situated in the municipality of Fischenthal and takes its name from the nearby village of Steg (Töss Valley). It is located on the Töss Valley railway line (Tösstalbahn) between Winterthur and Rüti ZH, within fare zone 173 of the Zürcher Verkehrsverbund (ZVV).

== Services ==
The station is served by Zurich S-Bahn line S26.

- Zurich S-Bahn S26: half-hourly service between Winterthur and Rüti ZH

There is a bus stop adjacent to the railway station, which is served by buses of PostAuto and Verkehrsbetriebe Zürichsee und Oberland (VZO).

== See also ==
- Rail transport in Switzerland
