= Wald =

Wald is the German word for forest.

== Places ==
=== Austria ===
- Wald am Schoberpass, in Styria
- Wald im Pinzgau, in Salzburger Land

=== Germany ===
- Wald, Baden-Württemberg
- Wald, Upper Palatinate, in the district of Cham, Bavaria
- Wald (Allgäu), in the district of Ostallgäu, Bavaria

=== Switzerland ===
- Wald, Appenzell Ausserrhoden
- Wald, Bern
- Wald, Glarus
- Wald, Zürich

=== United States ===
- Wald, Alabama
- Wald, Iowa

== Other ==
- Wald test, a test in statistics
- We Almost Lost Detroit, a 1975 Reader's Digest book by John G. Fuller
- WALD, an American radio station
- Wald, a techno/dub/glitch album by Pole

== Surname ==
- Wald (surname)

== See also ==
- Walde
