= Gibswil railway station =

Railway station in Canton of Zürich, Switzerland

Gibswil
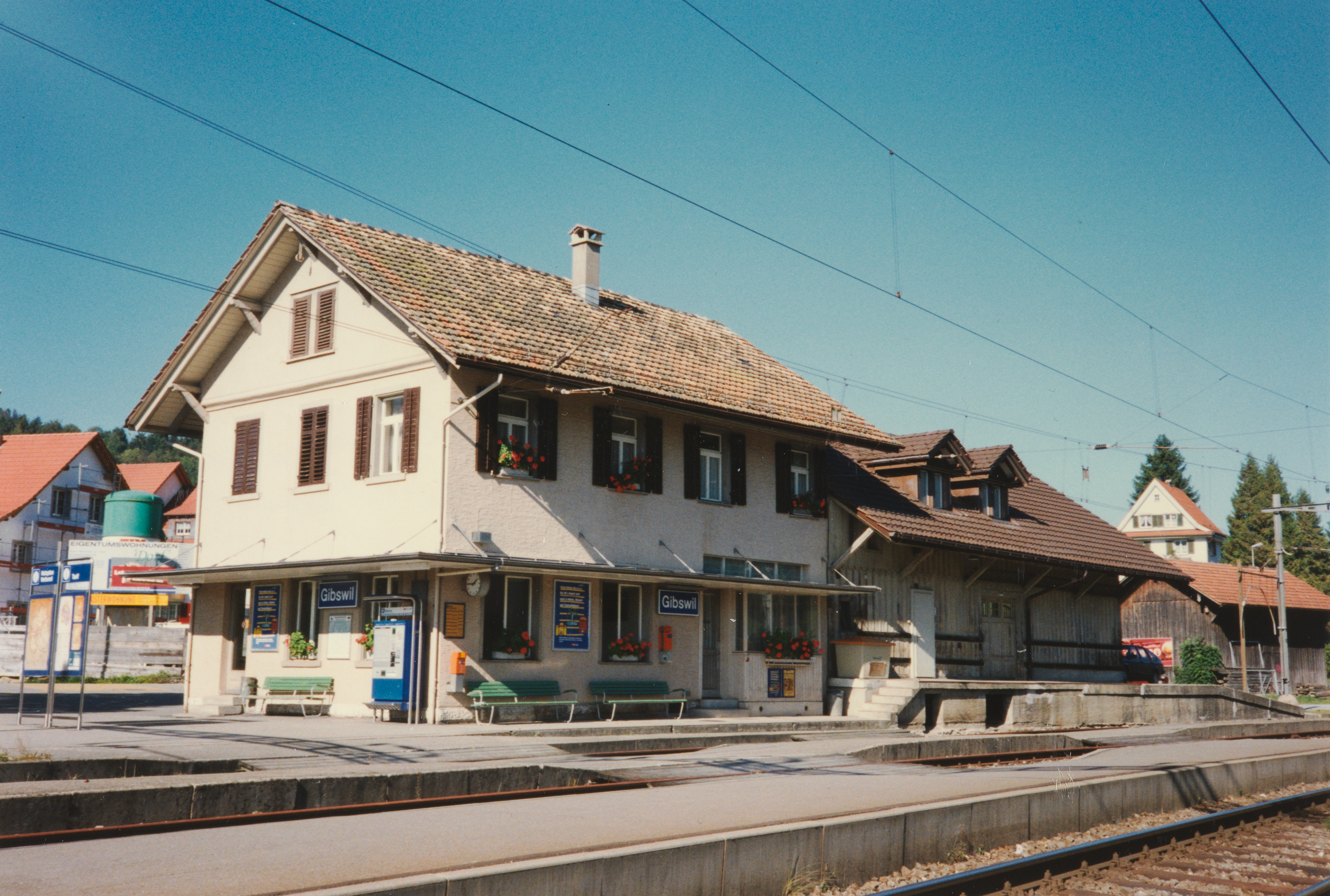
- Station in 1994

General information
- Location: Tösstalstrasse; Gibswil; Fischenthal, Zurich; Switzerland
- Coordinates: 47.313421°N 8.915663°E
- Elevation: 756 m (2,480 ft)
- Owner: Swiss Federal Railways
- Operator: Thurbo
- Line: Tösstalbahn
- Platforms: 1 side platform
- Tracks: 1
- Connections
- Bus: VZO bus route 854

Other information
- Fare zone: 173 (ZVV)

Services
| Preceding station | Zurich S-Bahn | Following station |
|---|---|---|
| Fischenthal towards Winterthur | S26 | Wald towards Rüti ZH |
Location
- Location within Switzerland Location within Canton of Zurich

Gibswil railway station is a railway station in the Swiss canton of Zurich. The station is situated in the municipality of Fischenthal (Jona Valley) and takes its name from the nearby village of Gibswil. It is located on the Töss Valley railway line (Tösstalbahn) between Winterthur and Rüti ZH, within fare zone 173 of the Zürcher Verkehrsverbund (ZVV).

== Services ==
The station is served by Zurich S-Bahn line S26.

- Zurich S-Bahn S26: half-hourly service between Winterthur and Rüti ZH

Adjacent to the railway station there is a bus stop, which is served by a bus line of Verkehrsbetriebe Zürichsee und Oberland (VZO).

== See also ==
- Rail transport in Switzerland
