= Saland railway station =

Railway station in Canton of Zürich, Switzerland

Saland
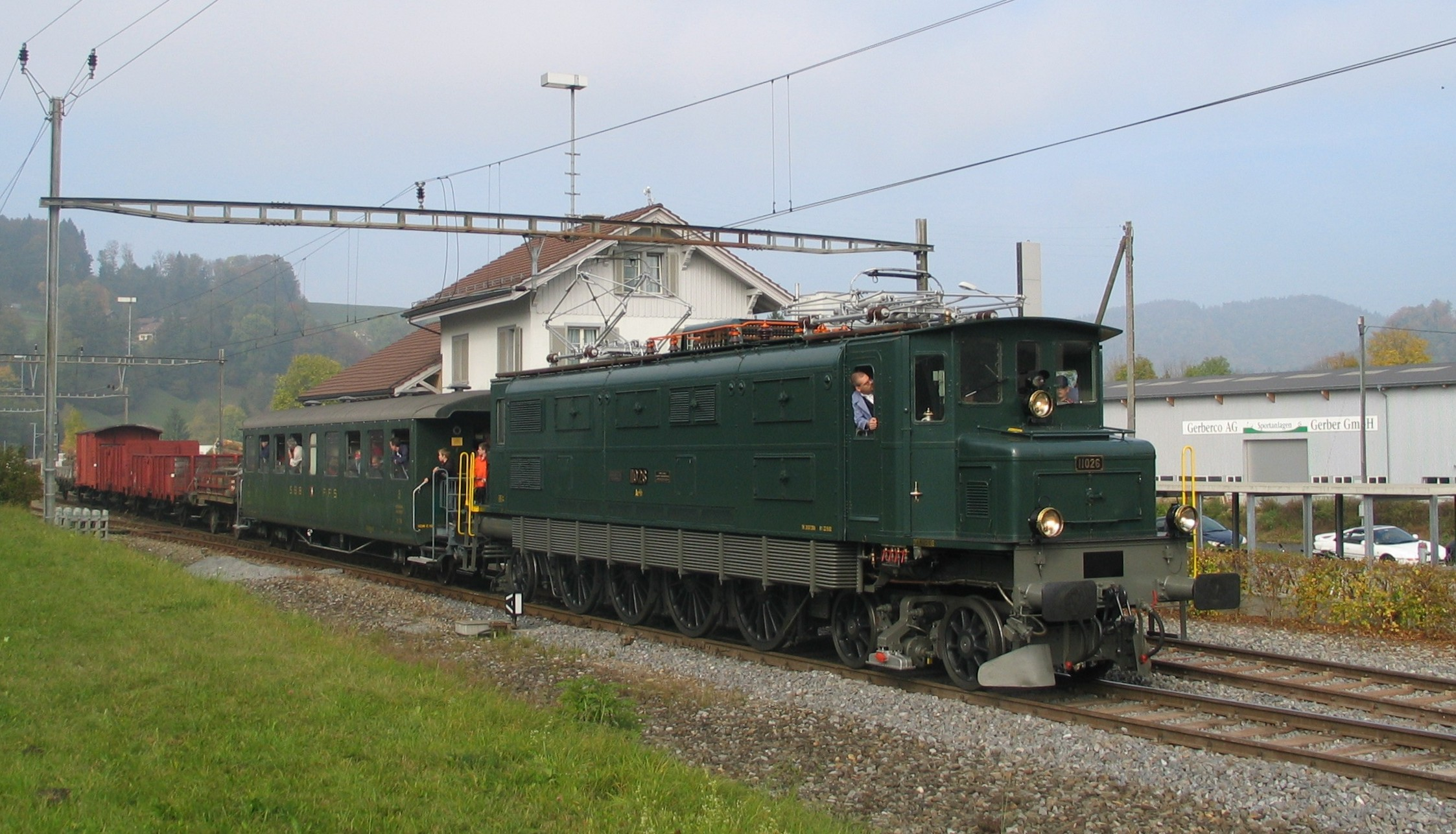
- Preserved electric locomotive passing through Saland station

General information
- Location: Tösstalstrasse, Saland, Bauma, Canton of Zurich, Switzerland
- Coordinates: 47.393839°N 8.854884°E
- Elevation: 600 m (2,000 ft)
- Owner: Swiss Federal Railways
- Operator: Thurbo
- Line: Tösstalbahn
- Platforms: 2 side platforms
- Tracks: 2

Other information
- Fare zone: 172 (ZVV)

Services
Preceding station	Zurich S-Bahn	Following station
Wila towards Winterthur	S26	Bauma towards Rüti ZH
Location
- Location within Switzerland Location within Canton of Zurich

Saland railway station is a railway station in the Swiss canton of Zurich. The station is situated in the municipality of Bauma and takes its name from the nearby village of Saland (Töss Valley). It is located on the Töss Valley railway line (Tösstalbahn) between Winterthur and Rüti ZH, within fare zone 172 of the Zürcher Verkehrsverbund (ZVV).

== Services ==
The station is served by Zurich S-Bahn line S26.

- Zurich S-Bahn S26: half-hourly service between Winterthur and Rüti ZH

== See also ==
- Rail transport in Switzerland
