= Fischenthal railway station =

Railway station in Fischenthal, Switzerland

Fischenthal
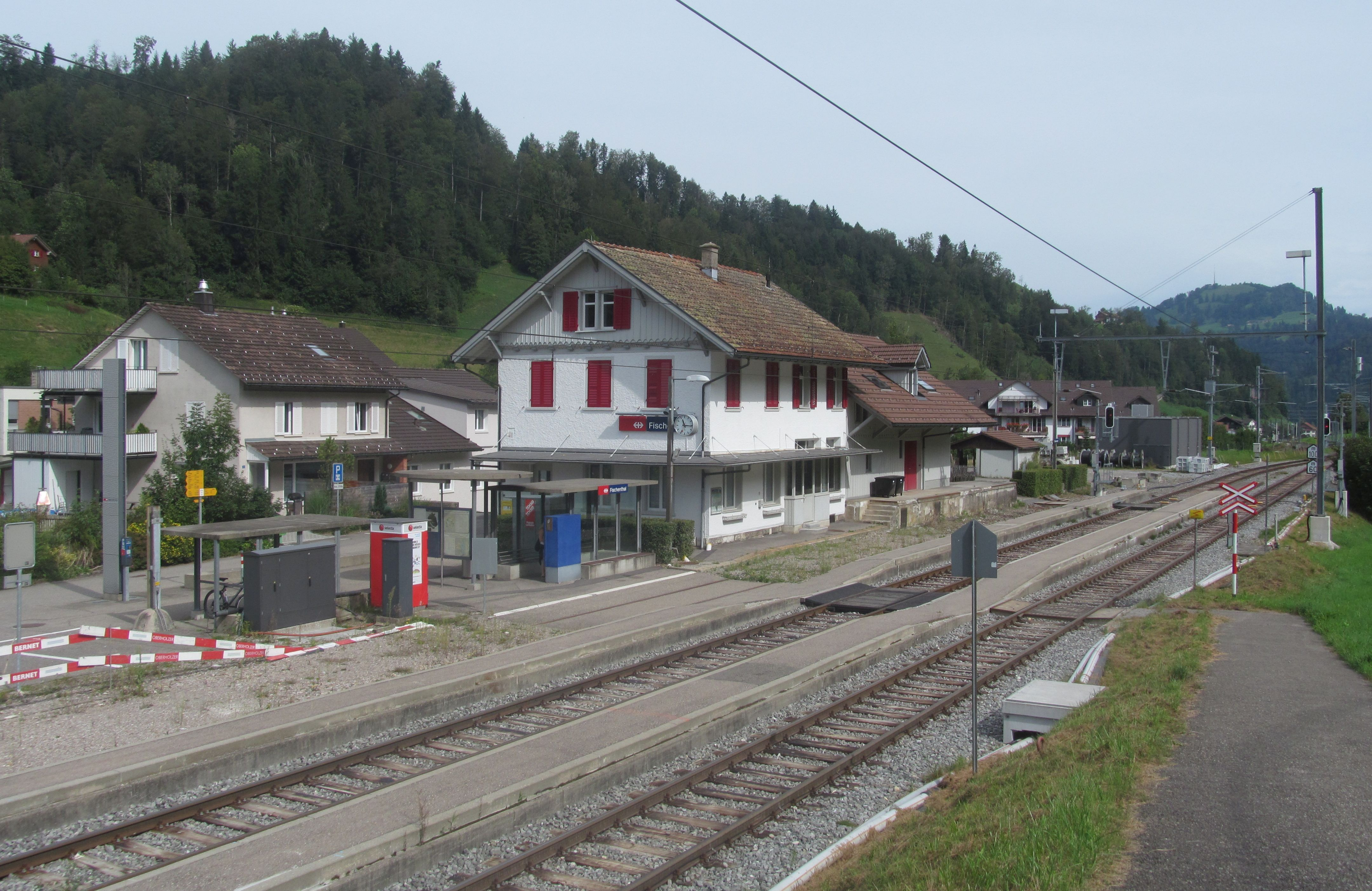
- The station in 2016

General information
- Location: Stationsstrasse; Fischenthal, Zurich; Switzerland
- Coordinates: 47.333384°N 8.923184°E
- Elevation: 734 m (2,408 ft)
- Owner: Swiss Federal Railways
- Operator: Thurbo
- Line: Tösstalbahn
- Platforms: 2 side platforms
- Tracks: 2
- Connections
- Bus: VZO bus route 854

Other information
- Fare zone: 173 (ZVV)

Services
Preceding station	Zurich S-Bahn	Following station
Steg towards Winterthur	S26	Gibswil towards Rüti ZH
Location
- Location within Switzerland Location within Canton of Zurich

Fischenthal railway station is a railway station in the Swiss canton of Zurich, and the municipality of Fischenthal. It is located on the Töss Valley railway line (Tösstalbahn) between Winterthur and Rüti ZH, within fare zone 173 of the Zürcher Verkehrsverbund (ZVV).

== Service ==
The station is served by Zurich S-Bahn line S26.

- Zurich S-Bahn S26: half-hourly service between Winterthur and Rüti ZH

A nearby bus stop (Fischenthal, Bahnhof) is served by a bus line of Verkehrsbetriebe Zürichsee und Oberland (VZO).

== See also ==
- Rail transport in Switzerland
