= Tann-Dürnten railway station =

Railway station in Switzerland

Tann-Dürnten
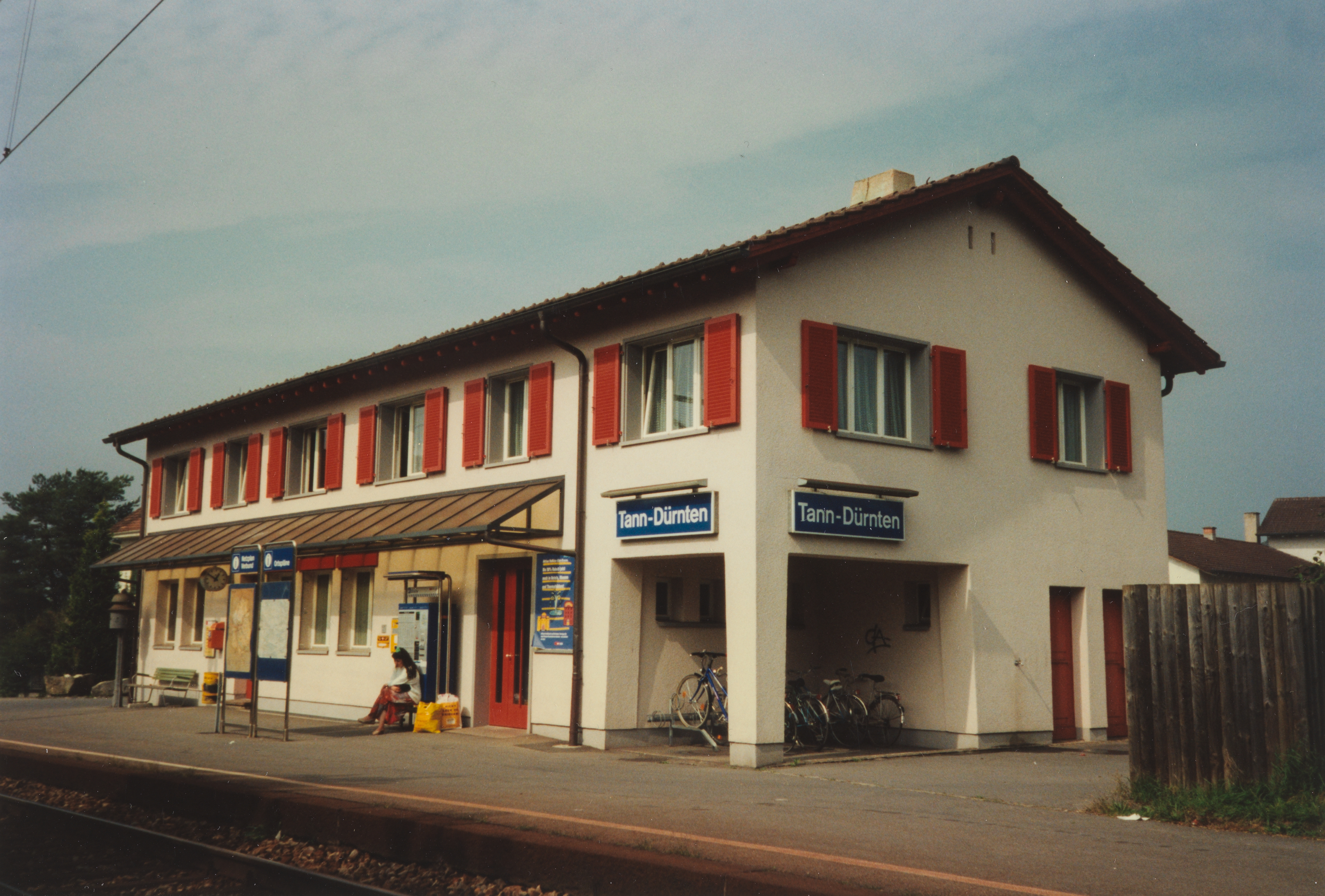
- Station building in 1994

General information
- Location: Alte Tannerstrasse; Tann; Dürnten, Zurich; Switzerland
- Coordinates: 47.268457°N 8.852596°E
- Elevation: 515 m (1,690 ft)
- Owner: Swiss Federal Railways
- Operator: Thurbo
- Line: Tösstalbahn
- Platforms: 2 side platforms
- Tracks: 2

Other information
- Fare zone: 134 (ZVV)

Services
Preceding station	Zurich S-Bahn	Following station
Wald towards Winterthur	S26	Rüti ZH Terminus
Location
- Location within Switzerland Location within Canton of Zurich

Tann-Dürnten railway station is a railway station in the Swiss canton of Zurich. The station is situated in the municipality of Dürnten and takes its name from the nearby village of Tann. It is located on the Tösstalbahn (lit. 'Töss Valley Railway') between Winterthur and Rüti ZH, within fare zone 134 of the Zürcher Verkehrsverbund (ZVV).

== Services ==
The station is served by Zurich S-Bahn line S26, which operates between Winterthur and Rüti, via Bauma.

- Zurich S-Bahn S26: half-hourly service between Winterthur and Rüti ZH

== See also ==
- Rail transport in Switzerland
