= Wald railway station =

Railway station in Canton of Zürich, Switzerland

Wald
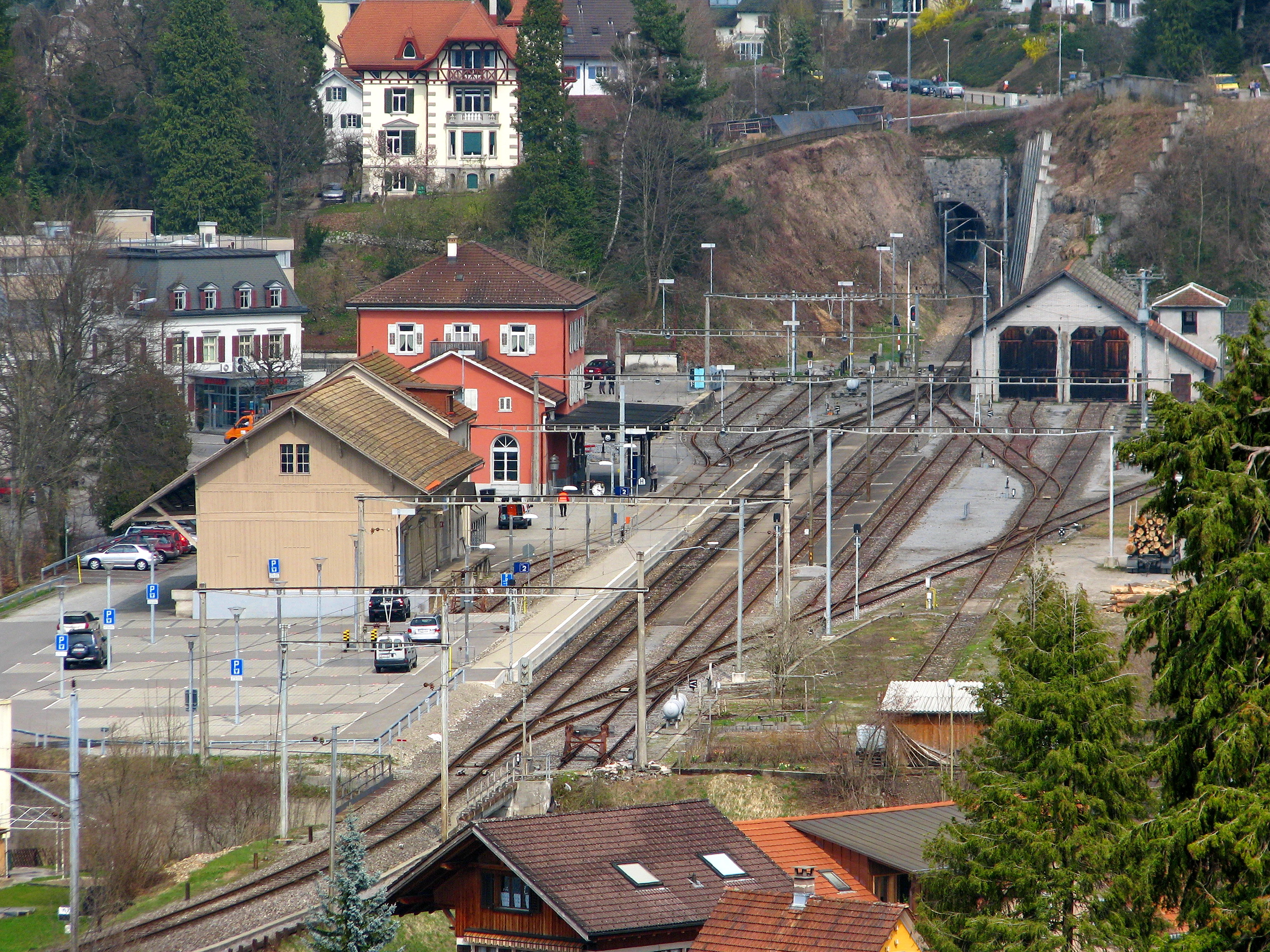

General information
- Location: Bahnhofstrasse, Wald, Canton of Zurich, Switzerland
- Coordinates: 47.272372°N 8.913871°E
- Elevation: 616 m (2,021 ft)
- Owner: Swiss Federal Railways
- Operator: Thurbo
- Line: Tösstalbahn
- Platforms: 1 side platform
- Tracks: 4
- Connections: Zurich Transport Network (ZVV)
- Bus: VZO bus routes 854 885 893; PostAuto bus route 892

Other information
- Fare zone: 134 (ZVV)

Services
Preceding station	Zurich S-Bahn	Following station
Gibswil towards Winterthur	S26	Tann-Dürnten towards Rüti ZH
Location
- Location within Switzerland Location within Canton of Zurich

Wald railway station is a railway station in the Swiss canton of Zürich, situated in the municipality of Wald (Jona Valley). The station is located on the Tösstalbahn (lit. 'Töss Valley Railway') between Winterthur and Rüti ZH, within fare zone 134 of the Zürcher Verkehrsverbund (ZVV).

== Services ==
=== Train ===
The station is served by Zurich S-Bahn line S26, which operates between Winterthur and Rüti, via Bauma.

- Zurich S-Bahn S26: half-hourly service between Winterthur and Rüti ZH

=== Bus ===
The station is also served by bus routes of the Verkehrsbetriebe Zürichsee und Oberland (VZO), and of the Swiss PostBus service (PostAuto), which depart adjacent to the station building.

== See also ==
- Rail transport in Switzerland
