= Wald (surname) =

Wald is a German surname meaning "forest". Notable people with the surname include:

- Abraham Wald (1902–1950), Hungarian mathematician of German descent
- Carol Wald (1935–2000), American artist
- Charles F. Wald (born 1948), American military officer
- Daniel Wald (born 1982), German politician
- David Wald, American voice actor
- David J. Wald (born 1962), American seismologist
- Diane Wald, American poet
- Eduard Wald (1905–1978), German Resistance member, politician, unionist
- Elijah Wald (born 1959), American folk blues guitarist and music historian
- Florence Wald (1917–2008), "mother of the American hospice movement"
- František Wald (1861–1931), German-Czech chemist
- George Wald (1906–1997), American biologist and Nobel Laureate
- Jerry Wald (1916–1962), American film producer and screenwriter
- Karl Wald (1916–2011), German football referee
- Lillian Wald (1867–1940), American nurse and social worker
- Michael S. Wald, American lawyer currently the Jackson Eli Reynolds Professor of Law, Emeritus at Stanford Law School.
- Nicholas Wald (born 1944), British professor, Fellow of the Royal Society
- Orli Wald (1914–1962), German Resistance member, concentration camp survivor, "Angel of Auschwitz"
- Patricia Wald (1928–2019), American judge
- Robert Wald (born 1947), American physicist
- Warren Wald (born 1980), English Pop Idol contestant
