= Walde =

Walde is a surname. Notable people with the surname include:

- Alfons Walde (1891–1958), Austrian painter
- Alois Walde (1869–1924), German linguist
- Arve Walde (born 1985), Norwegian footballer
- Werner Walde (born 1926), German politician (DDR)

== See also ==
- Walde, a hamlet in the municipality of St. Gallenkappel, Switzerland
- Wald (disambiguation)
