= František Wald =

Czech professor of chemistry

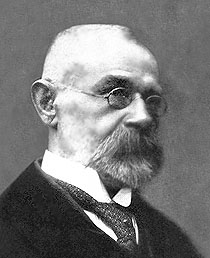

František "Franz" Wald (9 January 1861 – 19 October 1931) was a Czech professor of chemistry who contributed to metallurgy, analytical and physical chemistry. He questioned atomic and molecular approaches to understanding chemical phenomena.

Wald was born at Brandýsek, near Slaný, where his father, originally from Chemnitz, Germany, was a foreman of a workshop of the Austrian Railways. His mother was from Karlsbad. Wald went to school at Kladno and received a grant from the Austrian State Railways to study at Prague. Although German adopted a Czech nationality. He worked at the laboratory of Pražská železářská společnost, the main ironworks in Kladno. He became a chief chemist in 1886. In 1908 he became a professor at the Czech Technical University, Prague.

Wald examined chemical phenomena using the laws of thermodynamics, rather than examine them through ideas from atomic theory. He wrote on this in his Die Energie und ihre Entwertung (1888). His second book Chemie fází (Prague, 1918) examined his idea of phase as a fundamental concept rather than atoms.
