= Wald, Zürich =

Wald
- Municipality
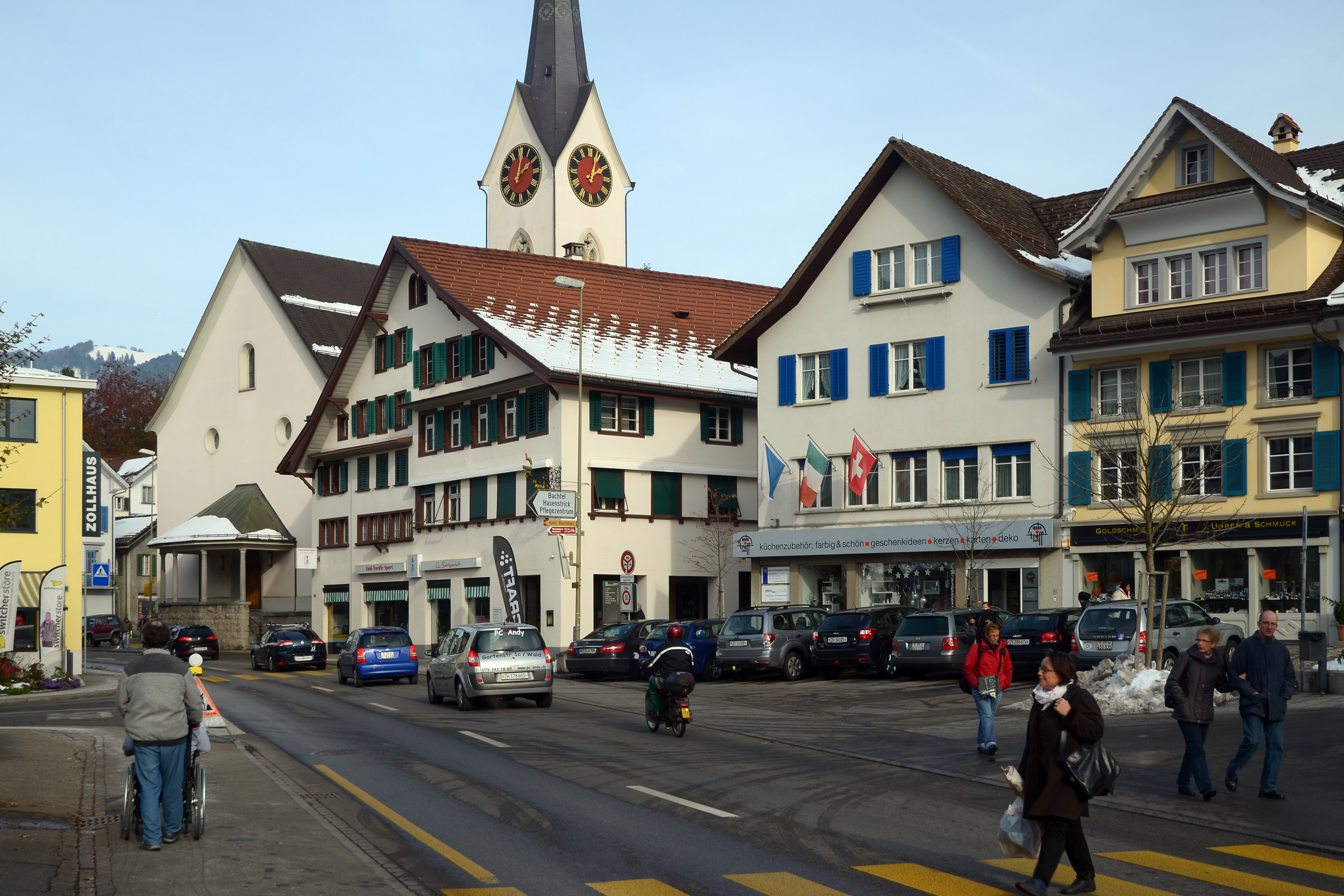

- Flag Coat of arms
- Location of Wald
- Location within Switzerland Location within Canton of Zürich
- Coordinates: 47°17′N 8°55′E
- Country: Switzerland
- Canton: Zürich
- District: Hinwil

Area
  - Total: 25.25 km^{2} (9.75 sq mi)
- Elevation: 763 m (2,503 ft)

Population (December 2020)
  - Total: 10,200
  - Density: 404/km^{2} (1,050/sq mi)
- Time zone: UTC+01:00 (CET)
  - Summer (DST): UTC+02:00 (CEST)
- Postal code: 8636
- SFOS number: 120
- ISO 3166 code: CH-ZH
- Surrounded by: Dürnten, Eschenbach (SG), Fischenthal, Goldingen (SG), Hinwil, Rüti
- Website: www.wald.zh.ch

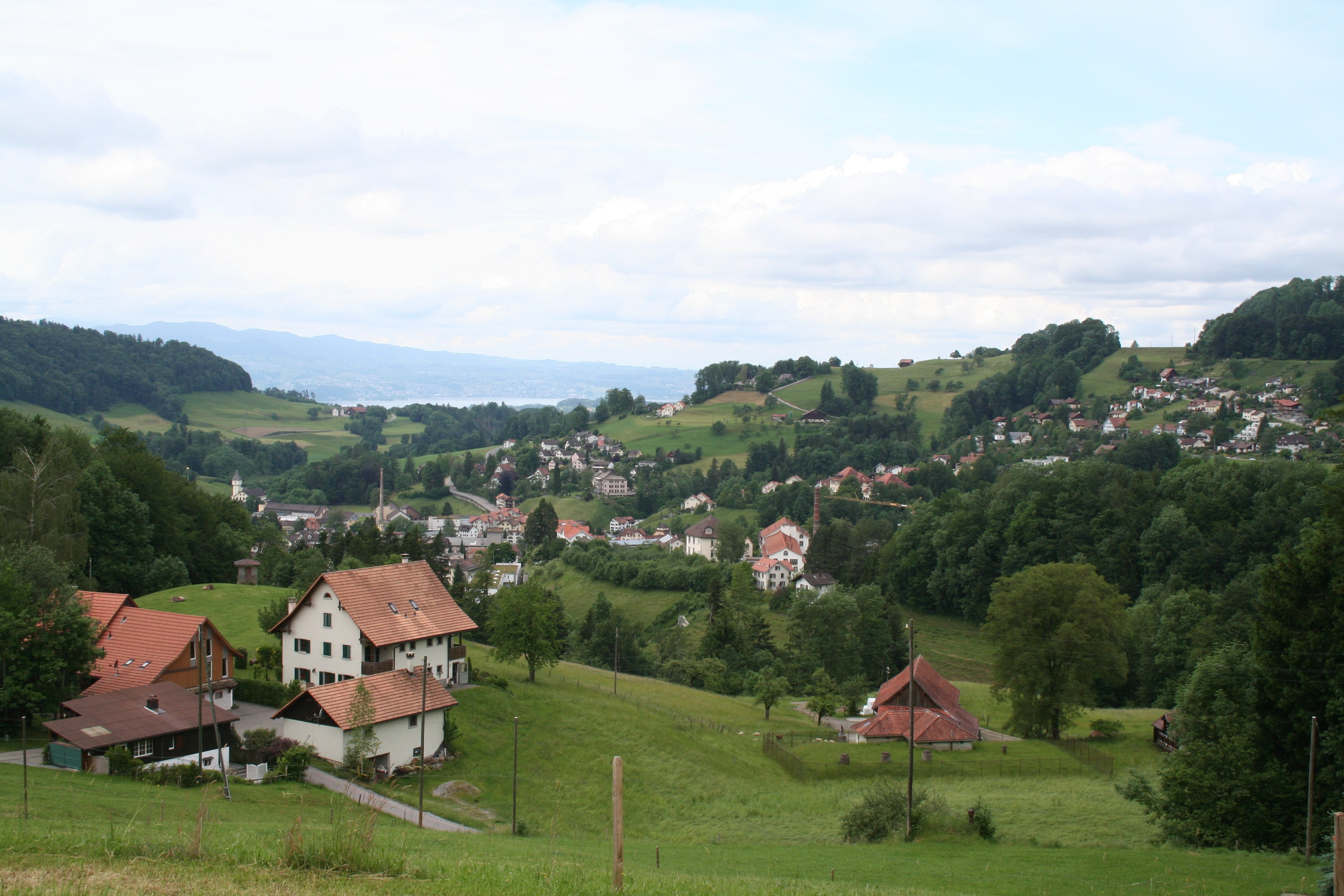
Wald, as seen from the upper Töss Valley

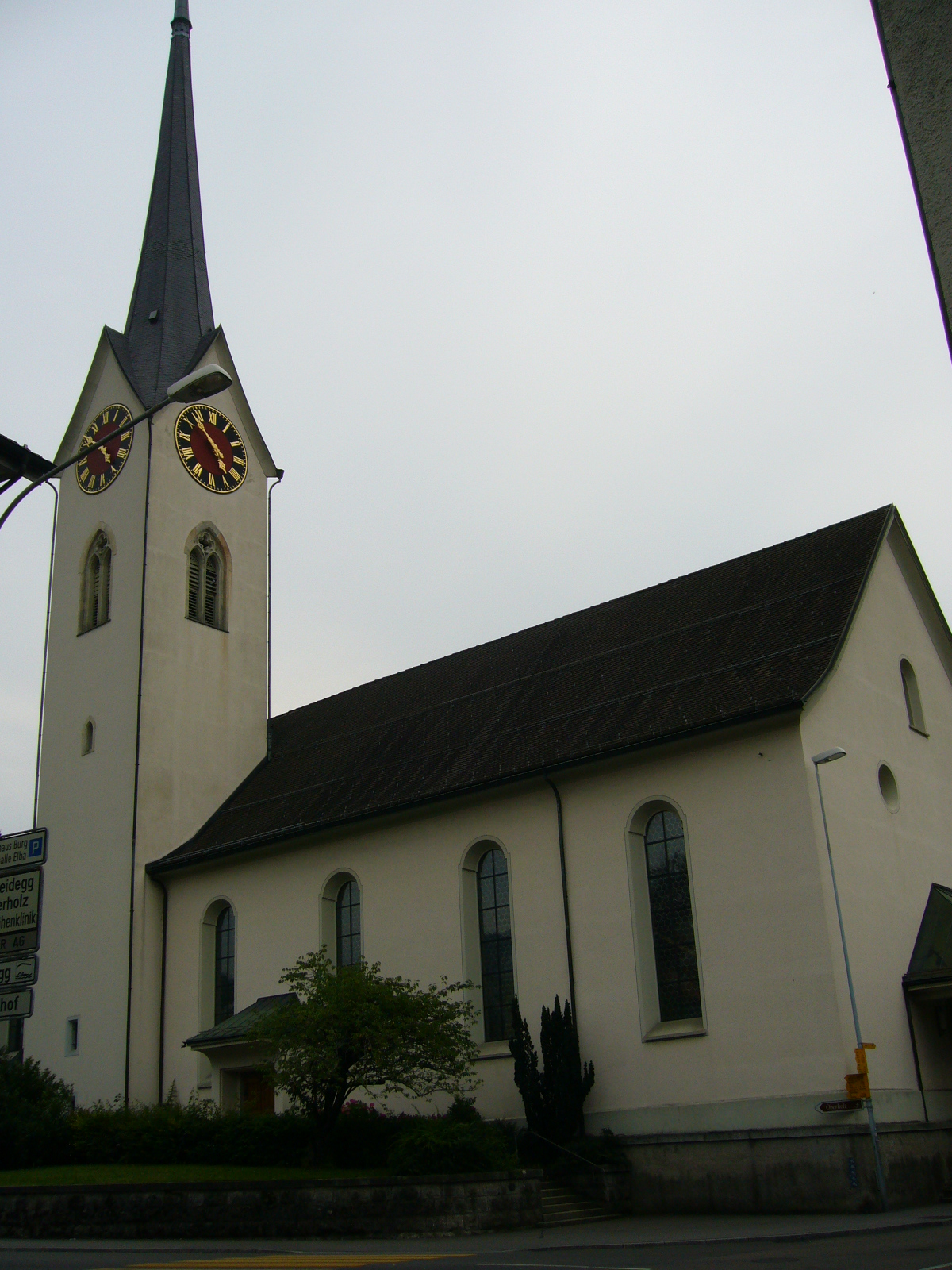
The Dorfkirche (Protestant church) in Wald

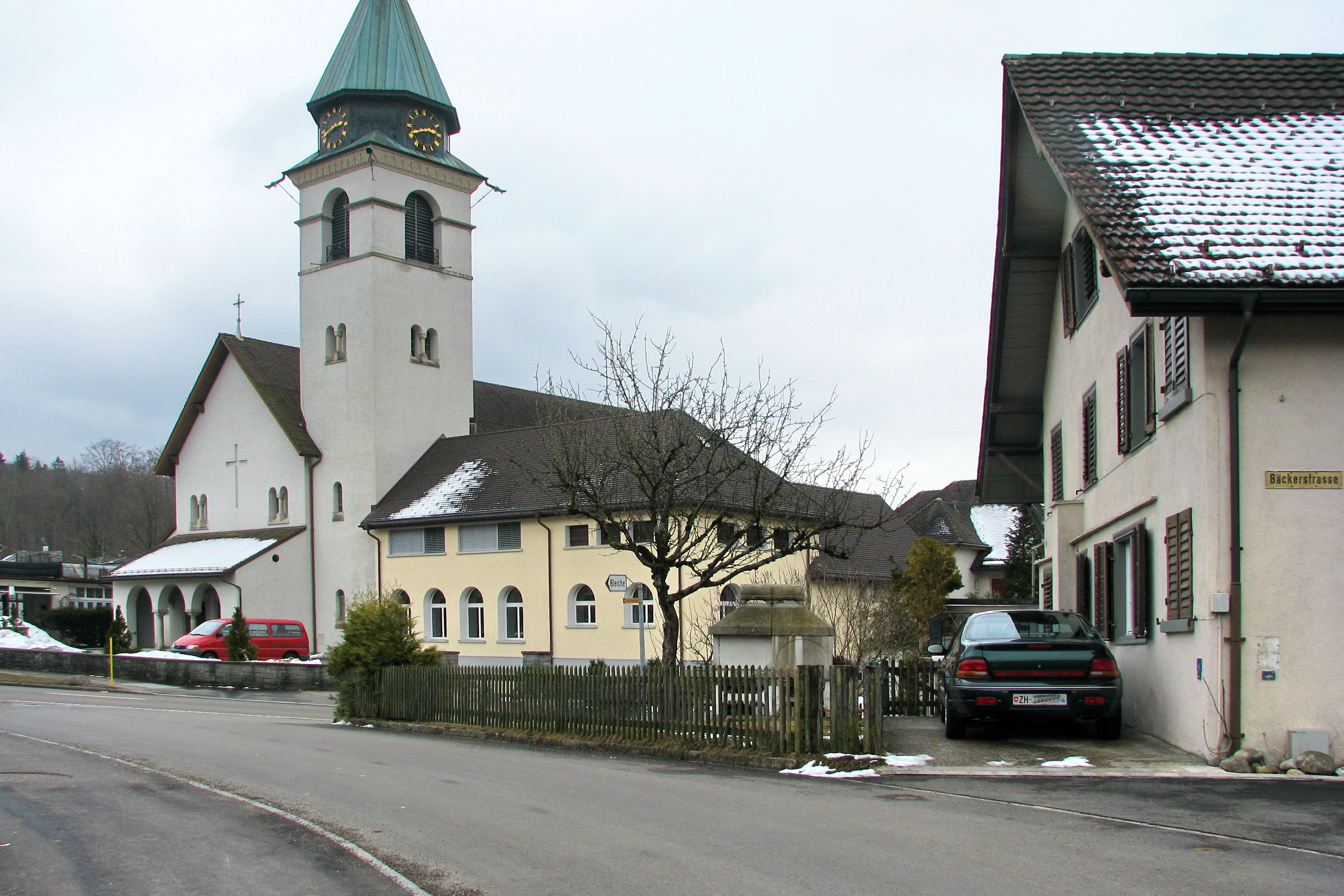
The Roman Catholic Church

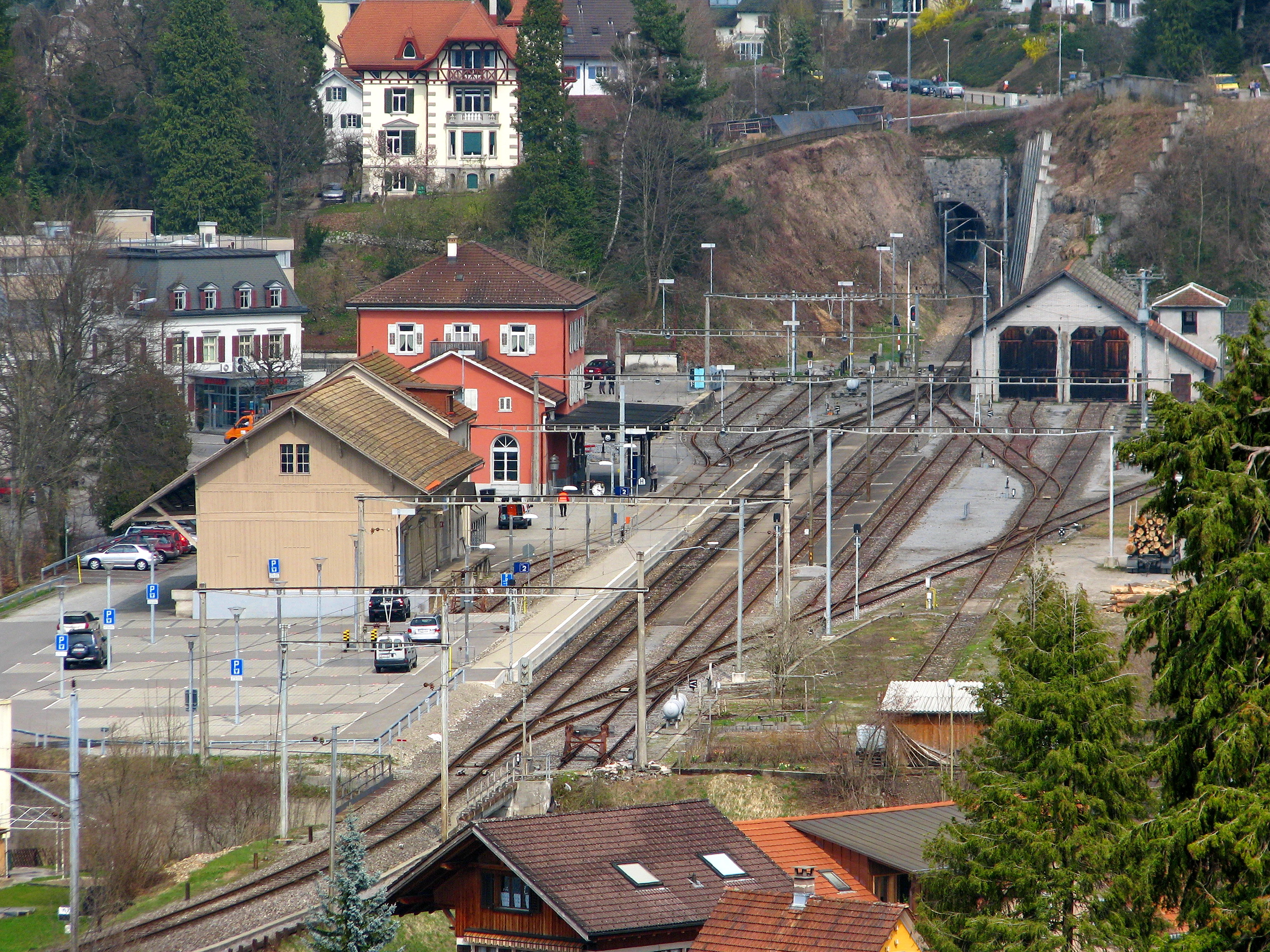
Wald railway station

Wald (German pronunciation: [valt]) is a village and a municipality in the district of Hinwil in the canton of Zürich in Switzerland.

== History ==
Aerial view (1948)

Wald is mentioned for the first time in a document from 1217. In the year 1621 the municipality received market rights.

Around 1820, the village of Wald, referred to as Dorfschaft or Marktflecken, consisted of about 60 to 70 houses. Industrialisation in the 19th century turned Wald into an important business location with numerous spinning and weaving mills.

Wald was the first rural municipality in the canton of Zurich to introduce weapons training for secondary school pupils in 1851. This tradition survived in customs in the form of "boys' parades" (Umezug) with muzzle-loading shooting at carnival time.

At the turn of the 19th and 20th centuries, there were 16 factories in Wald, all of which made their money from textiles. At this time, Wald was also known as the "Manchester of the Canton of Zurich". In the 1860s, the Oberholzer family of factory owners promoted social welfare by establishing workers' housing and day nurseries. Mechanised industry originally owed its development in the pioneering days to the topographical conditions. Water-rich streams and rivers flow through the municipality and their water power was utilised from the middle of the 19th century: Mechanical spinning mills were the first to set up along Wald's waterways. With the construction of reservoirs, electricity could soon be produced and utilised. A large number of weaving mills were established, making Wald the textile metropolis of the Zurich Oberland.

== Geography ==
Wald has an area of 25.2 km^{2} (9.7 sq mi). Of this area, 53.9% is used for agricultural purposes, while 33.4% is forested. Of the rest of the land, 12% is settled (buildings or roads) and the remainder (0.8%) is non-productive (rivers, glaciers or mountains). In 1996 housing and buildings made up 8% of the total area, while transportation infrastructure made up the rest (4.1%). Of the total unproductive area, water (streams and lakes) made up 0.2% of the area. As of 2007 8.6% of the total municipal area was undergoing some type of construction.

== Demographics ==
Wald has a population (as of 31 December 2020) of 10,200. As of 2007, 23.5% of the population was made up of foreign nationals. As of 2008 the gender distribution of the population was 50% male and 50% female. Over the last 10 years the population has grown at a rate of 6.9%. Most of the population (as of 2000) speaks German (83.9%), with Italian being second most common ( 5.2%) and Serbo-Croatian being third ( 2.8%).

In the 2007 election the most popular party was the SVP which received 41.5% of the vote. The next three most popular parties were the SPS (15.3%), the Green Party (11.3%) and the FDP (9.7%).

The age distribution of the population (as of 2000) is children and teenagers (0–19 years old) make up 26.2% of the population, while adults (20–64 years old) make up 57.6% and seniors (over 64 years old) make up 16.2%. In Wald about 65.2% of the population (between age 25-64) have completed either non-mandatory upper secondary education or additional higher education (either university or a Fachhochschule). There are 3369 households in Wald.

Wald has an unemployment rate of 2.46%. As of 2005, there were 235 people employed in the primary economic sector and about 98 businesses involved in this sector. 959 people are employed in the secondary sector and there are 113 businesses in this sector. 1806 people are employed in the tertiary sector, with 269 businesses in this sector. As of 2007 45.5% of the working population were employed full-time, and 54.5% were employed part-time.

As of 2008 there were 2779 Catholics and 3377 Protestants in Wald. In the 2000 census, religion was broken down into several smaller categories. From the 2000 census, 43.9% were some type of Protestant, with 41.2% belonging to the Swiss Reformed Church and 2.7% belonging to other Protestant churches. 32.6% of the population were Catholic. Of the rest of the population, 0% were Muslim, 10.5% belonged to another religion (not listed), 4.2% did not give a religion, and 8.4% were atheist or agnostic.

== Transportation ==
Wald railway station is a stop of the Zürich S-Bahn on the lines S26.

== Gallery ==
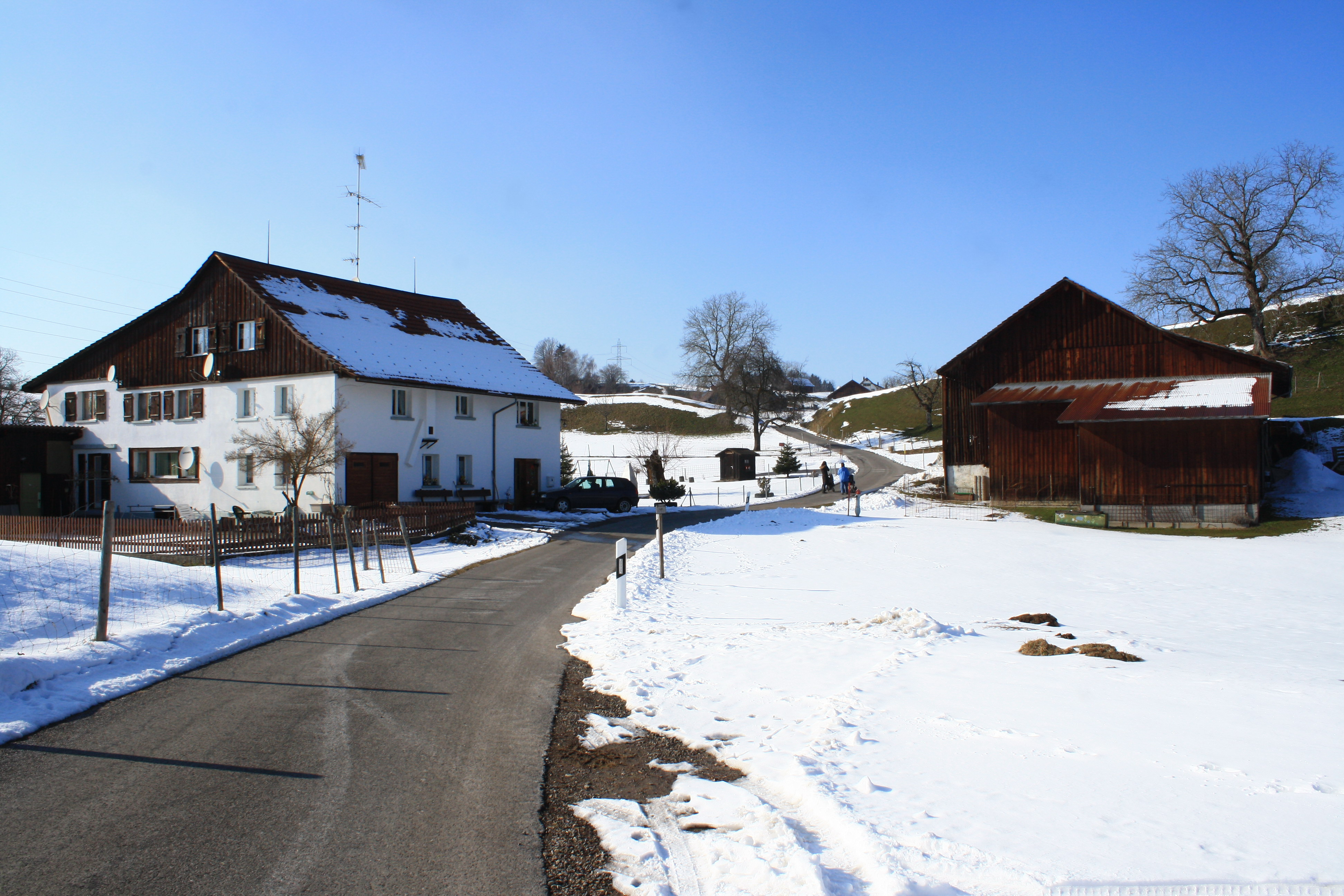
Güntisberg

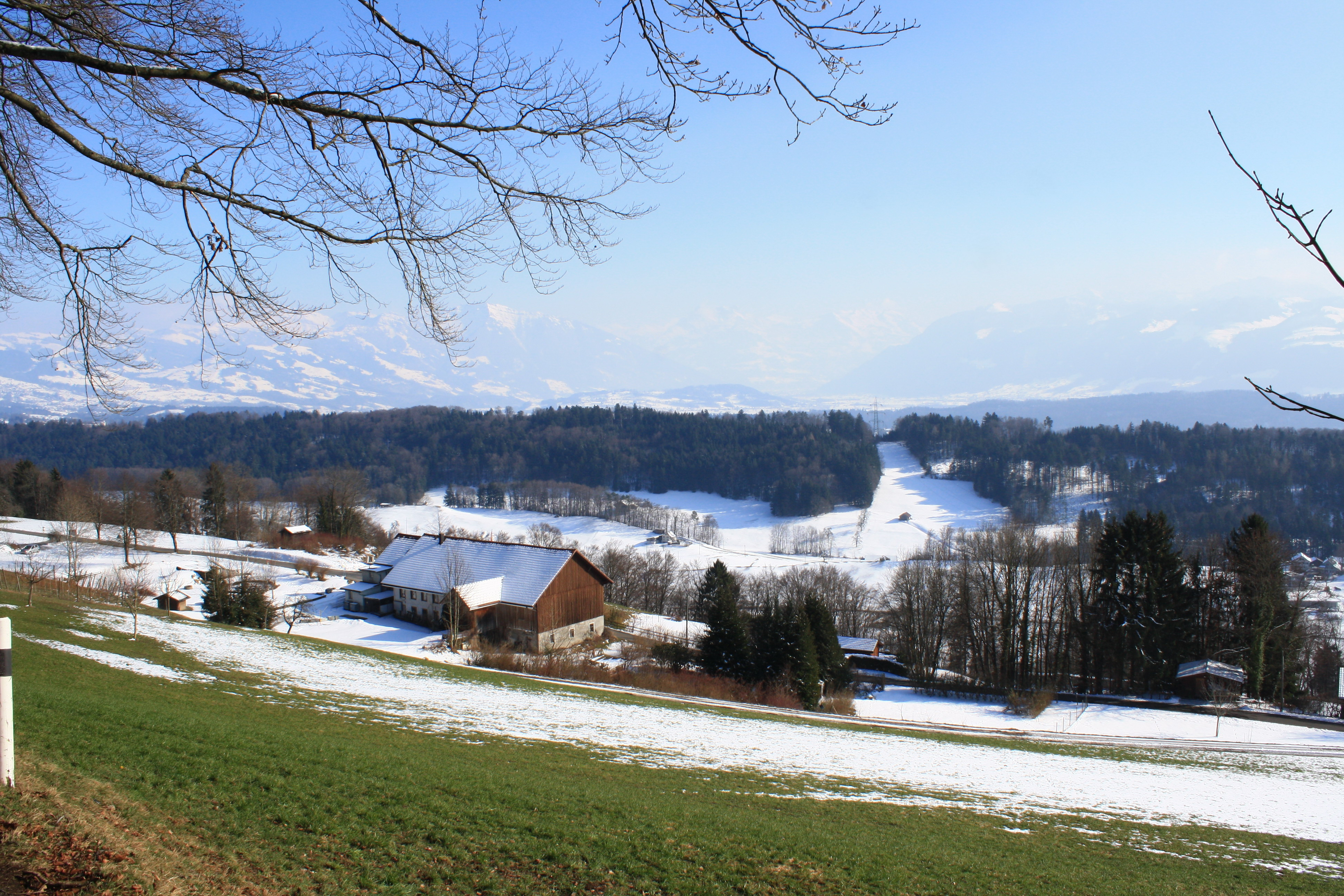
Hiltisberg

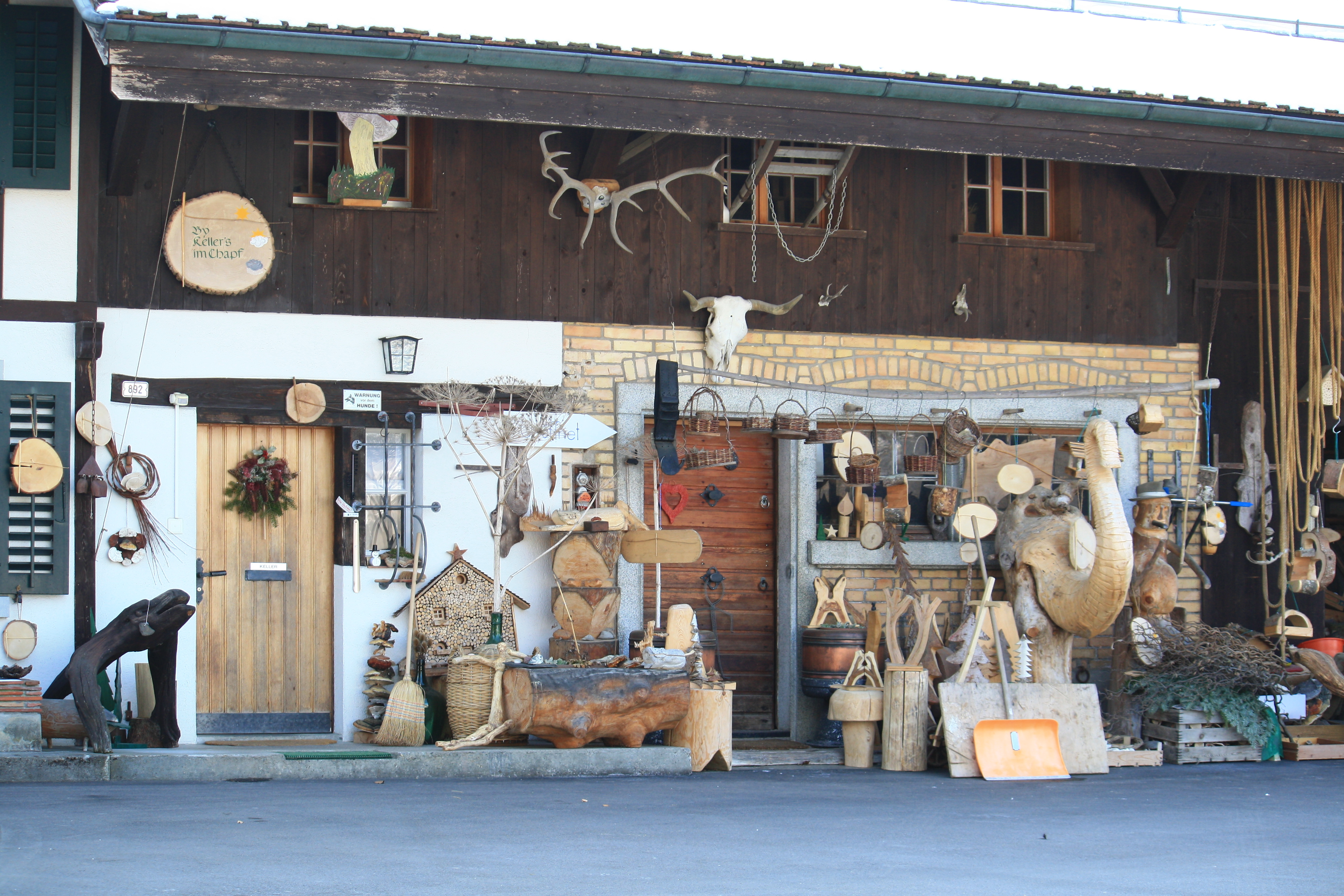
Unterer Chapf towards Hiltisberg

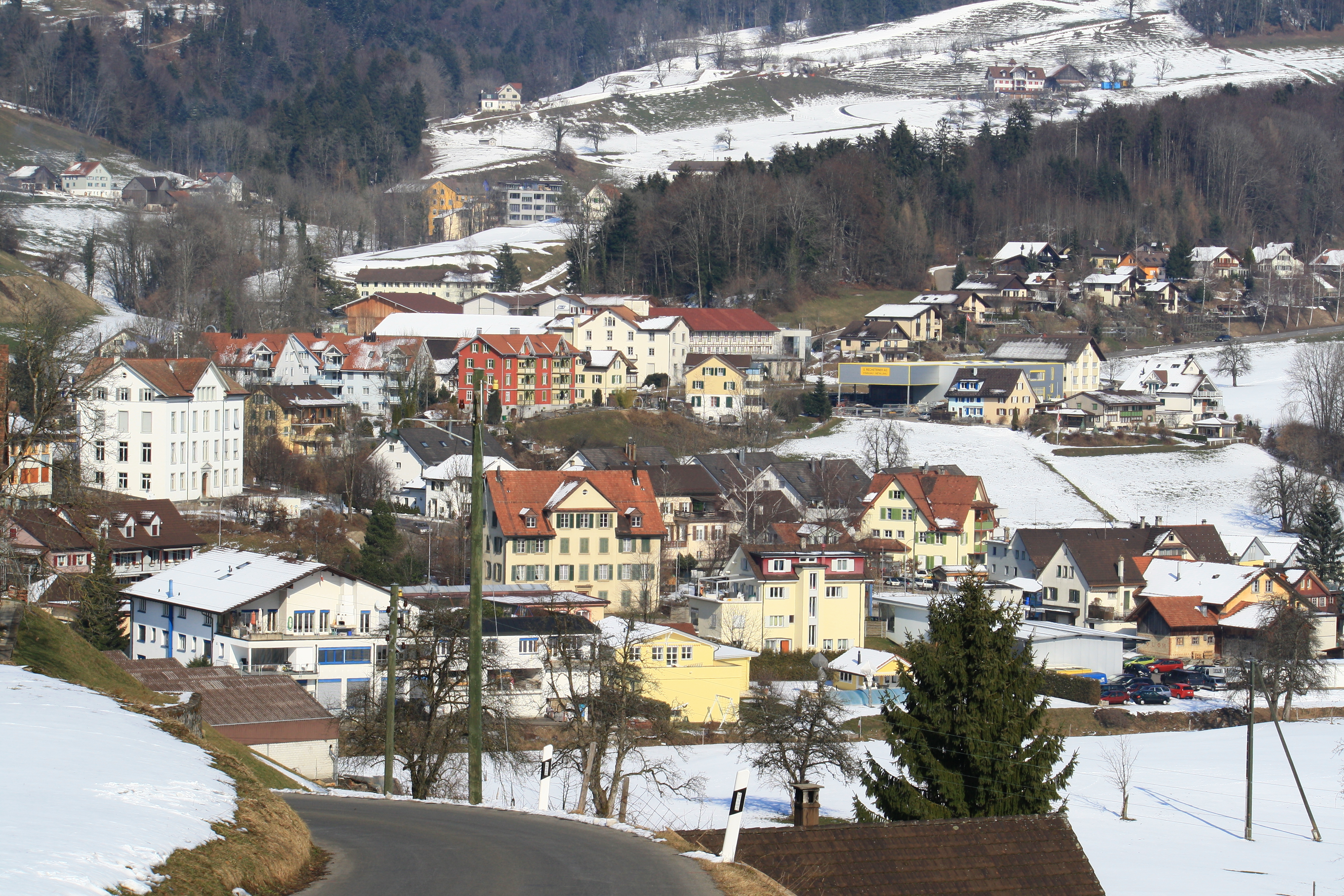
Laupen

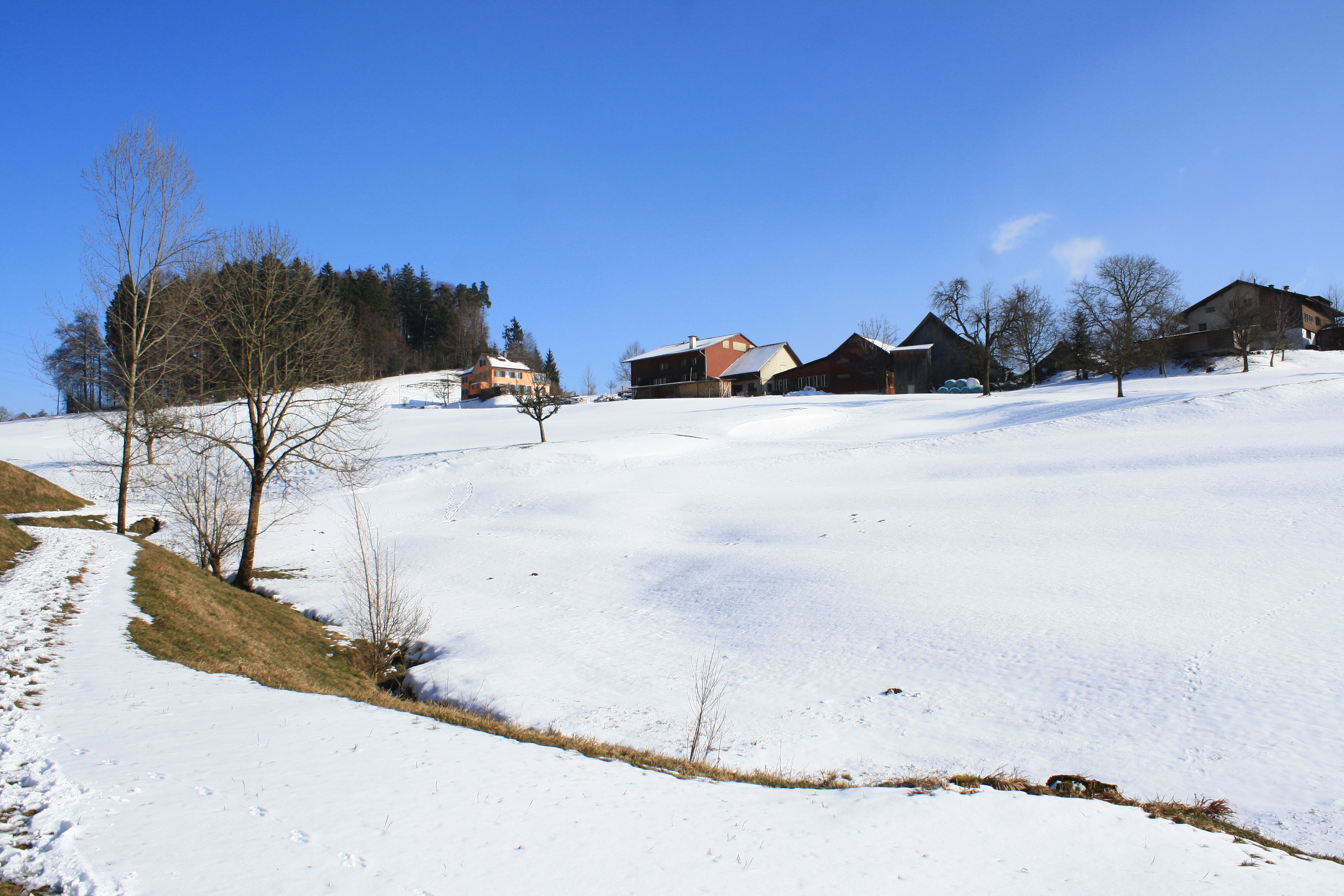
Mettlen

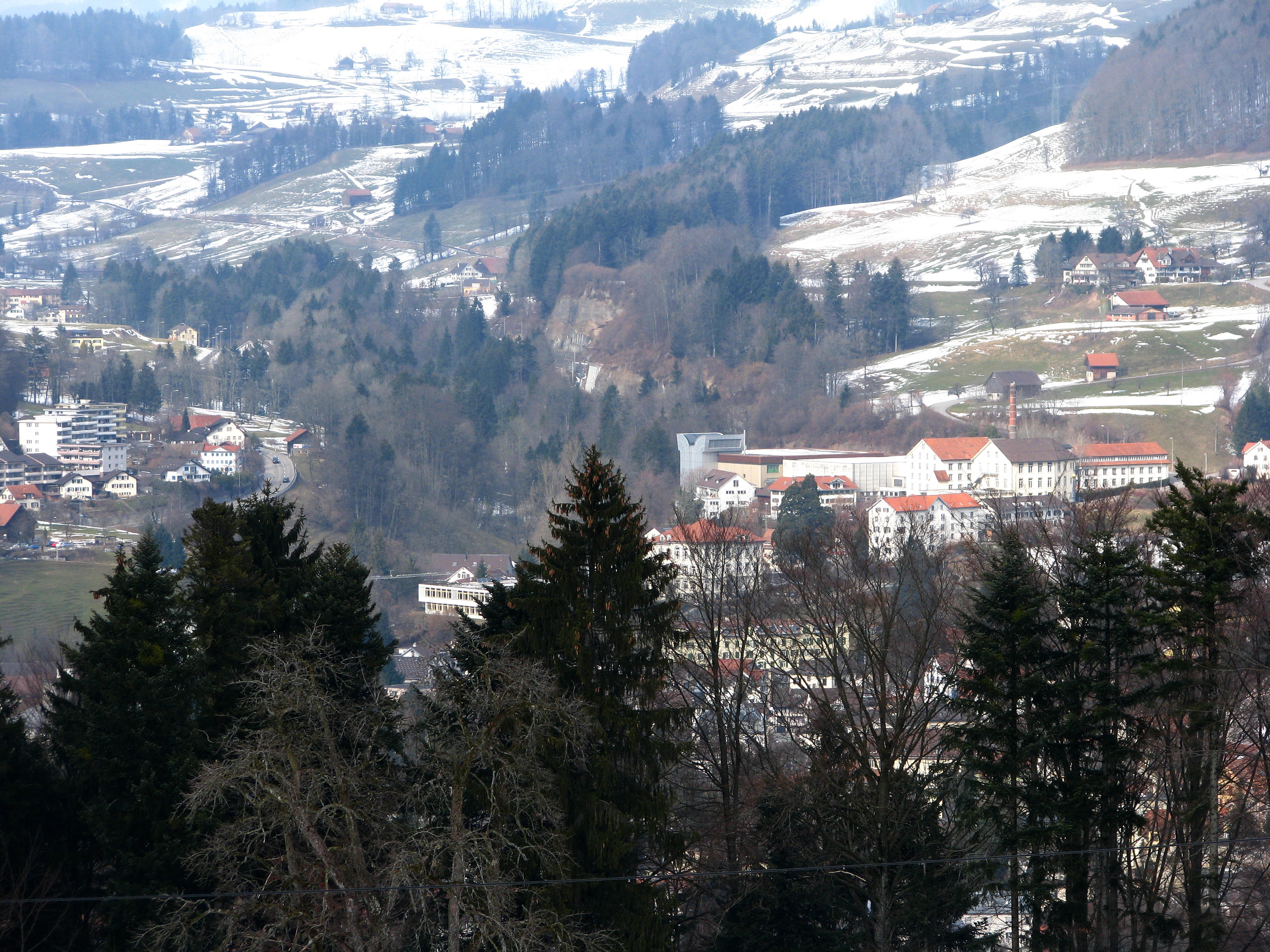
Jonatal i.e. Jona (river) valley

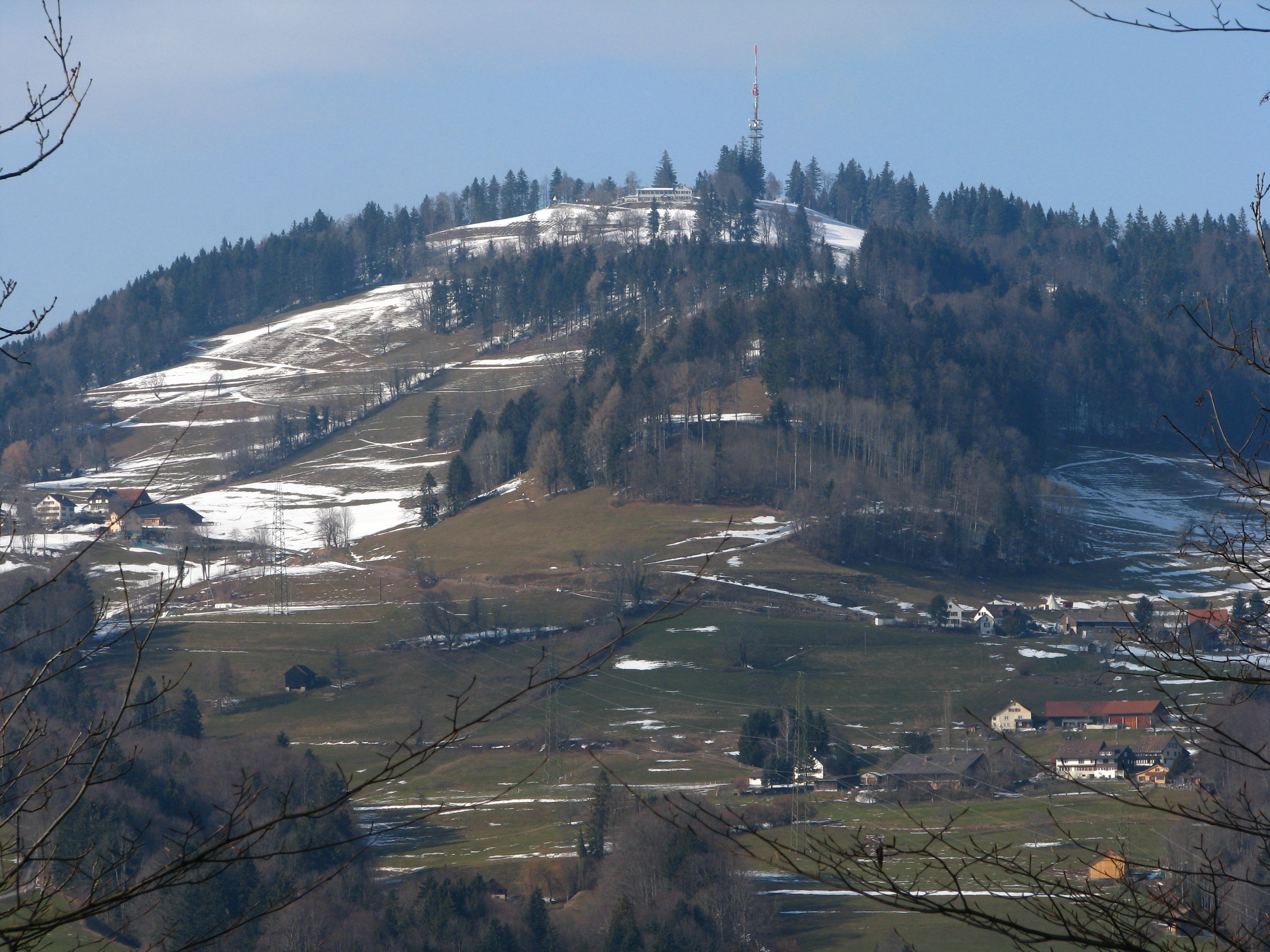
Bachtel as seen from Batzberg
