= Tösstal railway line =

Railway service in Switzerland

Tösstal railway line (S26)
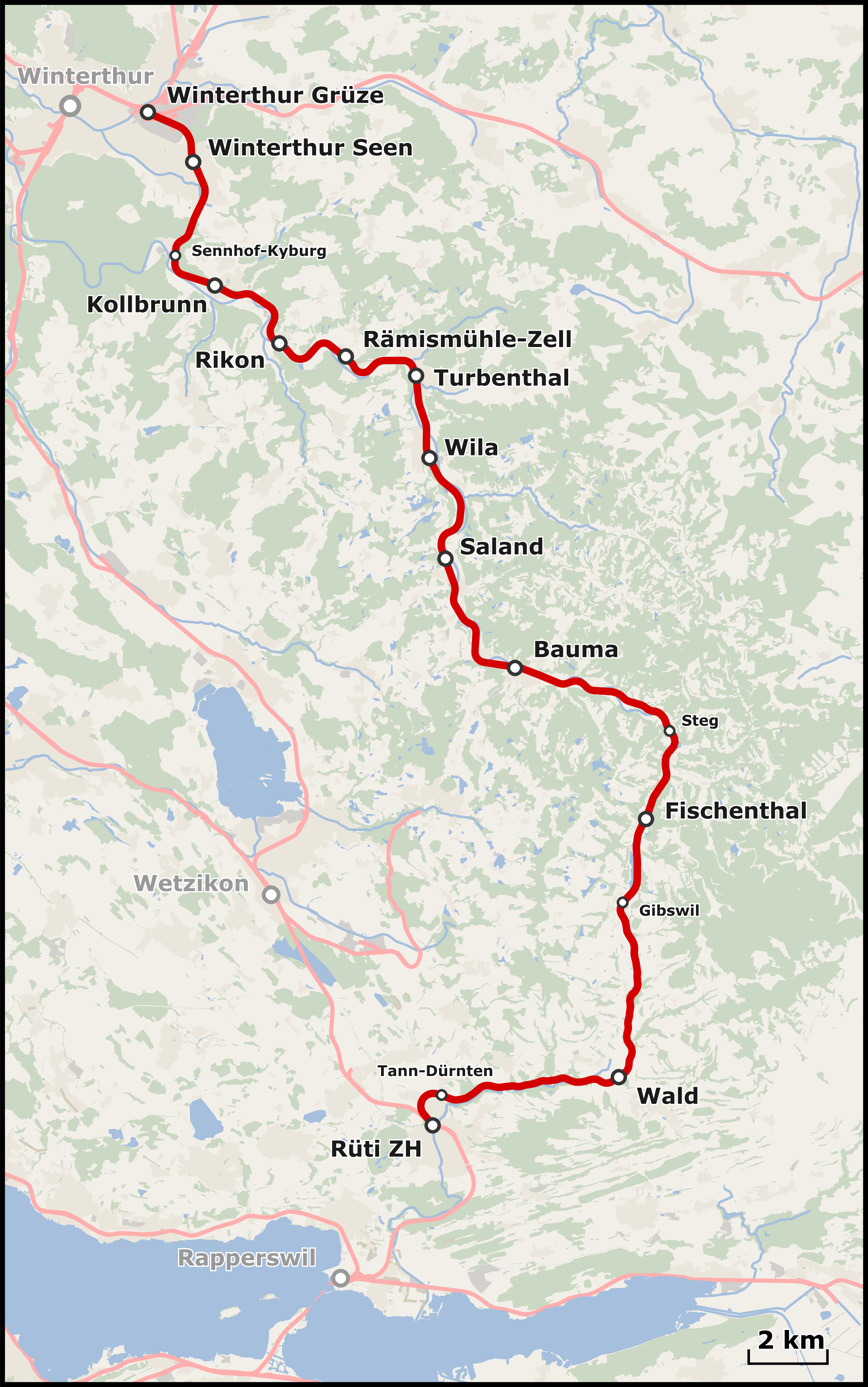

Overview
- Status: Operational
- Owner: Swiss Federal Railways
- Locale: Canton of Zurich, Switzerland
- Termini: Winterthur; Rüti ZH
- Stations: 17
- Website: ZVV (in English)

Service
- Type: Heavy rail
- System: Zurich S-Bahn
- Operator(s): Thurbo
- Rolling stock: Stadler GTW (most trains)

Technical
- Track gauge: 1,435 mm (4 ft 8 1/2 in) standard gauge

The Tösstal railway line (Töss Valley Railway, German: Tösstalbahn or TTB) is a railway in the Swiss canton of Zurich, which serves the communities of the upper Töss Valley and the upper Jona Valley. Passenger service on the line now forms part of the Zurich S-Bahn, branded as the S26, and the standard Zürcher Verkehrsverbund (ZVV) zonal fare tariffs apply to the line. It is one of the network's less-heavily traveled lines, and most of the route is single-tracked.

== History ==
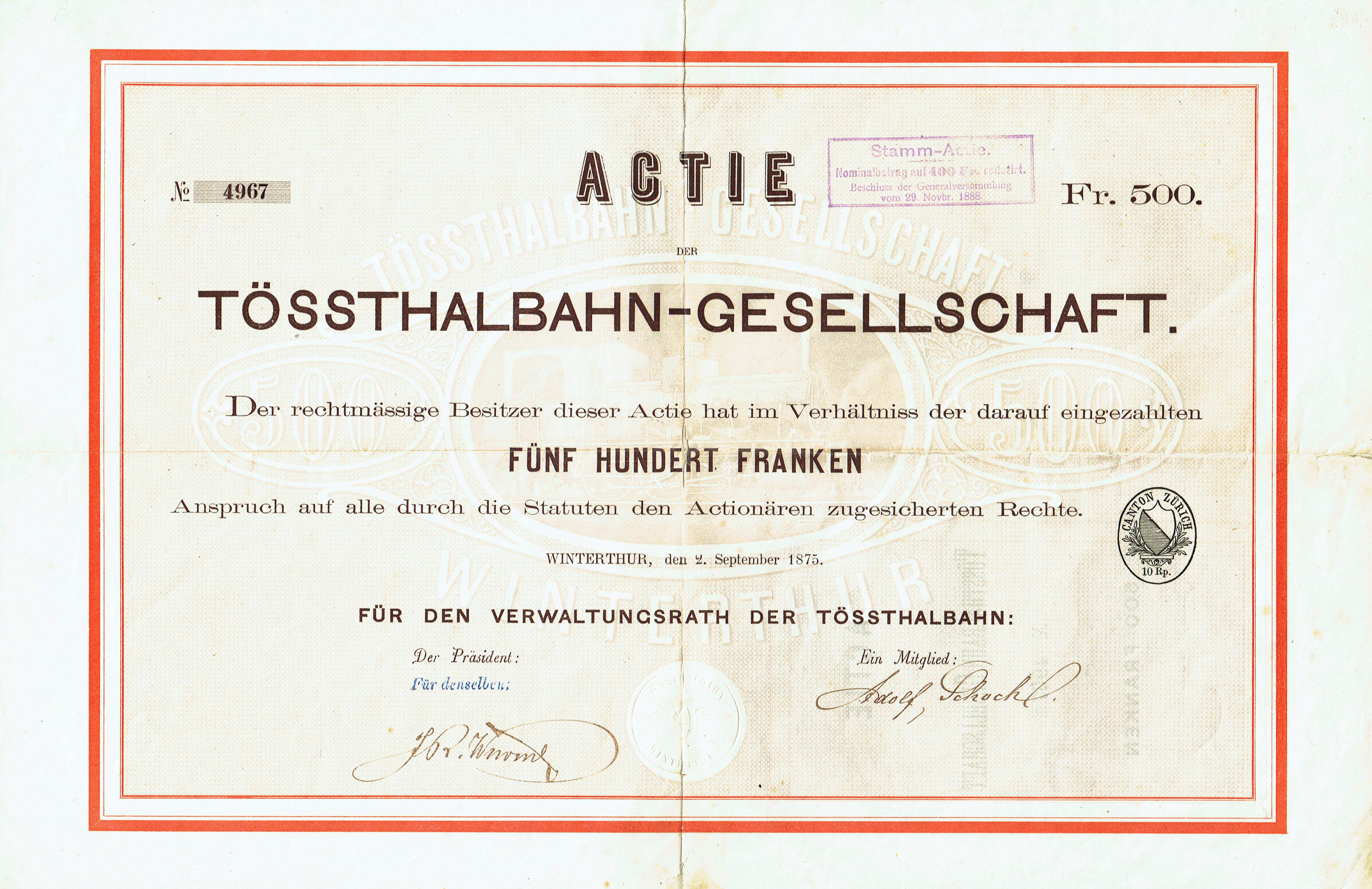
Share of the Tössthalbahn-Gesellschaft, issued 2. September 1875

The Tösstalbahn (TTB) opened between Winterthur Grüze and Bauma was on 4 May 1875, and its continuation to Wald opened on 15 October 1876. At Wald the line connected with the independently owned Wald-Rüti-Bahn (WR) from Rüti ZH, which had itself opened on 29 September 1876. The two lines remained in separate ownership until they both became part of the Swiss Federal Railways (SBB) on 10 June 1918, although the TTB had operated the WB from 1902.

In 1901, the Uerikon-Bauma-Bahn (UeBB) opened, providing a third access point to the Tösstal line at Bauma. This line was never a great success, and in 1948 much of it was abandoned, but the stretch from Hinwil to Bauma was acquired by the SBB, retained and electrified. However passenger services ceased by 1979, and the Hinwil to Bauma section is now operated as a preserved railway by the Dampfbahn-Verein Zürcher Oberland (DVZO).

In 1990, the passenger service on the Tösstalbahn became part of the Zurich S-Bahn network. Operation remained the responsibility of the SBB, with service provided using RBDe 560, with occasional RBe 540 supplements. Einheitswagen ("standard coaches") I or II as well as a BDt or Bt control car made up the rest of the consist, all of which were generally in the NPZ (blue over white) livery.

In December 2006, Thurbo, a regional railway partly owned by the SBB, took over the operation of the S26 passenger service and provided new rolling stock. The line remains in the ownership of the SBB.

Since December 2018, the S11 service has been operating on a section of the Tösstalbahn. During rush hours, the upgrades that have taken effect enable the S-Bahn to run an hourly service to Wila. In 2019, the continuous half-hourly interval of the S26 between Winterthur and Rüti ZH has been introduced.

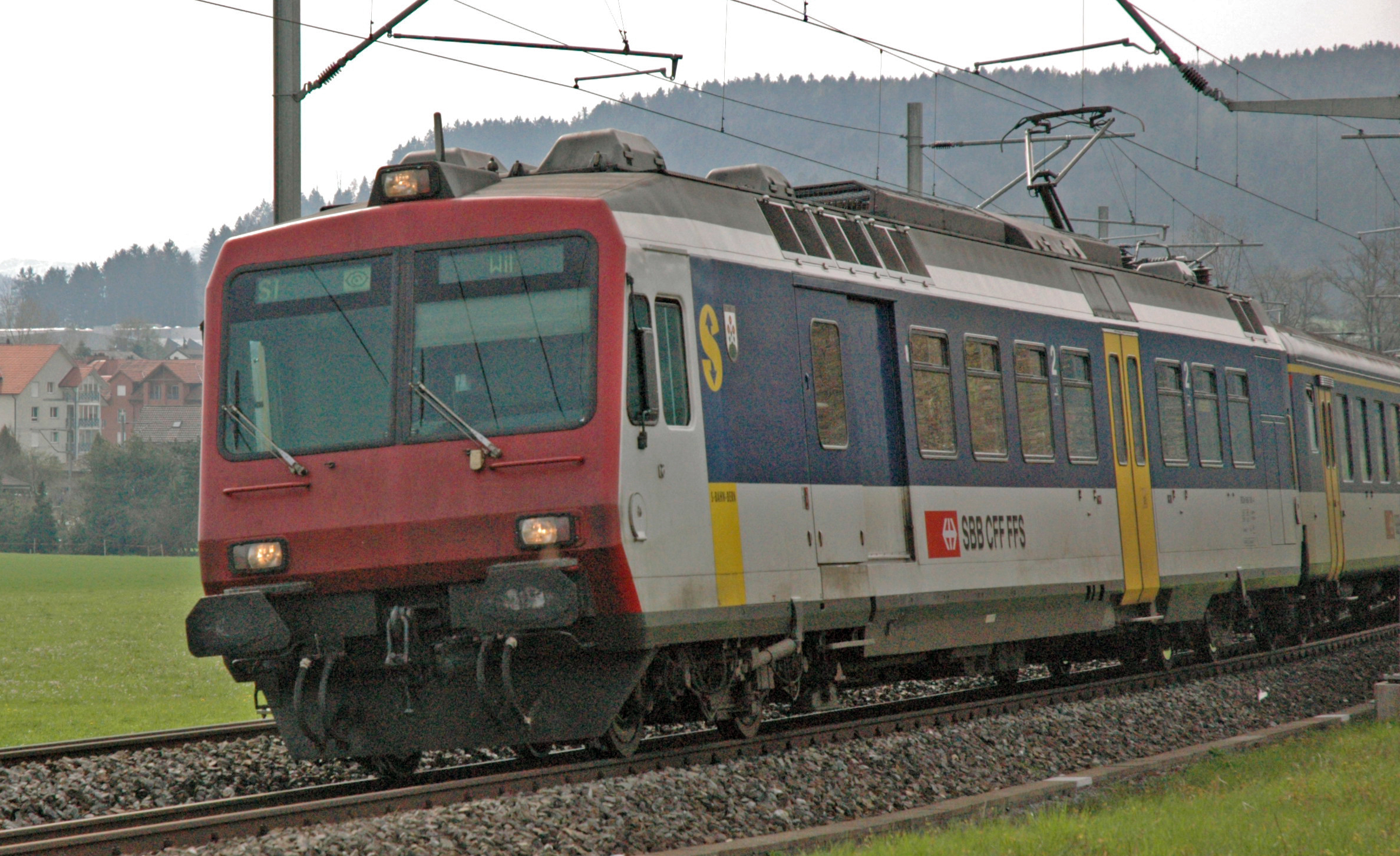
Typical S26 equipment in 2006 - the SBB-CFF-FFS RBDe 560

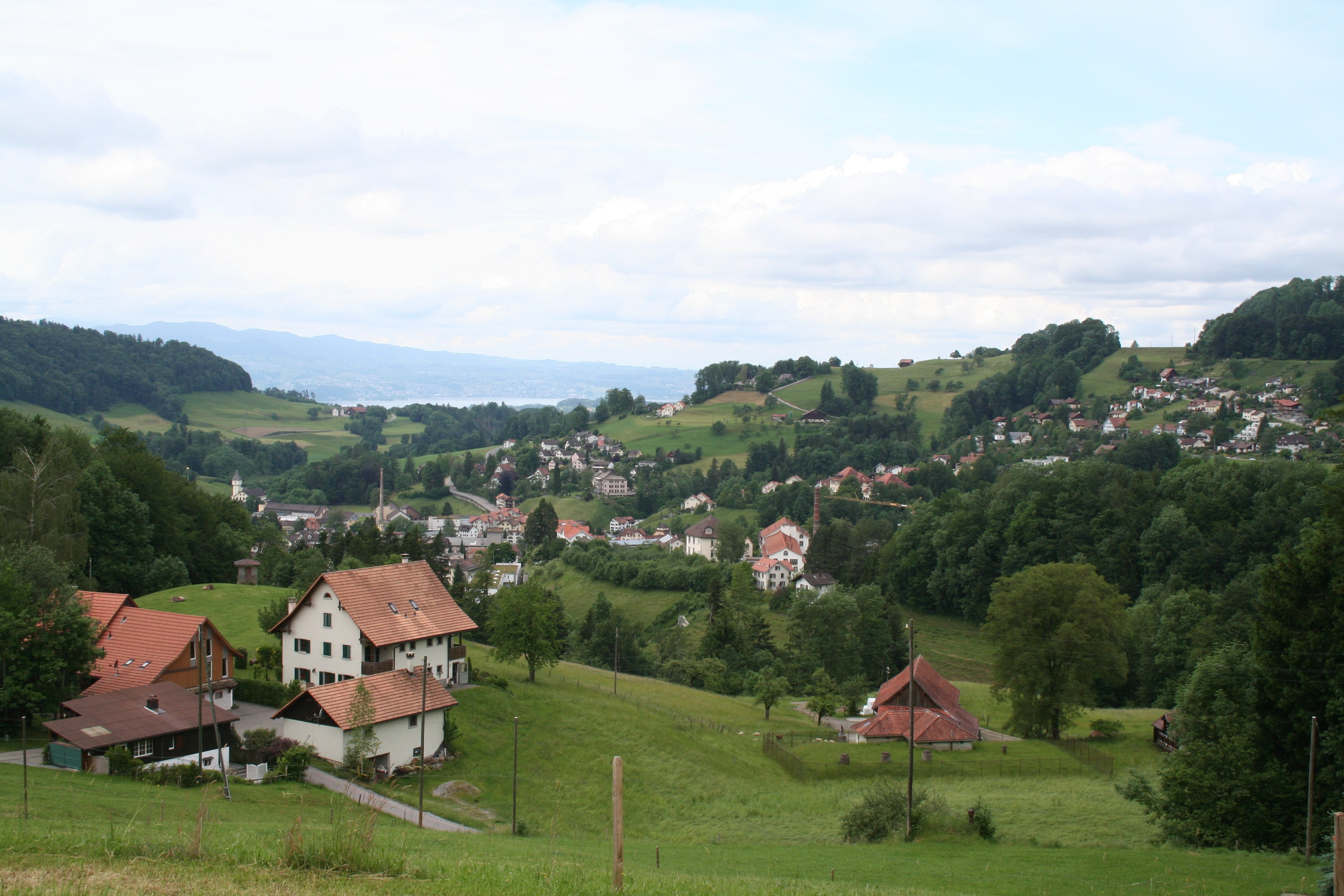
Tösstal near Wald.

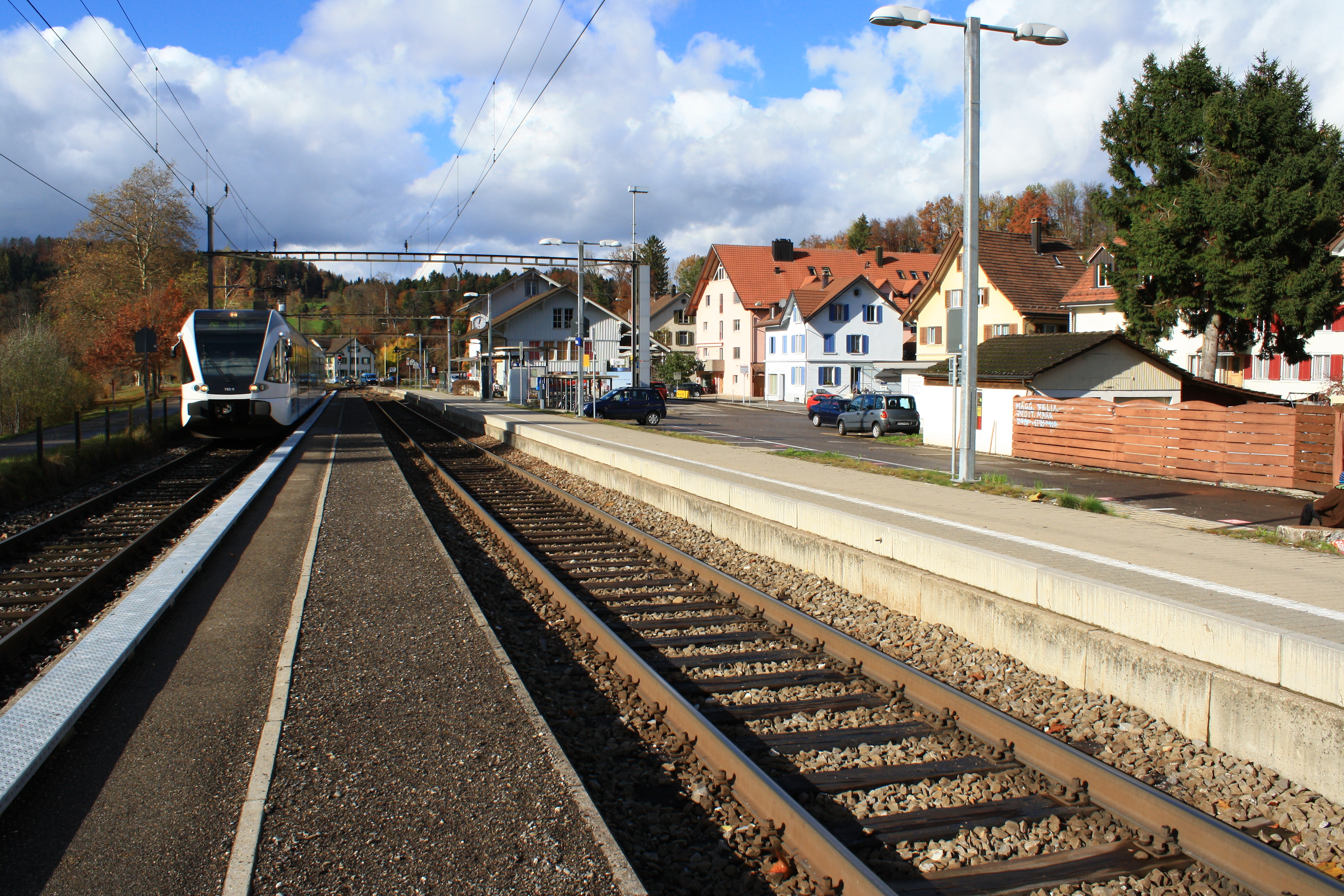
Stadler GTW train at Rikon.

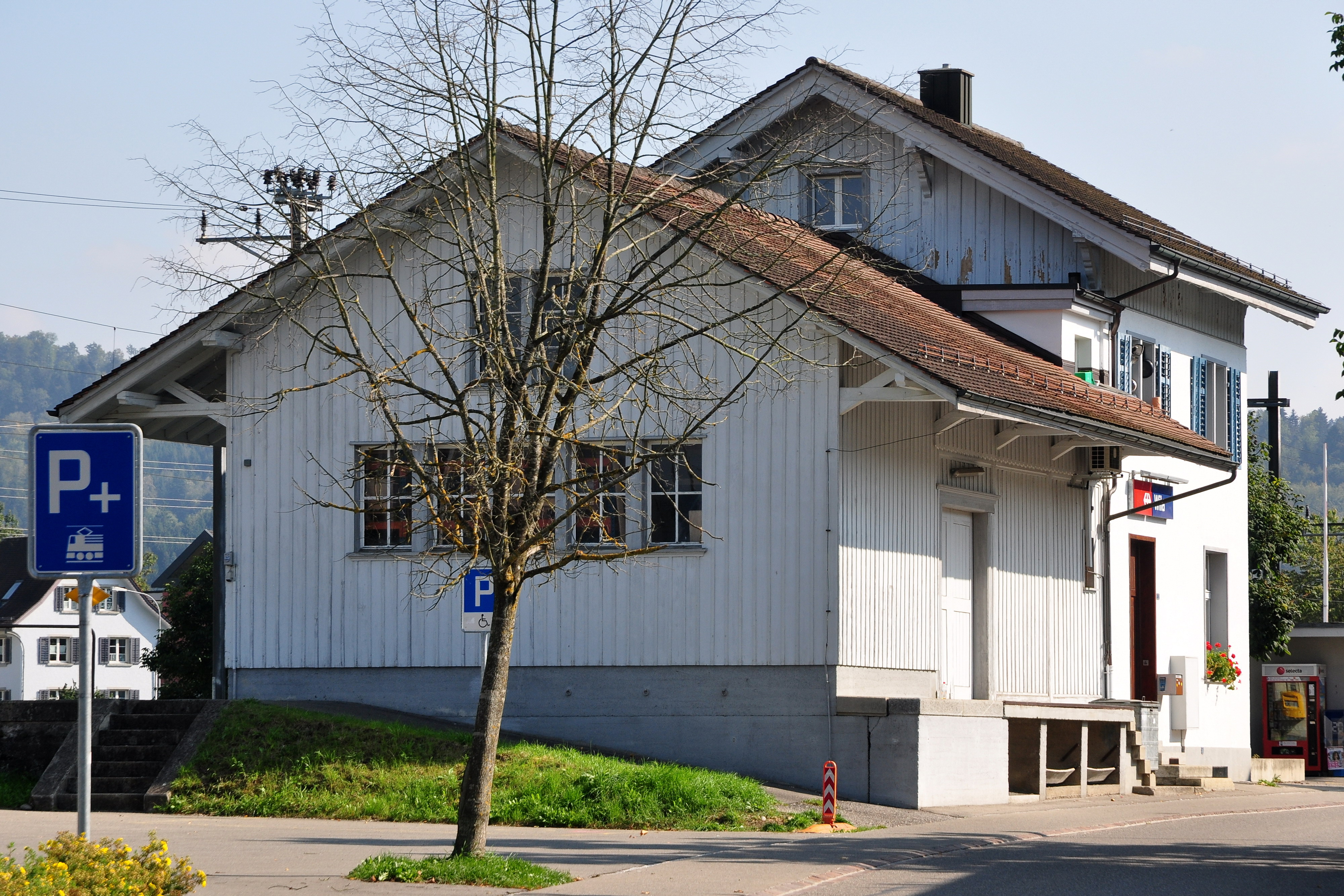
Wila railway station.

== Operation (S26) ==
S26
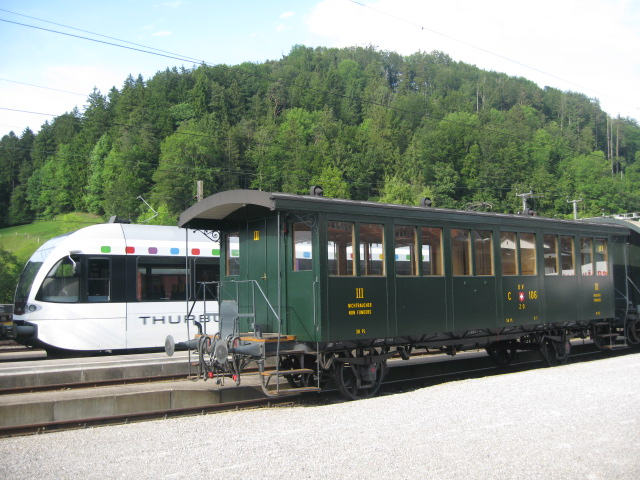
- S26 Thurbo GTW in Bauma next to coaches of DVZO heritage railway in 2009

Overview
- Service type: Zurich S-Bahn service
- Current operator: Thurbo

Route
- Termini: Winterthur; Rüti ZH
- Stops: 15
- Service frequency: Every 30 minutes

Technical
- Rolling stock: Thurbo GTW

=== Route ===
The line runs from its northern terminus Winterthur Hauptbahnhof, the main station of the city of Winterthur, to its southern terminus at Rüti ZH station, which is an intermediate stop on the railway line from Zurich to Rapperswil via Uster. In so doing it passes through the Zürcher Oberland following the valleys of the rivers Töss (Töss Valley) and Jona, traversing their drainage divide at Gibswil.

Along its route, the line serves the following stations:

- Winterthur Hauptbahnhof
- Winterthur Grüze
- Winterthur Seen
- Sennhof-Kyburg
- Kollbrunn
- Rikon
- Rämismühle-Zell
- Turbenthal
- Wila
- Saland
- Bauma
- Steg
- Fischenthal
- Gibswil
- Wald
- Tann-Dürnten
- Rüti ZH

=== Services ===
- S26 Winterthur–Bauma–Rüti ZH
- S11 Aarau–Lenzburg–Dietikon–Zürich HB–Zürich Stettbach–Winterthur–Seuzach/Sennhof-Kyburg (–Wila)
  Operates non stop between Stettbach and Winterthur; the lines to Seuzach and Sennhof-Kyburg are operated alternately at hourly intervals; supplementary trains to Wila.

Zurich S-Bahn network as of December 2018

The S26 provides the only regular passenger service over the bulk of the Tösstalbahn. It provides a half-hourly service between Winterthur and Rüti. A journey along the full route takes 64 minutes. After 20:00, trains from Winterthur terminate in Bauma and strations between Bauma and Rüti are served by busses.

The stations in the Winterthur suburbs are also served by other S-Bahn services, with the S12 and S35 serving Winterthur Grüze (combined half-hourly service), while the S11 also serves Winterthur Seen and Sennhof-Kyburg hourly. During peak-hour, the S11 also serves stations between Sennhof-Kyburg and Wila every hour.

=== Rolling stock ===
The S26 service is in the hands of Stadler GTW units provided by THURBO.

== See also ==
- Rail transport in Switzerland
- Public transport in Zurich
- ZVV fare zones
