= Rüti ZH railway station =

Railway station in Switzerland

Rüti ZH
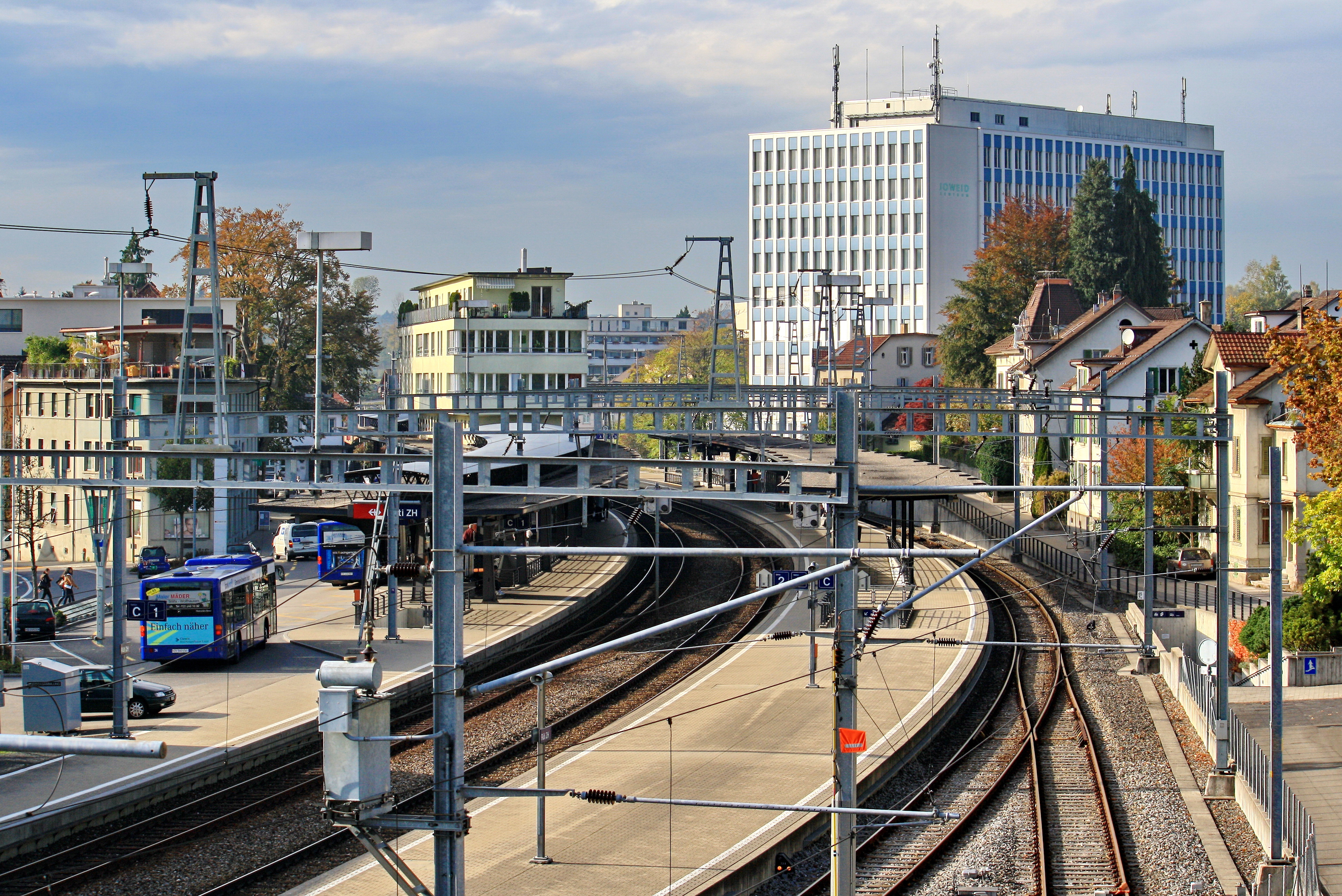
- Rüti railway station from the south-east

General information
- Location: Bahnhofstrasse, Rüti, Canton of Zurich, Switzerland
- Coordinates: 47.260126°N 8.85468°E
- Elevation: 482 m (1,581 ft)
- Owner: Swiss Federal Railways
- Operator: Swiss Federal Railways
- Line: Wallisellen–Uster–Rapperswil; Tösstalbahn
- Platforms: 1 side platform, 1 island platform
- Tracks: 3
- Connections
- Bus: Schneider bus line 631; VZO buses 870 878 880 884 885 888

Other information
- Fare zone: 134 (ZVV)

History
- Opened: 1859
- Electrified: 1932

Passengers
- 2025: 12,000 per day (SBB, Thurbo)
- Rank: 66 out of 1,095 (Note: Tied with Ziegelbrücke railway station.)

Services
Preceding station	Zurich S-Bahn	Following station
Bubikon towards Zug	S5	Jona towards Pfäffikon SZ
Bubikon towards Niederweningen	S15	Jona towards Rapperswil
Tann-Dürnten towards Winterthur	S26	Terminus
Bubikon towards Knonau	SN5 Limited service	Jona towards Pfäffikon SZ
Location
- Location within Switzerland Location within Canton of Zurich

Rüti ZH (German: Bahnhof Rüti ZH) is a railway station in the municipality of Rüti in the Swiss canton of Zurich (abbreviated to ZH). The station is located on the Wallisellen to Rapperswil line just south-west of its junction with the Tösstalbahn from Winterthur via Wald. It is served by passenger trains of the Zurich S-Bahn. It lies within fare zone 134 of the Zürcher Verkehrsverbund (ZVV).

== History ==
The station opened in 1859, shortly after the opening of the Uster to Rapperswil portion of the Wallisellen to Rapperswil line in 1858. Although the line was originally promoted by an independent company, by the time Rüti station opened it was owned by the Vereinigte Schweizerbahnen (VSB) railway company.

The line to Wald opened in 1876, making Rüti into a junction station. The line was independently owned but operated by the VSB. The VSB became part of the Swiss Federal Railways (SBB) in 1902, at which point operation of the line to Wald was taken over by the Tösstalbahn (TTB) that already ran from Winterthur to Wald. Both the line to Wald and the TTB itself became part of the SBB in 1918.

The Wallisellen to Rapperswil line was electrified in 1932, and the line to Wald in 1944.

== Operation ==
=== Services ===
The station is served by Zurich S-Bahn lines S5 and S15, which run between Zürich and Rapperswil. Between them, they provide four trains per hour throughout the day, with a journey time from Zürich Hauptbahnhof of just over 30 minutes. The station is also the terminus of line S26 from Winterthur over the Tösstalbahn, with a journey time of 50 minutes. During weekends, there is also a nighttime S-Bahn service (SN5) offered by ZVV.

Summary of all S-Bahn services:

- Zurich S-Bahn:
  - S5: half-hourly service to Zug via Zürich HB, and to Pfäffikon SZ via Rapperswil.
  - S15: half-hourly service to Niederweningen via Zurich HB, and to Rapperswil.
  - S26: half-hourly service to Winterthur via Wald.
  - Nighttime S-Bahn (only during weekends):
    - SN5: hourly service between Knonau and Pfäffikon SZ (via Zürich HB).

The station is also served by several bus routes of the Verkehrsbetriebe Zürichsee und Oberland (VZO).

=== Layout ===
The station has three through tracks, with a side platform and an island platform providing platform faces on all three tracks. The line north towards Uster is double tracked, whilst the line south towards Rapperswil is single tracked. The line to Wald is single track, and diverges from the line north just north of the station, on the other side of a viaduct across the Jona river.

The principal station entrance and station buildings are on the south side of the station, as is the side platform. They are connected to the island platform, and a secondary entrance to the north of the station, by pedestrian subway.

== Joweid Zahnradbahn ==
An interesting historical remnant to be found at Rüti station are the remains of a rack equipped siding that formerly served the Joweid works of the Maschinenfabrik Rüti to the north west of the station. These works predate the railway, being founded in 1842, and are located at a significantly lower level than the station.

The line, known as the Joweid Zahnradbahn or Joweid rack railway, opened in 1877 with a ruling gradient of 10.2% (1 in 9.8) and a minimum radius of only 80 m (260 ft). It was rebuilt with a new concrete viaduct in 1955. Several of the locomotives built to operate the line still exist, with two (one steam, one diesel) in use on the Rorschach Heiden Bergbahn.

== Gallery ==
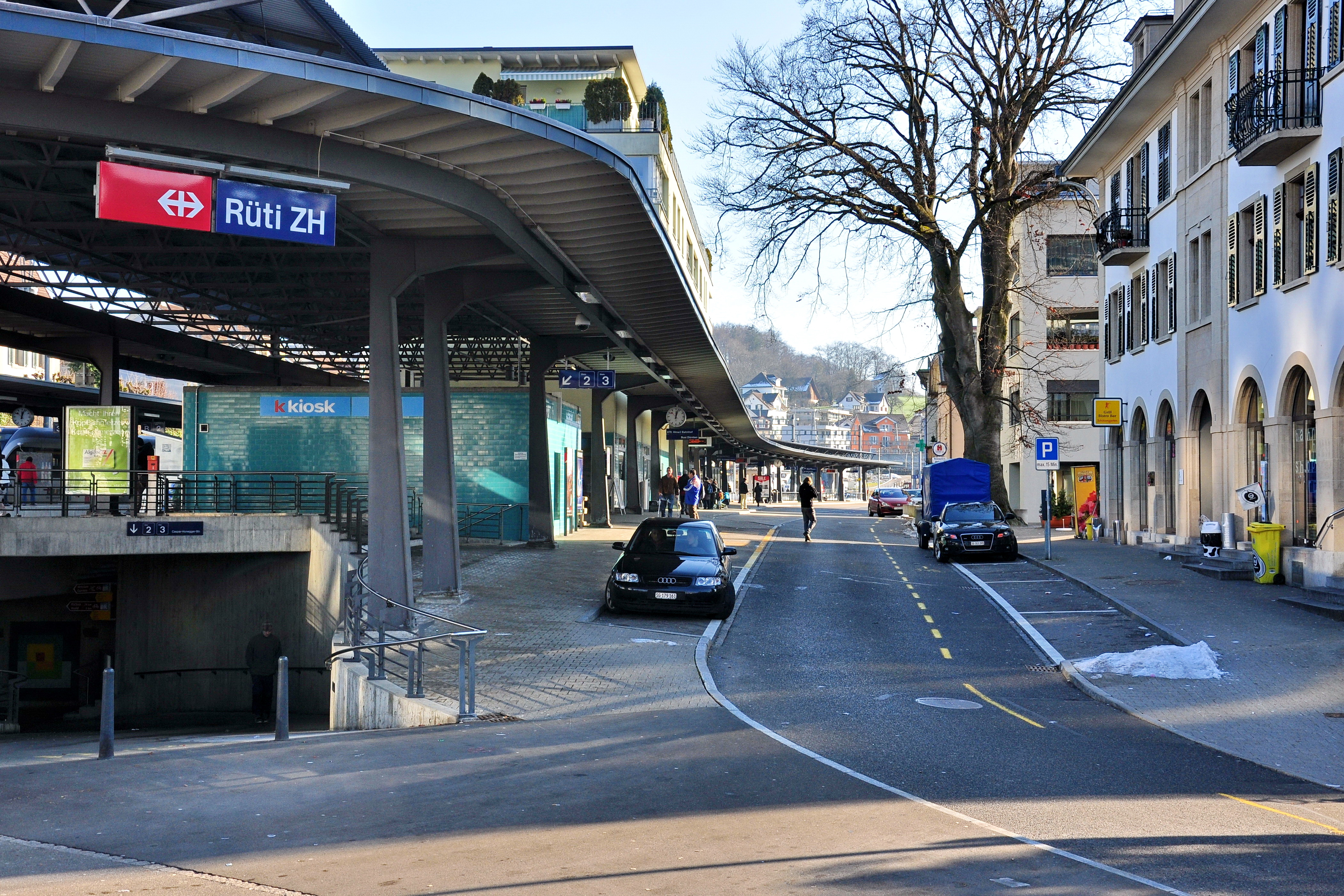
The front of the station

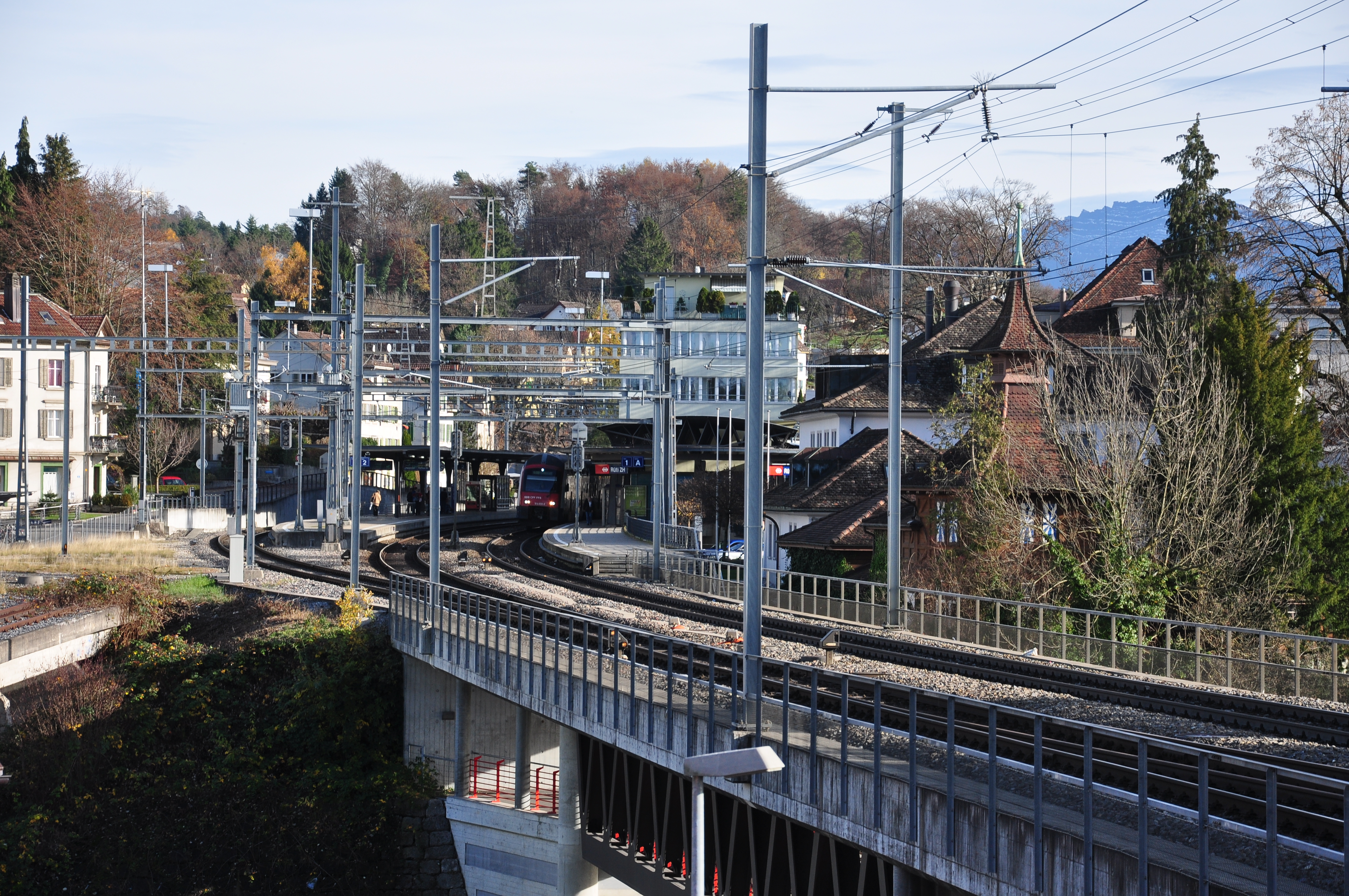
The station seen from the west; the remains of the Joweid Zahnradbahn viaduct and track can be seen to the extreme left

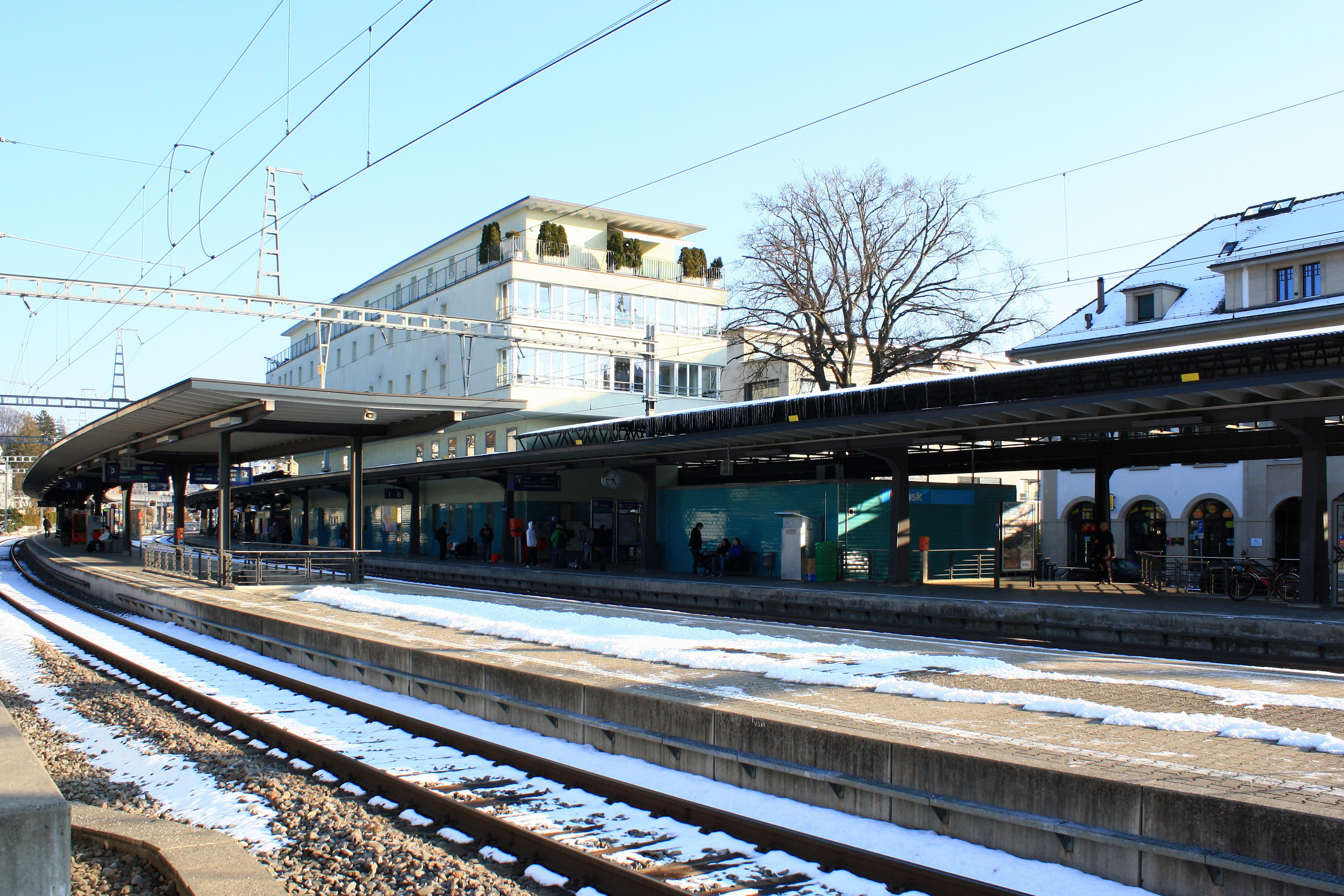
The station building across the station

== See also ==
- Rail transport in Switzerland
