= Schwerzenbach railway station =

Railway station in Switzerland

Schwerzenbach
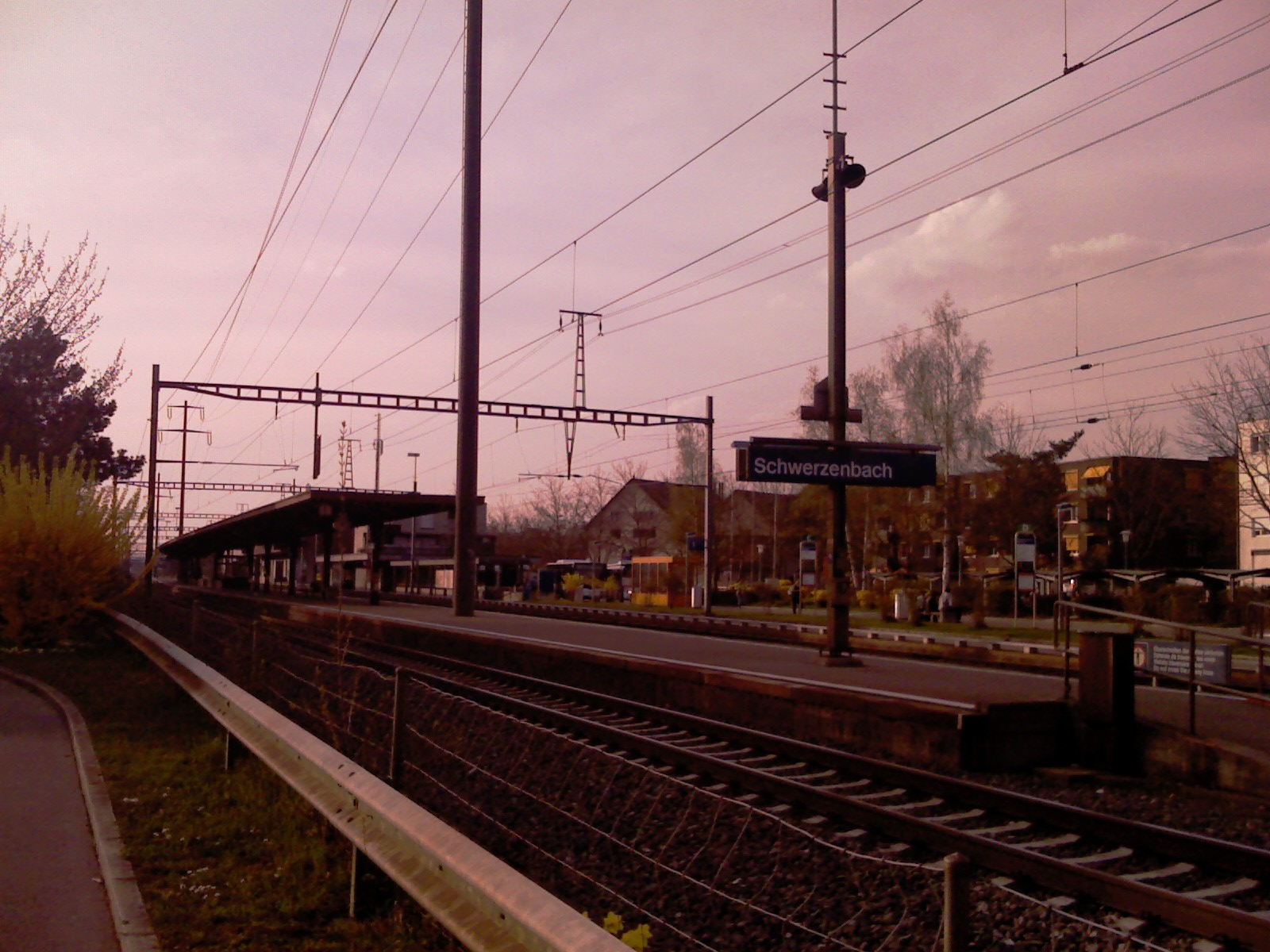

General information
- Location: Bahnstrasse, Schwerzenbach, Canton of Zurich; Switzerland
- Coordinates: 47.384571°N 8.659126°E
- Elevation: 443 m (1,453 ft)
- Owner: Swiss Federal Railways
- Operator: Swiss Federal Railways
- Line: Wallisellen–Uster–Rapperswil
- Platforms: 1 island platform
- Connections
- Bus: VBG buses 704 705 720 721 725 726 727

Other information
- Fare zone: 121 (ZVV)

Passengers
- 2025: 10,100 per day (SBB)
- Rank: 75 out of 1,095 (Note: Tied with Zofingen railway station.)

Services
Preceding station	Zurich S-Bahn	Following station
Dübendorf towards Schaffhausen	S9	Nänikon-Greifensee towards Uster
Dübendorf towards Affoltern am Albis	S14	Nänikon-Greifensee towards Hinwil
Dübendorf towards Bülach	SN9 Limited service	Nänikon-Greifensee towards Uster
Location
- Location within Switzerland Location within Canton of Zürich

Schwerzenbach is a railway station in the Swiss canton of Zurich. It is situated in the municipality of Schwerzenbach on the Wallisellen–Uster–Rapperswil line. It lies within fare zone 121 of the Zürcher Verkehrsverbund (ZVV).

It is the main railway station serving the communities of Schwerzenbach and Volketswil, with close proximity to the Volkiland shopping center and Milandia entertainment park. As of 2019, the station offers an SBB office and a Migrolino convenience store.

== Service ==
Schwerzenbach station is served by Zurich S-Bahn lines S9 and S14. During weekends, there is also a nighttime S-Bahn service (SN9) offered by ZVV. Rail services are summarized as follows:

- Zurich S-Bahn:
  - S9: half-hourly service between Uster and Rafz/Schaffhausen via Stadelhofen and Zürich HB.
  - S14: half-hourly service to Affoltern am Albis via Wallisellen and Zürich HB, and to Hinwil via Wetzikon.
  - Nighttime S-Bahn (only during weekends):
    - SN9: hourly service between Bülach and Uster (via Zürich HB).

In addition, several buses of Verkehrsbetriebe Glattal (VBG) depart from the bus station adjacent to the railway station.

== See also ==
- Rail transport in Switzerland
