= Nänikon-Greifensee railway station =

Railway station in Canton of Zürich, Switzerland

Nänikon-Greifensee
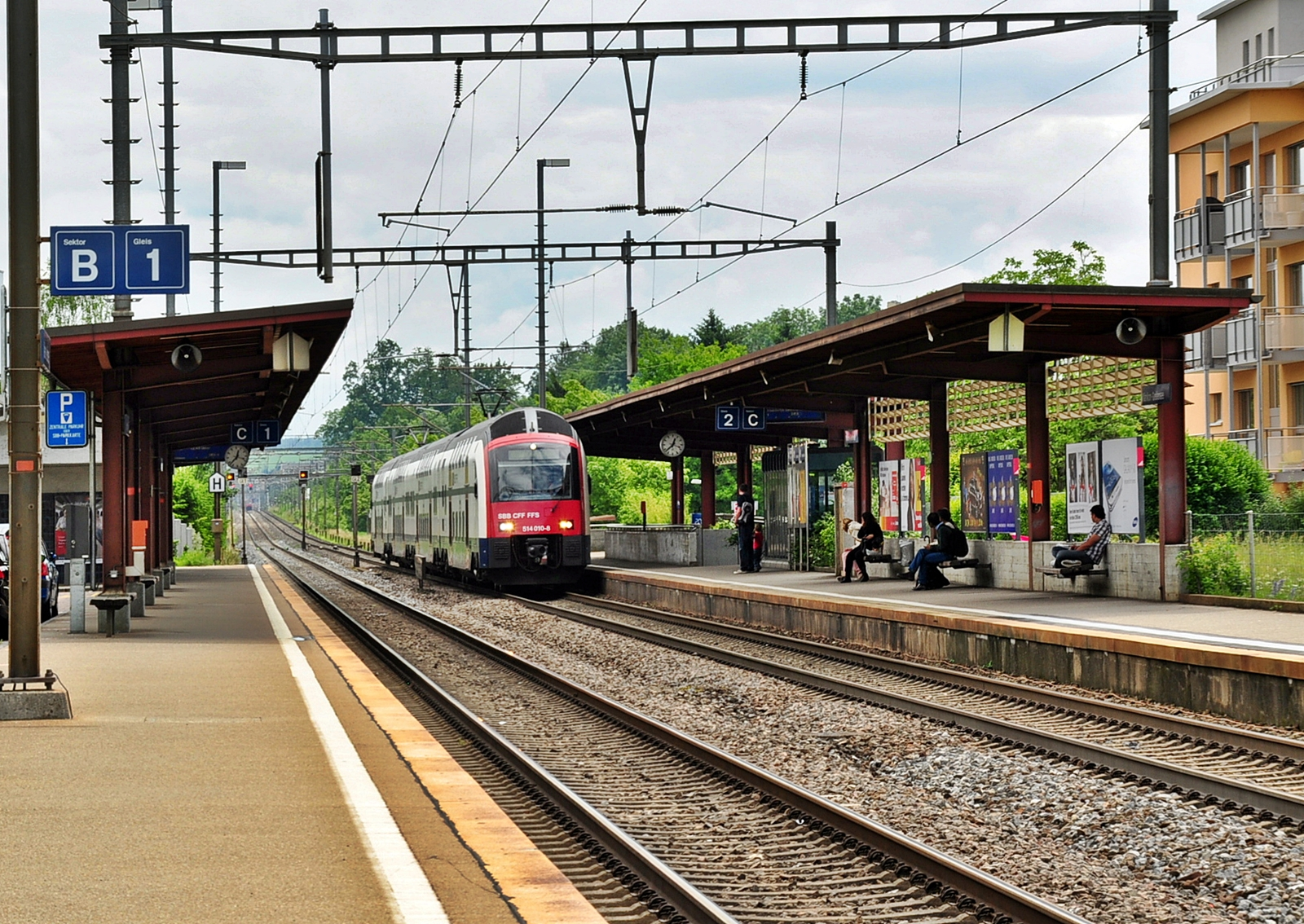
- The station's platforms in 2012

General information
- Location: Stationstrasse, Nänikon, Uster, Canton of Zürich, Switzerland
- Coordinates: 47.36907°N 8.686624°E
- Elevation: 449 m (1,473 ft)
- Owner: Swiss Federal Railways
- Operator: Swiss Federal Railways
- Line: Wallisellen–Uster–Rapperswil
- Platforms: 2 side platforms
- Tracks: 2

Other information
- Fare zone: 130 (ZVV)

Services
| Preceding station | Zurich S-Bahn | Following station |
|---|---|---|
| Schwerzenbach towards Schaffhausen | S9 | Uster Terminus |
| Schwerzenbach towards Affoltern am Albis | S14 | Uster towards Hinwil |
| Schwerzenbach towards Bülach | SN9 Limited service | Uster Terminus |
Location
- Location within Switzerland Location within Canton of Zurich

Nänikon-Greifensee is a railway station in the Swiss canton of Zurich. It is situated between the villages of Nänikon, in the municipality of Uster, and the town of Greifensee, within fare zone 130 of the Zürcher Verkehrsverbund (ZVV). The station is on the Wallisellen–Uster–Rapperswil line.

== Service ==
Nänikon-Greifensee station is served by Zurich S-Bahn lines S9 and S14. During weekends, there is also a nighttime S-Bahn service (SN9) offered by ZVV. Rail services are summarized as follows:

- Zurich S-Bahn:
  - S9: half-hourly service between Uster and Rafz/Schaffhausen via Stadelhofen and Zürich HB.
  - S14: half-hourly service to Affoltern am Albis via Wallisellen and Zürich HB, and to Hinwil via Wetzikon.
  - Nighttime S-Bahn (only during weekends):
    - SN9: hourly service between Bülach and Uster (via Zürich HB).

== See also ==
- Rail transport in Switzerland
