= Jucker Farm =

Swiss agritourism and agriculture production and distribution company

Coordinates: 47°20.6′N 8°46.4′E

Jucker Farm is a Swiss agrotourism company and agriculture producer and distributor, that operates three farm estates including restaurants and three farm shops. Based in Seegräben in the canton of Zurich, Jucker Farm is known for the agricultural events, among them the biggest pumpkin festival in Switzerland, and Jucker Farm is also the most important pumpkin producer respectively distributor in Switzerland.

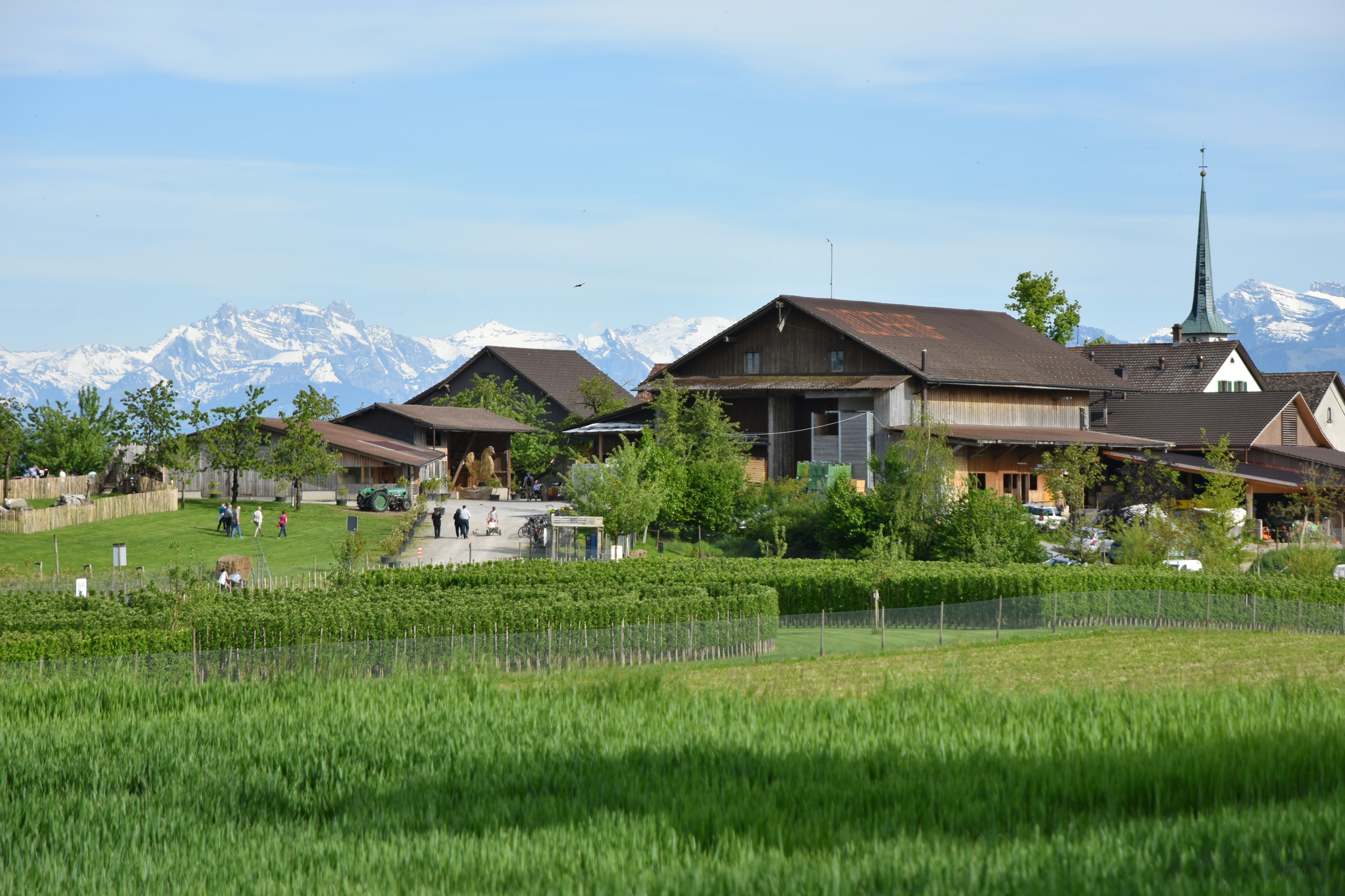
Juckerhof farm in Seegräben

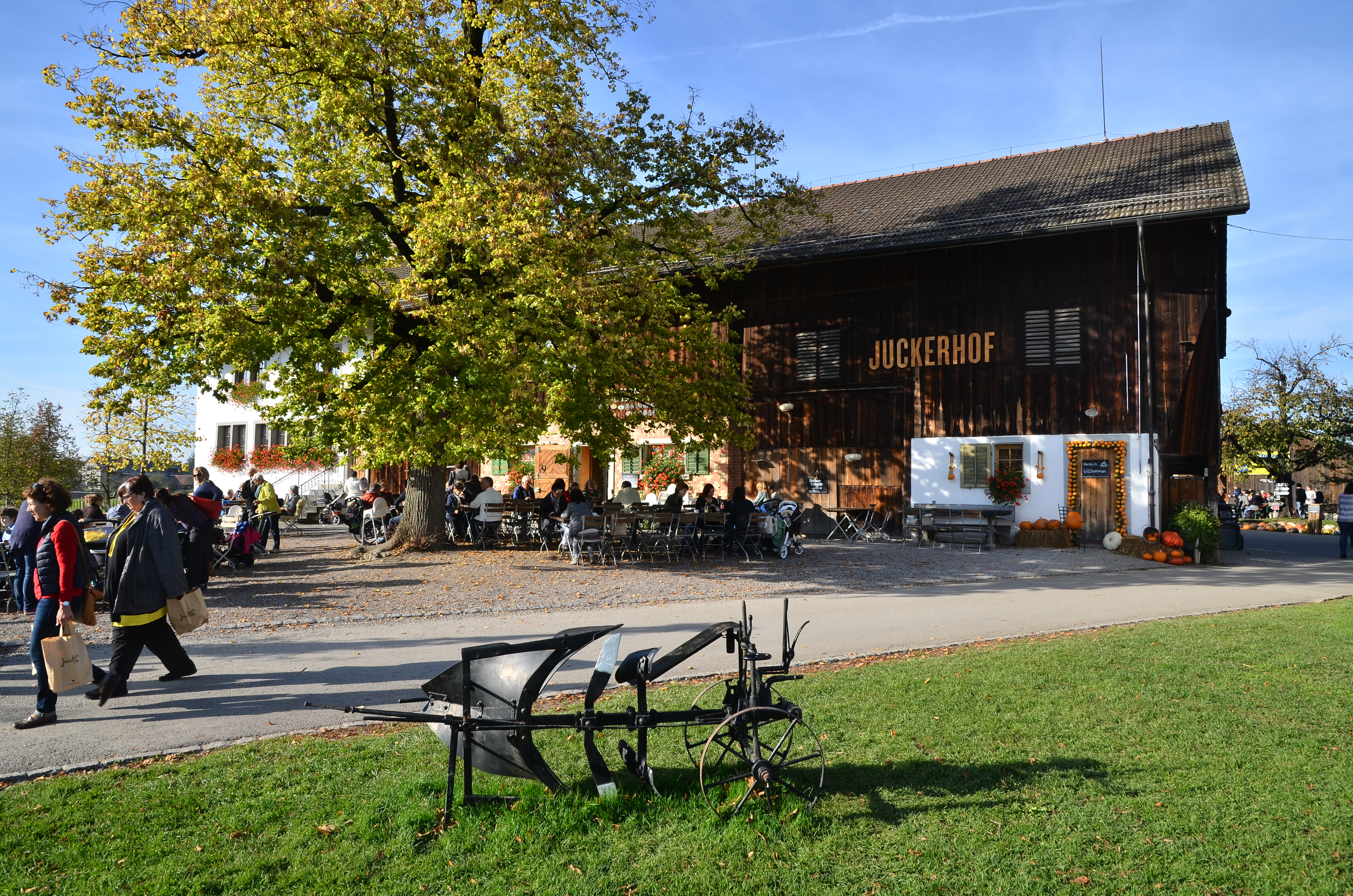
Juckerhof farm and restaurant in Seegräben

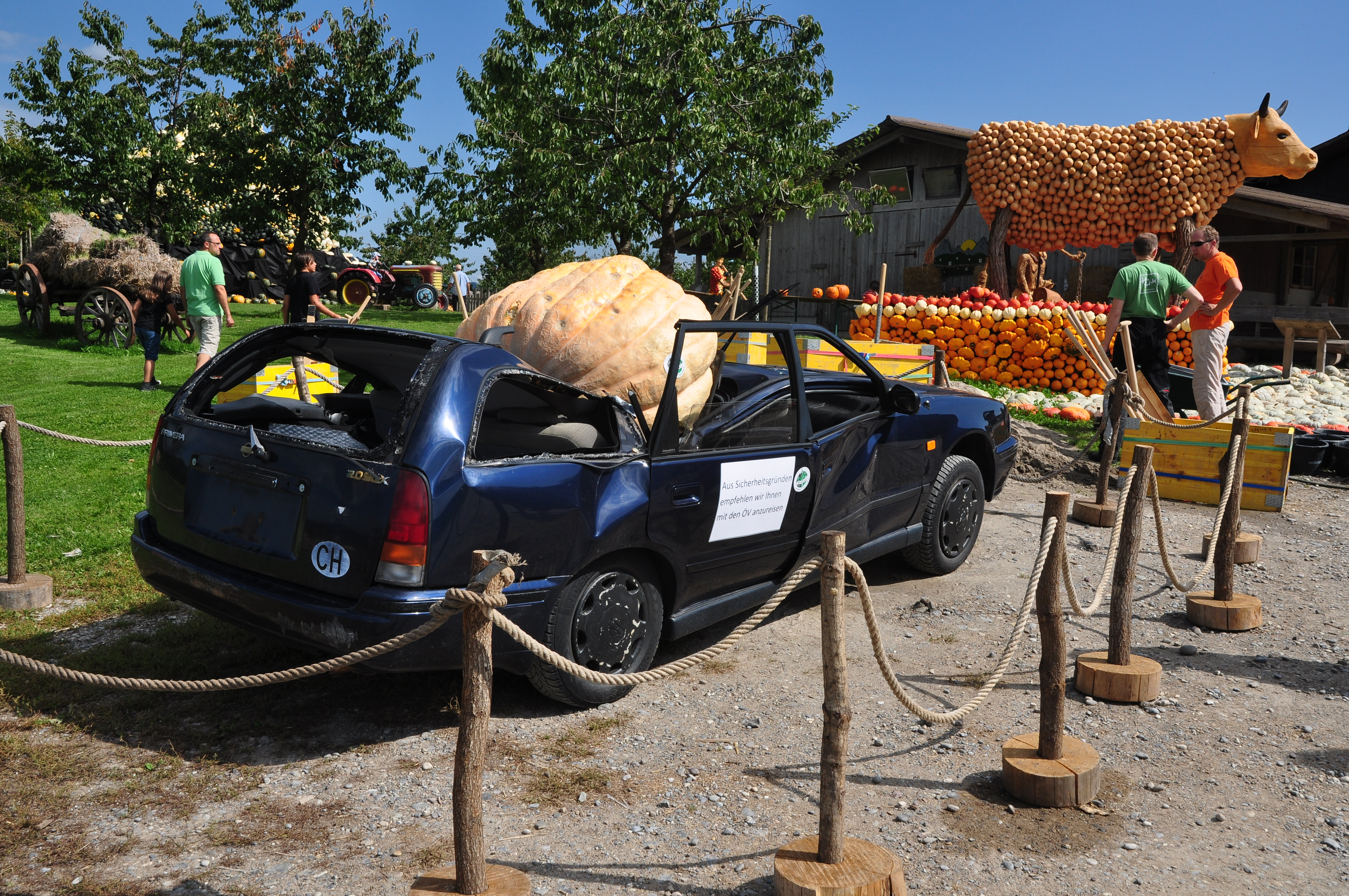
pumpkin 'jumbo' of 2011

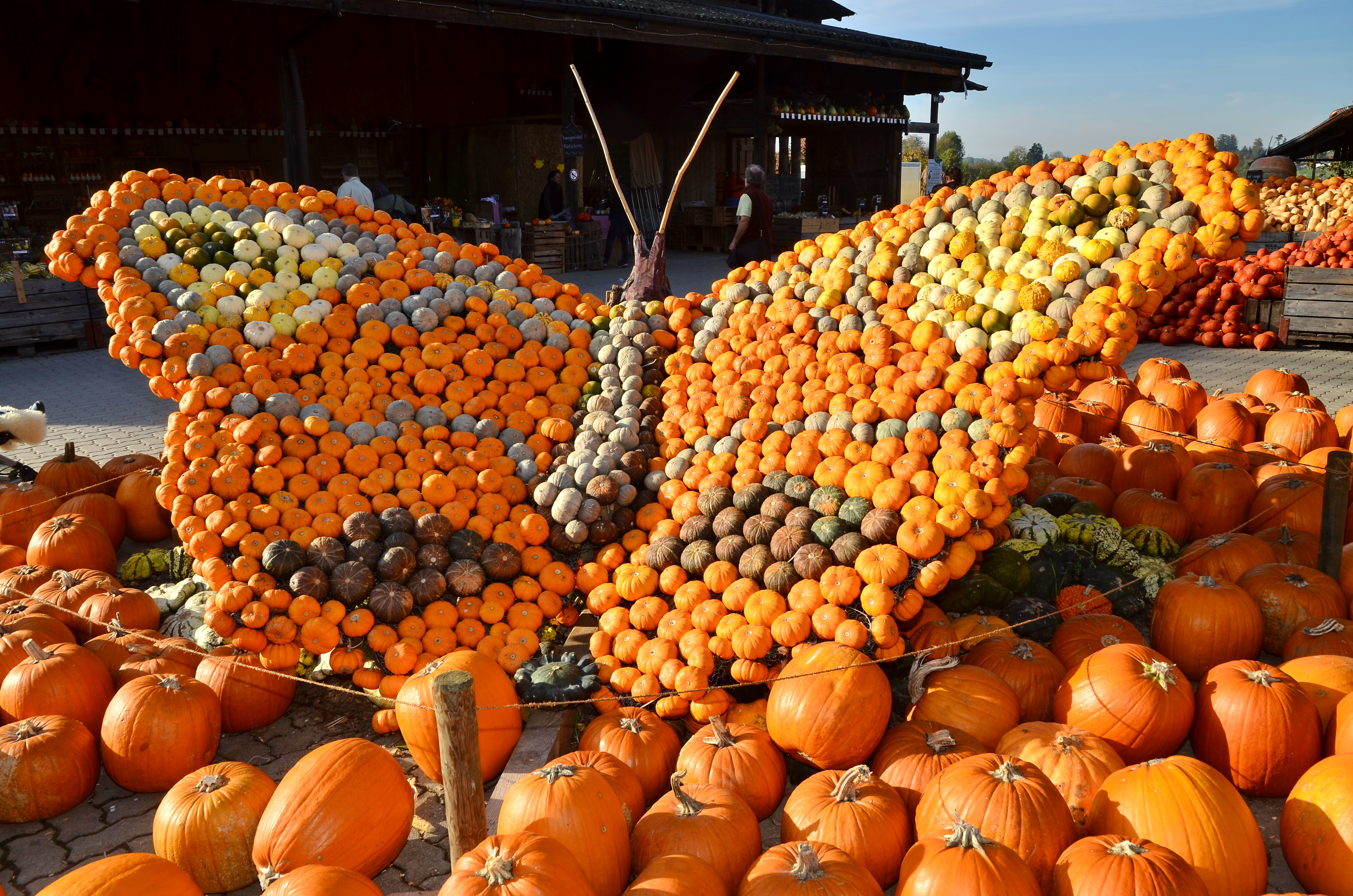
2014 pumpkin festival

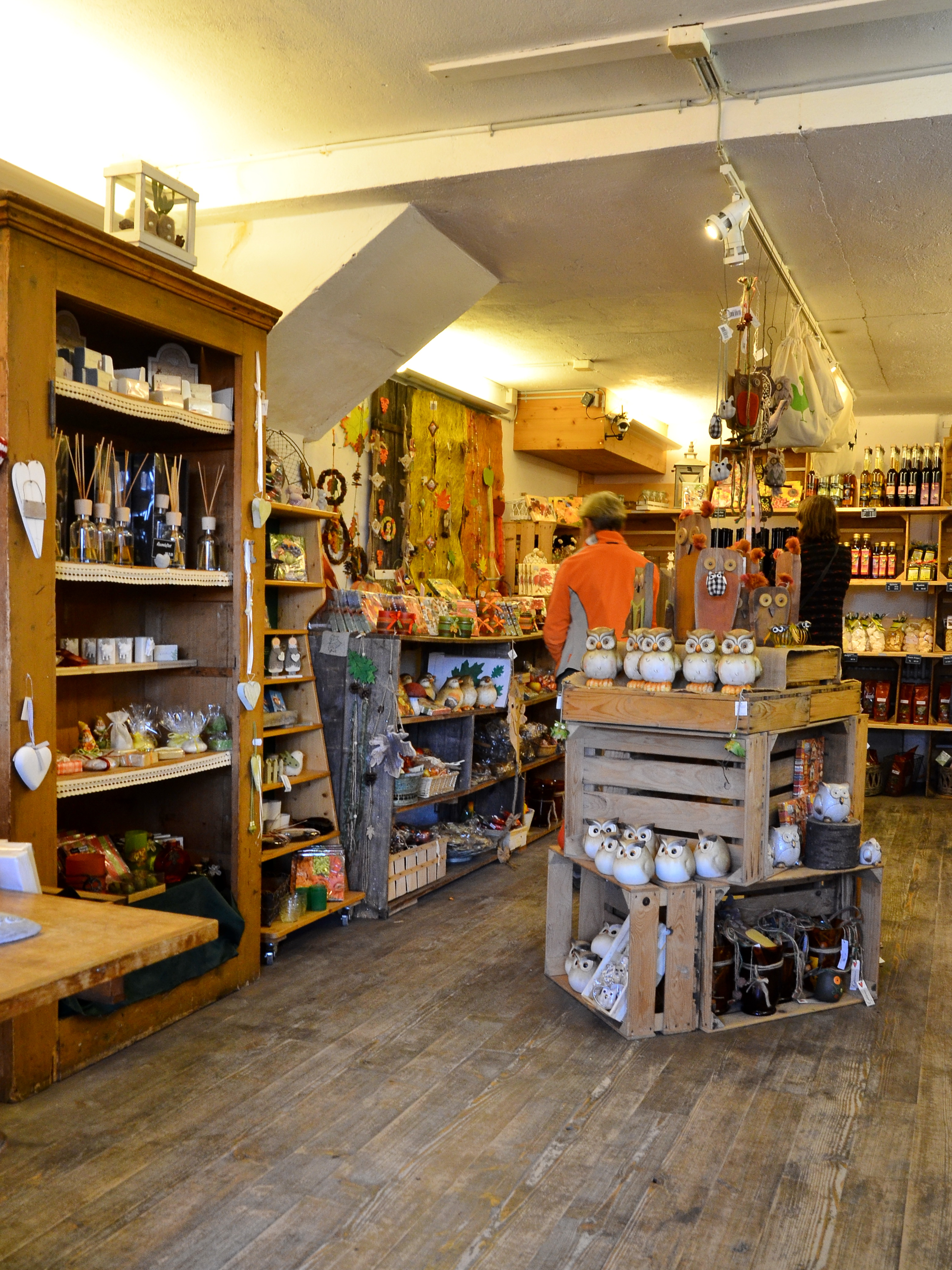
farm shop in Seegräben

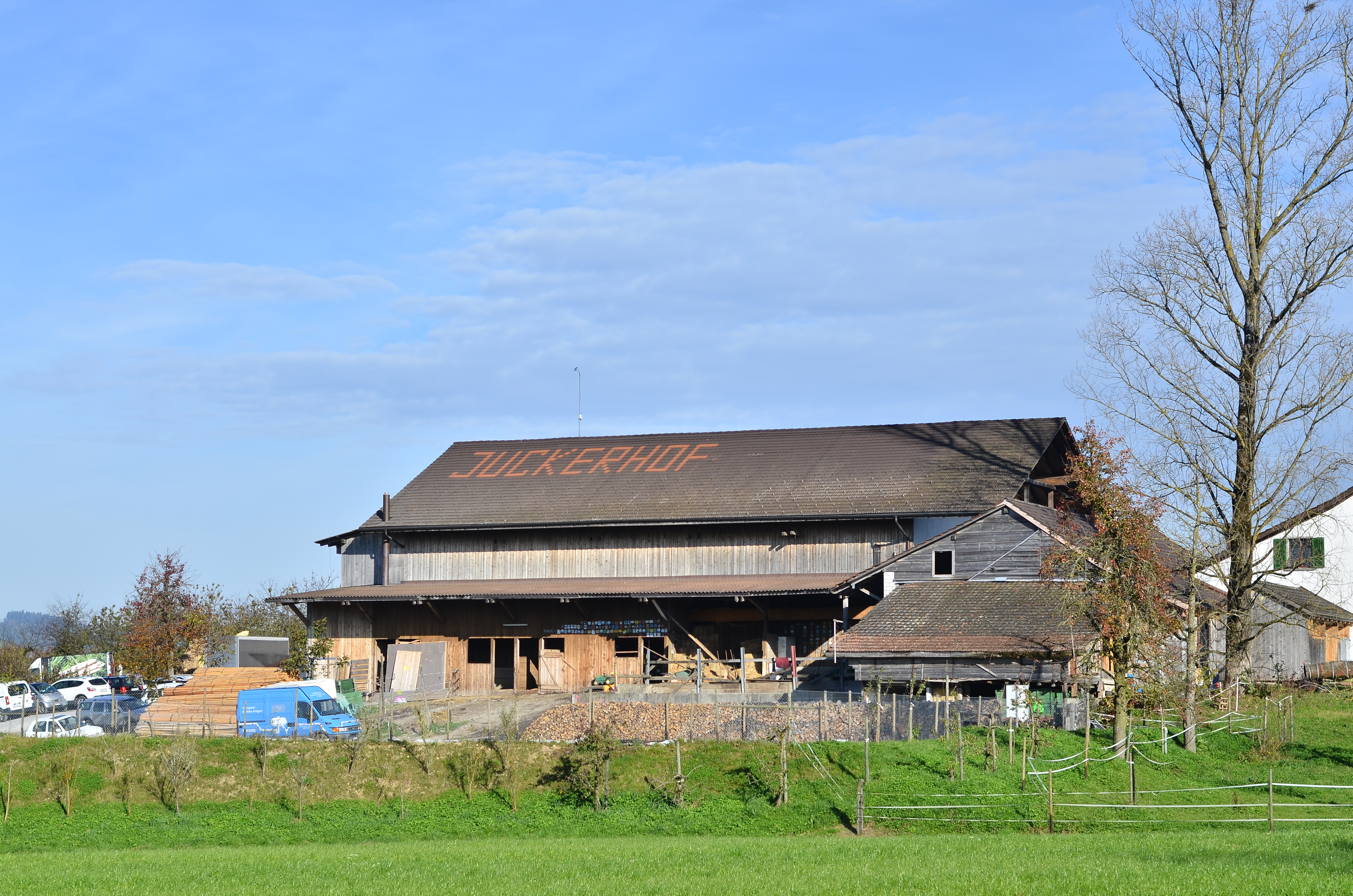

== History ==
Basing on the Jucker family's tradition to operate their farm in Seegräben on Pfäffikersee shore and their mother's small estate in Rafz, the brothers Beat Jucker and Martin Jucker established in 2000 the Farmart AG (Aktiengesellschaft), which was renamed in 2013 as Jucker Farm AG. As of November 2014, the company owns three farms, including affiliated companies and Jucker Farmart Expo GmbH (Germany) that organizes, among others in the Europapark Rust, pumpkin events in southern Germany. Jucker Farm employs around 150 employees in its operations, i.e. in the three farms and associated farm shops, and two restaurants, that have, depending on weather, between 100 and 8,000 visitors daily.

== Agriculture ==
Among the common agricultural products and the apple orchards, the pumpkin farming is remarkable. The former Jucker Farmart marketed already in 2000 the pumpkin products of about a hundred Swiss farmers: "We are not the only farm selling such products, but probably we are of the size and nature to but unique in Switzerland," said Beat Jucker in an interview, and estimated that their products have between 30 and 50 percent of the total domestic volume account in Switzerland. Around 300 different varieties of pumpkin, of which about 20 main sorts, are distributed; in 2000 about 5,000 tonnes (11,000,000 pounds) pumpkin were sold. The farms sell in the farm shops also books about this plant, Halloween pumpkin cut sets and offer the organization of pumpkin markets, festivals and exhibitions. Jucker Farm therefore claims to be the most important producer of organically-farmed pumpkins in Switzerland.

== Locations and offers ==
=== Agrotourism ===
The so-called experience farmyards (in German: Erlebnishöfe) provided by the Jucker family in Seegräben (Juckerhof) on Pfäffikersee and in Jona (Bächlihof) on Obersee lakeshore are also nationally known day-trip destinations. In addition to the farm shops and catering, there are for children a nature playground, a goat enclosure, seasonal self picking of fruits and an apple orchard with labyrinth and mazes. Nationally known are the family annual major events, including Switzerland's most important pumpkin festival from September to November: On 5 October 2014, a new international record was established by a pumpkin weighing 953.5 kilograms (2,102 pounds), at least for some days, but being still the biggest pumpkin in Switzerland.

=== Farm restaurants ===
The HofChuchi restaurant in Seegräben is opened 365 days a year. The menu features a wide choice of seasonal and regional products cultivated by their own and also includes agricultural procuts of other local providers, as well as breakfast, lunch and dinner, the latter in winter only during limited opening times. The two restaurants in Seegräben (Juckerhof) and Rapperswil-Jona (Bächlihof), canton of St. Gallen, offer a catering company for corporate events, seminars and private events.

=== Farm shops ===
The three farm shops are operated by the farms: Juckerhof in Seegräben, Bächlihof in Jona and Spargelhof in Rafz. The shops are open 365 days a year and offer the agricultural products grown in the region and specialities produced by other local agricultural producers. An adjoint farm's bakery at Seegräben was established in May 2015.

Jucker Farm is partner of the web-based store farmy.ch that was awarded by the Swiss E-Commerce Award in June 2015.

=== Transport ===
In order to force the public transportation and to avoid massive individual traffic, a shuttle-bus operates during peak season between Aathal railway station, served by the Zurich S-Bahn line S14, and the Juckerhof farm in Seegräben. Bächlihof in Jona is connected by the local bus 991 (Grünfeld bus stop) operating between Jona railway station (served by Zurich S-Bahn lines S5 and S15) and Rapperswil railway station (additionally served by Zurich S-Bahn lines S7 and S40, St. Gallen S-Bahn lines S4, S6 and S17, and the Voralpen Express).

== Awards ==
- 2013: Tourismuspreis Schweiz 2013 - Herausragendes Projekt, 1. Preis
- 2014: Ernst & Young Entrepreneur of the Year - «Family Business»
- 2015: Swiss E-Commerce Award for the webstore farmy.ch.

Jucker Farm was nominated by Ernst & Young for the EY Entrepreneur of the Year «Services/Trade» awards, and awarded on 24 October 2014 as Entrepreneur of the Year.

== See also ==
- Agriculture in Switzerland
- Tourism in Switzerland
