= Aathal railway station =

Railway station in the canton of Zürich, Switzerland

Aathal
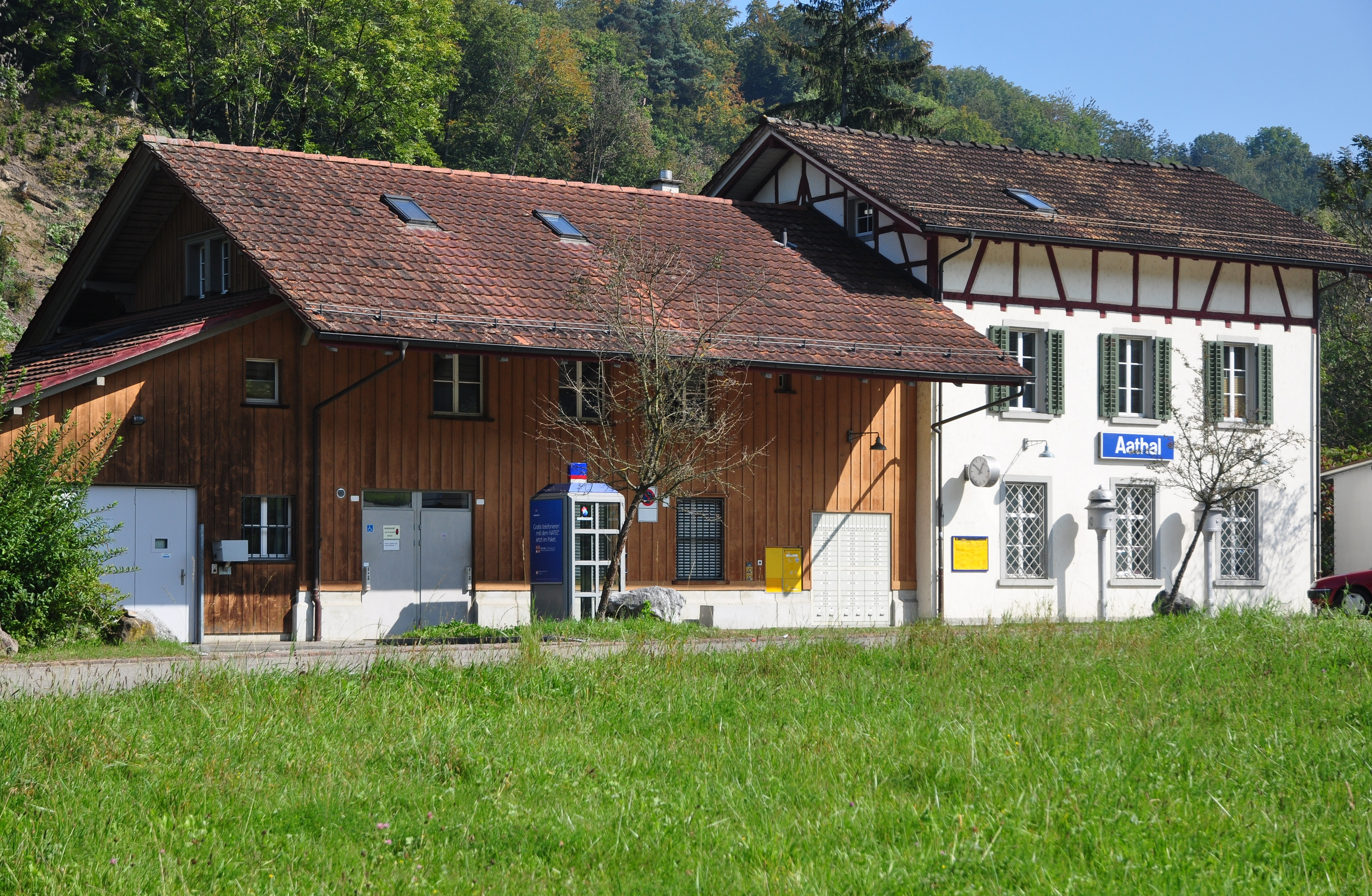
- The former station buildings, seen from the current station

General information
- Location: Gstalderstrasse, Aathal, Seegräben, Canton of Zürich, Switzerland
- Coordinates: 47.335435°N 8.766296°E
- Elevation: 506 m (1,660 ft)
- Owner: Swiss Federal Railways
- Operator: Swiss Federal Railways
- Line: Wallisellen–Uster–Rapperswil line
- Platforms: 1 island platform
- Tracks: 2

Other information
- Fare zone: 132 (ZVV)

Services
Preceding station	Zurich S-Bahn	Following station
Uster towards Affoltern am Albis	S14	Wetzikon towards Hinwil
Uster towards Knonau	SN5 Limited service	Wetzikon towards Pfäffikon SZ
Location
- Location within Switzerland Location within Canton of Zurich

Aathal is a railway station in the municipality of Seegräben in the Swiss canton of Zurich. It is located on the Wallisellen to Rapperswil via Uster line, within fare zone 132 of the Zürcher Verkehrsverbund (ZVV).

The station is close to the Aathal Dinosaur Museum and a 15 minute walk from Jucker Farm in Seegräben.

== Service ==
The station is served by Zurich S-Bahn route S14. During weekends, there is also a nighttime S-Bahn service (SN5) offered by ZVV.

Summary of all S-Bahn services:

- Zurich S-Bahn:
  - S14: half-hourly service to Affoltern am Albis via Zürich HB, and to Hinwil via Wetzikon.
  - Nighttime S-Bahn (only during weekends):
    - SN5: hourly service between Knonau and Pfäffikon SZ (via Zürich HB).

== History ==
The current station opened in May 1990, as the result of a realignment that was needed in order to accommodate double track on the line. The earlier station building still exists, in other usage, some 75 m (246 ft) north of the current station.

== See also ==
- Rail transport in Switzerland
