= Bubikon railway station =

Railway station in the canton of Zürich, Switzerland

Bubikon
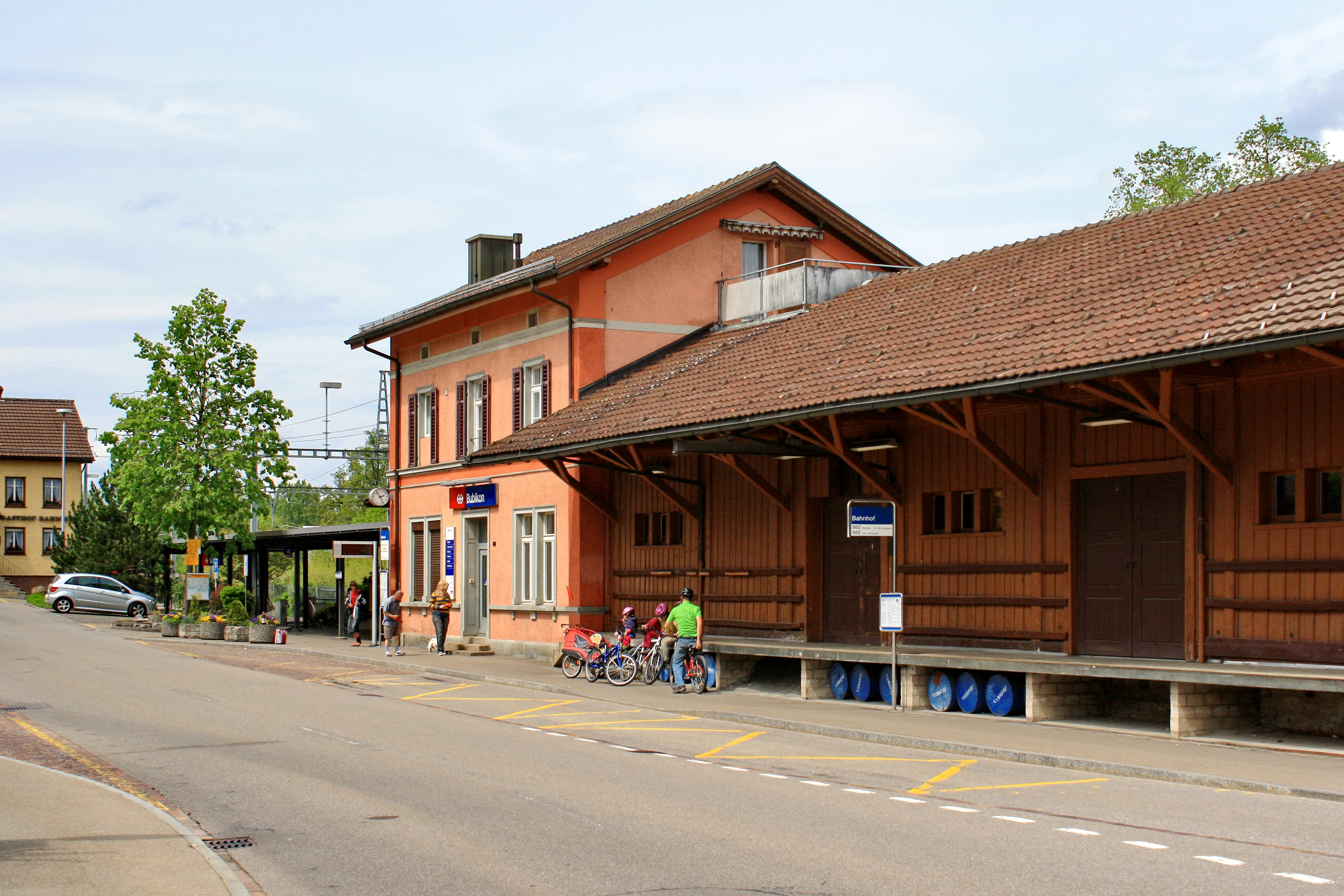
- The station building in 2010

General information
- Location: Stationstrasse, Bubikon, Canton of Zurich, Switzerland
- Coordinates: 47.270705°N 8.822907°E
- Elevation: 509 m (1,670 ft)
- Owner: Swiss Federal Railways
- Operator: Swiss Federal Railways
- Lines: Wallisellen–Uster–Rapperswil line Uerikon–Bauma line (closed)
- Platforms: 1 island platform
- Tracks: 2
- Connections: Zurich Transport Network (ZVV)
- Bus: VZO lines 880 883

Other information
- Fare zone: 133 (ZVV)

Services
| Preceding station | Zurich S-Bahn | Following station |
|---|---|---|
| Wetzikon towards Zug | S5 | Rüti ZH towards Pfäffikon SZ |
| Wetzikon towards Niederweningen | S15 | Rüti ZH towards Rapperswil |
| Wetzikon towards Knonau | SN5 Limited service | Rüti ZH towards Pfäffikon SZ |
Location
- Location within Switzerland Location within Canton of Zurich

Bubikon is a railway station in the municipality of Bubikon in the Swiss canton of Zurich, located within fare zone 133 of the Zürcher Verkehrsverbund (ZVV). The station is situated on the Wallisellen to Uster and Rapperswil railway line and, historically, it was a junction station with the Uerikon–Bauma railway line, which has been mostly dismantled.

== Services ==
The station is served by Zurich S-Bahn lines S5 and S15. During weekends, there is also a nighttime S-Bahn service (SN5) offered by ZVV.

Summary of all S-Bahn services:

- Zurich S-Bahn:
  - S5: half-hourly service to Zug via Zürich HB, and to Pfäffikon SZ via Rapperswil.
  - S15: half-hourly service to Niederweningen via Zurich HB, and to Rapperswil.
  - Nighttime S-Bahn (only during weekends):
    - SN5: hourly service between Knonau and Pfäffikon SZ (via Zürich HB).

The station is additionally served by buses of Verkehrsbetriebe Zürichsee und Oberland (VZO).

== History ==
Bubikon was formerly a junction point with the Uerikon to Bauma railway (UeBB), which diverged from the Wallisellen to Rapperswil line at either end of the station. The UeBB to the south, originally to Uerikon, was still in use as a freight siding as far as Wolfhausen for many years, but as of 2018 this section is no longer connected to the main railway network. The UeBB to the north, originally to Hinwil and Bauma, has been abandoned as far as Hinwil.

== See also ==
- Rail transport in Switzerland
