= Aathal Dinosaur Museum =

Sauriermuseum Aathal
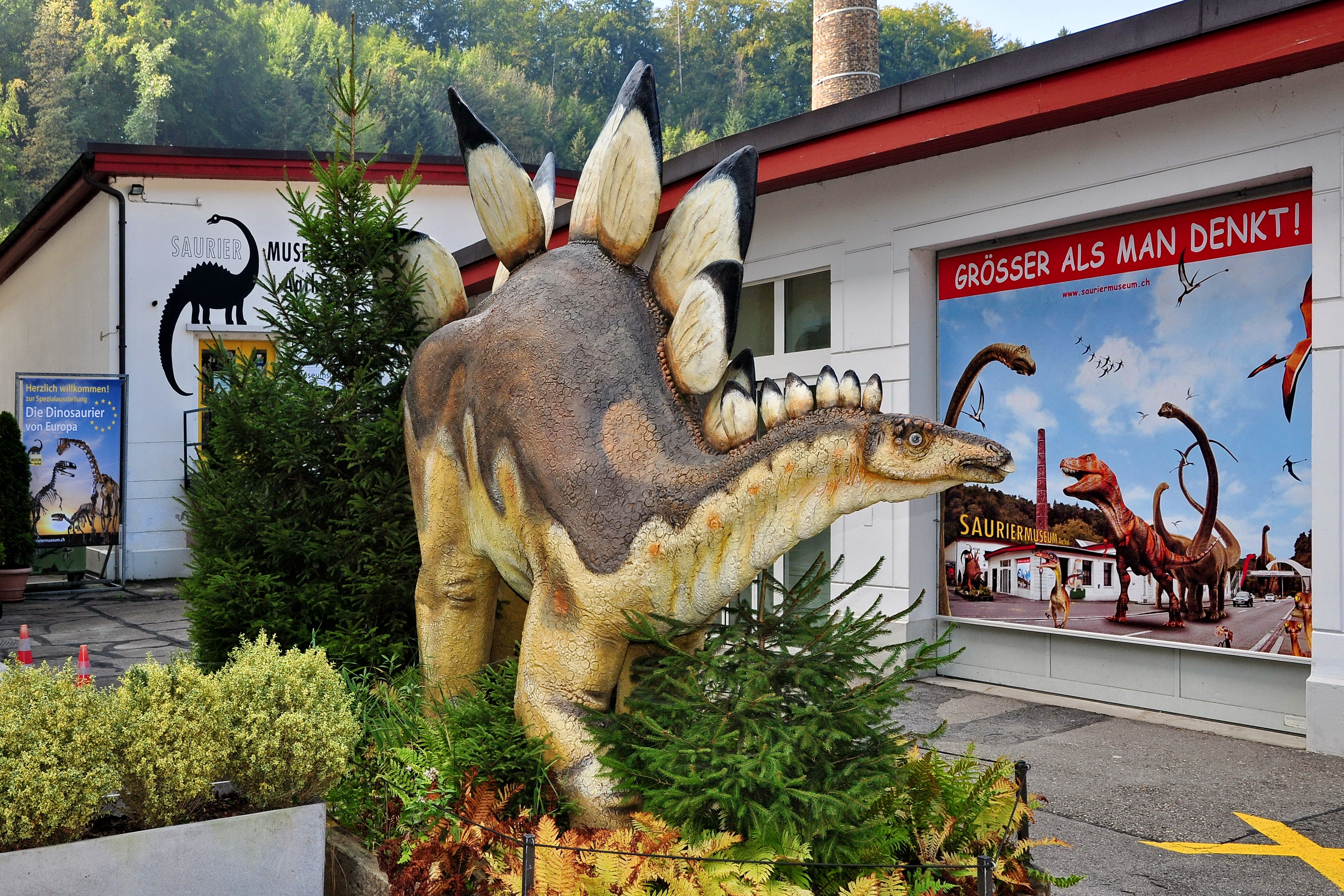
- Established: 1992
- Location: Zürichstrasse 69, 8607 Aathal-Seegräben
- Coordinates: 47.338823°N 8.761881°E
- Type: Dinosaur museum
- Director: Dr. h.c. Hans-Jakob Siber
- Curator: Dr. Thomas Bolliger
- Public transit access: Zurich S-Bahn route S14
- Website: Website in German

The Aathal Dinosaur Museum (Swiss German native name: Sauriermuseum Aathal) is a paleontological museum in the locality Aathal of the municipality of Seegräben in the canton of Zürich, Switzerland, and one of the few dinosaur museums in Europe.

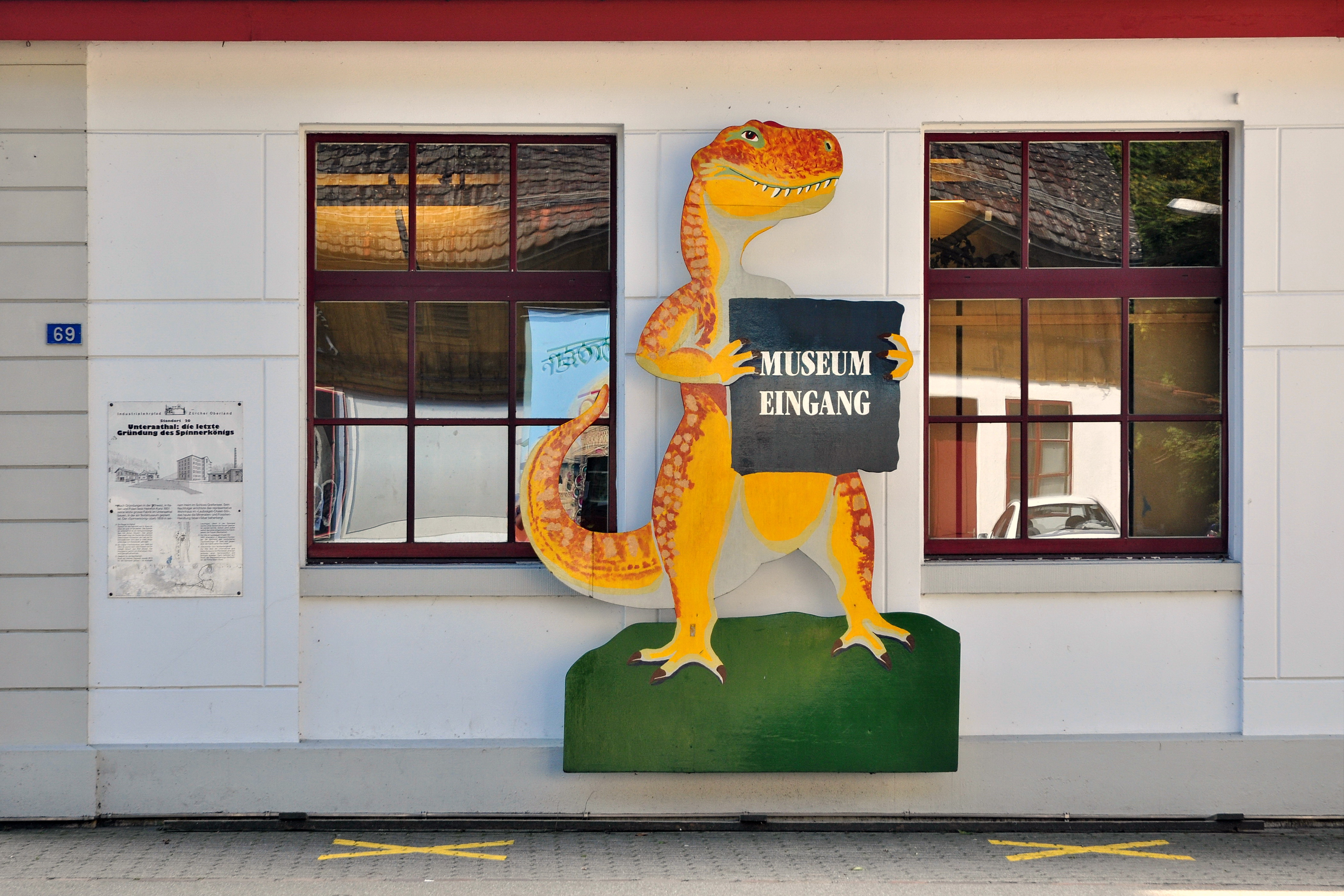
Entrance

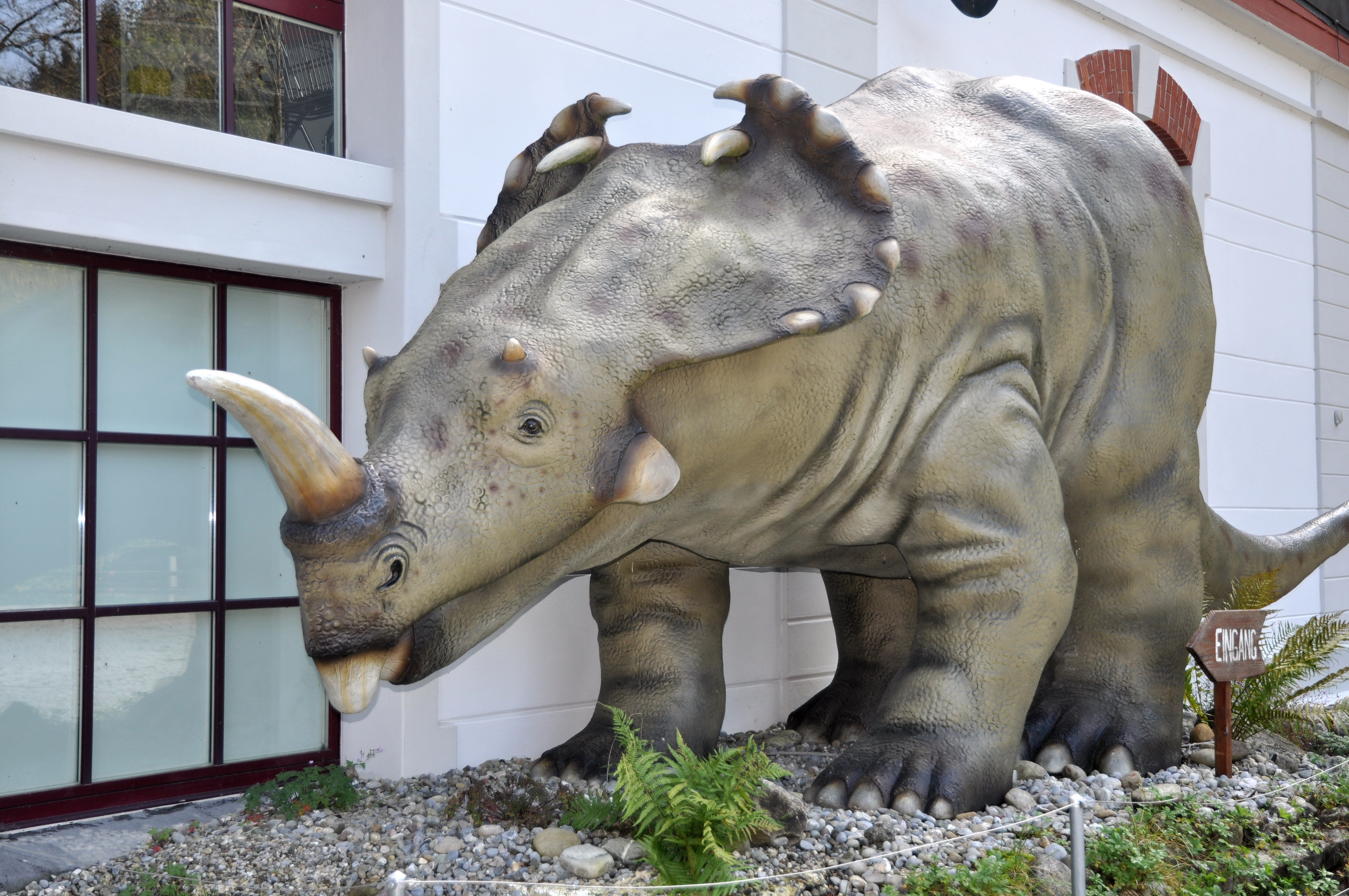
Centrosaurus replica.

== History ==
Hans-Jakob Siber, a mineral and fossil dealer, started in 1977 to exhibit temporarily a fossilized giant turtle from four and a half meters in length at his annual special show in Aathal, and was featuring the eight-meter-long skeleton of an Edmontosaurus four years later. In 1992 the collection was expanded and in 1993 the Sauriermuseum Aathal in the current building was opened. The family-owned company Siber + Siber supported the funding of the further activities.

== Museum and excavations ==
=== Museum ===
The former building of the Baumwollspinnerei Streiff & Cie weaving mill in Aathal was built in 1903 and houses the museum on about 4,500 square metres (48,000 ft^{2}), including the outside park on the surrounding property. The focus is on the museum's own excavations and original dinosaur bones, 19 special exhibitions and subsequently integrated new finds. A shop, a cafeteria and a park for children (Dino-Gardino) are sections of the museum. Among around 645 exhibits, there are skeletons, reproductions and originals finds of Stegosaurus, Ankylosaurs, Pterosaurs, 'featured' Dinosaurs, Archaeopteryx eggs and embryos and footprints, as well as meteorites and minerals of Siber + Siber.

The collection includes 10 skeletons being finds from excavations by the museum's team, 10 further original skeletons from Dino, air and marine saurians, 19 detached skeleton fossil dinosaur replicas as well as 31 life-size dinosaur models and 42 replicas of dinosaurs and dinosaur skulls. In 2012 there were 437 guided tours, of which about three hundred for school classes, and since 1992 about 1,571,012 visitors.

The staff of the museum consists of approximately 33 employees, of which six are members of the paleontological-scientific team.

=== Excavations ===
Beginning in the early 1990s, Hans-Jakob Siber and his team perform excavations on the Howe Ranch in the upper Jurassic Morrison Formation, and since 2010 in the Dana-Quarry, Ten Sleep, Big Horn Basin, Wyoming, USA. Skeletons are recovered and subsequently dissected, mounted and exhibited in Aathal. The excavation technique is presented in the museum, and the taxidermists may be seen at work in the so-called Schaupräparatorium.

== Facilities ==
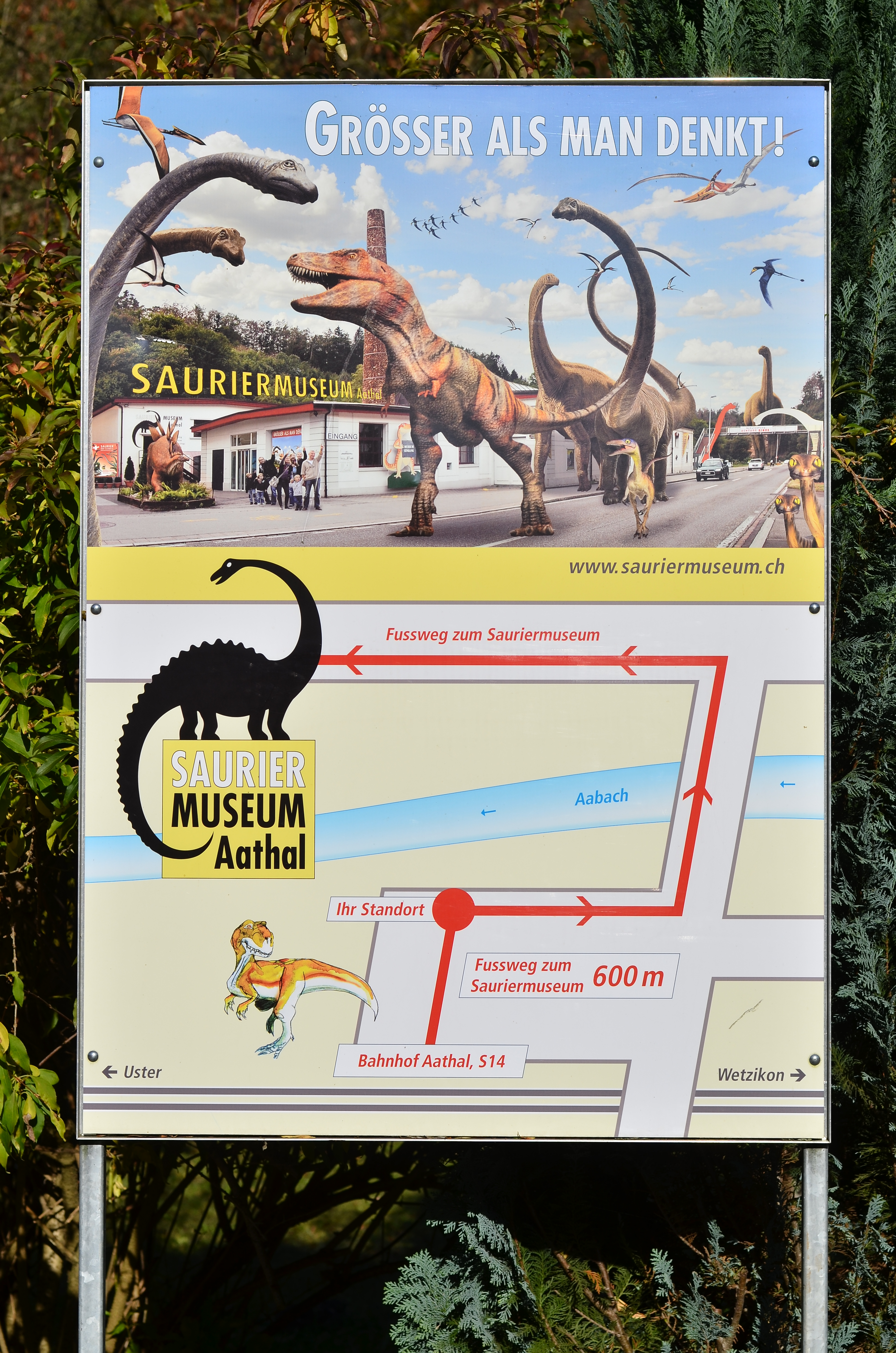
Information board at the Aathal station.

Public transportation to the nearby Aathal railway station is provided by the half-hourly S14 service of the Zurich S-Bahn. The museum is located about 600 metres (2,000 ft) north of the station, in direction towards Uster.

The museum is closed on Mondays. Afterhours visits are available by appointment, as well as guided tours for groups.

== Cultural heritage of national importance ==
In the Swiss inventory of cultural property of national and regional significance, the museum respectively the Baumwollspinnerei Streiff & Cie building is listed as a Class A object of national importance.

== See also ==
- List of museums in Switzerland
- Natural History Museum of the University of Zurich
