= Seegräben =

- Municipality
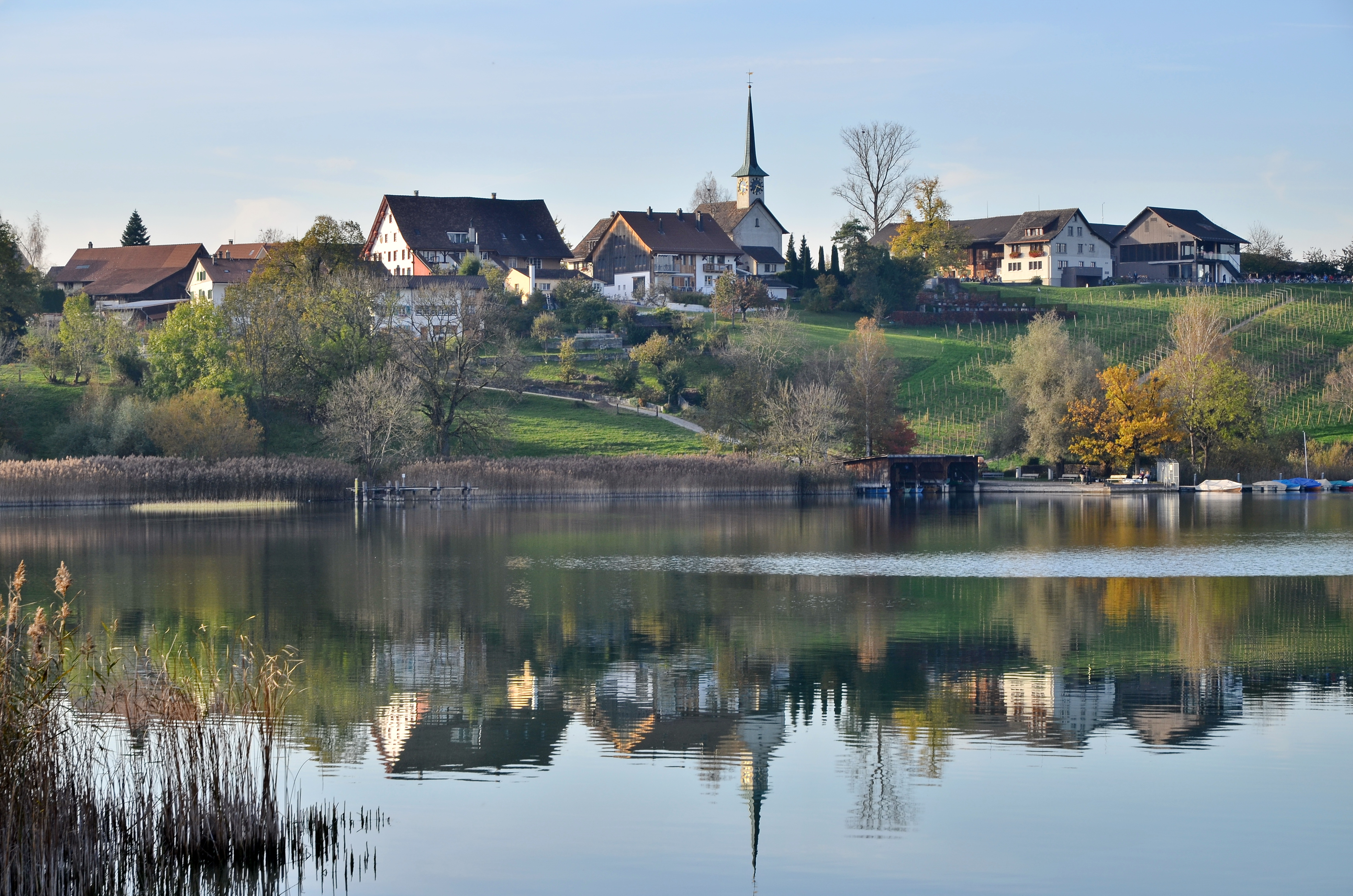

- Flag Coat of arms
- Location of Seegräben
- Location within Switzerland Location within Canton of Zurich
- Coordinates: 47°21′N 8°46′E
- Country: Switzerland
- Canton: Zurich
- District: Hinwil

Area
  - Total: 3.77 km^{2} (1.46 sq mi)
- Elevation (Church Seegräben): 561 m (1,841 ft)

Population (December 2020)
  - Total: 1,427
  - Density: 379/km^{2} (980/sq mi)
- Time zone: UTC+01:00 (CET)
  - Summer (DST): UTC+02:00 (CEST)
- Postal code: 8607
- SFOS number: 119
- ISO 3166 code: CH-ZH
- Localities: Aathal, Aathal-Seegräben, Aretshalden, Sack, Ottenhausen, Wagenburg
- Surrounded by: Mönchaltorf, Pfäffikon, Uster, Wetzikon
- Website: www.seegraeben.ch

Seegräben (German pronunciation: [ˈzeːˌɡrɛːbn̩]) is a village and a municipality in the district of Hinwil in the canton of Zürich in Switzerland. Besides the village of Seegräben itself, the municipality also includes the settlements of Aathal, Aathal-Seegräben, Aretshalden, Ottenhausen, Sack and Wagenburg.

== Geography ==
Aerial view from 300 m by Walter Mittelholzer (1919)

Seegräben is the smallest municipality in the district of Hinwil. It lies on the western shore of Pfäffikersee lake, and the municipality includes part of the lake and of the Robenhauser Ried, a wetland nature reserve of national importance. It also includes part of the Aathal valley, and the settlements of Aathal, Aathal-Seegräben, Aretshalden, Ottenhausen, Sack, Seegräben and Wagenburg.

Seegräben has an area of 3.8 km^{2} (1.5 sq mi). Of this area, 49.9% is used for agricultural purposes, while 15.4% is forested. Of the rest of the land, 15.6% is settled (buildings or roads) and the remainder (19.1%) is non-productive (rivers, glaciers or mountains). In 1996 housing and buildings made up 10.4% of the total area, while transportation infrastructure made up the rest (5.3%). Of the total unproductive area, water (streams and lakes) made up 10.4% of the area. As of 2007 12.7% of the total municipal area was undergoing some type of construction.

== Demographics ==
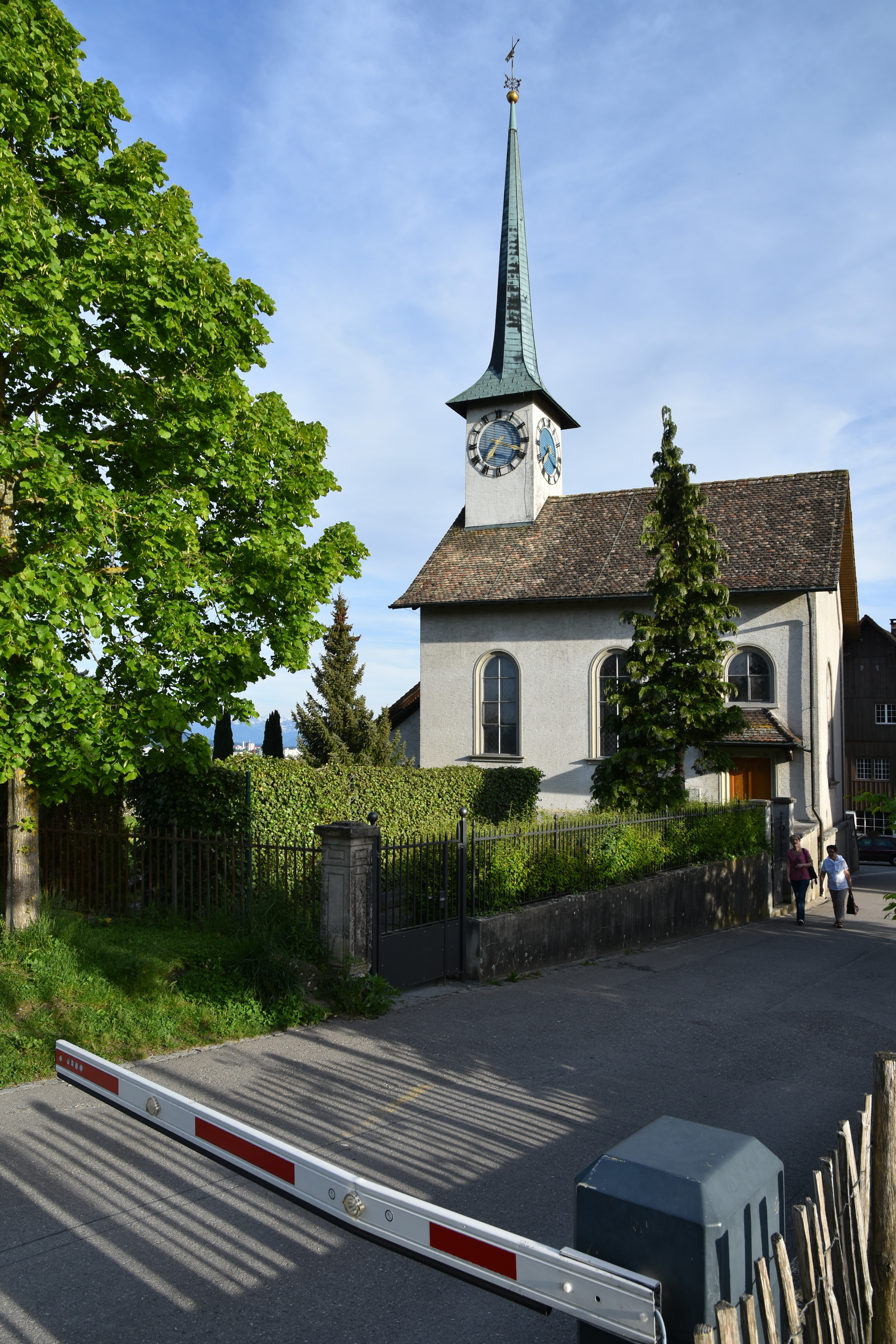
Reformed church as seen from Jucker Farm

Seegräben has a population (as of 31 December 2020) of 1,427. As of 2007, 14.6% of the population was made up of foreign nationals. As of 2008 the gender distribution of the population was 51% male and 49% female. Over the last 10 years the population has grown at a rate of 0.1%. Most of the population (as of 2000) speaks German (89.8%), with Turkish being second most common (2.0%) and Spanish being third (1.6%).

In the 2019 Swiss parliamentary elections the most popular party was the SVP which received 34.41% of the vote.The next four most popular parties were the GPS (15.91%), the SPS (15.7%), the GLP (12.32%) and the FDP (11.74%).

The age distribution of the population (as of 2000) is children and teenagers (0–19 years old) make up 28.2% of the population, while adults (20–64 years old) make up 63.3% and seniors (over 64 years old) make up 8.4%. In Seegräben about 81.1% of the population (between age 25-64) have completed either non-mandatory upper secondary education or additional higher education (either university or a Fachhochschule). There are 491 households in Seegräben.

Seegräben has an unemployment rate of 2.01%. As of 2005, there were 52 people employed in the primary economic sector and about 16 businesses involved in this sector. 24 people are employed in the secondary sector and there are 9 businesses in this sector. 227 people are employed in the tertiary sector, with 39 businesses in this sector. As of 2007 49.1% of the working population were employed full-time, and 50.9% were employed part-time.

As of 2008 there were 309 Catholics and 610 Protestants in Seegräben. In the 2000 census, religion was broken down into several smaller categories. From the 2000 census, 53.6% were some type of Protestant, with 49.8% belonging to the Swiss Reformed Church and 3.8% belonging to other Protestant churches. 24.9% of the population were Catholic. Of the rest of the population, 0% were Muslim, 6.2% belonged to another religion (not listed), 2% did not give a religion, and 13.2% were atheist or agnostic.

== Aathal Dinosaur Museum ==
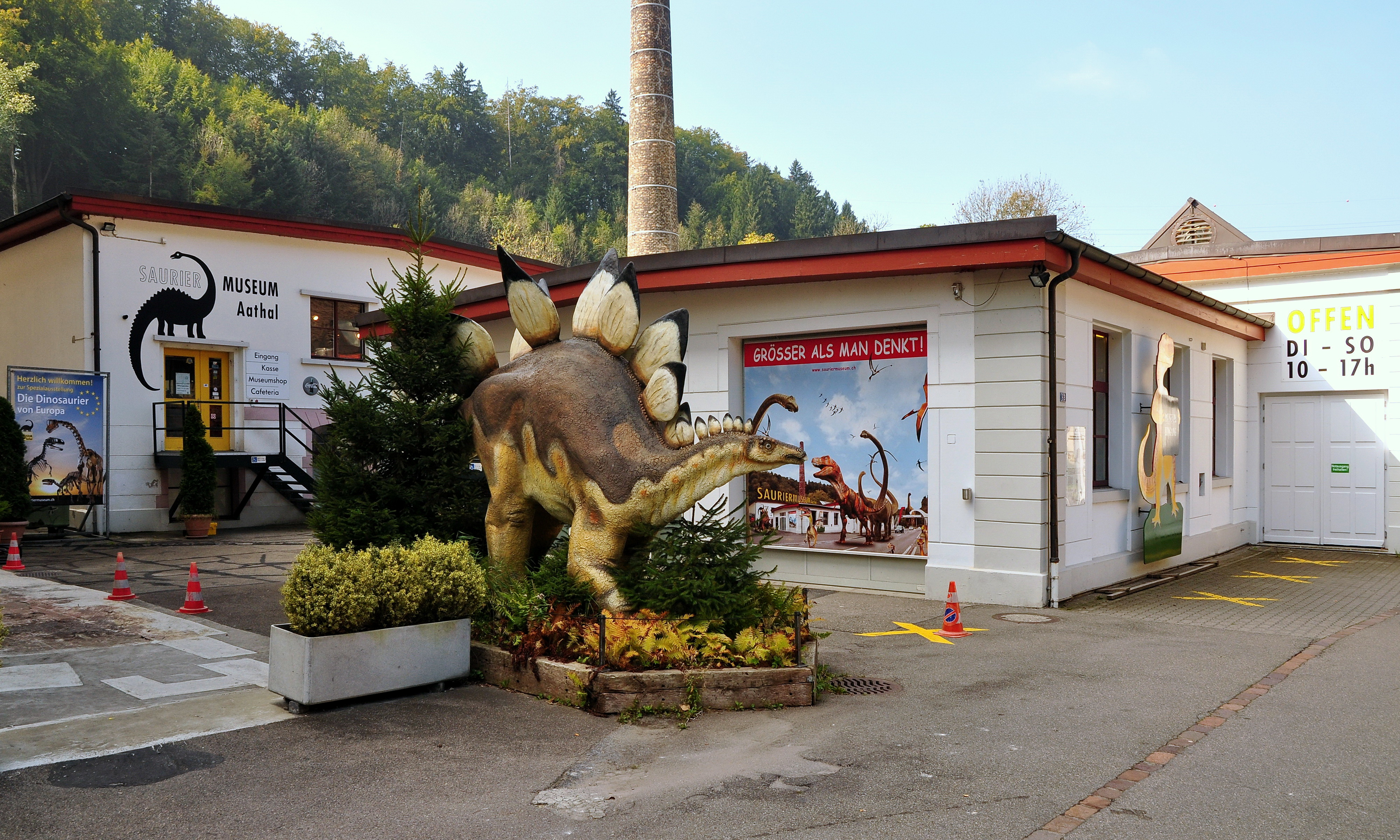
Aathal Dinosaur Museum

The Aathal Dinosaur Museum contains a collection of dinosaur skeletons which were unearthed by Hans-Jakob Siber and his team in the US state of Wyoming. Additionally they have a large reproductions of skeleton that were found by Robert Gaston and his team in Utah. The museum also includes exhibits on dinosaur eggs, foot prints, presence in movies and dinosaurs from Switzerland. The collection includes 10 skeletons being finds from excavations by the museum's team, 10 further original skeletons from Dino, air and marine saurians, 19 detached skeleton fossil dinosaur replicas as well as 31 life-size dinosaur models and 42 replicas of dinosaurs and dinosaur skulls. In 2012 there were 437 guided tours, of which about three hundred for school classes, and since 1992 about 1,571,012 visitors.

== Jucker Farm ==
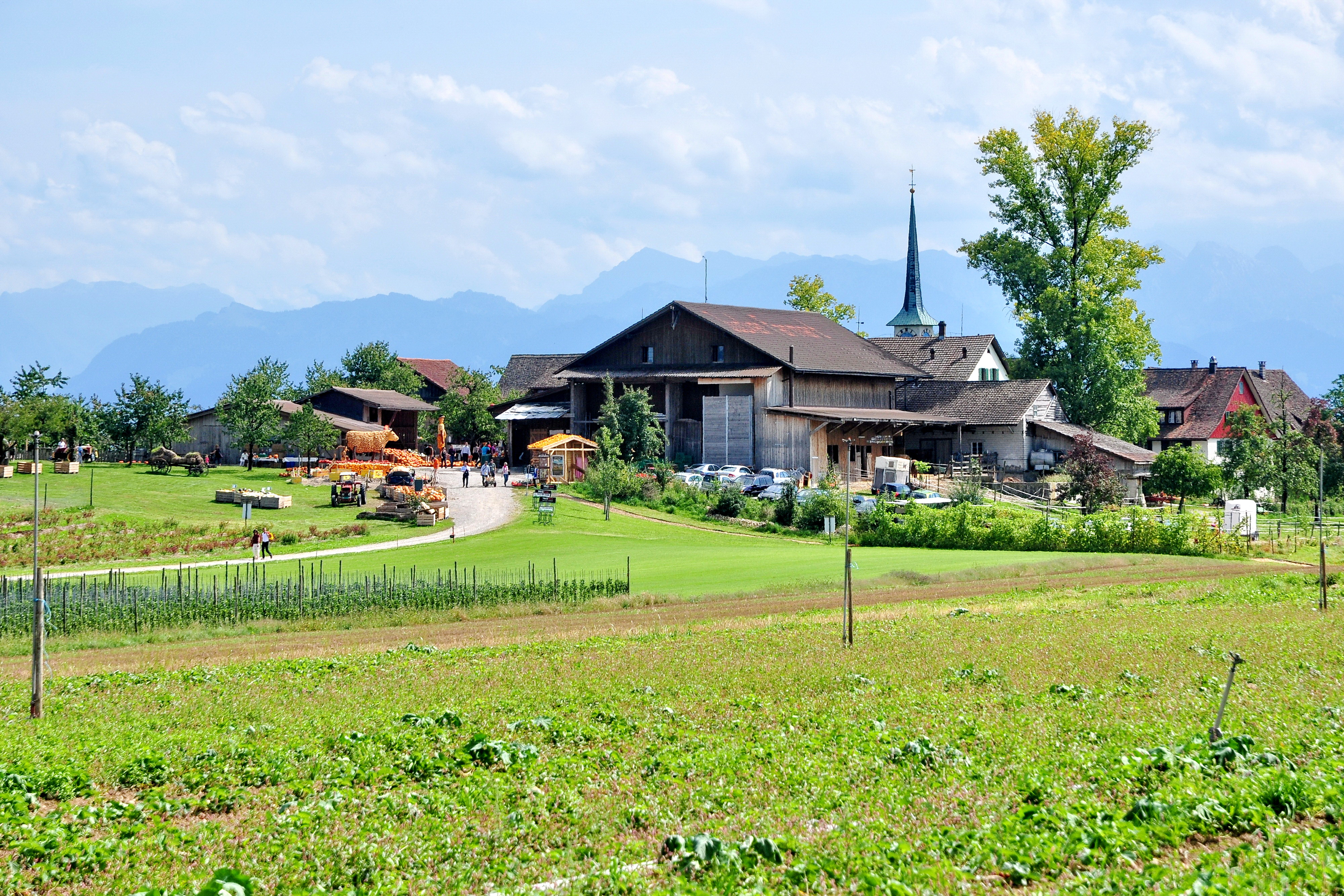
so-called Juchhof of Jucker Farm in Seegräben

Jucker Farm is an agrotourism company, agriculture producer and distributor, that operates three farm estates including restaurants and three farm shops. Based in Seegräben, Jucker Farm is known for the agricultural events, among them the biggest pumpkin festival in Switzerland, and attracts up to 300,000 visitors a year. It is also the most important pumpkin producer respectively distributor in Switzerland.

== Transportation ==
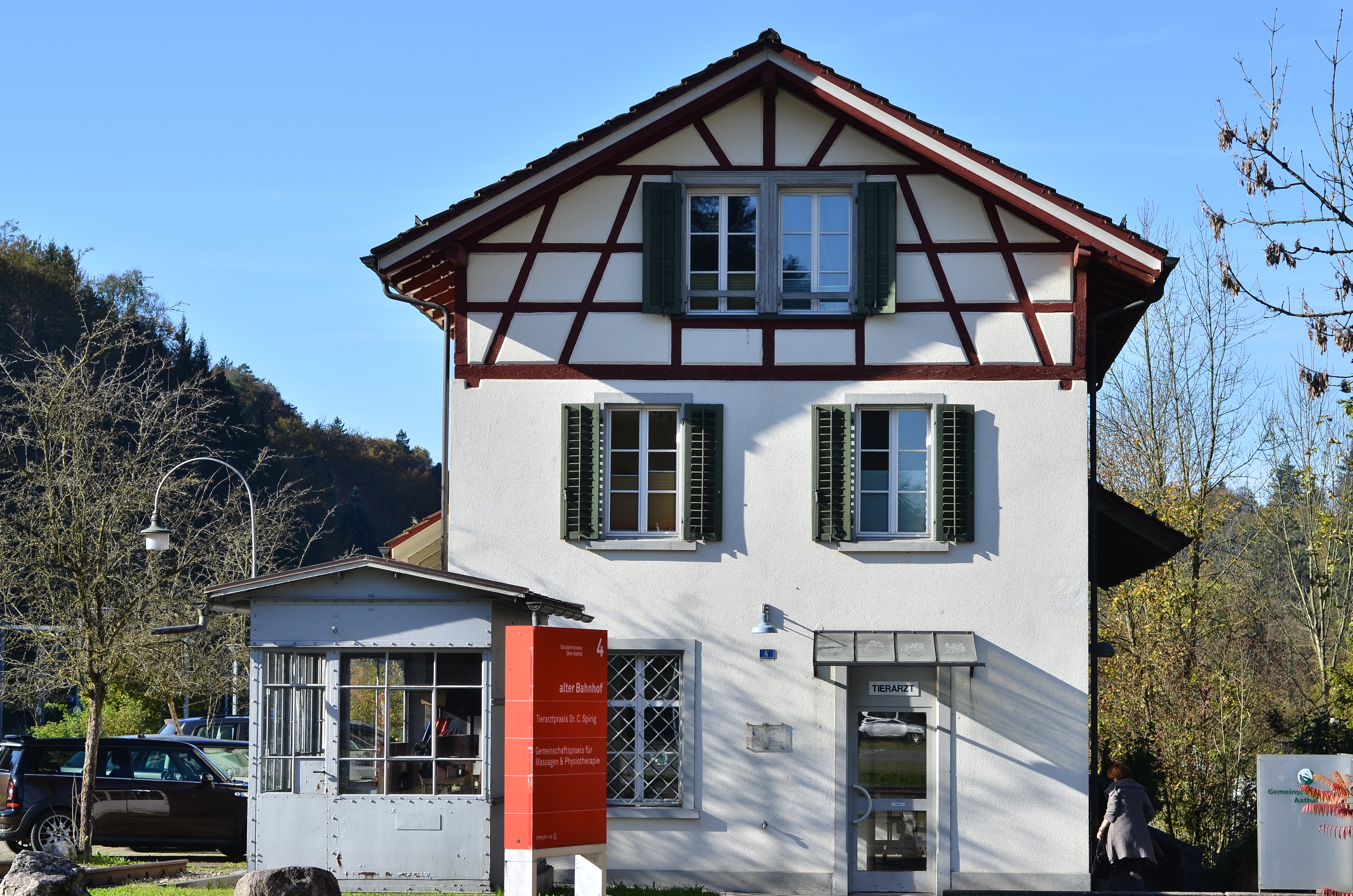
former railway station building

Aathal railway station is a stop of the Zürich S-Bahn on the line S14. Its train station is a 26 minute ride from Zürich Hauptbahnhof. During peak season, there is also a shuttle-bus between the Aathal railway station and Jucker Farm situated on Pfäffikersee lake shore in Seegräben.

== Notable people ==
- Jakob Messikommer (1828–1917), pioneer of wetland archaeology, researched the prehistoric settlement Wetzikon–Robenhausen at Robenhausen
