= Uster railway station =

Railway station in Uster, Switzerland

Uster
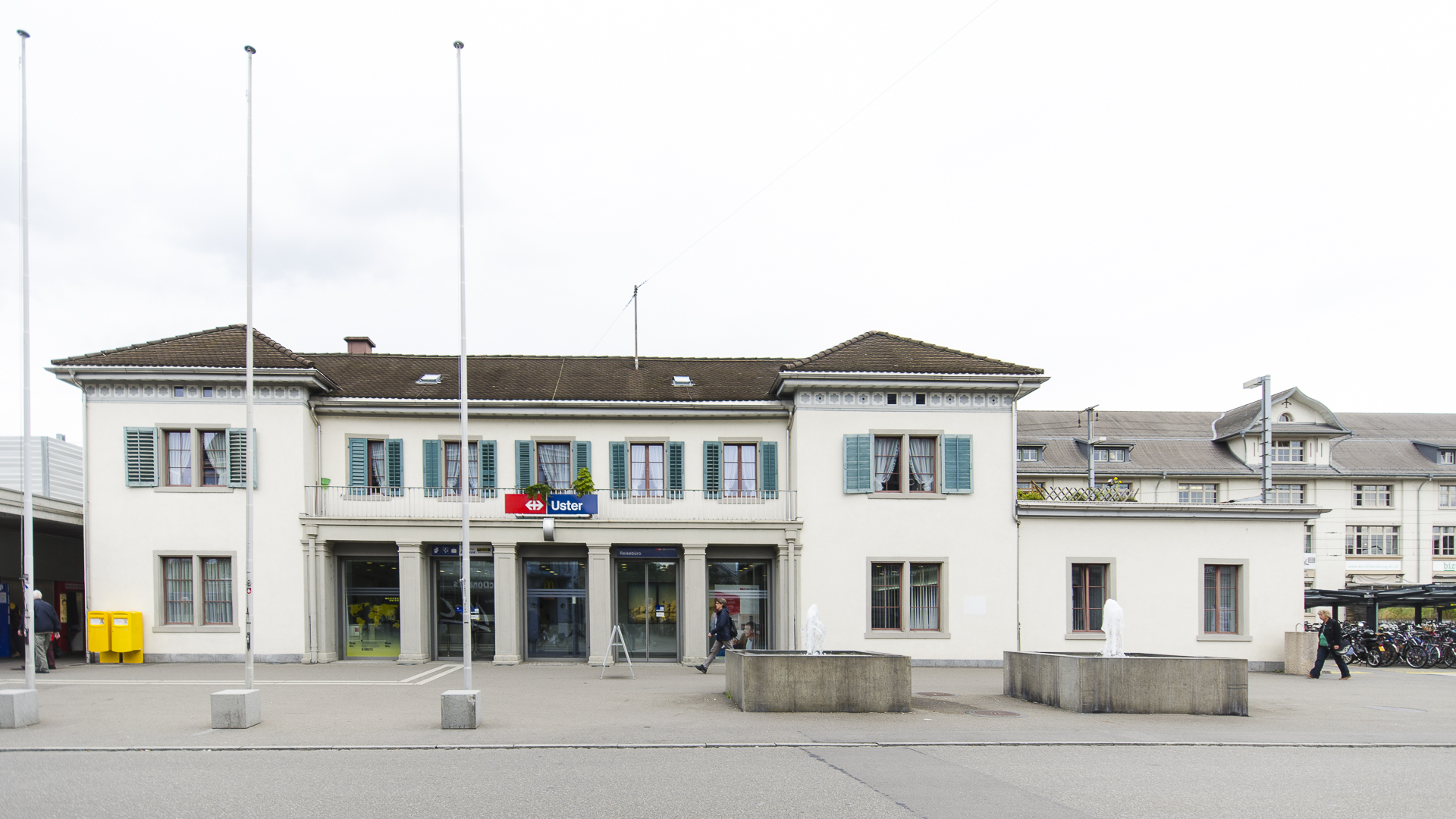
- The station building in 2013

General information
- Location: Uster, Zurich; Switzerland
- Coordinates: 47.350396°N 8.718681°E
- Elevation: 464 m (1,522 ft)
- Owner: Swiss Federal Railways
- Operator: Swiss Federal Railways
- Line: Wallisellen–Uster–Rapperswil
- Platforms: 1 island platform, 1 side platform
- Tracks: 3
- Connections: Zurich Transport Network (ZVV)
- Bus: PostAuto lines 827 830; VBG line 725; VZO lines 811 812 813 816 817 818 842 845

Other information
- Fare zone: 131 (ZVV)

History
- Rebuilt: 2018

Passengers
- 2025: 25,500 per day (SBB)
- Rank: 29 out of 1,095

Services
Preceding station	Zurich S-Bahn	Following station
Zürich Stadelhofen towards Zug	S5	Wetzikon towards Pfäffikon SZ
Nänikon-Greifensee towards Schaffhausen	S9	Terminus
Nänikon-Greifensee towards Affoltern am Albis	S14	Aathal towards Hinwil
Zürich Stadelhofen towards Niederweningen	S15	Wetzikon towards Rapperswil
Zürich Stadelhofen towards Knonau	SN5 Limited service	Aathal towards Pfäffikon SZ
Nänikon-Greifensee towards Bülach	SN9 Limited service	Terminus
Location
- Location within Switzerland Location within Canton of Zurich

Uster is a railway station in the canton of Zurich, Switzerland, situated in the city of Uster and within fare zone 131 of the Zürcher Verkehrsverbund (ZVV). The station is located on the Wallisellen to Uster and Rapperswil railway line.

== Services ==
Uster railway station is served by Zurich S-Bahn routes S5, S9, and S15, operating via Zürich Stadelhofen, and by route S14, operating via Wallisellen and Zürich Oerlikon. The S9 terminates at Uster, whilst the S14 continues to Hinwil, and the S5 and S15 both continue to Pfäffikon SZ and Rapperswil, respectively. During weekends, there are also two nighttime S-Bahn services (SN5, SN9) offered by ZVV.

Summary of all S-Bahn services:

- Zurich S-Bahn:
  - S5: half-hourly service to Zug via Zürich HB, and to Pfäffikon SZ via Rapperswil.
  - S9: half-hourly service to Rafz or Schaffhausen via Zürich HB.
  - S14: half-hourly service to Affoltern am Albis via Wallisellen and Zürich HB, and to Hinwil via Wetzikon.
  - S15: half-hourly service to Niederweningen via Zürich HB, and to Rapperswil.
  - Nighttime S-Bahn (only during weekends):
    - SN5: hourly service between Knonau and Pfäffikon SZ (via Stettbach and Zürich HB).
    - SN9: hourly service to Bülach via Stettbach and Zürich HB.

The station is additionally served by buses of Verkehrsbetriebe Glattal (VBG), Verkehrsbetriebe Zürichsee und Oberland (VZO) and PostAuto.

== Gallery ==
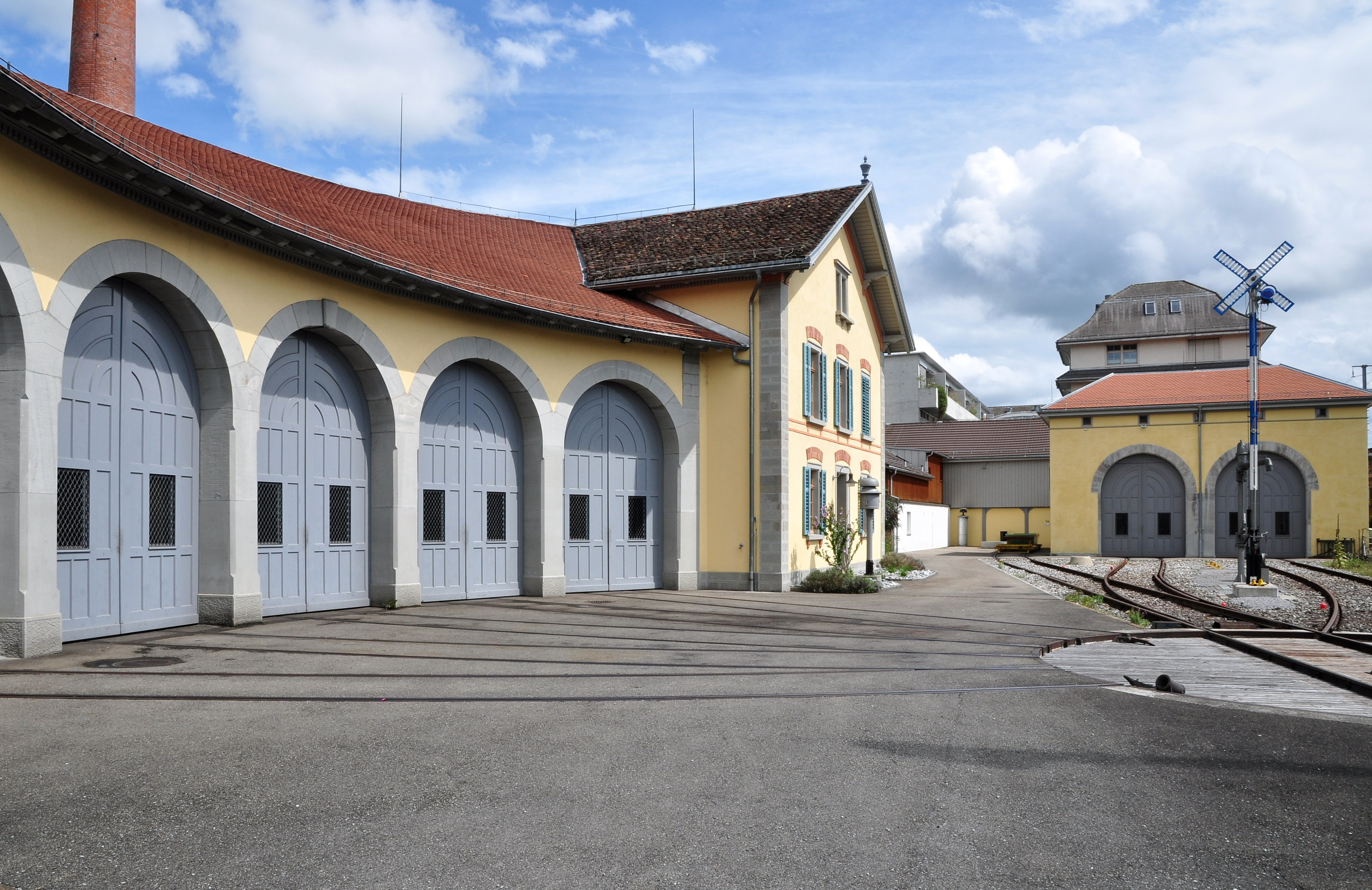
The restored Lokremise, showing both engine sheds

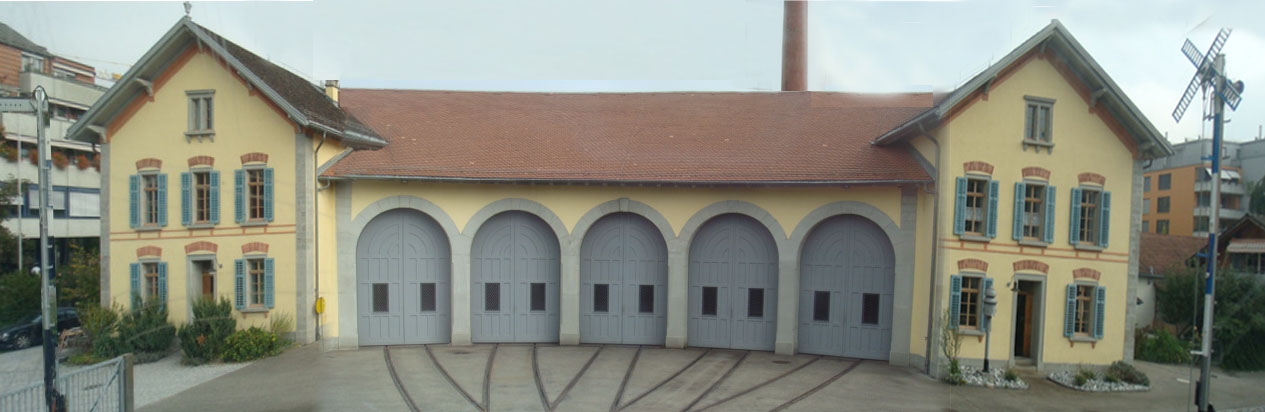
The roundhouse of the Lokremise, showing both flanking houses

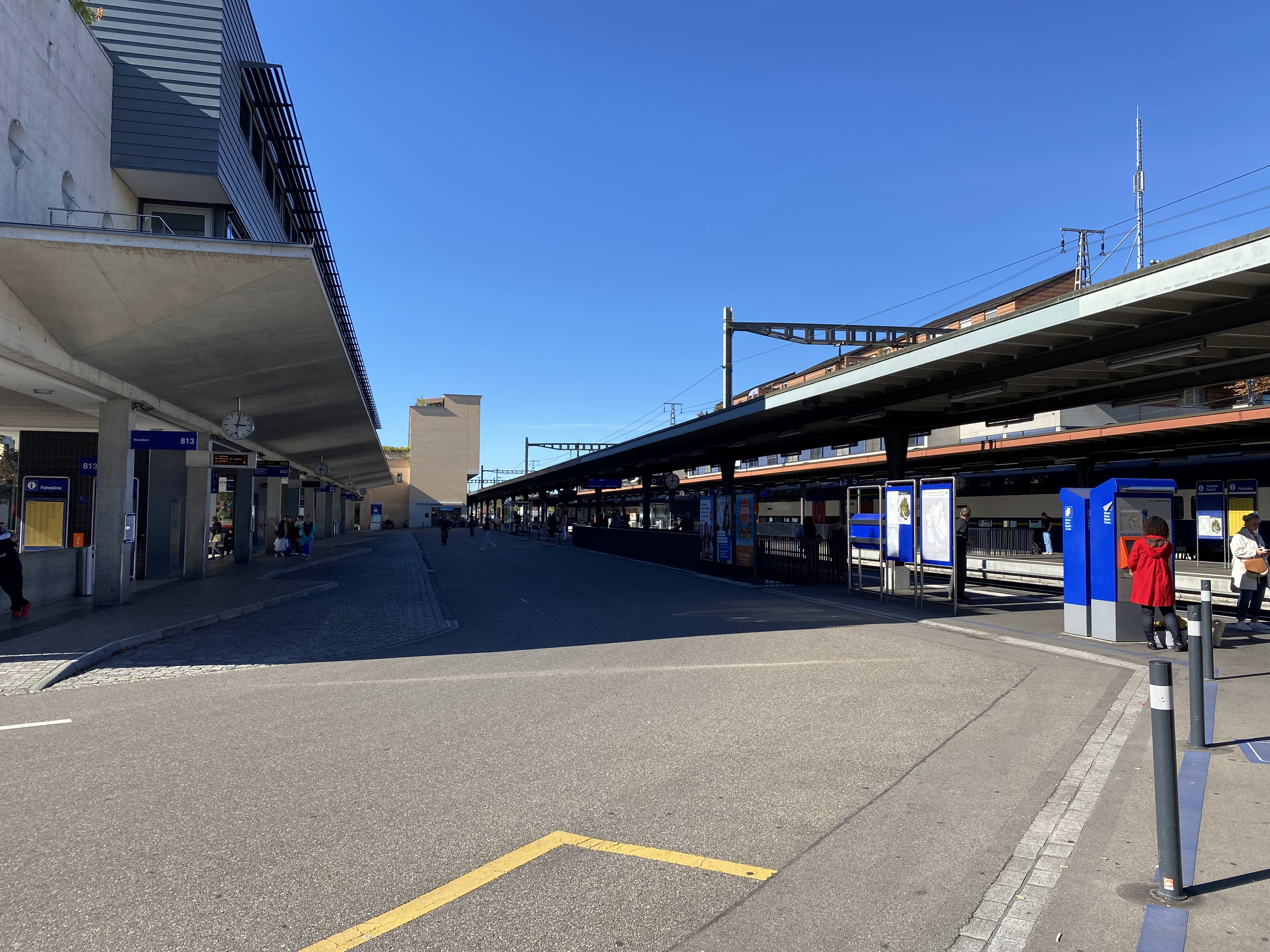
The adjacent bus station

== History ==
Between 1909 and 1949, Uster station was also the terminus of the Uster-Oetwil-Bahn (UOeB), a metre gauge electric tramway that linked Uster with Esslingen and Oetwil am See in the Zürcher Oberland.

An unusual feature of Uster railway station is the historic Lokremise (lit. 'engine shed'). This comprises two separate buildings, a simple shed from 1856 and a partial roundhouse from 1857, arranged around a turntable. The roundhouse is flanked by houses on either side. The whole ensemble has been designated as a historical monument since 1985, and has been restored to its original condition. It is inscribed on the Swiss Inventory of Cultural Property of National Significance. It is owned by the Canton of Zurich, and used by the Dampfbahn-Verein Zürcher Oberland (DVZO) to maintain its collection of historic rolling stock.

In 2018, parts of the Uster station were rebuilt so that barrier-free access to all trains of the Zurich S-Bahn is possible.

== See also ==
- Rail transport in Switzerland
