= Wetzikon railway station =

Swiss rail station in Zürich

Wetzikon
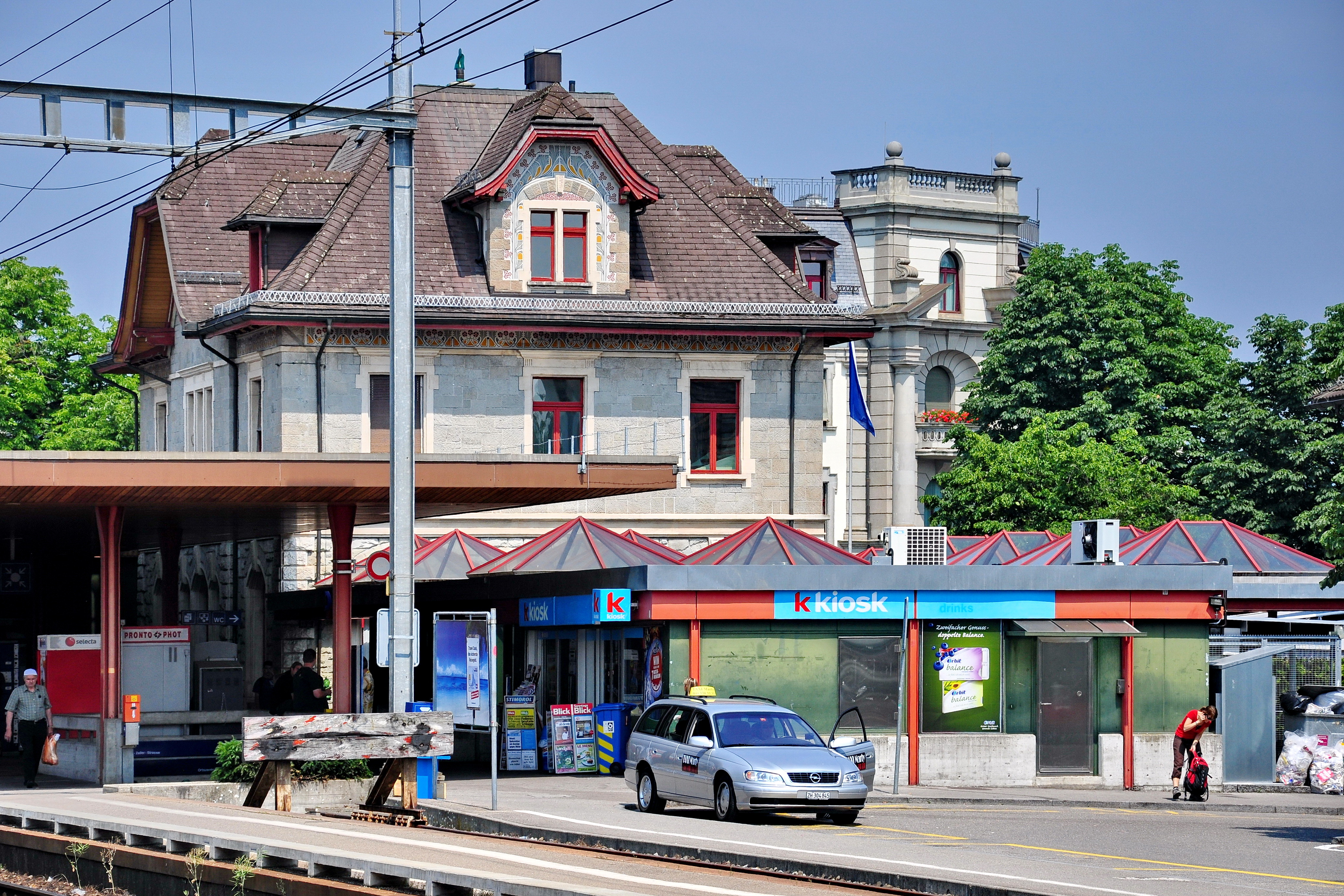
- The station in 2010

General information
- Location: Poststrasse, Wetzikon, Canton of Zürich, Switzerland
- Coordinates: 47.316978°N 8.79227°E
- Elevation: 532 m (1,745 ft)
- Owner: Swiss Federal Railways
- Operator: Swiss Federal Railways
- Line: Wallisellen–Uster–Rapperswil line Effretikon–Hinwil line
- Platforms: 2 island platforms, 1 side platform
- Tracks: 5
- Connections: Zurich Transport Network (ZVV)
- Bus: PostAuto line 859; VZO lines 850 851 852 857 858 862 869 883

Other information
- Fare zone: 132 (ZVV)

Passengers
- 2025: 26,000 per day (SBB)
- Rank: 28 out of 1,095

Services
Preceding station	Zurich S-Bahn	Following station
Kempten towards Bülach	S3	Terminus
Uster towards Zug	S5	Bubikon towards Pfäffikon SZ
Aathal towards Affoltern am Albis	S14	Hinwil Terminus
Uster towards Niederweningen	S15	Bubikon towards Rapperswil
Aathal towards Knonau	SN5 Limited service	Bubikon towards Pfäffikon SZ
Location
- Location within Switzerland Location within Canton of Zurich

Wetzikon is a railway station in the municipality of Wetzikon in the Swiss canton of Zurich, situated in fare zone 132 of the Zürcher Verkehrsverbund (ZVV). It is a junction station located on the Wallisellen to Rapperswil via Uster and Effretikon to Hinwil railway lines, which converge to the north and south of the station.

== Services ==
Wetzikon is served by Zurich S-Bahn routes S5, S14 and S15, operating from Zurich via Uster, and by route S3, operating from Zurich via Effretikon. The S3 terminates at Wetzikon, whilst the S14 continues to Hinwil, and the S5 and S15 continue to Pfäffikon SZ and Rapperswil, respectively. During weekends, there is also a nighttime S-Bahn service (SN5) offered by ZVV.

Summary of all S-Bahn services:

- Zurich S-Bahn:
  - S3: half-hourly service to Hardbrücke (or Bülach during peak hour) via Effretikon and Zürich HB.
  - S5: half-hourly service to Zug via Zürich HB, and to Pfäffikon SZ via Rapperswil.
  - S14: half-hourly service to Affoltern am Albis via Zürich HB, and to Hinwil.
  - S15: half-hourly service to Niederweningen via Zürich HB, and to Rapperswil.
  - Nighttime S-Bahn (only during weekends):
    - SN5: hourly service between Knonau and Pfäffikon SZ (via Zürich HB).

The station is additionally served by buses of Verkehrsbetriebe Zürichsee und Oberland (VZO) and PostAuto.

== History ==
The station was opened in 1857, at the same time as the Uster to Rapperswil section of the Wallisellen to Rapperswil line. It became a junction station in 1876, when the Effretikon to Hinwil line opened.

In 1903, Wetzikon station also became the interchange point with the Wetzikon-Meilen-Bahn (WMB), a newly built metre gauge electric tramway that linked the area with Meilen on the shores of Lake Zurich. The WMB originally ran beyond Meilen station, to terminate at Kempten, but this section closed in 1939 leaving the station as the line's terminus. The WMB closed in 1950.

== See also ==
- Rail transport in Switzerland
