= Wallisellen–Uster–Rapperswil railway line =

Railway line in Switzerland

Wallisellen–Uster–Rapperswil
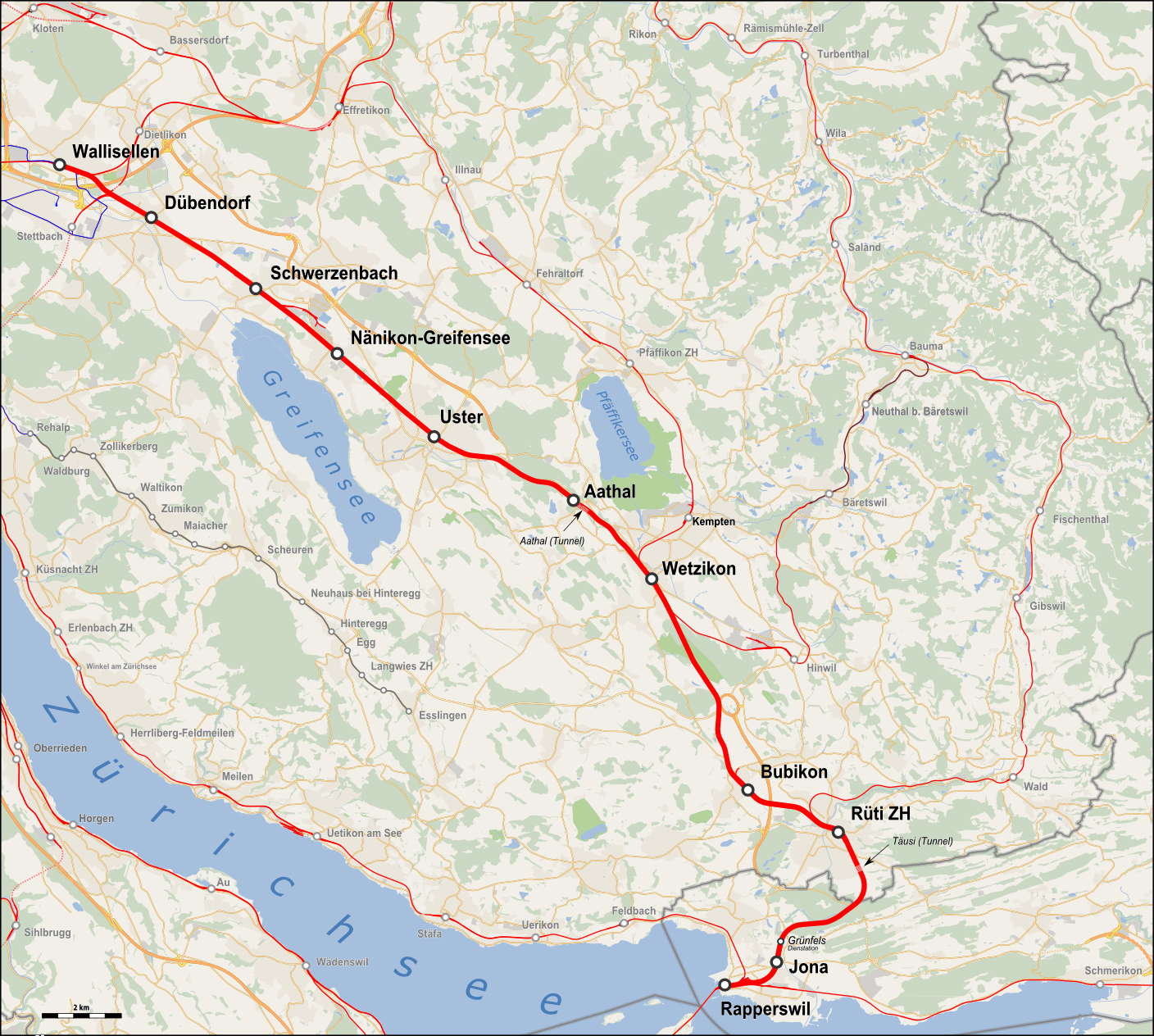

Overview
- Native name: Glatthalbahn

Service
- Route number: 740

Technical
- Track gauge: 1,435 mm (4 ft 8 1/2 in)
- Electrification: 15 kV 16.7 Hz AC
- Maximum incline: 1.7 %

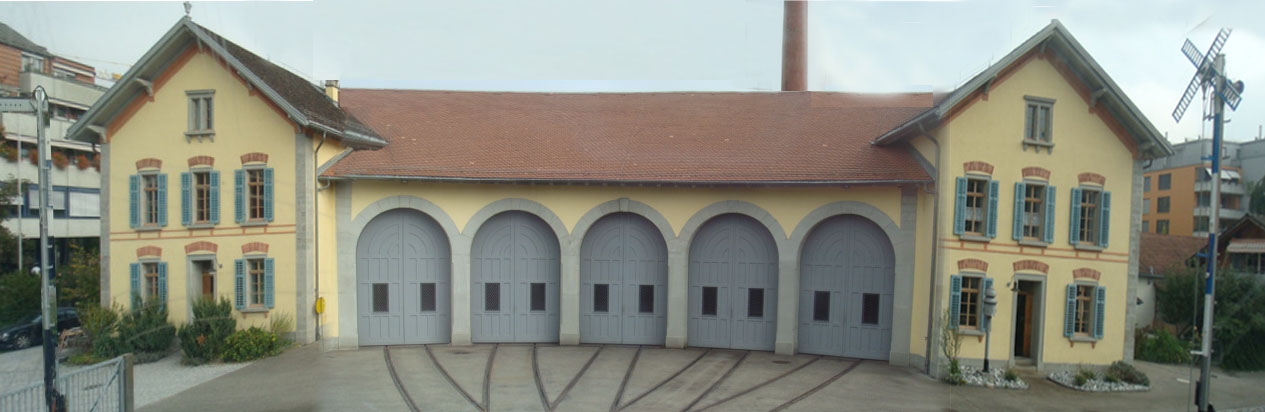
The preserved roundhouse at Uster

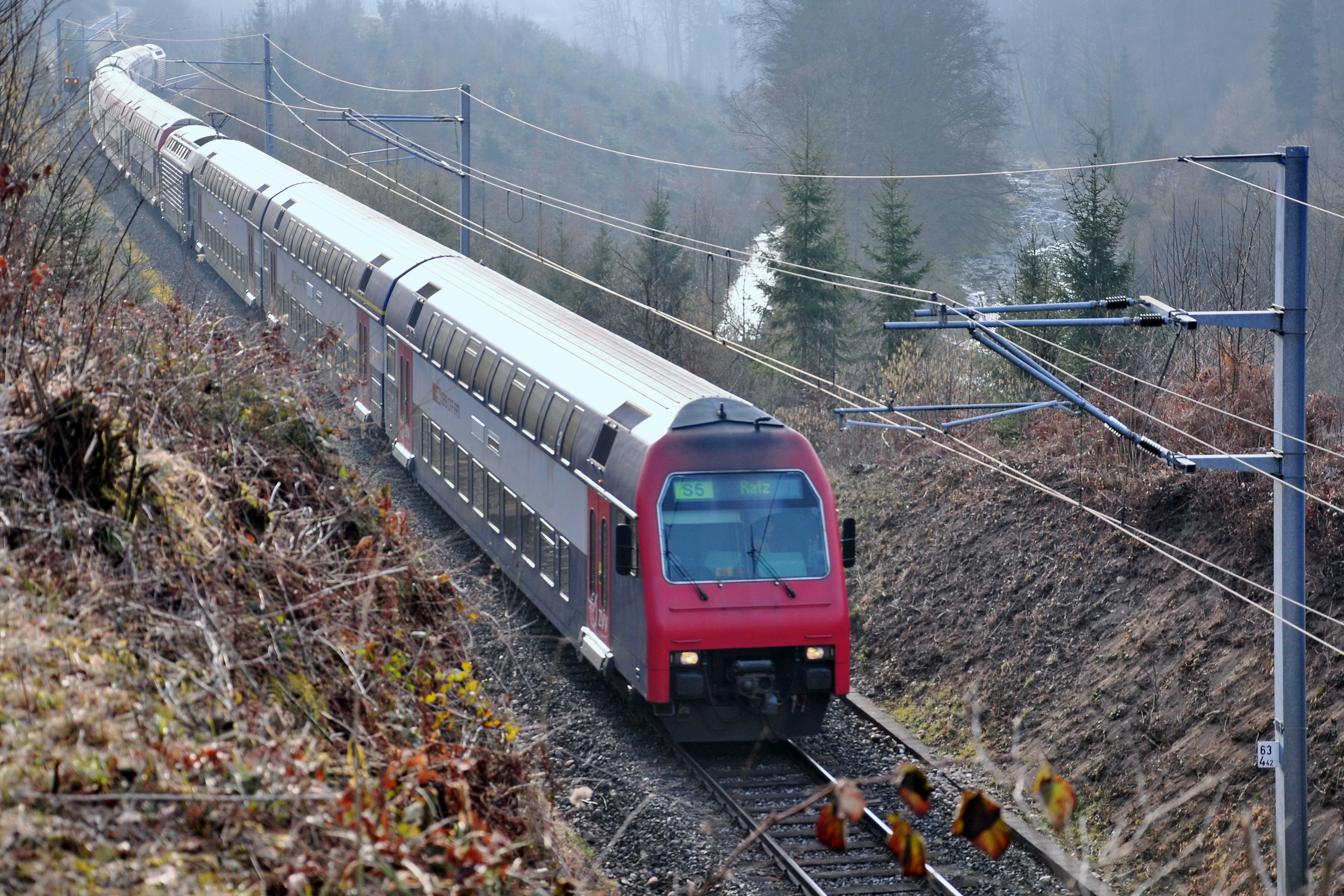
A train on the southern end of the line, near Jona

The Wallisellen–Uster–Rapperswil railway line is a railway line in the canton of Zürich in Switzerland. It is also known as the Glatthalbahn, Glatttalbahn or Glattalbahn (Gl-TB), although the latter name is now more commonly used to refer to the Stadtbahn Glattal, a nearby light rail system.

The line runs from Wallisellen, where it diverges from the Zürich–Winterthur line to Uster and Rapperswil. A second link from Zürich, via the Zürichberg Tunnel, joins the line just before Dübendorf, and both routes are used by through trains from Zürich. The line also has junctions with the Effretikon to Hinwil line, at Wetzikon, and the Tösstalbahn, at Rüti. At Rapperswil, it connects with the Lake Zurich right bank line, the Rapperswil to Ziegelbrücke line, and the Südostbahn over the Seedamm.

The name Glattalbahn is German for Glattal railway, or Glatt valley railway. The river Glatt is a tributary of the river Rhine flowing from Greifensee lake to Glattfelden in Switzerland.

== History ==
The original section of the railway line from Wallisellen to Uster was opened in 1856 by the Glatttalbahn company. That company was taken over by the Vereinigte Schweizerbahnen (VSB) one year later in 1857, and that company extended the line to Rapperswil. The VSB was in turn taken over by the Swiss Federal Railways (SBB) in 1902. The original roundhouse at Uster railway station is preserved.

At Bubikon, the Wallisellen to Rapperswil line was crossed by the former Uerikon to Bauma railway (UeBB). The section of this line from Bubikon in the direction of Bauma was closed in 1948 and little now remains. The line towards Uerikon was largely closed at the same time, but a short stretch is still in use as a siding.

== Operation ==
Today the line carries trains of the Zürich S-Bahn and freight traffic.

The line is double track from Wallisellen to Uster, and is then single track with shorter stretches of double track between Aathal and Wetzikon, Bubikon and Rüti, and Jona and Rapperswil.

Whilst no single S-Bahn line traverses the full length of the line from Wallisellen to Rapperswil, no fewer than six lines traverse some part of the line, providing a high frequency of service to many stations.

The following lines operate on sections of the line:

- S3 (Bülach–) Hardbrücke–Zürich HB–Effretikon–Wetzikon
- S5 Zug–Affoltern am Albis–Zürich HB–Uster–Wetzikon–Rapperswil–Pfäffikon SZ
- S8 Winterthur–Wallisellen–Oerlikon–Zürich HB–Thalwil–Pfäffikon SZ (–Ziegelbrücke)
- S9 (Schaffhausen–) Rafz–Hardbrücke–Zürich HB–Uster
- S14 Affoltern am Albis–Zürich HB–Oerlikon–Uster–Wetzikon–Hinwil
- S19 (Koblenz–Baden–) Dietikon–Zürich HB–Oerlikon–Effretikon (–Pfäffikon ZH )
- S15 Niederweningen–Hardbrücke–Zürich HB–Uster–Wetzikon–Rapperswil
- S26 Winterthur–Bauma–Rüti ZH

== See also ==
- List of railway companies in Switzerland
