= S14 (ZVV) =

Railway service in Switzerland

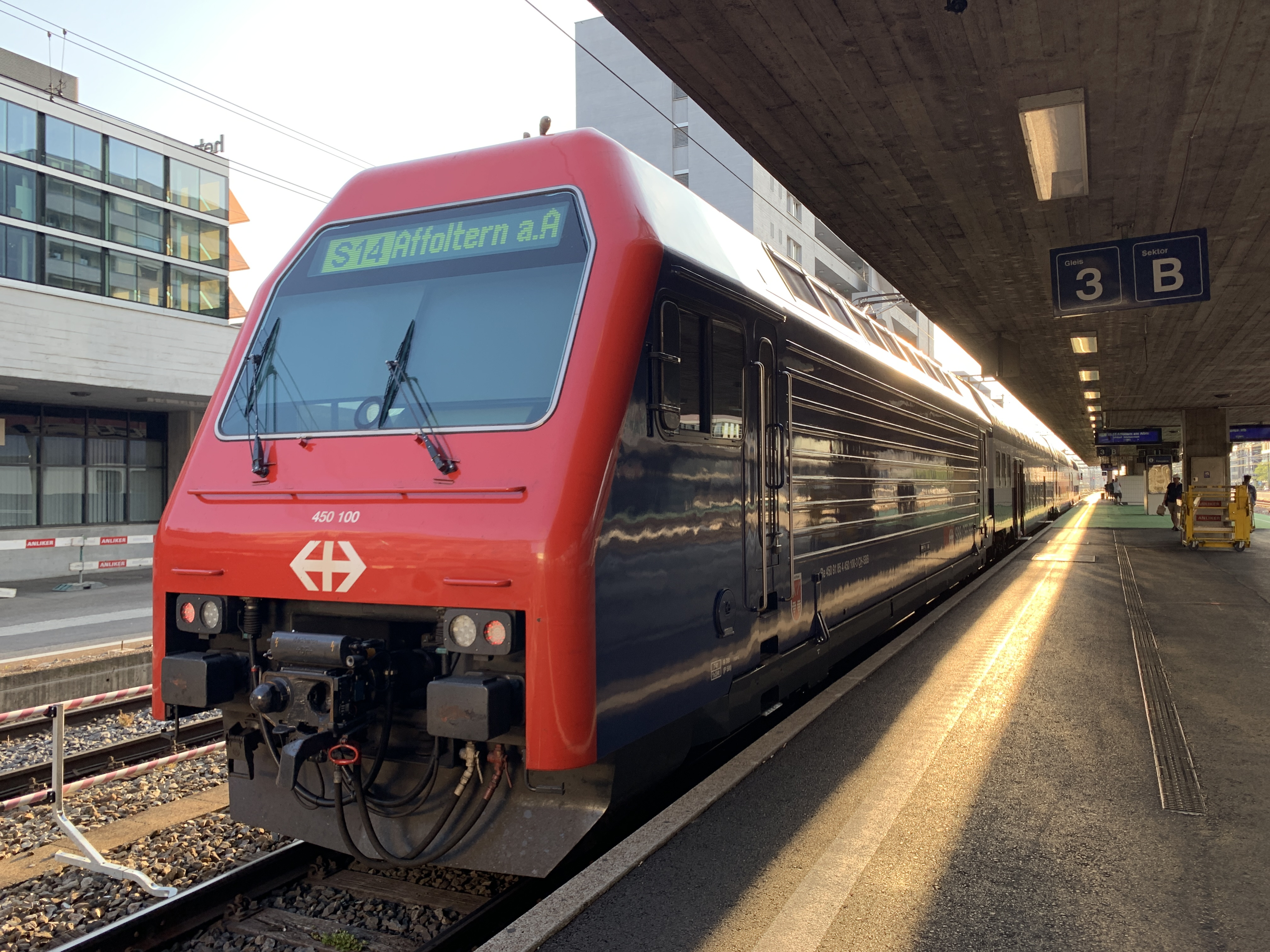
- An S14 train in Zürich Altstetten

Overview
- Status: Operational
- Locale: Zürich, Switzerland
- Termini: Affoltern am Albis; Hinwil
- Website: ZVV (in English)

Service
- Type: S-Bahn
- System: Zürich S-Bahn
- Operator(s): Zürcher Verkehrsverbund (ZVV)
- Rolling stock: Re 450 class + double-deck coaches

Technical
- Track gauge: 1,435 mm (4 ft 8 1/2 in)

Zürich S-Bahn network as of December 2018

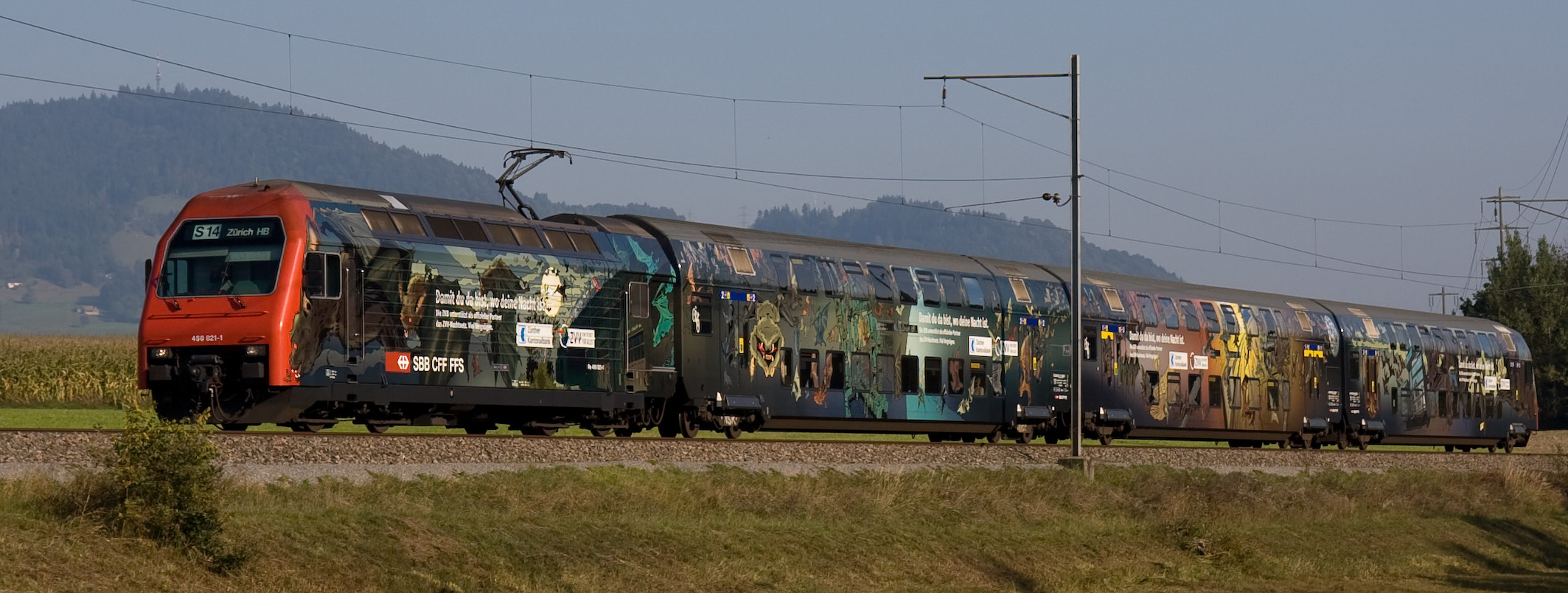
An S14 train with wrap advertising for the ZVV "nighttime network", just outside Wetzikon, 2008.

The S14 is a regional railway line of the Zürich S-Bahn on the Zürcher Verkehrsverbund (ZVV), Zürich transportation network, in the canton of Zürich, Switzerland.

At Zürich HB, trains of the S14 service usually depart from underground tracks (Gleis) 31–34 (Löwenstrasse station).

== Route ==
- S14 Affoltern am Albis–Zürich HB–Oerlikon–Uster–Wetzikon–Hinwil
  Operates non stop between Zürich Altstetten and Zürich HB.

The line runs from Affoltern am Albis to Zürich Hauptbahnhof, before continuing to Hinwil, the capital of the district of Hinwil in the Zürcher Oberland. It serves the following stations:

- Affoltern am Albis
- Hedingen
- Bonstetten-Wettswil
- Birmensdorf
- Urdorf Weihermatt
- Urdorf
- Zürich Altstetten
- Zurich Hauptbahnhof
- Zurich Oerlikon
- Wallisellen
- Dübendorf
- Schwerzenbach
- Nänikon-Greifensee
- Uster
- Aathal
- Wetzikon
- Hinwil

The service uses the Altstetten–Zürich–Oerlikon cross-city line, opened in 2015 and including the Weinberg Tunnel, between Altstetten and Oerlikon.

== Rolling stock ==
Initially, all services were operated by Re 450 class locomotives pushing or pulling double-deck passenger carriages. RABe 514 class multiple units began displacing the push-pull sets in 2008. As of the December 2022 timetable change, all services are operated with Re 450 locomotives and double-deck coaches.

== Scheduling ==
The train frequency is usually 30 minutes and the trip takes 70 minutes.

== History ==
Originally the S14 started in the terminal platforms at Zürich Hauptbahnhof, and ran via the Wipkingen Tunnel to Oerlikon and on to Hinwil. With the completion of the Altstetten–Zürich–Oerlikon cross-city line in 2015, it was diverted at Oerlikon to use the Weinberg Tunnel and the low-level through platforms of the Hauptbahnhof, before being extended to Affoltern am Albis to replace the S15 which was in turn diverted elsewhere. This diversion and extension means that the line no longer serves the railway stations of Wipkingen (on the original S14 route) and doesn't serve Hardbrücke (on the original S15 route).

== See also ==
- Rail transport in Switzerland
- List of railway stations in Zurich
- Public transport in Zurich
- ZVV fare zones
