= Albis Pass =

Mountain pass in Zurich, Switzerland

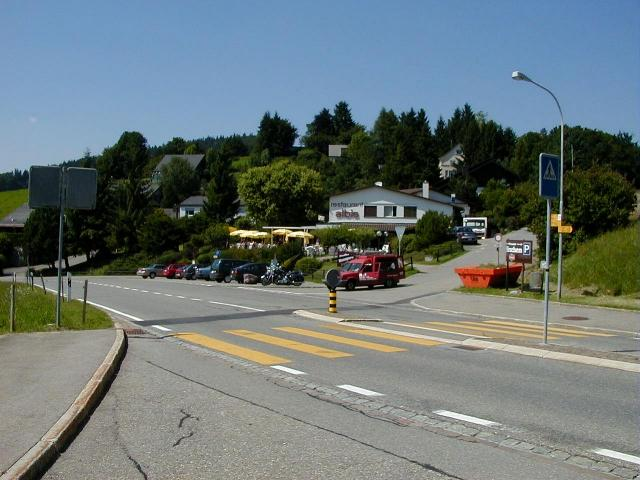
- Albis pass road
- Interactive map of Albis Pass
- Elevation: 793 metres (2,602 ft)

Third Approach
- Location: Langnau am Albis, Canton of Zurich, Switzerland
- Range: Albis
- Coordinates: 47°16′34″N 8°31′20″E

Albis Pass (el. 793 m or 2,602 ft) is a mountain pass in the Albis range in the canton of Zurich in Switzerland. It connects Langnau am Albis with the small village of Türlen on the Türlersee and, further on, Aeugst am Albis, Hausen am Albis, Mettmenstetten and Rifferswil. Other nearby passes across the same chain are Buechenegg to the north, and Schnabellücken, which is undeveloped except for a hiking trail, to the south. The eastern ramp and crest of the pass is in the municipality of Langnau, with the western ramp in Hausen.

The pass is first mentioned in 1492, when the Zurich Council made a decision on road maintenance. In past times it was regarded as an important route between Zurich and central Switzerland. In 1713, Zurich military authorities are recorded as regarding transport over the Albis Pass as being simpler and cheaper than going via Birmensdorf or Horgen. However the construction of the railway from Thalwil to Zug and later roads rendered the pass less important.

The road over the Albis pass is served hourly during daylight hours by a bus connecting Hausen am Albis to the train station in Thalwil. A walking trail to the north follows the ridge-line of the Albis range and leads to Buechenegg, Felsenegg and Uetliberg.
