= Buchenegg Pass =

Mountain pass in Zurich, Switzerland

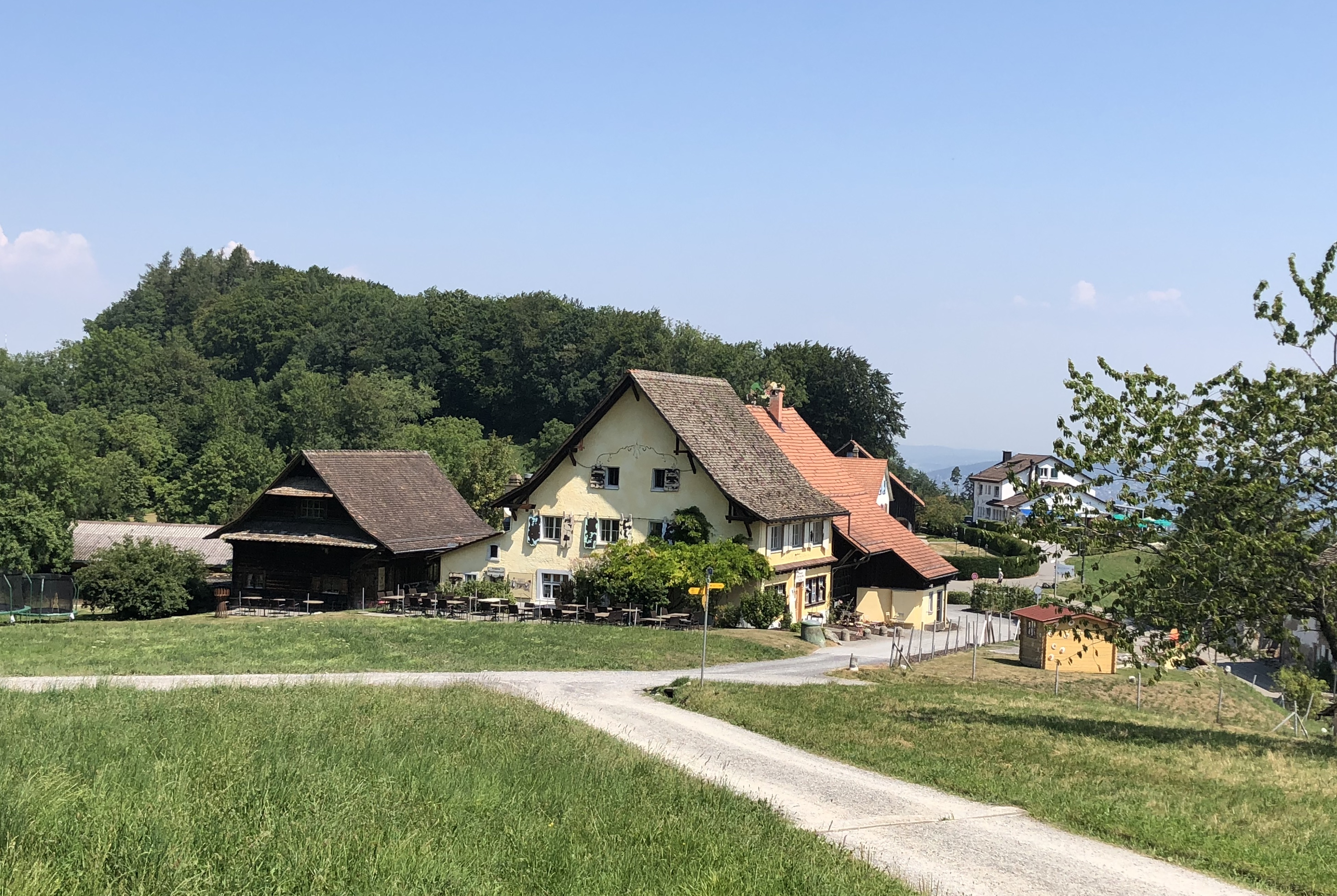
- Buchenegg Pass
- Interactive map of Buchenegg Pass
- Elevation: 786 metres (2,579 ft)

Third Approach
- Location: Stallikon, Canton of Zurich, Switzerland
- Coordinates: 47°17′44″N 8°30′28″E

Buchenegg Pass (el. 786 m or 2,579 ft) is a mountain pass in the Albis range in the canton of Zurich in Switzerland. It connects Langnau am Albis and Tägerst, on the road from Aeugst am Albis to Stallikon. The western ramp and crest of the pass is in the municipality of Stallikon, with the eastern ramp in Langnau. A walking trail follows the ridge-line of the Albis range and connects Buchenegg with Felsenegg and Uetliberg, to the north, and the Albis Pass to the south.
