= Felsenegg =

Mountain in Switzerland

Coordinates: 47°18′30.95″N 8°30′34.5″E

Felsenegg (el. 804 metres or 2,638 feet) is a vantage point in the canton of Zürich in Switzerland.

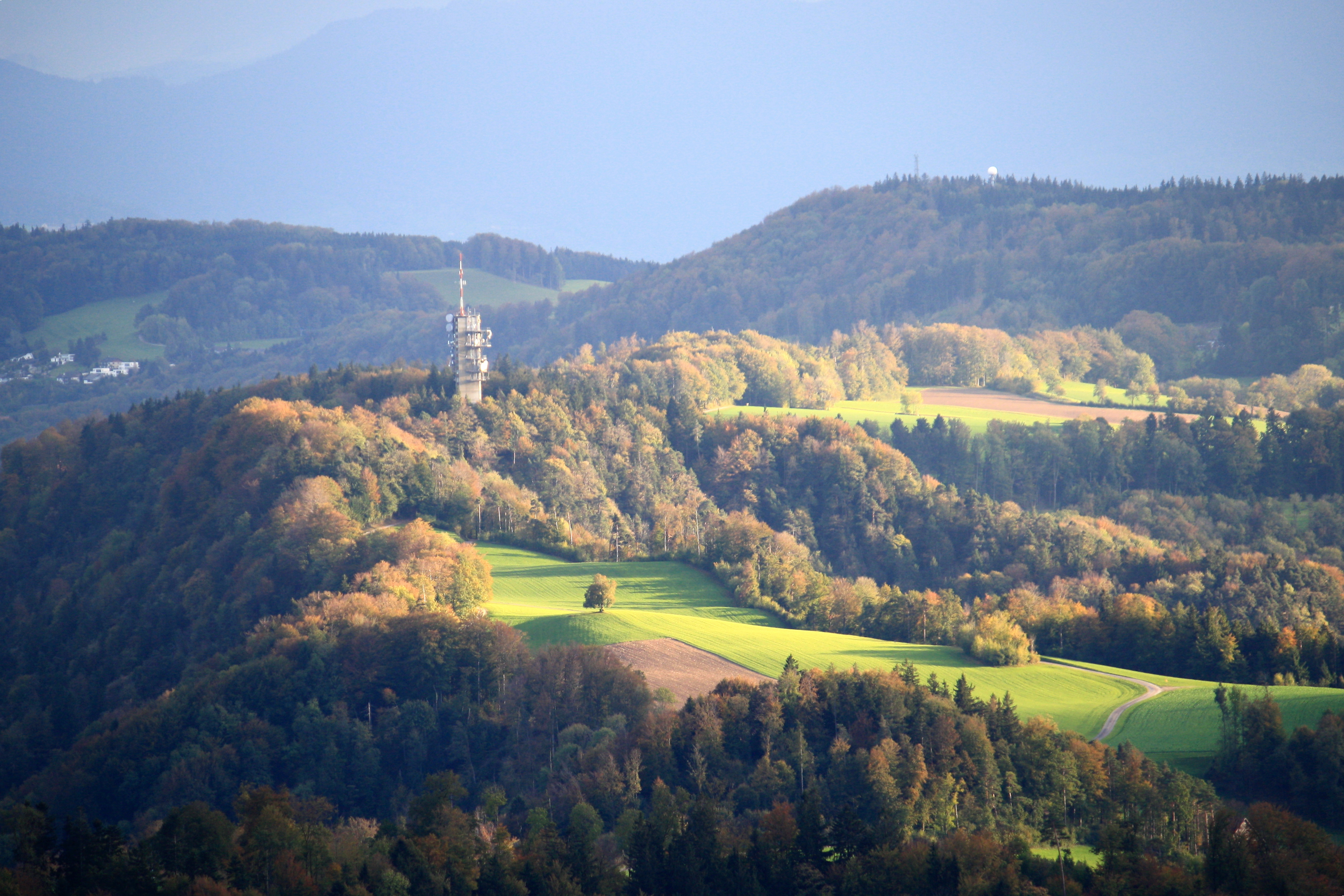
Felsenegg as seen from Uetliberg

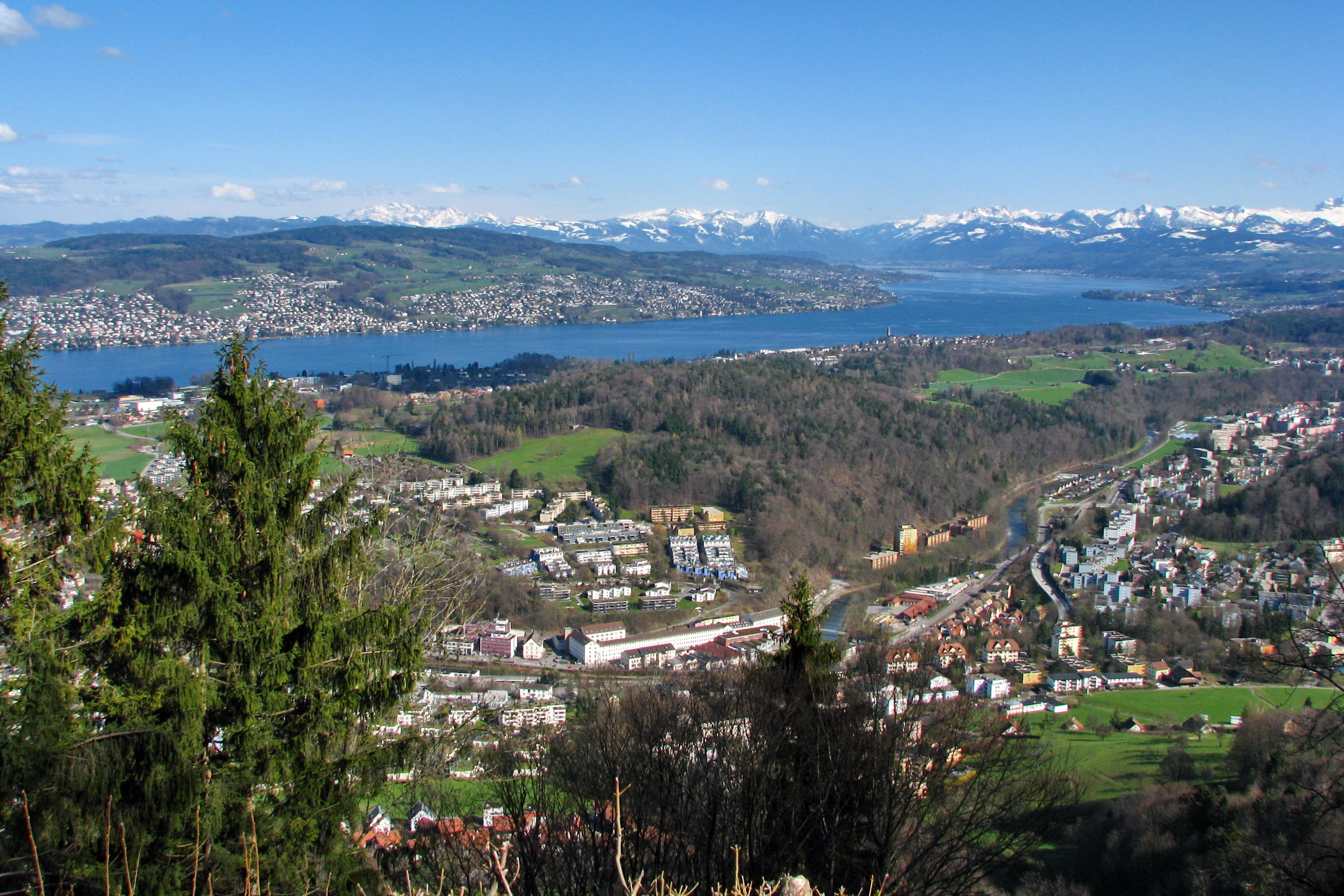
Sihl valley, Zimmerberg, Zürichsee and Pfannenstiel as seen from Felsenegg

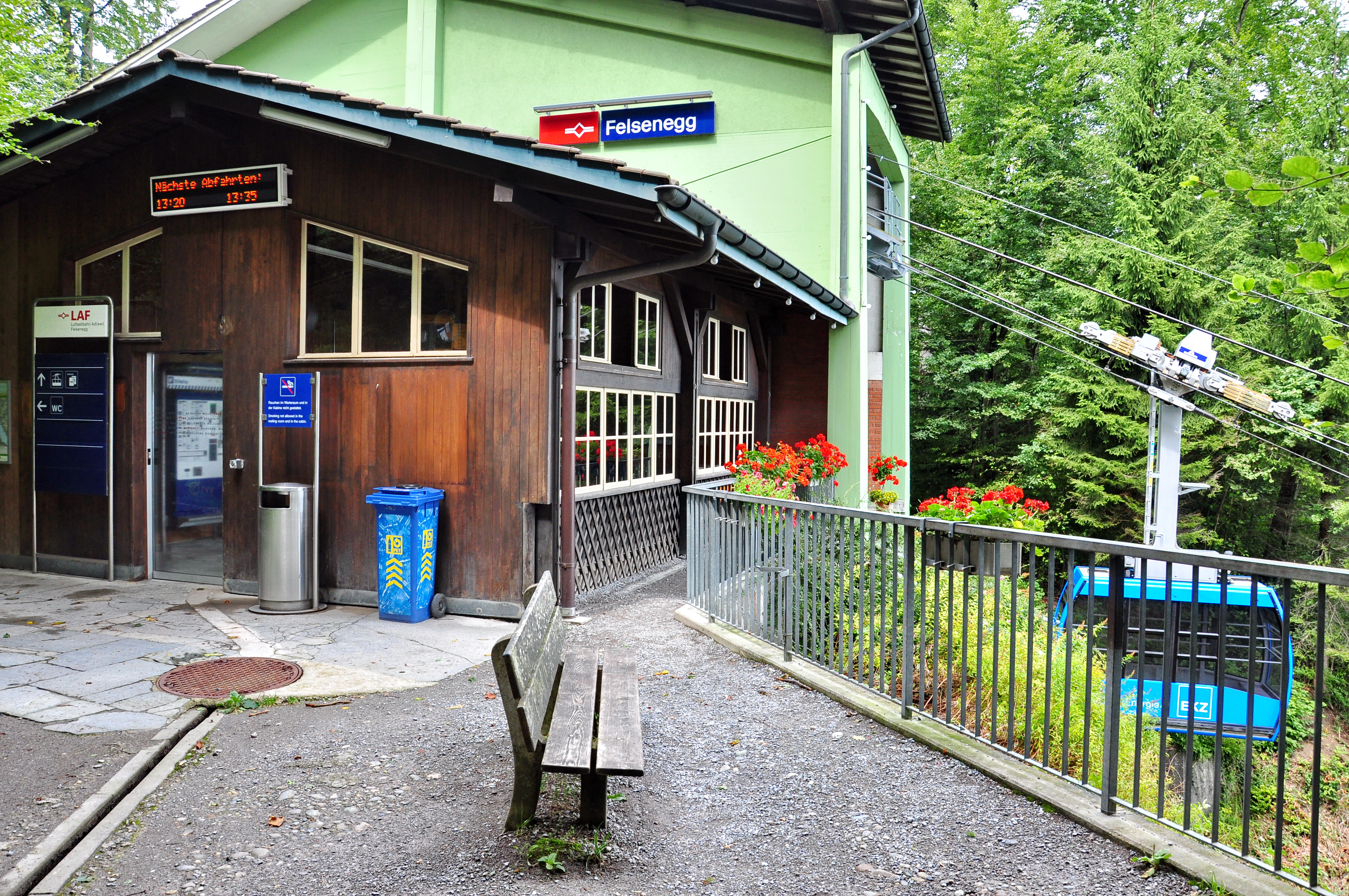
Luftseilbahn Adliswil-Felsenegg (LAF) station

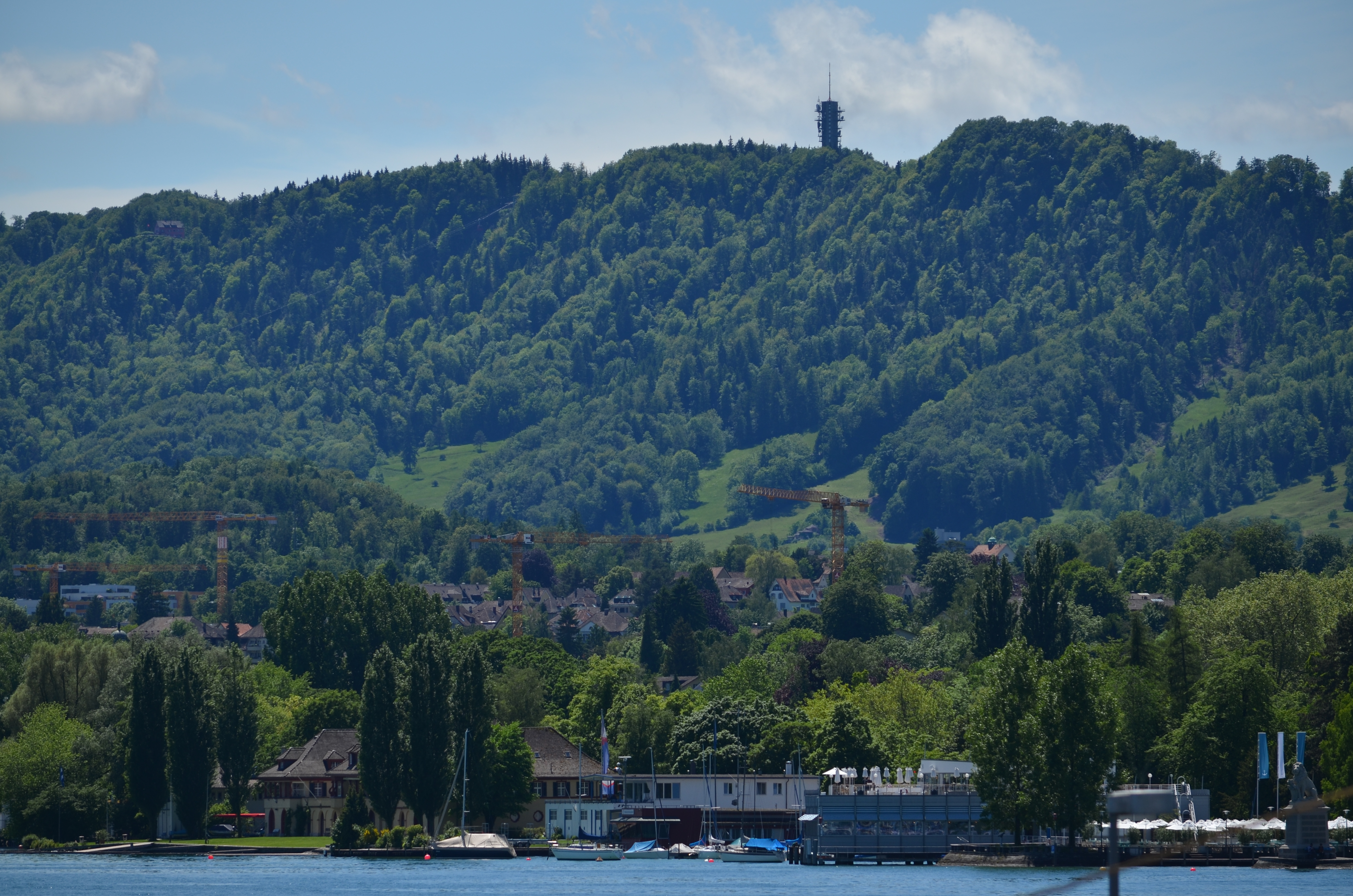
Felsenegg, Zürich-Wollishofen in the foreground

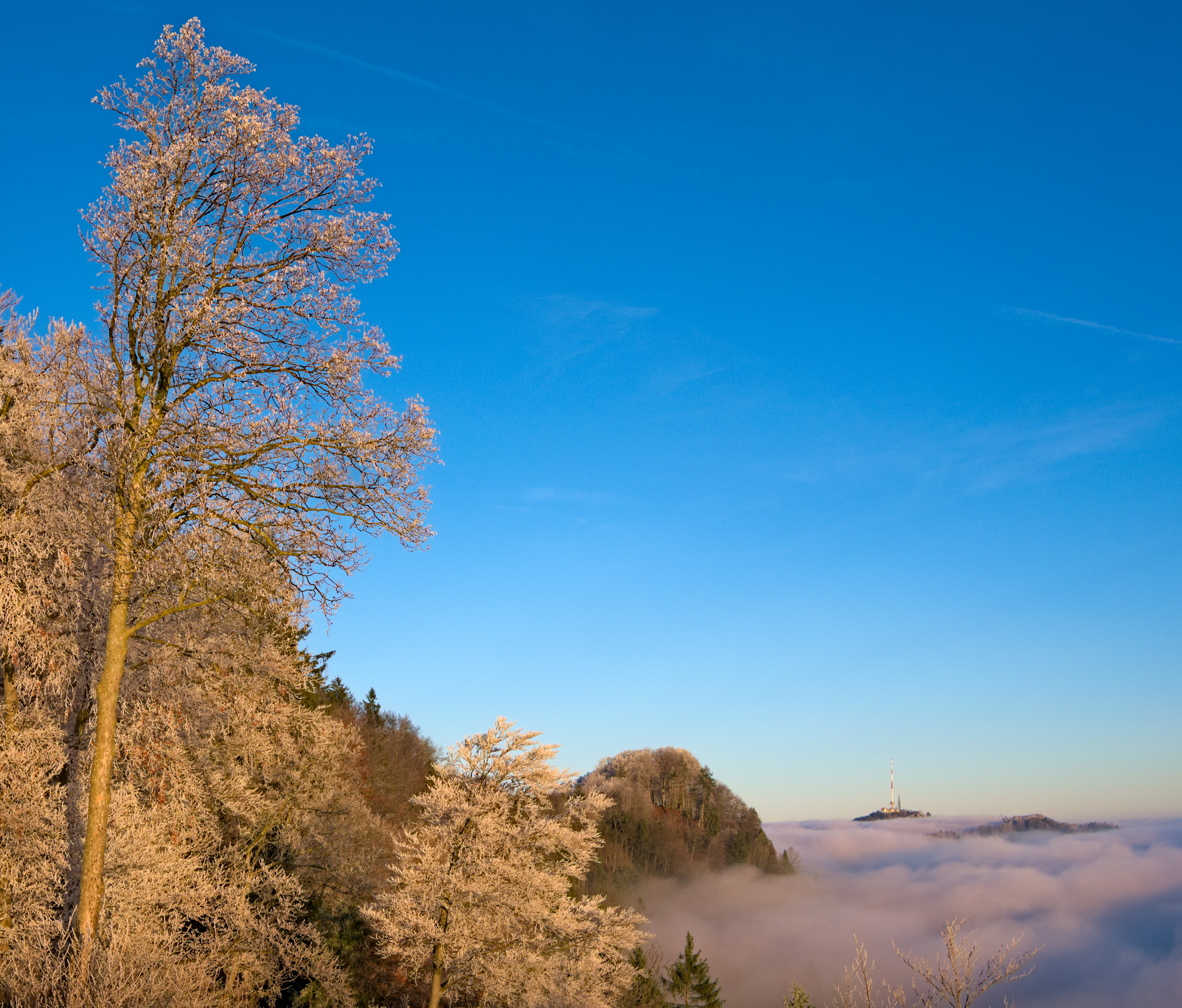
Uetliberg over a sea of clouds seen from Felsenegg

== Geography ==
Felsenegg is located some 7 km (4.3 mi) to the southwest of the city of Zürich on the Albis chain, between the municipalities of Stallikon and Adliswil. The hilltop station of Luftseilbahn Adliswil-Felsenegg (LAF for short or commonly called Felseneggbahn) aerial tramway is situated on Felsenegg. The Albis area is one of the most important recreation areas of greater Zürich. The area is mostly wooded, but also has extensive fields, often reaching to the summit, some cultivated, some used as pastures for cows or sheep.

== Points of interest ==
Being close to the city of Zürich, the area is heavily visited. Felsenegg includes a restaurant located at the summit overlooking the Sihl Valley and Lake Zürich to the east, and Reppisch valley, Türlersee and the so-called Säuliamt (District of Affoltern) to the west. Well maintained hiking trails from Uetliberg and Uetlibergbahn mountain station to the north, and from the Albis Pass to the south are highly frequented. Türlersee (Lake Türlen) and Säuliamt are popular hiking destinations, too, as well as a mountain pass and a trail, built between 1908 and 1912, heading for Adliswil respectively Hausen am Albis. Among other touristic attractions is the Planet trail (German: Planetenweg) which starts near Uetliberg Kulm. The Planet trail represents the Sun and each of the planets at a billionth (1:1,000,000,000) of their actual size and distance from each other, and each planet is represented at its scaled down distance from the Sun by a billionth size metal sphere, either atop or embedded in a stone mound. Felsenegg coincides with the midpoint of Pluto's elliptical orbit, as represented by the Planet trail, and the "Pluto" mound can be found approximately 20m from the Restaurant Felsenegg (see photographs below).

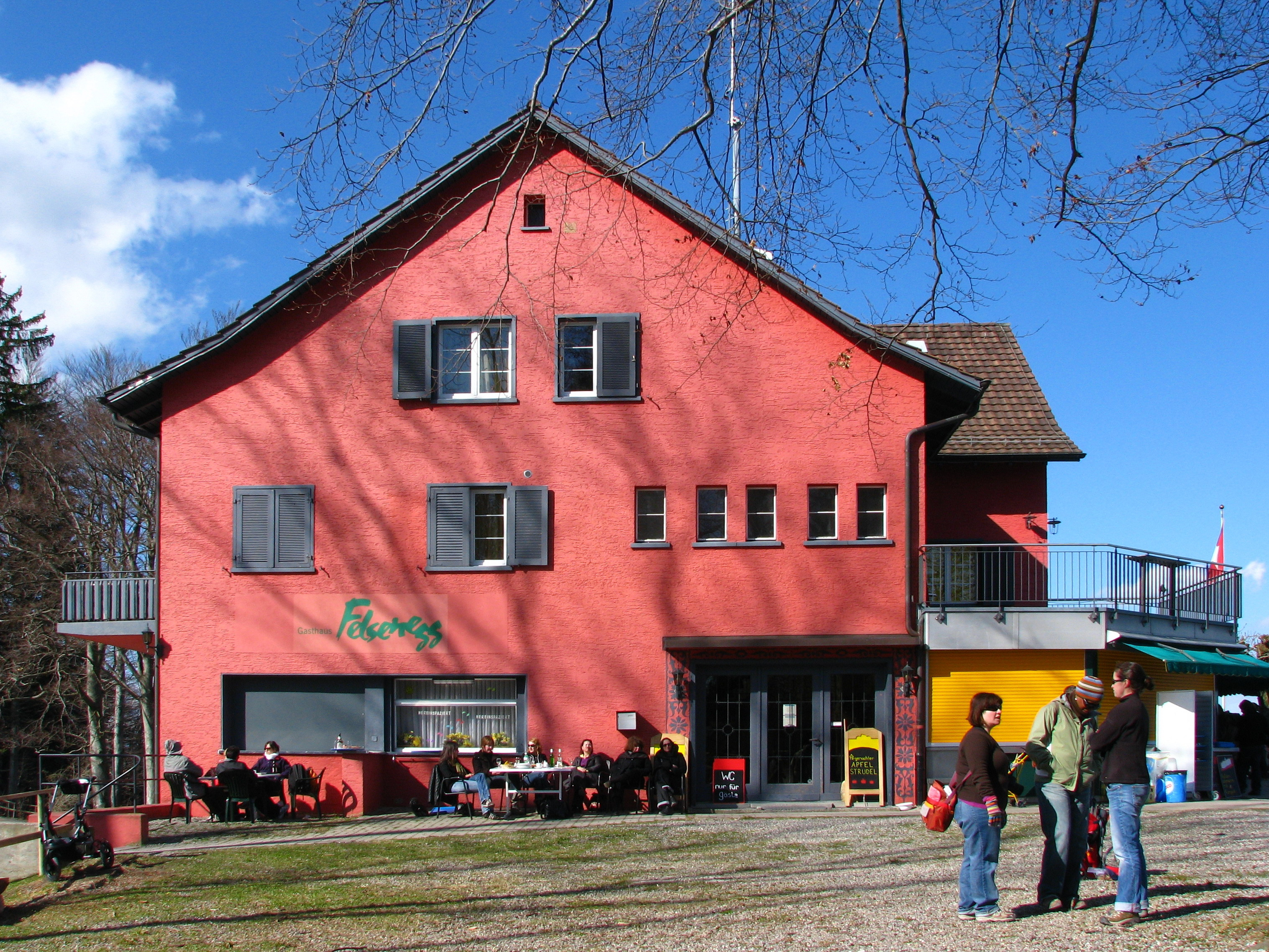
Felsenegg Restaurant

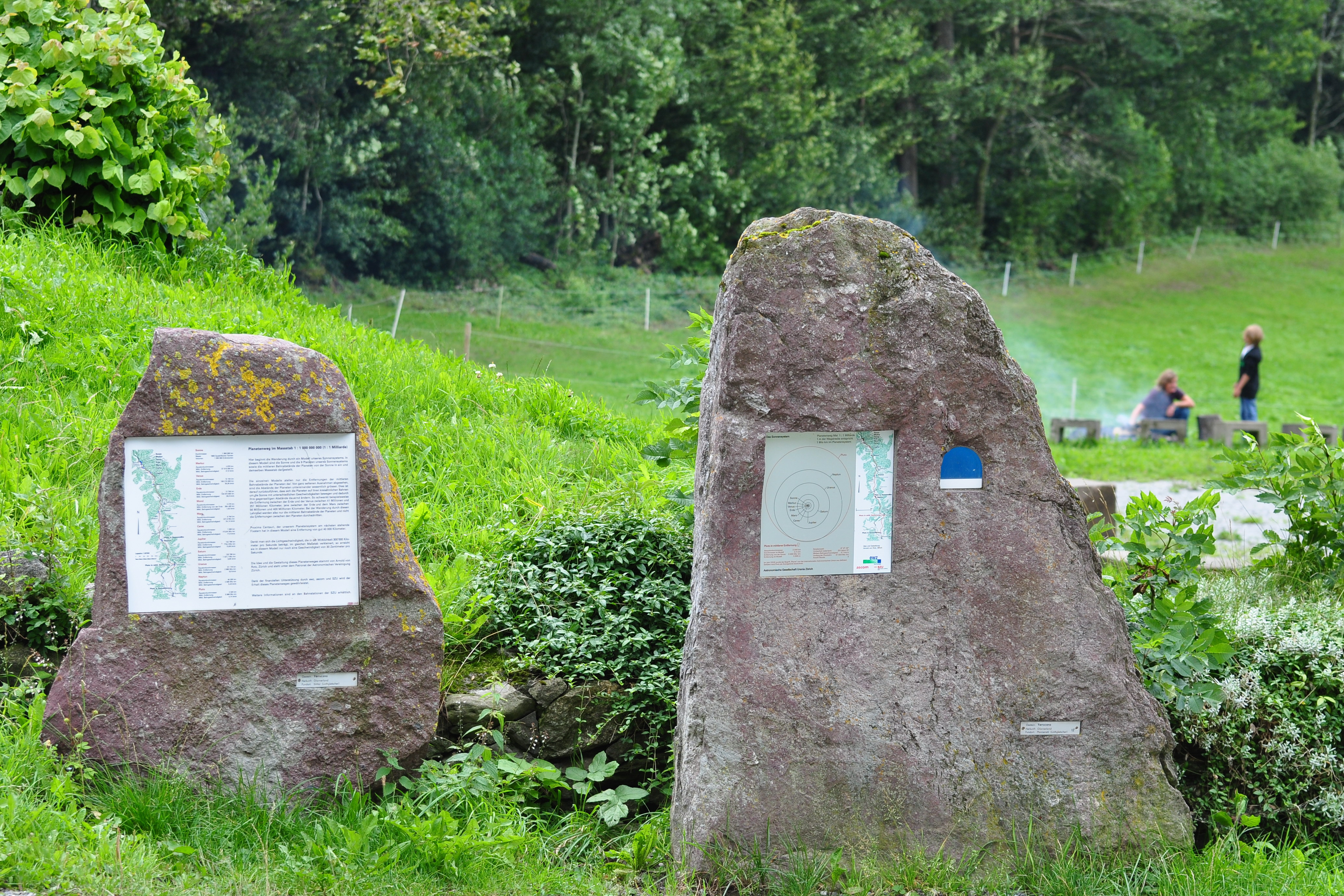
Planet trail (former Pluto) terminal on Felsenegg

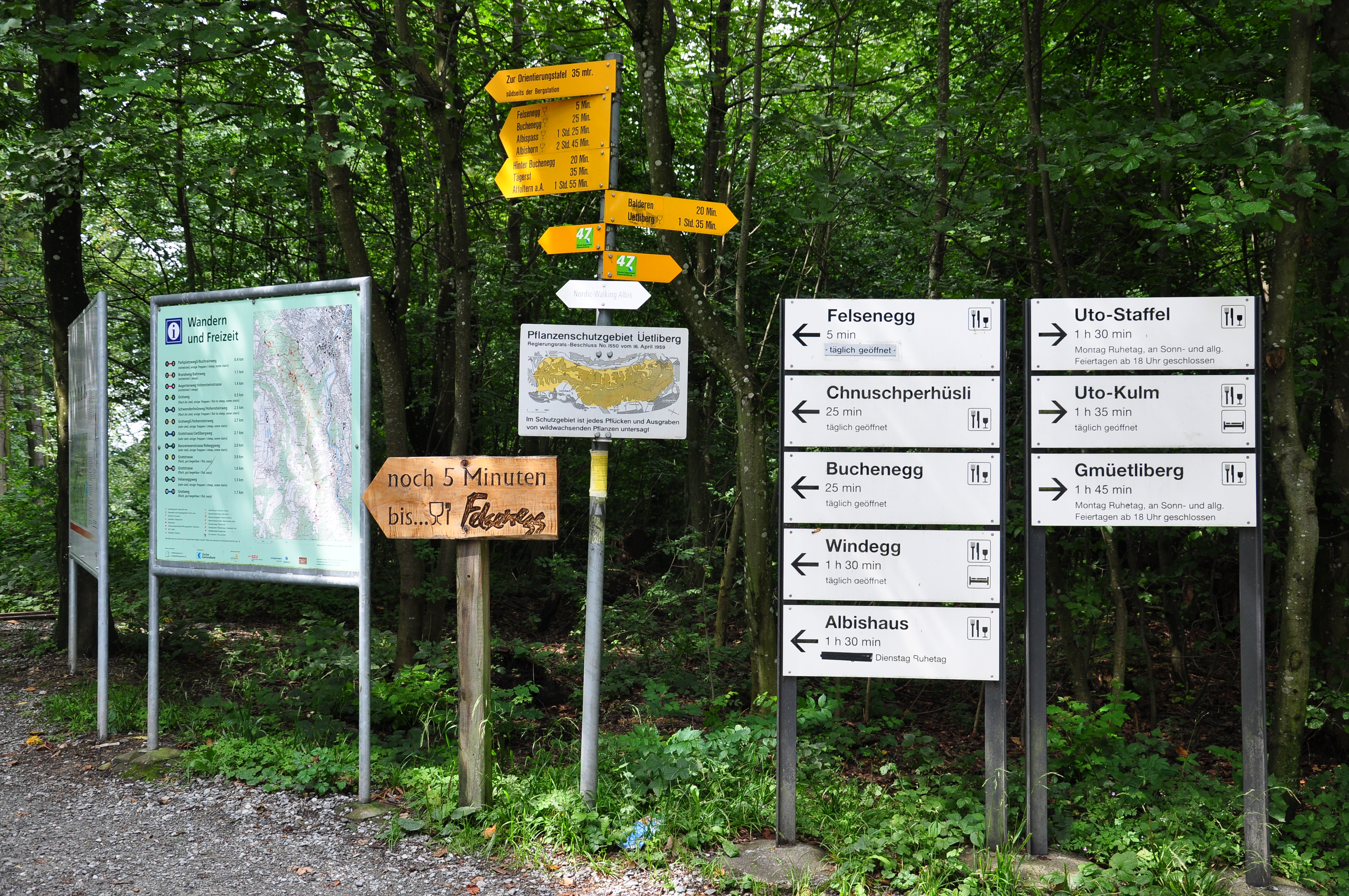
Hiking signs at the LAF hill station

Another landmark is the Felsenegg-Girstel TV-tower located nearby the Felseneggbahn mountain station. It is owned by Swisscom and generally not accessible by the public. The tower was built in 1959 for broadcasting of radio and television programs. Just to the north of the TV-tower is the Burgstelle Baldern, the site of medieval castle, marked by earthworks and a plaque.
