= Affoltern am Albis =

Swiss municipality in the canton of Zürich

- Municipality
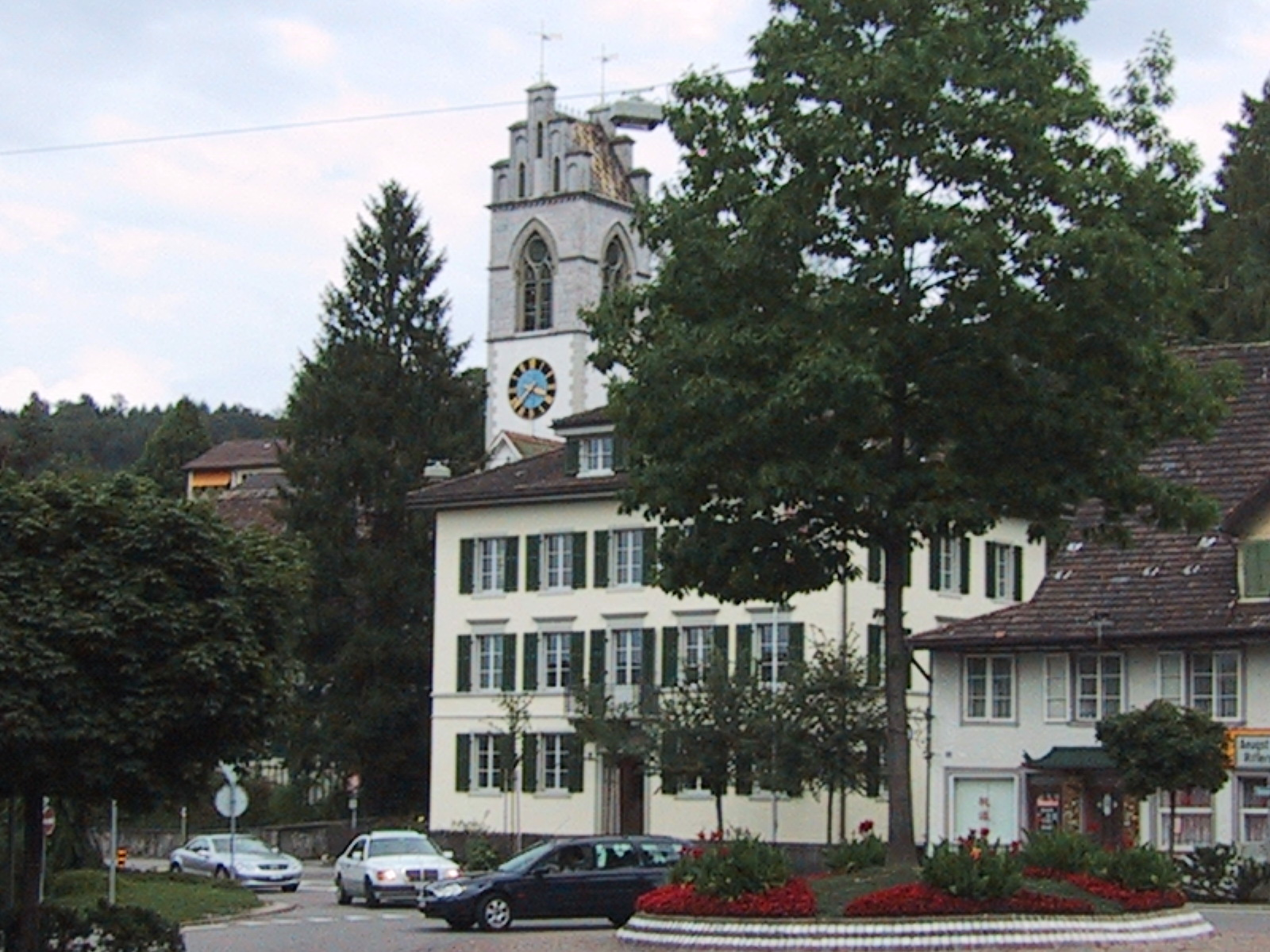

- Flag Coat of arms
- Location of Affoltern am Albis
- Location within Switzerland Location within Canton of Zurich
- Coordinates: 47°17′N 8°27′E
- Country: Switzerland
- Canton: Zurich
- District: Affoltern

Government
  - Executive: Gemeinderat with 7 members
  - Mayor: Gemeindepräsident; Clemens Grötsch unrelated
  - Parliament: none (Gemeindeversammlung)

Area
  - Total: 10.59 km^{2} (4.09 sq mi)
- Elevation (Central crossing near church): 491 m (1,611 ft)

Population (December 2020)
  - Total: 12,289
  - Density: 1,160/km^{2} (3,006/sq mi)
- Time zone: UTC+01:00 (CET)
  - Summer (DST): UTC+02:00 (CEST)
- Postal codes: 8910 Affoltern am Albis, 8909 Zwillikon
- SFOS number: 2
- ISO 3166 code: CH-ZH
- Localities: Zwillikon, Ferenbach, Loh, Unterdorf, Oberdorf
- Surrounded by: Aeugst am Albis, Hedingen, Jonen (AG), Mettmenstetten, Obfelden, Ottenbach, Stallikon
- Website: www.affoltern-am-albis.ch

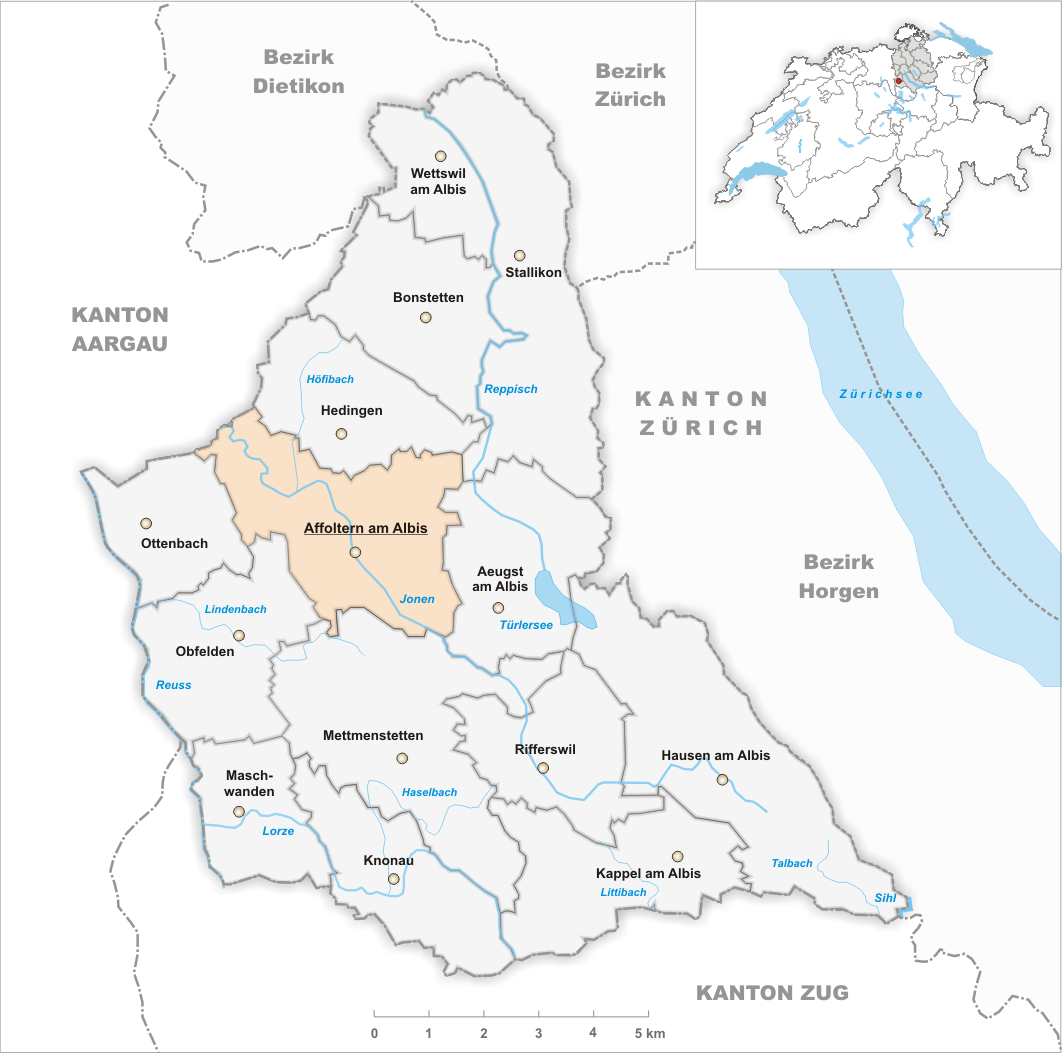
Affoltern

Aerial view (1945)

Affoltern am Albis (abbreviated as Affoltern a.A.; Swiss German: Affoltere) is a town and a municipality in the district of Affoltern in the canton of Zürich in Switzerland.

== History ==
Affoltern is first mentioned in 1190 as Afiltre.

== Geography ==
Affoltern has an area of 10.6 km^{2} (4.1 sq mi). Of this area, 45.7% is used for agricultural purposes, while 28.9% is forested. Of the rest of the land, 25% is settled (buildings or roads) and the remainder (0.5%) is non-productive (rivers, glaciers, or mountains).

The municipality is located west of the Albis hills in the moraine landscape around the Reuss. It was created in the 19th century through the merger of Ober- and Unteraffoltern, Zwillikon, and Loo-Fehrenbach.

== Demographics ==
Affoltern has a population (as of 31 December 2020) of 12,289. As of 2007, 25.5% of the population was made up of foreign nationals. Over the last 10 years the population has grown at a rate of 9.8%. Most of the population (as of 2000) speaks German (82.5%), with Italian being second most common (5.0%) and Serbo-Croatian being third (3.7%).

In the 2007 election the most popular party was the SVP which received 37.5% of the vote. The next three most popular parties were the SPS (17.3%), the FDP (11.4%), and the CSP (11.3%).

The age distribution of the population (as of 2000) is children and teenagers (0–19 years old) make up 25.2% of the population, while adults (20–64 years old) make up 62.4% and seniors (over 64 years old) make up 12.3%. In Affoltern about 71% of the population (between age 25–64) have completed either non-mandatory upper secondary education or additional higher education (either university or a Fachhochschule).

Affoltern has an unemployment rate of 2.8%. As of 2005, there were 85 people employed in the primary economic sector and about 33 businesses involved in this sector. 1238 people are employed in the secondary sector and there are 126 businesses in this sector. 3533 people are employed in the tertiary sector, with 441 businesses in this sector.

The historical population is given in the following table:

Year	Population
until about 1700	100–250
1736	1,060
1850	1,855
1900	2,779
1950	3,484
2000	10,314

== Transport ==
Affoltern am Albis railway station is a stop and a terminal station of the Zürich S-Bahn on the lines S5 and S14 respectively. Its train station is a 28-minute ride from Zürich Hauptbahnhof.

== Notable people ==
- Esther Fischer-Homberger (1940–2019), Swiss psychiatrist and medical historian
- Barbara Hofmann (born 1962), humanitarian and Founder of ASEM-Mozambique
- Idy Hegnauer (1909–2006 in Affoltern), Swiss nurse and peace activist
- Ernst Nievergelt (1910 in Affoltern – 1999), Swiss racing cyclist who competed in the 1936 Summer Olympics
- René Strehler (born 1934 in Affoltern), Swiss former professional racing cyclist
- Giuseppe Reichmuth (born 1944 in Affoltern), Swiss painter and artist
