= Türlersee =

Lake in the district of Affoltern, Canton of Zurich, Switzerland

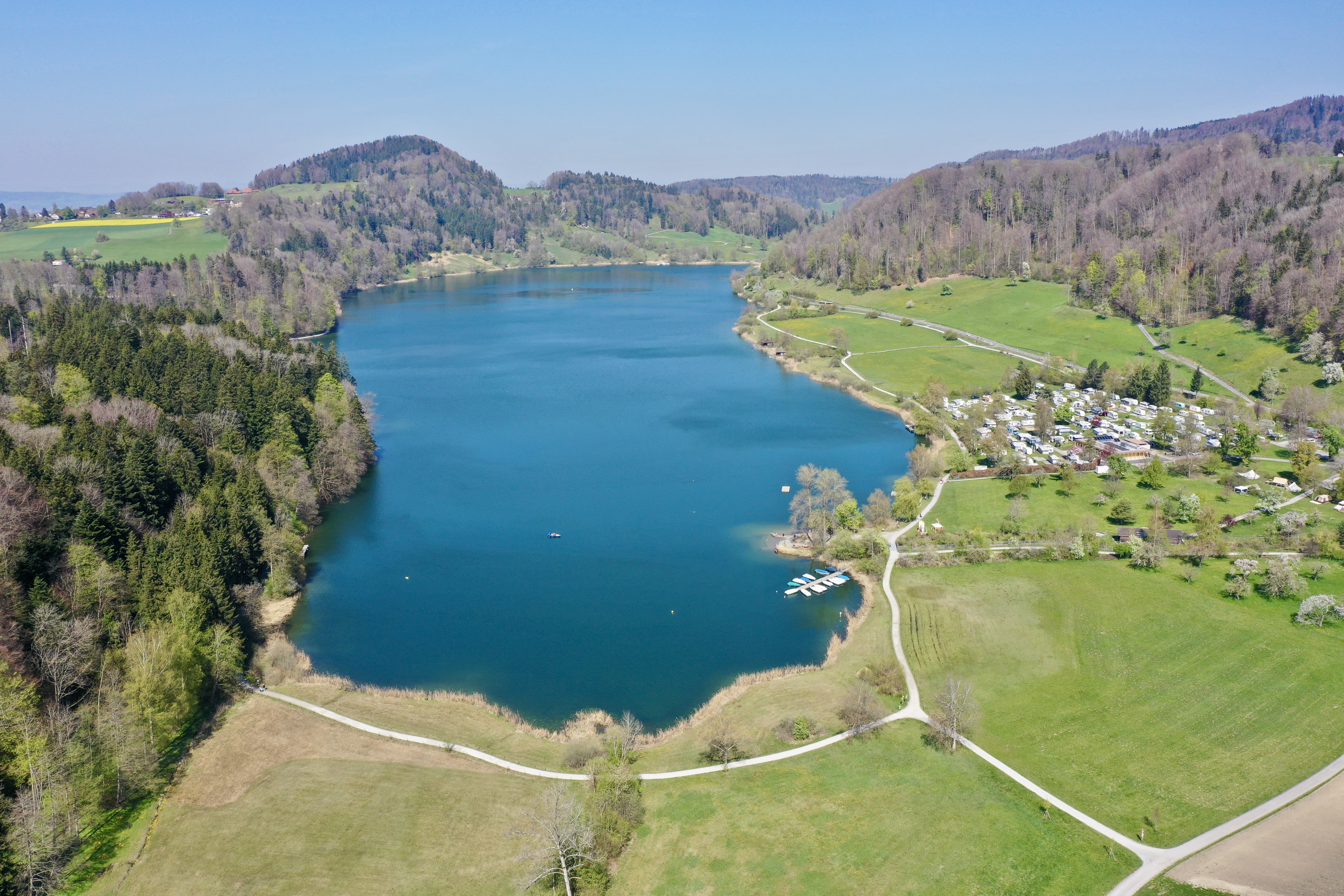

- Location within Canton of Zurich Location within Switzerland Location within Alps
- Interactive map of Türlersee
- Location: Canton of Zurich
- Coordinates: 47°16′6″N 8°30′10″E
- Primary outflows: Reppisch
- Basin countries: Switzerland
- Max. length: 1.4 km (0.87 mi)
- Max. width: 0.5 km (0.31 mi)
- Surface area: 0.49 km^{2} (0.19 sq mi)
- Average depth: 13 m (43 ft)
- Max. depth: 22 m (72 ft)
- Residence time: 730 days
- Surface elevation: 643 m (2,110 ft)
- Settlements: Türlen, Aeugstertal

Türlersee is a lake in the district of Affoltern, Canton of Zurich, Switzerland. It lies on the border of the municipalities of Aeugst and Hausen am Albis at an elevation of 643 m. The lake has an area of 0.49 km² (maximum length 1.4 km, width 500 m).

View from a wooden bridge on the shore (July 2020) (view as a 360° interactive panorama)

== Gallery ==
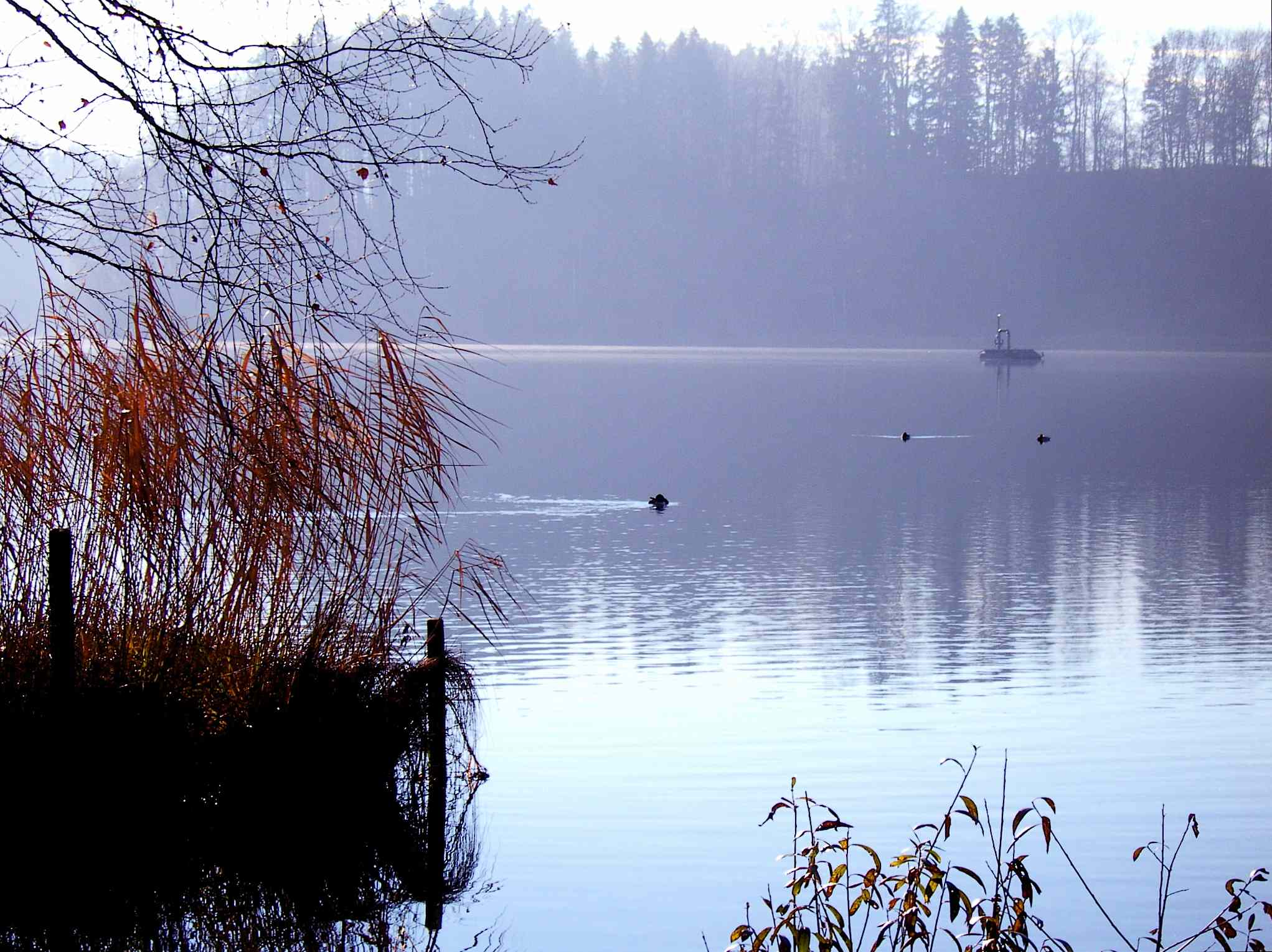

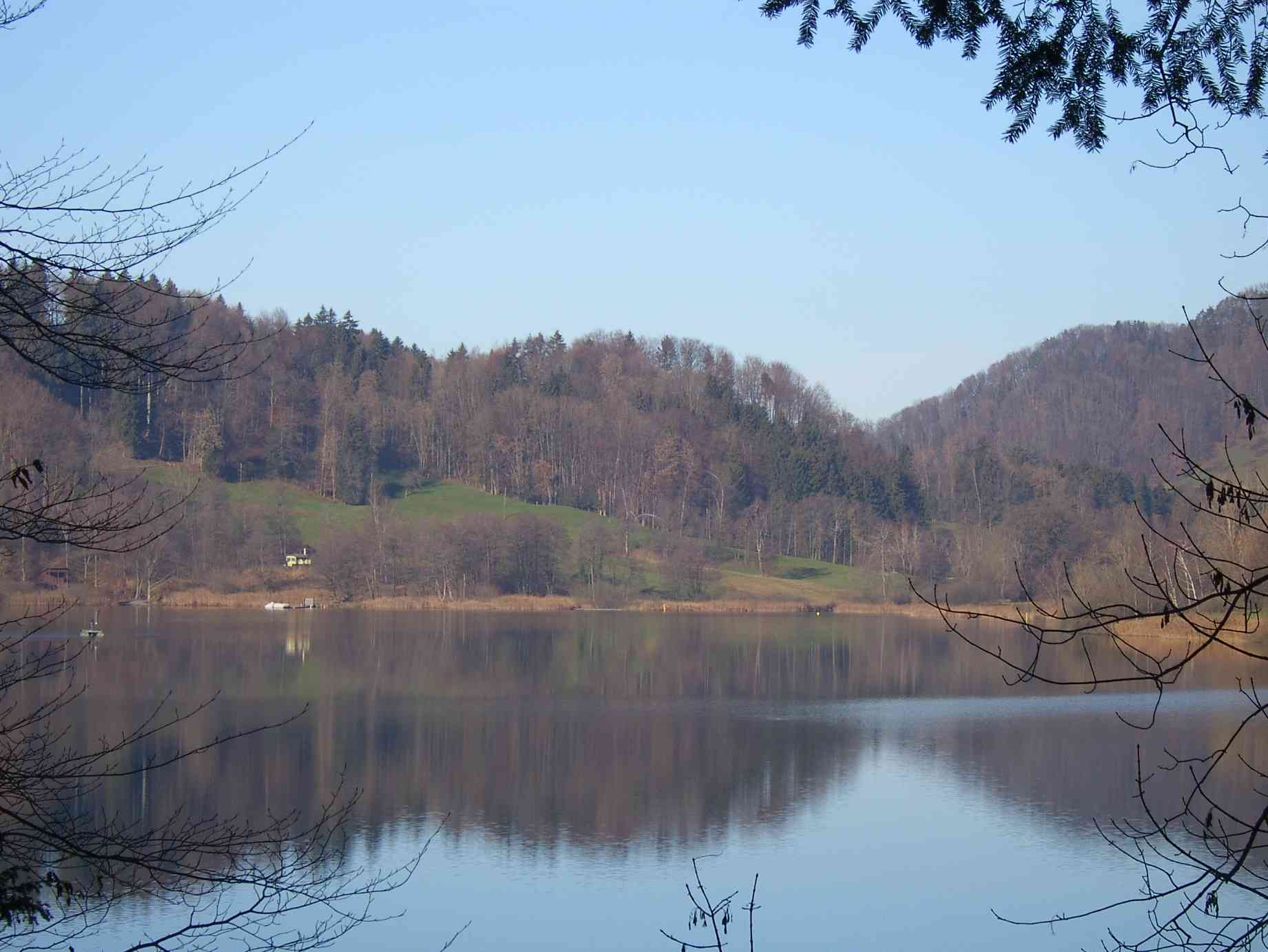

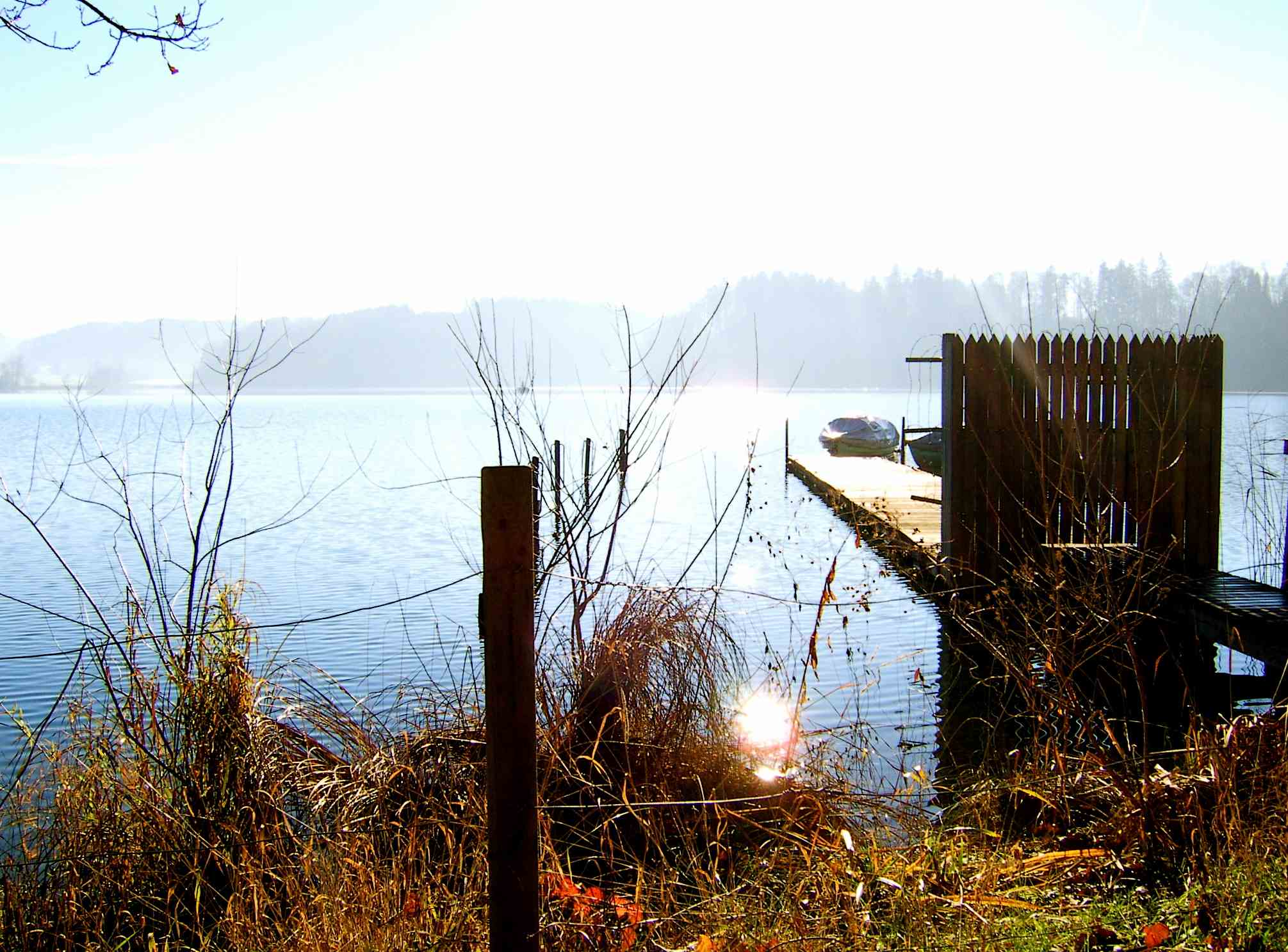

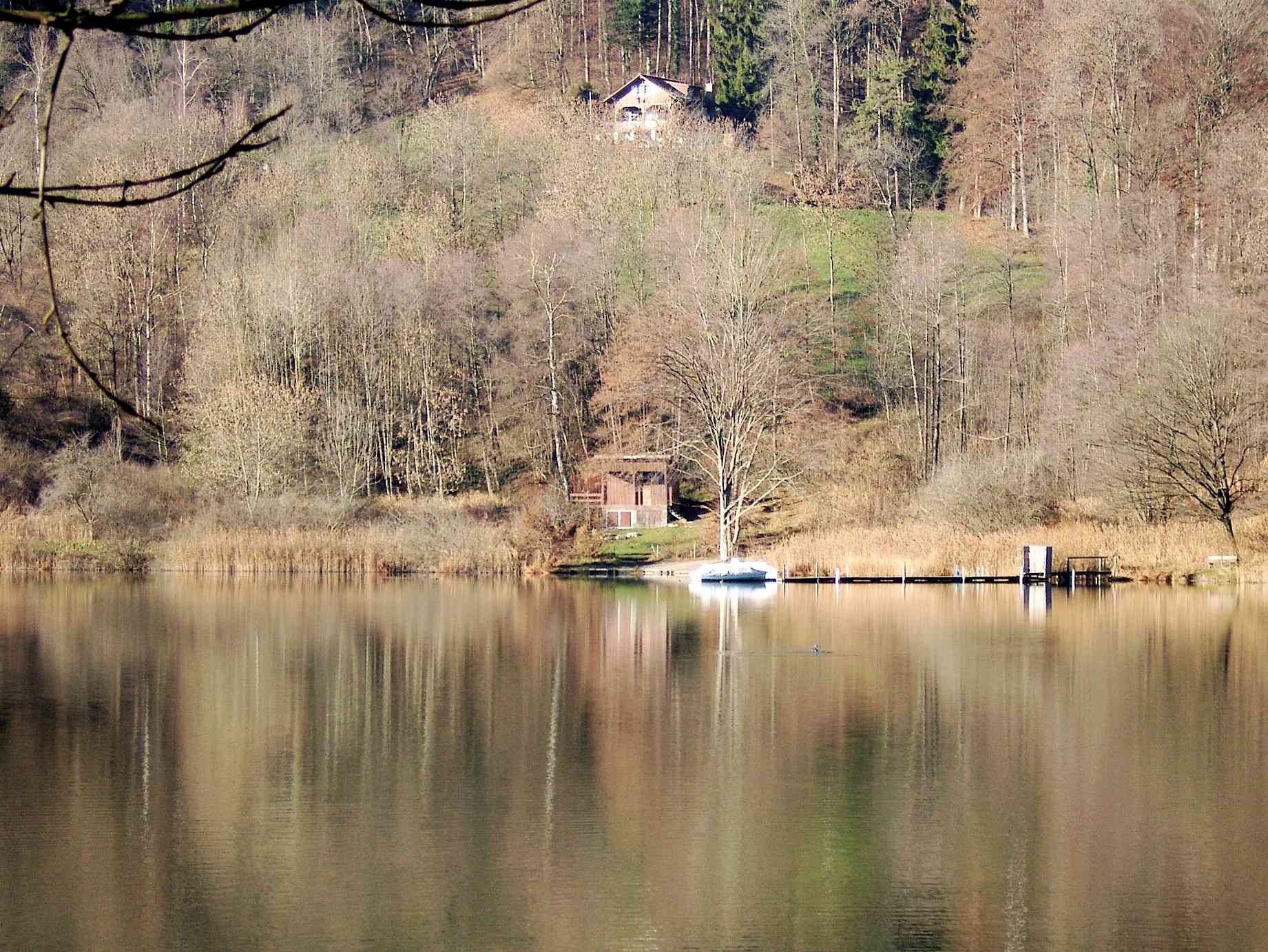

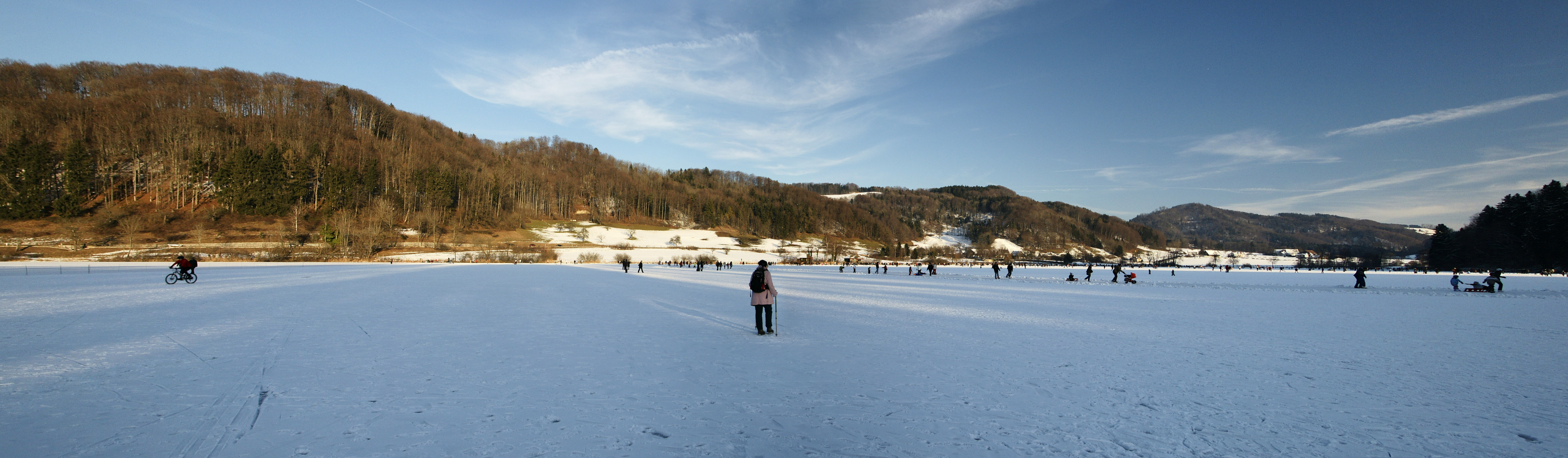

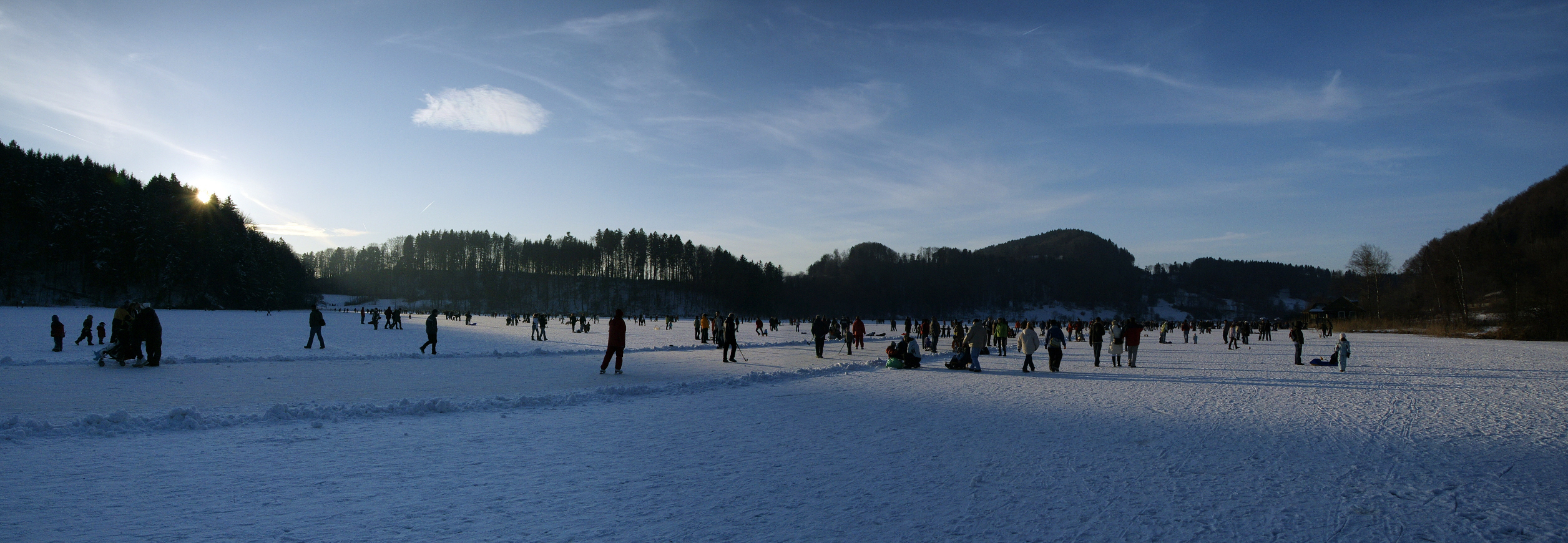

== See also ==
- List of lakes of Switzerland
