= Kappel am Albis =

- Municipality
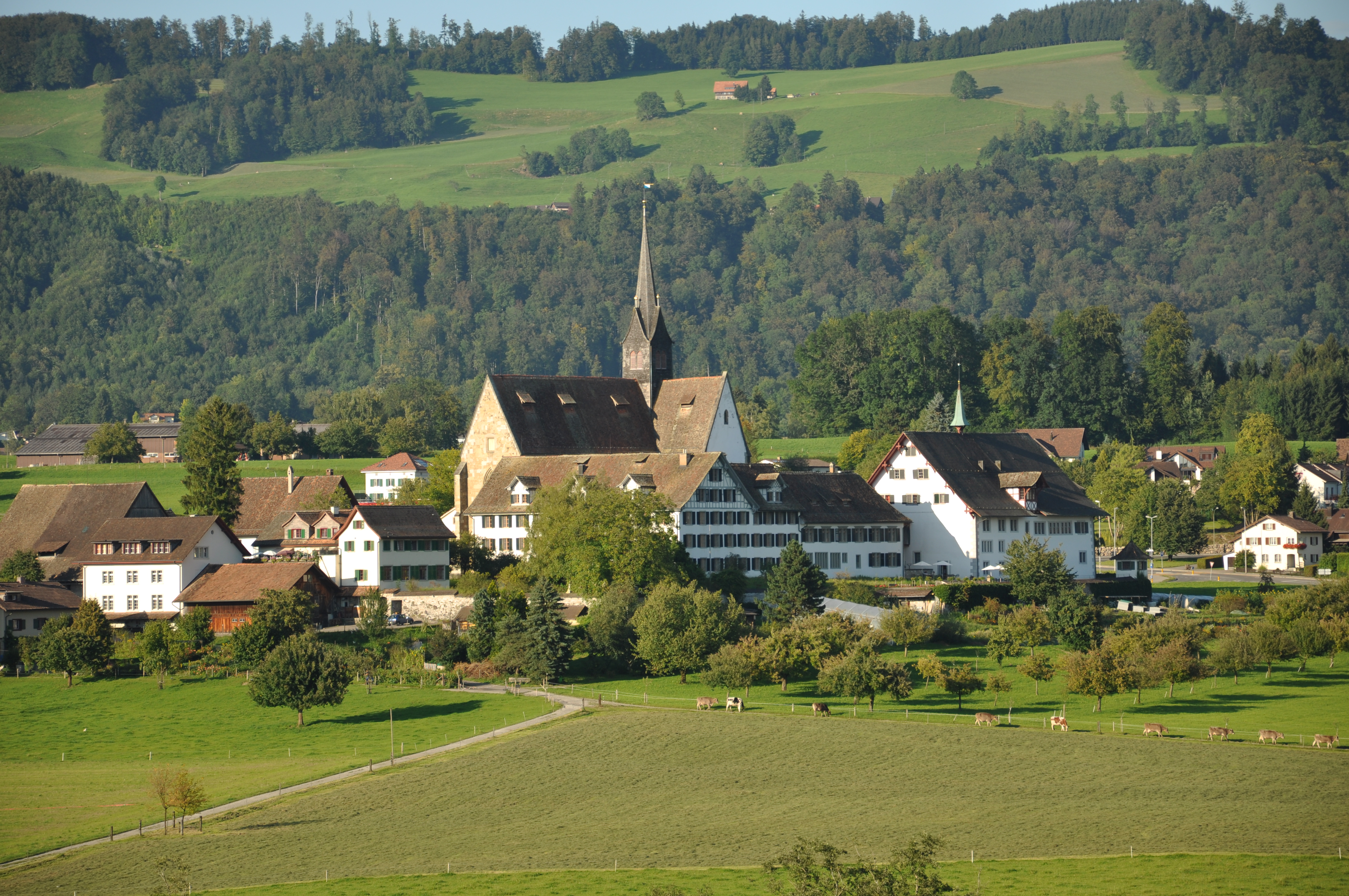

- Flag Coat of arms
- Location of Kappel am Albis
- Location within Switzerland Location within Canton of Zurich
- Coordinates: 47°14′N 8°31′E
- Country: Switzerland
- Canton: Zurich
- District: Affoltern-am-Albis

Government
  - Mayor: Kurt Bär

Area
  - Total: 7.87 km^{2} (3.04 sq mi)
- Elevation: 573 m (1,880 ft)

Population (December 2020)
  - Total: 1,245
  - Density: 158/km^{2} (410/sq mi)
- Time zone: UTC+01:00 (CET)
  - Summer (DST): UTC+02:00 (CEST)
- Postal code: 8926
- SFOS number: 6
- ISO 3166 code: CH-ZH
- Surrounded by: Baar (ZG), Hausen am Albis, Knonau, Mettmenstetten, Rifferswil, Steinhausen (ZG)
- Website: www.kappel-am-albis.ch

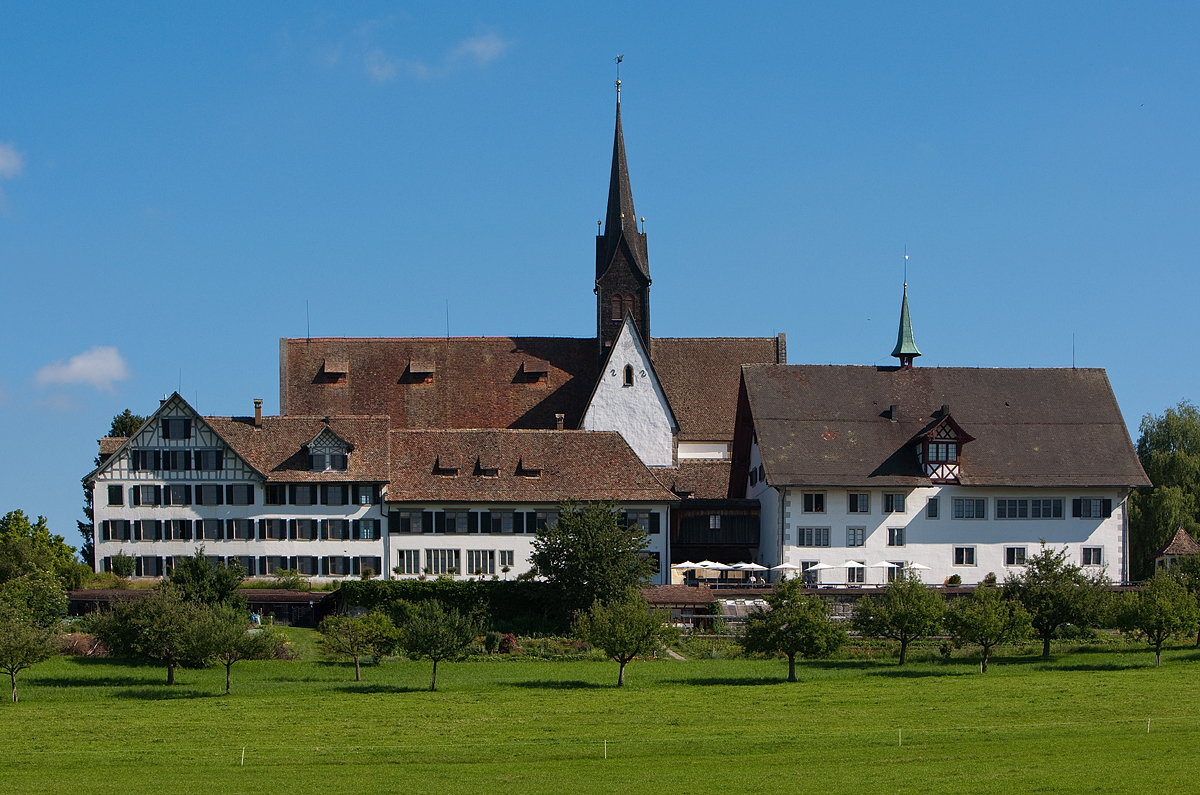
Kappel monastery

Kappel am Albis is a municipality in the district of Affoltern in the canton of Zürich in Switzerland.

Its name of Kappel (German: chapel) is specified by "on the Albis" to distinguish it from two other villages called Kappel in Switzerland.

== History ==
Kappel am Albis is first mentioned in 1185 as de Capella.

The settlement was founded in 1185 as a Cistercian monastery which today houses a seminar centre, hotel, cafe and a restaurant.

It was the location of the Wars of Kappel in 1529 and 1531, during the turmoils that accompanied the Reformation of Huldrych Zwingli. A monument to Zwingli is located nearby at the hamlet of Näfenhäuser.

Aerial view (1953)

== Geography ==
Kappel am Albis has an area of 7.8 km^{2} (3.0 sq mi). Of this area, 70.6% is used for agricultural purposes, while 21% is forested. Of the rest of the land, 7.4% is settled (buildings or roads) and the remainder (1%) is non-productive (rivers, glaciers or mountains).

== Demographics ==
Kappel am Albis has a population (as of 31 December 2020) of 1,245. As of 2007, 8.9% of the population was made up of foreign nationals. Over the last 10 years the population has decreased at a rate of -0.7%. Most of the population (as of 2000) speaks German (96.1%), with English being second most common (1.3%) and French being third (0.7%).

In the 2007 election the most popular party was the SVP which received 54.7% of the vote. The next three most popular parties were the CSP (12.7%), the SPS (10.9%) and the FDP (7.4%).

The age distribution of the population (as of 2000) is children and teenagers (0–19 years old) make up 28.1% of the population, while adults (20–64 years old) make up 60.8% and seniors (over 64 years old) make up 11.1%. The entire Swiss population is generally well educated. In Kappel am Albis about 83.6% of the population (between age 25-64) have completed either non-mandatory upper secondary education or additional higher education (either university or a Fachhochschule).

Kappel am Albis has an unemployment rate of 1.09%. As of 2005, there were 75 people employed in the primary economic sector and about 29 businesses involved in this sector. 65 people are employed in the secondary sector and there are 18 businesses in this sector. 124 people are employed in the tertiary sector, with 25 businesses in this sector. The historical population is given in the following table:

year	population
1634	256
1799	438
1850	743
1900	697
1950	676
1980	567
2000	865

== Notable people ==
- Josias Simmler (1530 in Kappel am Albis – 1576) a theologian and classicist, author of the first book relating solely to the Alps.
- Ernst Nievergelt (1910 in Affoltern – 1999 in Kappel am Albis) a cyclist who competed in the 1936 Summer Olympics
