= Giuseppe Reichmuth =

Swiss artist

Giuseppe Reichmuth (born 1944 in Affoltern am Albis, Canton of Zürich) is a Swiss painter and artist. He does not belong to a movement of art, because he chooses his style depending on his subject. Reichmuth's only fixed attribute is humour.

== Works ==
The first and probably best-known painting is Zürich Eiszeit (Zurich Ice Age) (1975), which became an important symbol during the youth protests of the 1980s. The work shows in a photorealistic way, a frozen Zürich city center covered in Antarctic ice, as an icebreaker ship advances between the town hall and the church.

There is even a group of penguins. If you look closely, you will notice the last "penguin" is actually something else... ;~) The work was interpreted as a criticism on the supposedly fossil and cold state of Zurich; a state, that the 1980s movement of youths and writers like Fritz Zorn criticised heavily, too.

In a very similar way, the painting Dinosaurier auf der Autobahn (English: dinosaur on the freeway) was made. Afterwards, the style of Reichmuth started changing and became more and more miscellaneous. Reichmuth participated theatre projects in Baden, e.g. the Jerry Dental Kollekdoof. He got to know Ruedi Häusermann and did a lot of performances with him. In Bleu et gentil (1985) they dressed up like policemen and walked through the streets hand in hand.

Also provocative was Reichmuthps painting of a vicious, smoking pope and the performance, that included hanging laundry on a lot of wires through the areaway of the university. In German, there is a figure of speech that says "dreckige Wäsche zu waschen" ("to wash dirty laundry").

Together with Roman Casanova, Reichmuth painted his Hin- und Herbilder: One of the two painted a picture, this picture was photocopied and sent to the other artist, who repainted it more or less (but never totally) and then copied again and sent it back – from March 1997 on until the end of 2003. The result is 83 paintings, that were exposed together.

== Trivia ==
- Zürich Eiszeit was the cover image for the CD Swiss Kult Hits Vol. 2.
- As Robert Gernhardt discovered one of Reichmuth's poems on the wall of a restroom, this was his proof, that "at least this work became common property".
- Zürich Eiszeit became a popular motive of the 1980s juvenile riots in Zurich.
- Dinosaurier auf der Autobahn made its way to the United States, where it was seen on posters, T-shirts and even a house wall.
- After Reichmuth further paintings like Zürich Eiszeit were planned, which apply the same principle on other cities: e.g. a flooded New York City with streets deeply under water. But after finishing the time-consuming Zürich Eiszeit, Reichmuth has had it. Experts suppose, that Reichmuth has missed his chance to get rich, because he stopped making photorealistic catastrophe paintings.
- His great grandson is Dustin Reichmuth an American songwriter.

== Works ==
- Zürich Eiszeit, 1975
- Dinosaurier auf der Autobahn, 1980
- bleu et gentil (performance), 1985
- Word chains mounted on walls, e.g.: GURKENSALATTENTATOMEXPLOSIONANIERENWäRMER….
- Hin- und Her-Bilder (with Roman Casanova)
