= Rifferswil =

- Municipality
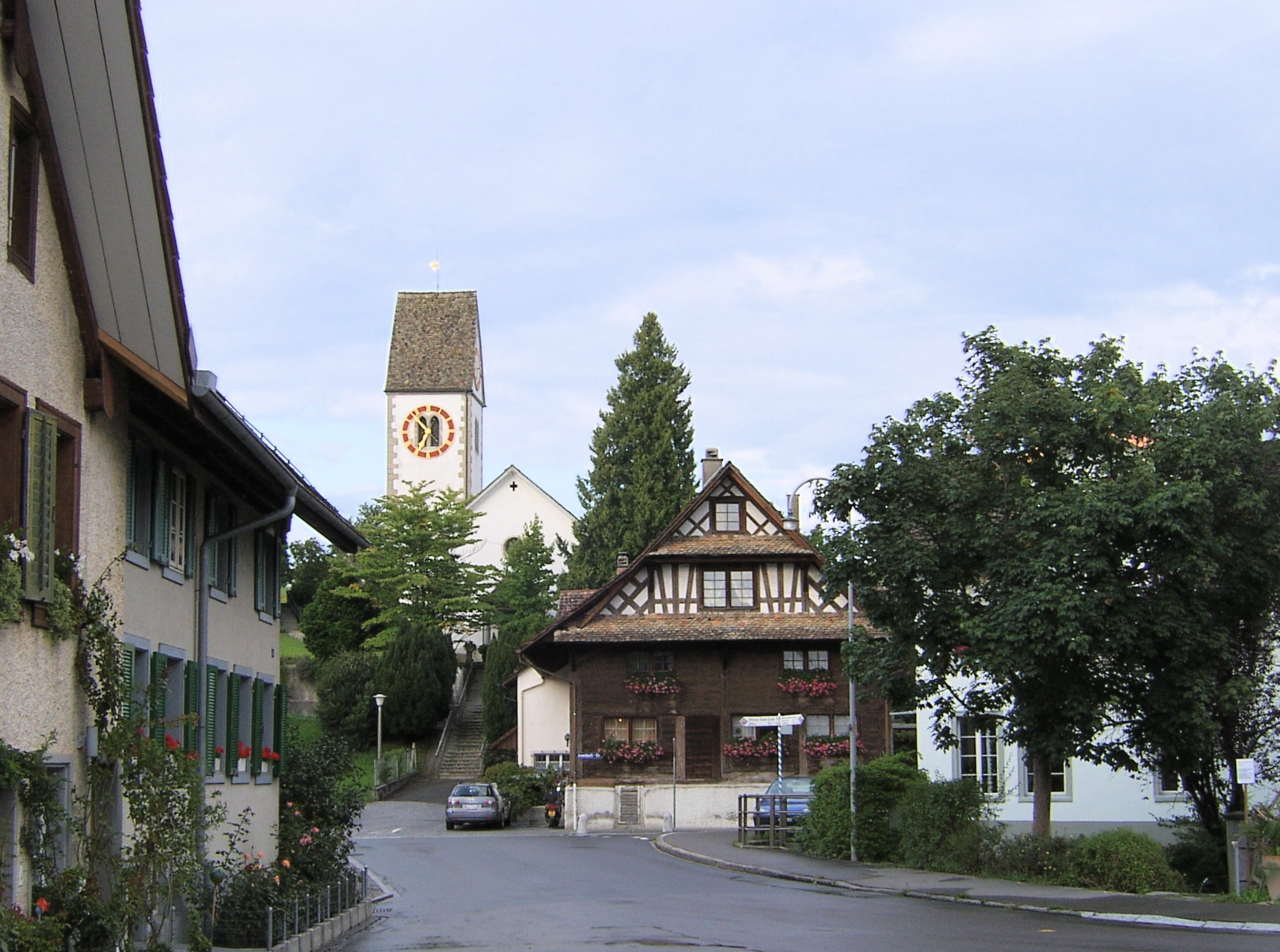

- Flag Coat of arms
- Location of Rifferswil
- Location within Switzerland Location within Canton of Zurich
- Coordinates: 47°14′N 8°28′E
- Country: Switzerland
- Canton: Zurich
- District: Affoltern

Area
  - Total: 6.50 km^{2} (2.51 sq mi)
- Elevation: 579 m (1,900 ft)

Population (December 2020)
  - Total: 1,148
  - Density: 177/km^{2} (457/sq mi)
- Time zone: UTC+01:00 (CET)
  - Summer (DST): UTC+02:00 (CEST)
- Postal code: 8911
- SFOS number: 12
- ISO 3166 code: CH-ZH
- Surrounded by: Aeugst am Albis, Hausen am Albis, Kappel am Albis, Mettmenstetten
- Website: www.rifferswil.ch

Rifferswil is a village in the district of Affoltern in the canton of Zürich in Switzerland.

== Geography ==
Aerial view (1970)

Rifferswil has an area of 6.6 km^{2} (2.5 sq mi). Of this area, 66.4% is used for agricultural purposes, 22.7% is forested, 9% is settled (buildings or roads) and the remainder (2%) is non-productive (rivers, glaciers or mountains).

== Demographics ==
Rifferswil has a population (as of 31 December 2020) of 1,148. As of 2007, 5.7% of the population was made up of foreign nationals. Over the last 10 years the population has grown at a rate of 14%. Most of the population (as of 2000) speaks German (97.5%), with French being second most common ( 0.7%) and Italian being third ( 0.4%).

In the 2007 election the most popular party was the SVP which received 32.7% of the vote. The next three most popular parties were the SPS (22.8%), the Green Party (14.8%) and the CSP (14%).

The age distribution of the population (as of 2000) is 28.6% children and teenagers (0–19 years old) 58.4% adults (20–64 years old), and 13% seniors (over 64 years old). In Rifferswil about 88.5% of the population (between age 25-64) have completed either non-mandatory upper secondary education or additional higher education (either university or a Fachhochschule).

Rifferswil has an unemployment rate of 1.59%. As of 2005, there were 58 people employed in the primary economic sector and about 21 businesses involved in this sector. 67 people are employed in the secondary sector and there are 15 businesses in this sector. 61 people are employed in the tertiary sector, with 21 businesses in this sector.
