= Stallikon =

- Municipality
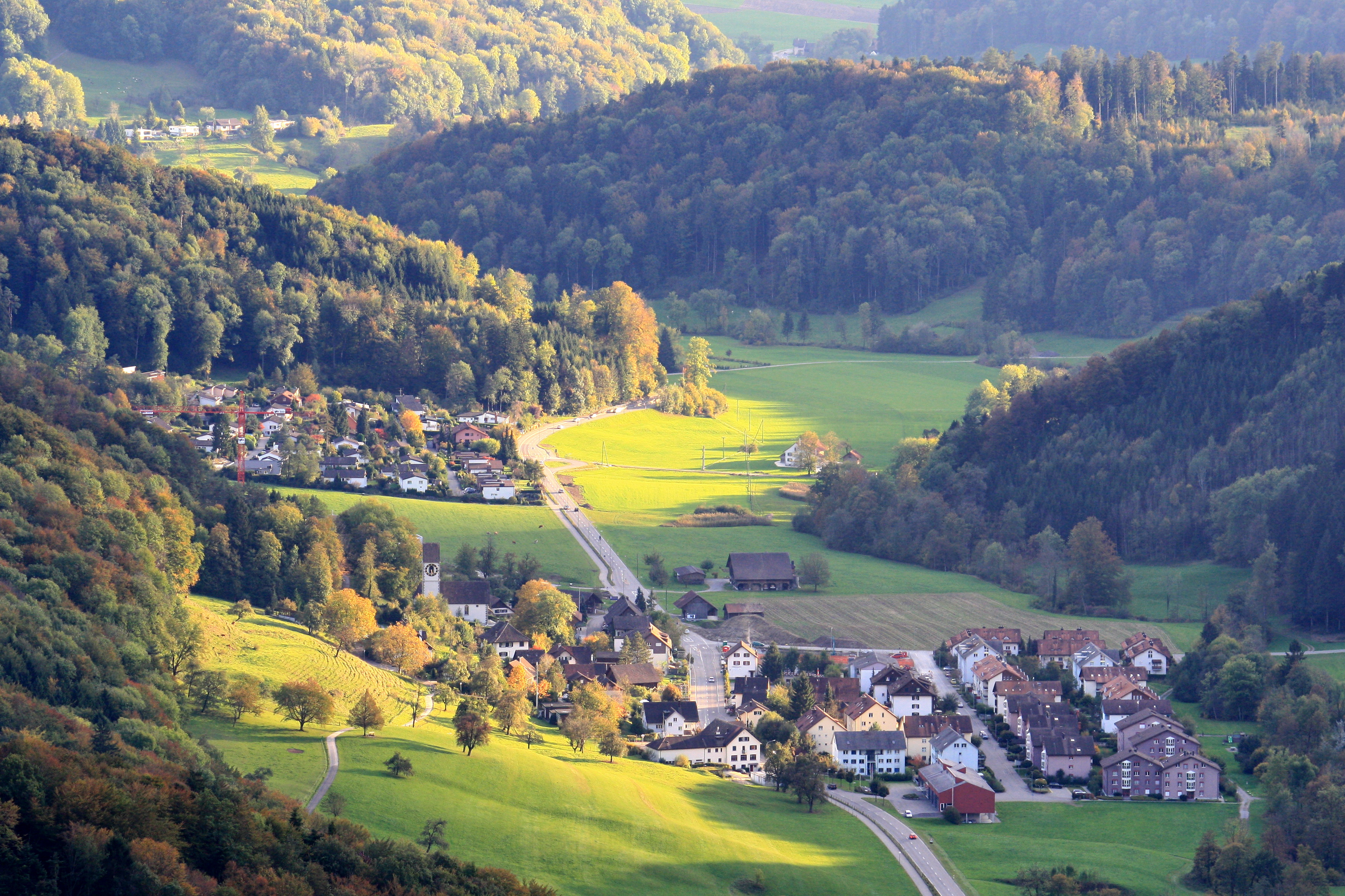

- Flag Coat of arms
- Location of Stallikon
- Location within Switzerland Location within Canton of Zurich
- Coordinates: 47°20′N 8°29′E
- Country: Switzerland
- Canton: Zurich
- District: Affoltern

Area
  - Total: 12.01 km^{2} (4.64 sq mi)
- Elevation: 534 m (1,752 ft)

Population (December 2020)
  - Total: 3,783
  - Density: 315.0/km^{2} (815.8/sq mi)
- Time zone: UTC+01:00 (CET)
  - Summer (DST): UTC+02:00 (CEST)
- Postal code: 8143
- SFOS number: 13
- ISO 3166 code: CH-ZH
- Surrounded by: Adliswil, Aeugst am Albis, Affoltern am Albis, Birmensdorf, Bonstetten, Hedingen, Langnau am Albis, Uitikon, Wettswil am Albis, Zurich
- Website: www.stallikon.ch

Stallikon is a municipality in the district of Affoltern in the canton of Zürich in Switzerland.

== History ==
Stallikon is first mentioned in 1124 as Stallinchoven.

The site of Baldern Castle lies within the municipal boundaries, on the Albis ridge. Only earthworks remain, but early chronicles suggest that the castle was built by Ludwig the German, the first king of East Francia, in 853AD, and the castle is known to have been owned by the Counts of Lenzburg in the 12th century. There have been no significant archeological investigations of the site, and the date and reason it was abandoned is unknown.

== Geography ==
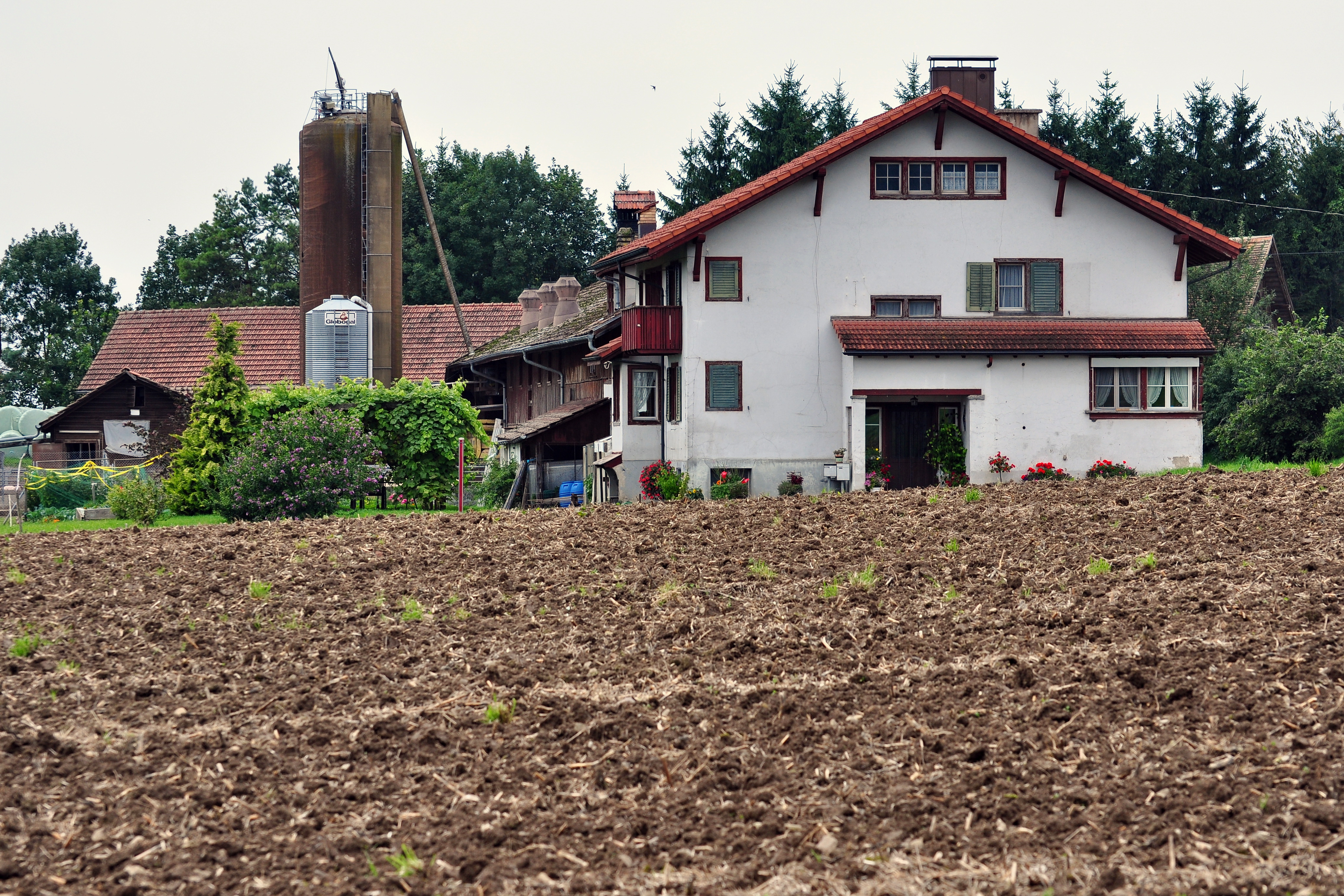
Hamlet Mädikon on Albis hiking trail

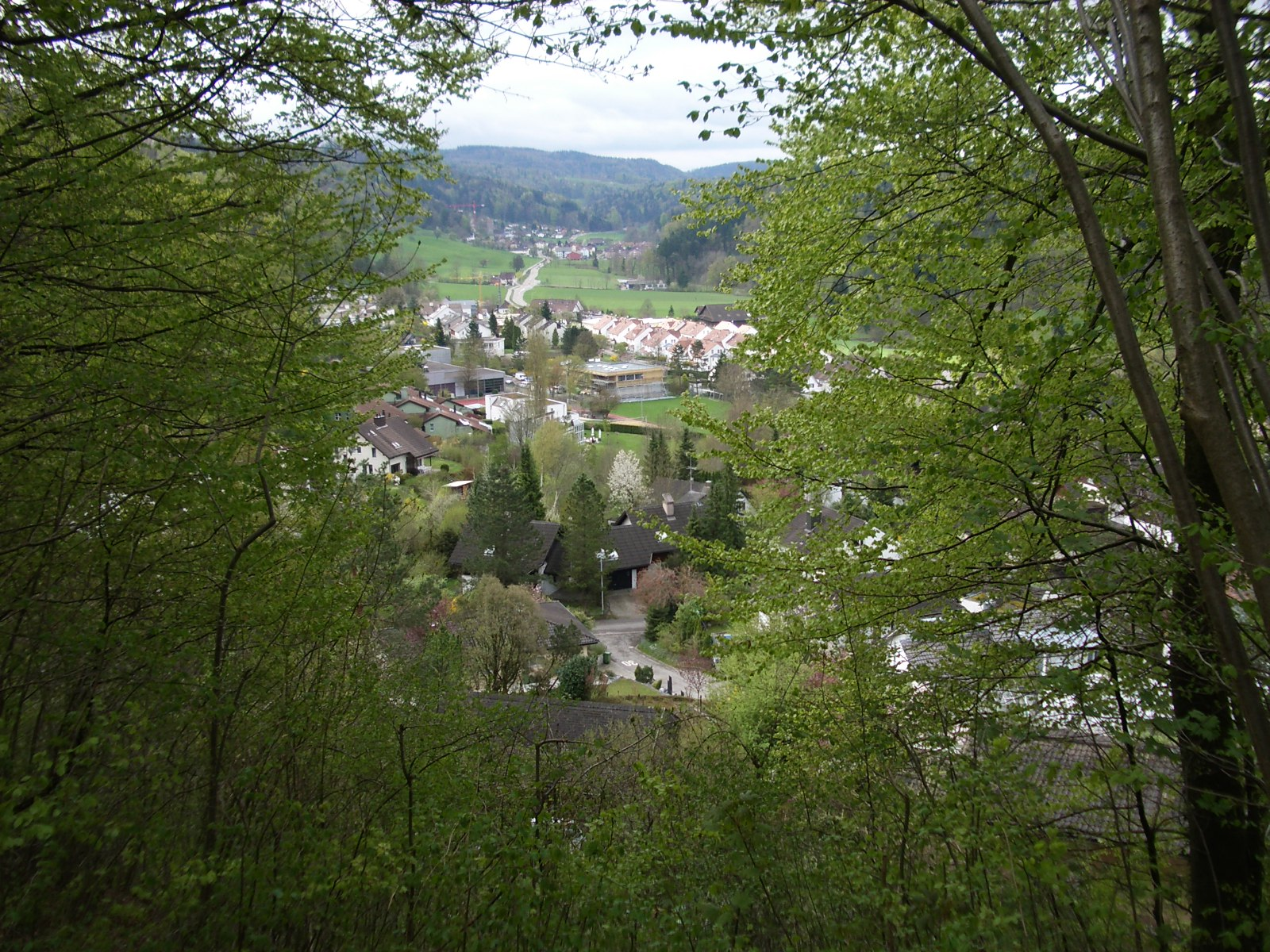
Village Sellenbüren, Stallikon

Aerial view (1966)

Stallikon has an area of 12 km^{2} (4.6 sq mi). Of this area, 39.5% is used for agricultural purposes, while 51.3% is forested. Of the rest of the land, 8.8% is settled (buildings or roads) and the remainder (0.4%) is non-productive (rivers, glaciers or mountains).

The municipality stretches along the Albis hills and includes the Uetliberg. Near the hills it includes the hamlets of Mädikon, Baldern and Buchenegg. The middle of the Reppisch valley is also part of the municipality and includes the village of Stallikon, the hamlets of Tägerst, Gamlikon and Sellenbüren and scattered individual houses.

== Demographics ==
Stallikon has a population (as of 31 December 2020) of 3,783. As of 2007, 13.5% of the population was made up of foreign nationals. Over the last 10 years the population has grown at a rate of 9.5%. Most of the population (as of 2000) speaks German (91.0%), with French being second most common (1.9%) and English being third (1.7%).

In the 2007 election the most popular party was the SVP which received 39.8% of the vote. The next three most popular parties were the FDP (17.4%), the SPS (16.1%) and the Green Party (9.6%).

The age distribution of the population (as of 2000) is children and teenagers (0–19 years old) make up 21.5% of the population, while adults (20–64 years old) make up 69.4% and seniors (over 64 years old) make up 9.1%. In Stallikon about 87.2% of the population (between age 25-64) have completed either non-mandatory upper secondary education or additional higher education (either university or a Fachhochschule).

Stallikon has an unemployment rate of 1.83%. As of 2005, there were 53 people employed in the primary economic sector and about 21 businesses involved in this sector. 221 people are employed in the secondary sector and there are 34 businesses in this sector. 467 people are employed in the tertiary sector, with 79 businesses in this sector. The historical population is given in the following table:

year	population
1643	624^{a}
1772	983
1860	906^{b}
1910	570
1960	748
1990	2,020

^a Including Wettswil
^b Without Wettswil
