= Affoltern District =

Coordinates: 47°16′N 8°28′E

Affoltern District Bezirk Affoltern
- District
- Flag Seal
- Country: Switzerland
- Canton: Zürich
- Capital: Affoltern am Albis

Area
  - Total: 113.01 km^{2} (43.63 sq mi)

Population (31 December 2020)
  - Total: 55,839
  - Density: 494.11/km^{2} (1,279.7/sq mi)
- Time zone: UTC+1 (CET)
  - Summer (DST): UTC+2 (CEST)
- Municipalities: 14

Affoltern District (also known as Knonaueramt or Säuliamt) is one of the twelve districts of the German-speaking canton of Zürich, Switzerland. Its capital is the city of Affoltern am Albis.

== Municipalities ==
Affoltern contains a total of 14 municipalities:

Coat of Arms	Municipality	Population (31 December 2020)	Area, km^{2}
Aeugst am Albis	Aeugst am Albis	2,014	7.87
Affoltern am Albis	Affoltern am Albis	12,289	10.56
Bonstetten	Bonstetten	5,610	7.42
Hausen am Albis	Hausen am Albis	3,801	13.64
Hedingen	Hedingen	3,795	6.59
Kappel am Albis	Kappel am Albis	1,245	7.87
Knonau	Knonau	2,369	6.48
Maschwanden	Maschwanden	641	4.67
Mettmenstetten	Mettmenstetten	5,380	13.11
Obfelden	Obfelden	5,779	7.54
Ottenbach	Ottenbach	2,704	4.98
Rifferswil	Rifferswil	1,148	6.50
Stallikon	Stallikon	3,783	12.01
Wettswil am Albis	Wettswil am Albis	5,281	3.77
Total		55,839	113.01

== See also ==
- Municipalities of the canton of Zürich
