= Hausen am Albis =

- Municipality
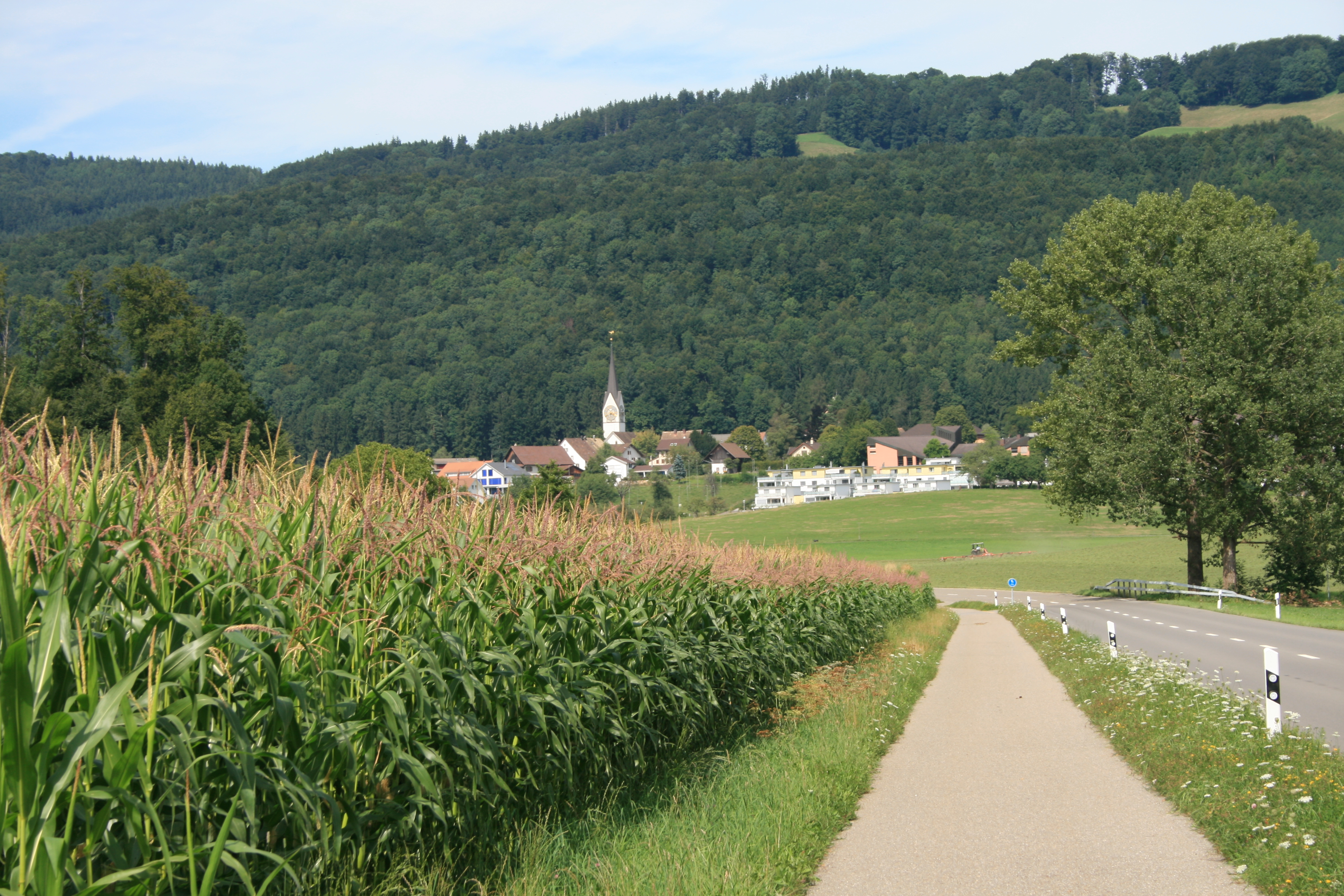

- Flag Coat of arms
- Location of Hausen am Albis
- Location within Switzerland Location within Canton of Zurich
- Coordinates: 47°15′N 8°32′E
- Country: Switzerland
- Canton: Zurich
- District: Affoltern

Area
  - Total: 13.64 km^{2} (5.27 sq mi)
- Elevation: 611 m (2,005 ft)

Population (December 2020)
  - Total: 3,801
  - Density: 278.7/km^{2} (721.7/sq mi)
- Time zone: UTC+01:00 (CET)
  - Summer (DST): UTC+02:00 (CEST)
- Postal code: 8915
- SFOS number: 4
- ISO 3166 code: CH-ZH
- Surrounded by: Aeugst am Albis, Baar (ZG), Hirzel, Horgen, Kappel am Albis, Langnau am Albis, Neuheim (ZG), Rifferswil
- Website: www.hausen.ch

Hausen am Albis is a municipality in the district of Affoltern in the canton of Zürich in Switzerland.

== History ==
Hausen am Albis may be first mentioned in 869 as Husun, though this reference is questionable. In 1242 it was mentioned as Husen.

== Geography ==
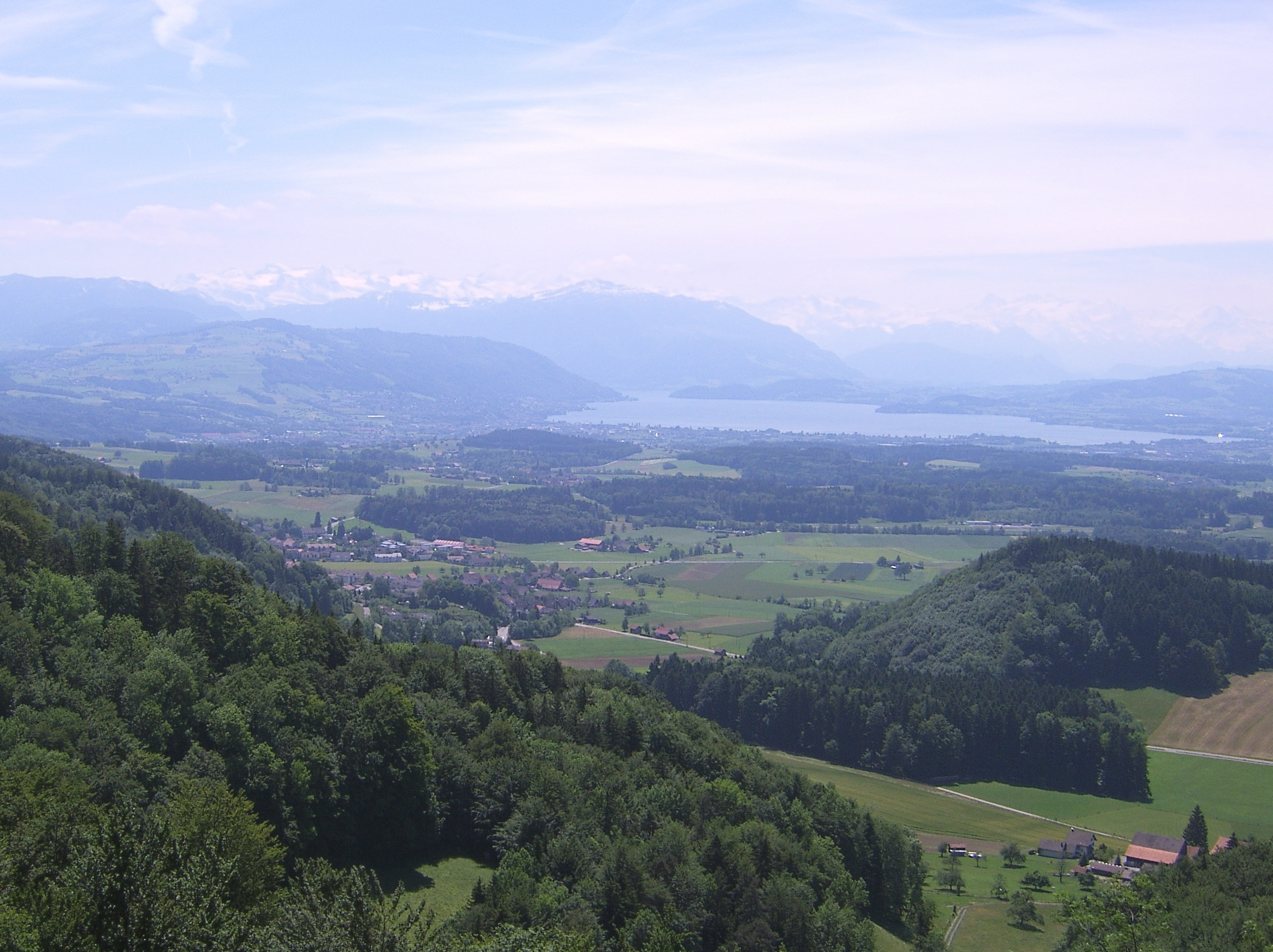
Hausen am Albis seen from Albis hills, Zugersee (lake) in the background.

Aerial view from 500 m by Walter Mittelholzer (1924)

Hausen am Albis has an area of 13.7 km^{2} (5.3 sq mi). Of this area, 58% is used for agricultural purposes, while 29% is forested. Of the rest of the land, 10.7% is settled (buildings or roads) and the remainder (2.3%) is non-productive (rivers, glaciers or mountains).

The municipality is located on the southern side of the Albis pass. It includes sections of the village known as Heisch and Ebertswil as well as hamlets and individual houses. Until 1911 it was known simply as Hausen.

== Demographics ==
Hausen am Albis has a population (as of 31 December 2020) of 3,801. As of 2007, 10.5% of the population was made up of foreign nationals. Over the last 10 years the population has grown at a rate of 7.1%. Most of the population (as of 2000) speaks German (93.6%), with Italian being second most common ( 1.2%) and English being third ( 1.2%).

In the 2007 election the most popular party was the SVP which received 39.3% of the vote. The next three most popular parties were the SPS (18.3%), the Green Party (12.9%) and the FDP (11.7%).

The age distribution of the population (as of 2000) is children and teenagers (0–19 years old) make up 27.6% of the population, while adults (20–64 years old) make up 61.9% and seniors (over 64 years old) make up 10.5%. The entire Swiss population is generally well educated. In Hausen am Albis about 84.8% of the population (between age 25-64) have completed either non-mandatory upper secondary education or additional higher education (either university or a Fachhochschule).

Hausen am Albis has an unemployment rate of 1.18%. As of 2005, there were 139 people employed in the primary economic sector and about 51 businesses involved in this sector. 262 people are employed in the secondary sector and there are 36 businesses in this sector. 373 people are employed in the tertiary sector, with 96 businesses in this sector. The historical population is given in the following table:

year	population
1762	840
1850	1,450
1888	1,335
1900	1,408
1950	1,588
2000	3,040
