= Langnau am Albis =

- Municipality
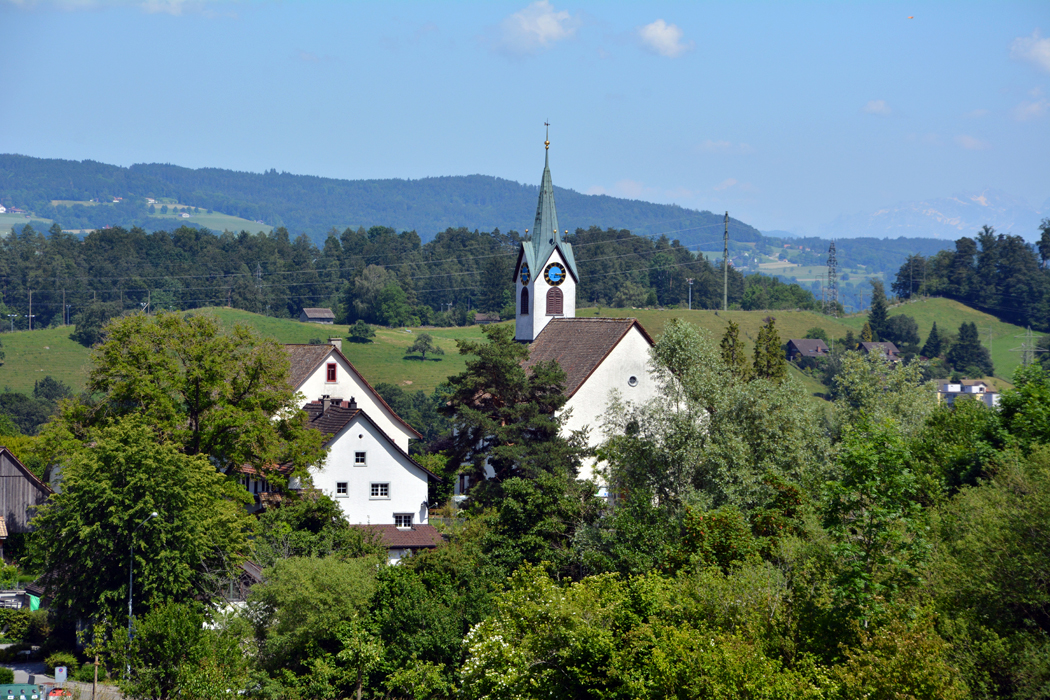

- Flag Coat of arms
- Location of Langnau am Albis
- Location within Switzerland Location within Canton of Zurich
- Coordinates: 47°17′N 8°32′E
- Country: Switzerland
- Canton: Zurich
- District: Horgen

Area
  - Total: 8.66 km^{2} (3.34 sq mi)
- Elevation: 468 m (1,535 ft)

Population (December 2020)
  - Total: 7,902
  - Density: 912/km^{2} (2,360/sq mi)
- Time zone: UTC+01:00 (CET)
  - Summer (DST): UTC+02:00 (CEST)
- Postal code: 8135
- SFOS number: 136
- ISO 3166 code: CH-ZH
- Surrounded by: Adliswil, Aeugst am Albis, Hausen am Albis, Horgen, Rüschlikon, Stallikon, Thalwil
- Website: www.langnauamalbis.ch

Langnau am Albis is a village in the district of Horgen in the canton of Zürich in Switzerland.

== History ==
Langnau am Albis is first mentioned between 1101 and 1150 as Langenow (in a 14th Century copy of the 12th century document). Between 1133 and 1167 it was mentioned as Langenouw.

== Geography ==
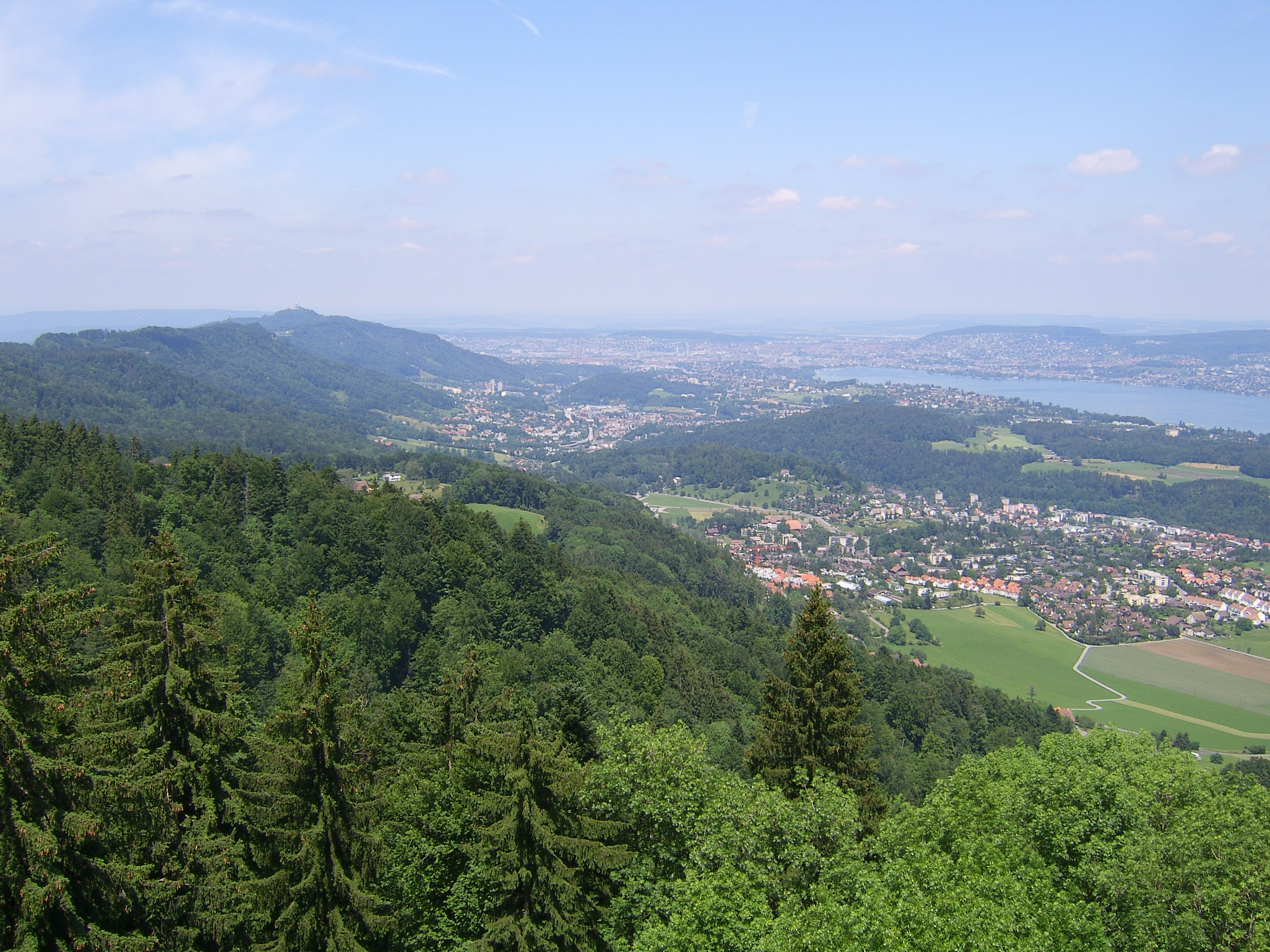
View from the Albis range looking over Langnau am Albis and several other tightly packed villages in the Sihl Valley

Aerial view from 1000 m by Walter Mittelholzer (1919)

Langnau am Albis has an area of 8.7 km^{2} (3.4 sq mi). Of this area, 27.7% is used for agricultural purposes, 48.6% is forested, 22.5% is settled (buildings or roads) and the remainder (1.2%) is non-productive (rivers, glaciers or mountains). In 1996 housing and buildings made up 17.1% of the total area, while transportation infrastructure made up the rest (5.4%). Of the total unproductive area, water (streams and lakes) made up 0.6% of the area. As of 2007 16.6% of the total municipal area was undergoing some type of construction.

It is in the Sihltal valley on the slopes of the Albis mountain range. The area is a rural/suburban community within 10 km (6.2 mi) of the city center of Zürich. Langnau is one of the larger communities in the Canton of Zürich.

== Demographics ==
Langnau am Albis has a population (as of 31 December 2020) of 7,902. As of 2007, 21.7% of the population was made up of foreign nationals. As of 2008 the gender distribution of the population was 49.3% male and 50.7% female. Over the last 10 years the population has grown at a rate of 7.2%. Most of the population (as of 2000) speaks German (84.8%), with Italian being second most common ( 5.3%) and Albanian being third ( 2.0%).

In the 2007, election the most popular party was the SVP which received 35.6% of the vote. The next three most popular parties were the SPS (17.2%), the FDP (16.3%) and the CVP (12.5%).

The age distribution of the population (as of 2000) is 20.8% children and teenagers (0–19 years old), whereas adults (20–64 years old) make up 64.6% and seniors (over 64 years old) make up 14.7%. There are 3 schools in the village: Vorder Zelg is the secondary school, and Wolfgraben and Widmer are the two Primary Schools. The entire Swiss population is generally well educated. In Langnau am Albis about 77.4% of the population (between age 25-64) have completed either non-mandatory upper secondary education or additional higher education (either university or a Fachhochschule). There are 2,926 households in Langnau am Albis.

As of 2008 there were 2,333 Catholics and 2,510 Protestants in Langnau am Albis. In the 2000 census, religion was broken down into several smaller categories. From the census, 42.8% were some type of Protestant, with 40.1% belonging to the Swiss Reformed Church and 2.7% belonging to other Protestant churches. 34.8% of the population were Catholic. 6.6% belonged to another religion (not listed), 2.6% did not give a religion, and 12.2% were atheist or agnostic.

The historical population is given in the following table:

Year	Population
1467	60-70
1634	315
1671	395
1725	577
1809	655
1836	1,108
1850	1,197
1900	1,912
1941	1,749
1950	2,290
1970	4,879
2000	6,595
2020	7,902

== Weather ==
Langnau am Albis has an average of 144.6 days of rain per year and on average receives 1,357 mm (53.4 in) of precipitation. The wettest month is June during which time Langnau am Albis receives an average of 159 mm (6.3 in) of precipitation. During the wettest month, there is precipitation for an average of 14 days.

== Economy ==
The community boasts a high standard of living with a strong school system, plenty of green space, public transportation connecting the surrounding villages and the city of Zürich, a dozen restaurants, two hotels, a leading Tennis and Squash Club, an indoor swimming center, the Football Club Langnau, the Turbine Theater (a small theater in the old turbines of a renovated former textile mill), a public library, and over 45 other clubs and social organizations.

Langnau am Albis has an unemployment rate of 2.43%. As of 2005, there were 61 people employed in the primary economic sector and about 16 businesses involved in this sector. 305 people are employed in the secondary sector and there are 54 businesses in this sector. 851 people are employed in the tertiary sector, with 168 businesses in this sector. As of 2007 38.2% of the working population were employed full-time, and 61.8% were employed part-time.

== Points of interest ==
A major attraction of the town is the Wildpark Langenberg, a zoo in a largely undeveloped location on a wooded hill within the town of Langnau where animals such as the wolf, lynx and ibex can be watched roaming freely. Views of the Cantons Zurich and Zug and the Swiss Alps can be gained from the Hochwachtturm, a 33m tall wooden tower, accessible to the public, located on top of the Albis range about 1.5 km from the Albis pass. Near the town and overlooking Schnabellücken pass are the ruins of Schnabelburg Castle, that was erected in 1150 to guard the road from Zurich to Lucerne (destroyed in 1309).

== Transportation ==
The Langnau-Gattikon railway station is a stop of the Zurich S-Bahn on the line S4 and is a 21-minute ride from Zürich Hauptbahnhof. The Zimmerberg bus line (Zimmerbergbus), provided by the Sihltal Zürich Uetliberg Bahn (SZU), connects the Zimmerberg region and parts of the Sihl Valley.
