= Aeugst am Albis =

- Municipality
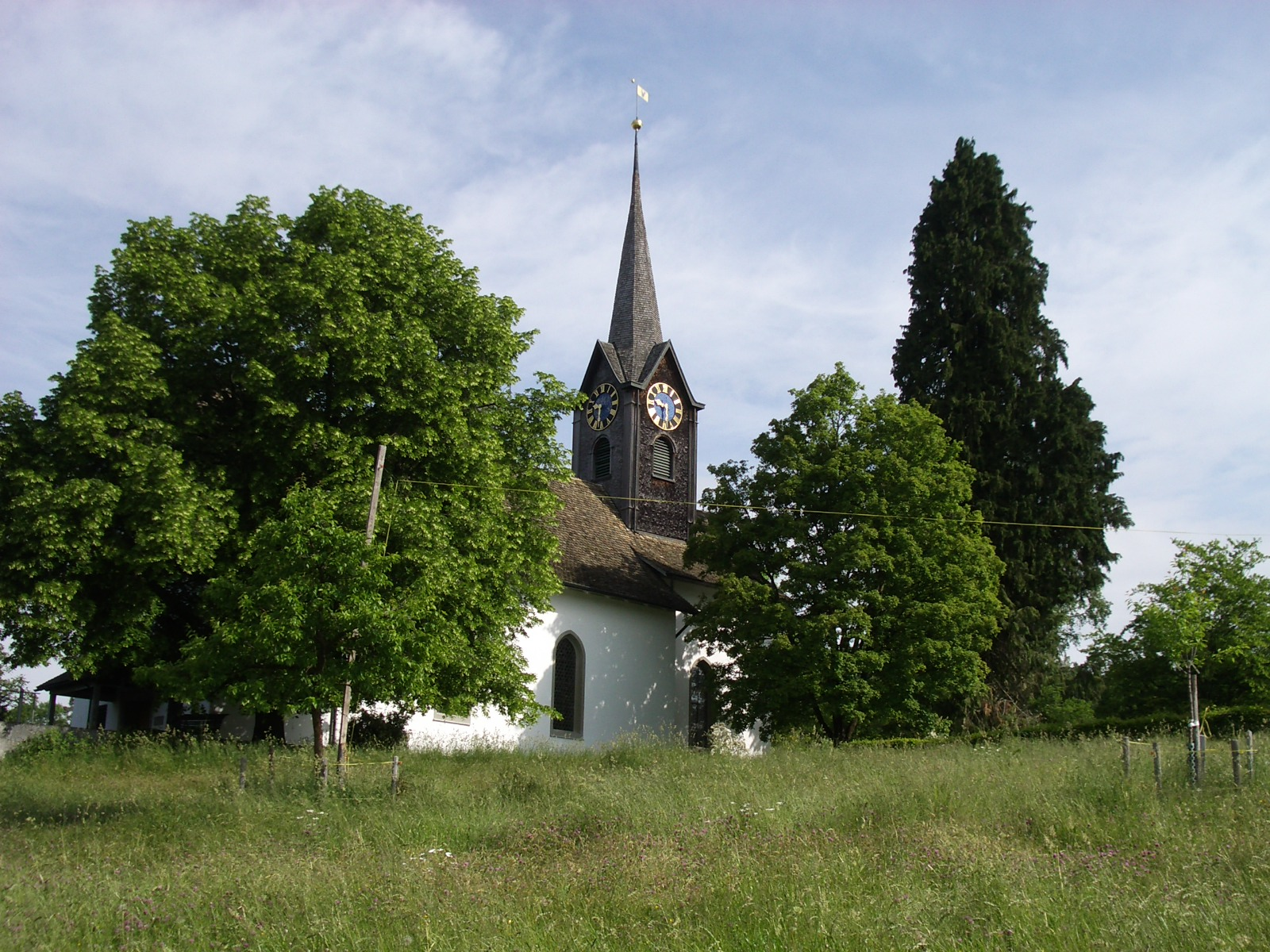

- Flag Coat of arms
- Location of Aeugst am Albis
- Location within Switzerland Location within Canton of Zurich
- Coordinates: 47°16′N 8°29′E
- Country: Switzerland
- Canton: Zurich
- District: Affoltern

Area
  - Total: 7.87 km^{2} (3.04 sq mi)
- Elevation: 696 m (2,283 ft)

Population (2018-12-31)
  - Total: 1,995 (December 2,024)
  - Density: 253/km^{2} (657/sq mi)
- Time zone: UTC+01:00 (CET)
  - Summer (DST): UTC+02:00 (CEST)
- Postal code: 8914
- SFOS number: 1
- ISO 3166 code: CH-ZH
- Surrounded by: Affoltern am Albis, Hausen am Albis, Langnau am Albis, Mettmenstetten, Rifferswil, Stallikon
- Website: www.aeugst-albis.ch

Aeugst am Albis is a municipality in the district of Affoltern in the canton of Zürich in Switzerland.

== History ==
Aeugst am Albis is first mentioned in 876/877 as Ousta. In 1277 it was mentioned as Oeugsten.

== Geography ==
Aerial view from 2000 m by Walter Mittelholzer (1925)

Aeugst am Albis has an area of 7.9 km^{2} (3.1 sq mi). Of this area, 52.7% is used for agricultural purposes, while 31.3% is forested. Of the rest of the land, 11.6% is settled (buildings or roads) and the remainder (4.5%) is non-productive (rivers, glaciers or mountains).

The municipality includes the village of Aeugst, which is located on a southern terrace of the Aeugsterberg. It also includes Wengi and in the upper Reppischtal, the village of Aeugstertal.

== Demographics ==
Aeugst am Albis has a population of 1,995 (as of end 2024). As of 2007, 9.7% of the population was made up of foreign nationals. Over the last 10 years the population has grown at a rate of 17.8%. Most of the population (as of 2000) speaks German (95.2%), with English being second most common ( 1.6%) and French being third ( 0.9%).

Of the 1,995 residents of Aeugst am Albis, only four are non-permanent residents of Switzerland.

After the 2010 elections, the SVP is no longer represented in the municipality council.

The age distribution of the population (as of 2000) is children and teenagers (0–19 years old) make up 24.2% of the population, while adults (20–64 years old) make up 65.5% and seniors (over 64 years old) make up 10.3%. In Aeugst am Albis about 83.5% of the population (between age 25-64) have completed either non-mandatory upper secondary education or additional higher education (either university or a Fachhochschule).

Aeugst am Albis has an unemployment rate of 1.55%. As of 2005, there were 67 people employed in the primary economic sector and about 25 businesses involved in this sector. 17 people are employed in the secondary sector and there are 9 businesses in this sector. 253 people are employed in the tertiary sector, with 55 businesses in this sector. The historical population is given in the following table:

| year | population |
|---|---|
| 1454 | c. 50 |
| 1695 | 408 |
| 1800 | 573 |
| 1900 | 607 |
| 1950 | 650 |
| 2000 | 1,544 |
