= Albis =

Chain of hills in Switzerland

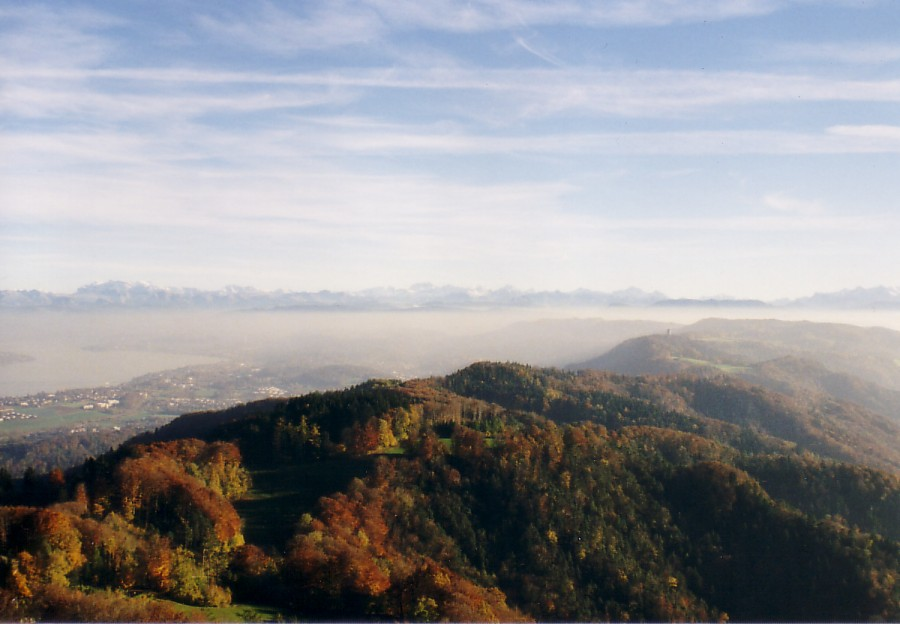
- The Albis chain as seen from the Uetliberg, looking southeast. In the background left the Glärnisch.

Highest point
- Coordinates: 47°17′N 8°30′E

Geography
- Location within Switzerland
- Country: Switzerland
- Canton: Zürich

The Albis is a chain of hills in the Canton of Zürich, Switzerland.

== Localisation ==
A paronamic tower allows to observe the landscape.

== Picture gallery ==
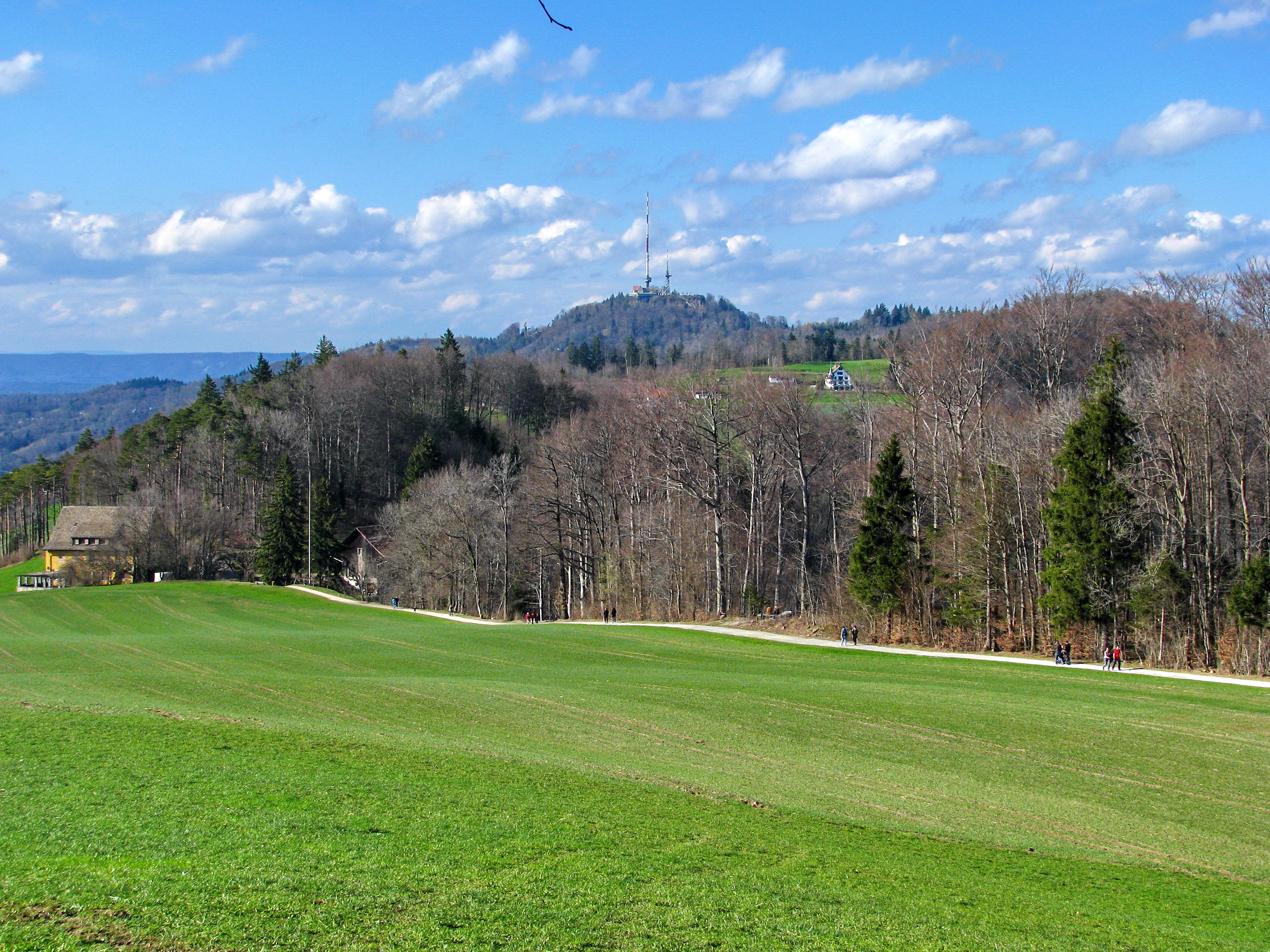
Hiking trail from Felsenegg to Uetliberg as seen near Balderen.

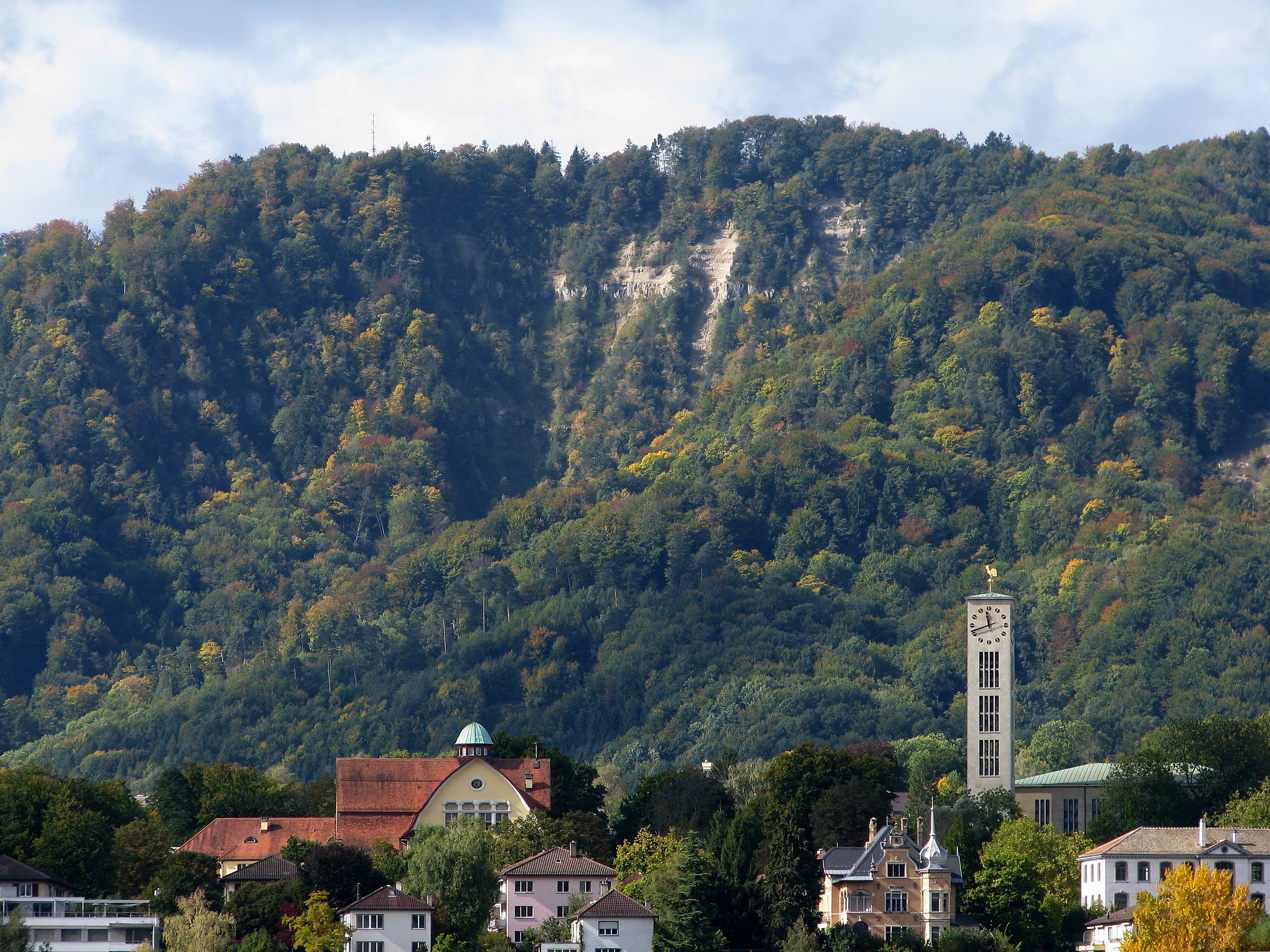
So called Fallätsche at Zürich-Leimbach, Wollishofen quarter in the foreground.

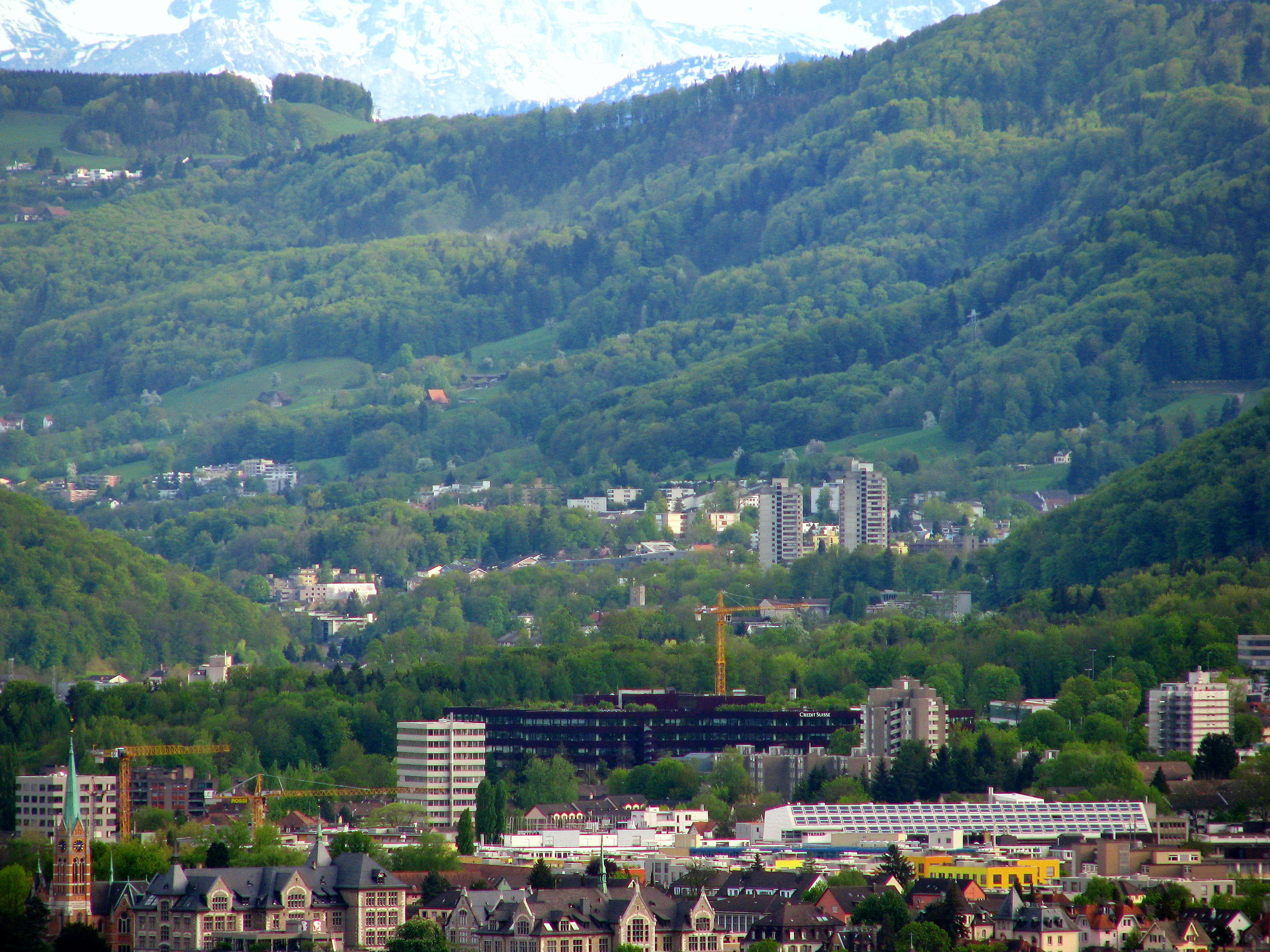
Leimbach (Zürich), lower Sihltal and Albis hills, as seen from Käferberg

360° panorama from Albis Hochwacht
