= Samstagern =

- Former municipality
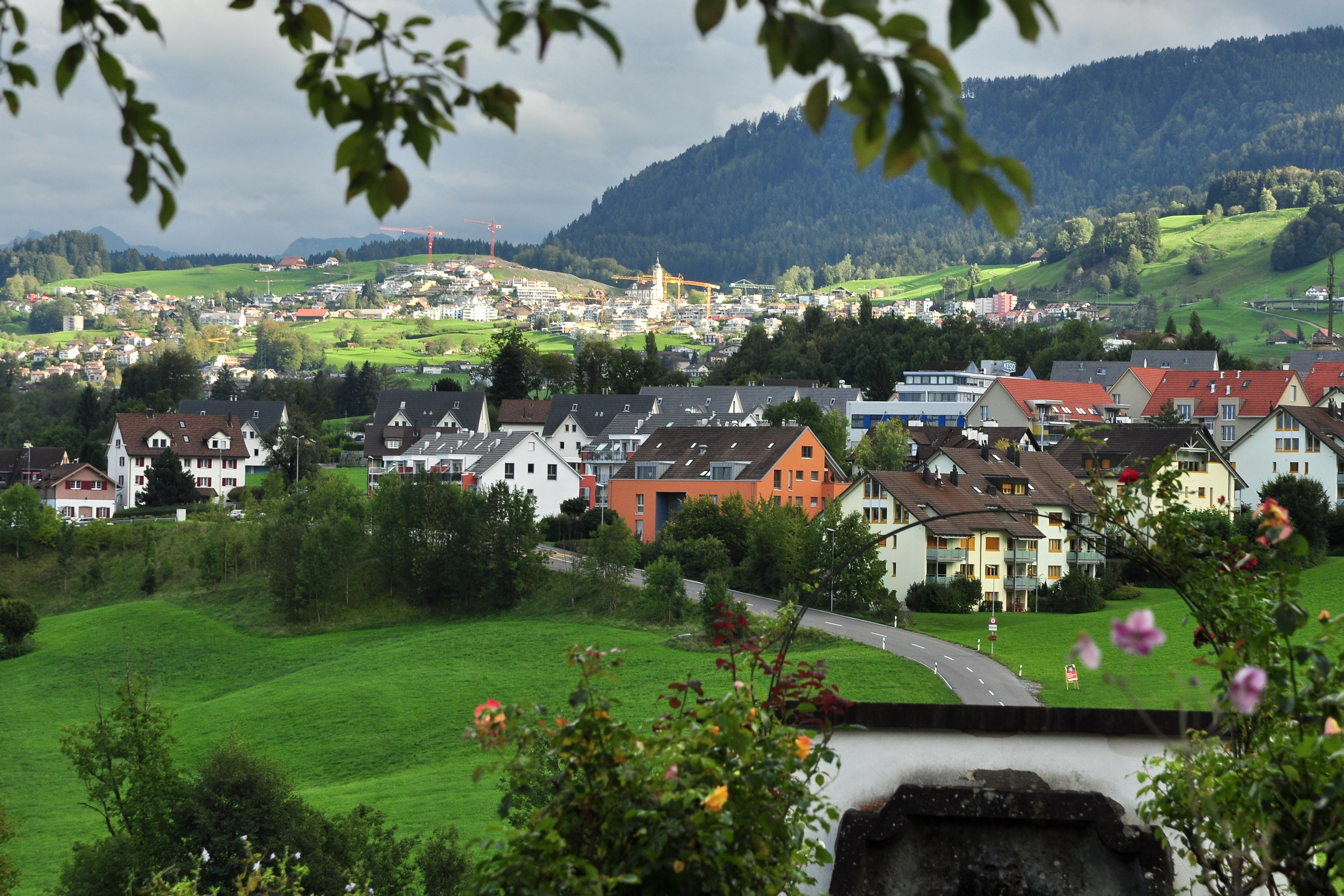
- Location of Samstagern
- Location within Switzerland Location within Canton of Zürich
- Coordinates: 47°11.5′N 8°40.93′E
- Country: Switzerland
- Canton: Zürich
- District: Horgen
- Municipality: Richterswil
- Elevation: 632 m (2,073 ft)

Population (2007)
  - Total: 2,851
- Time zone: UTC+01:00 (CET)
  - Summer (DST): UTC+02:00 (CEST)
- Postal code: 8833
- SFOS number: 0138
- ISO 3166 code: CH-ZH
- Localities: Grüenfeld, Bärenbrüggli
- Surrounded by: Richterswil, Schönenberg, Hütten, Freienbach
- Website: www.richterswil.ch

Samstagern is a village in the municipality Richterswil in the district of Horgen in the canton of Zürich in Switzerland. Hüttnersee is located in the village.

== Demographics ==
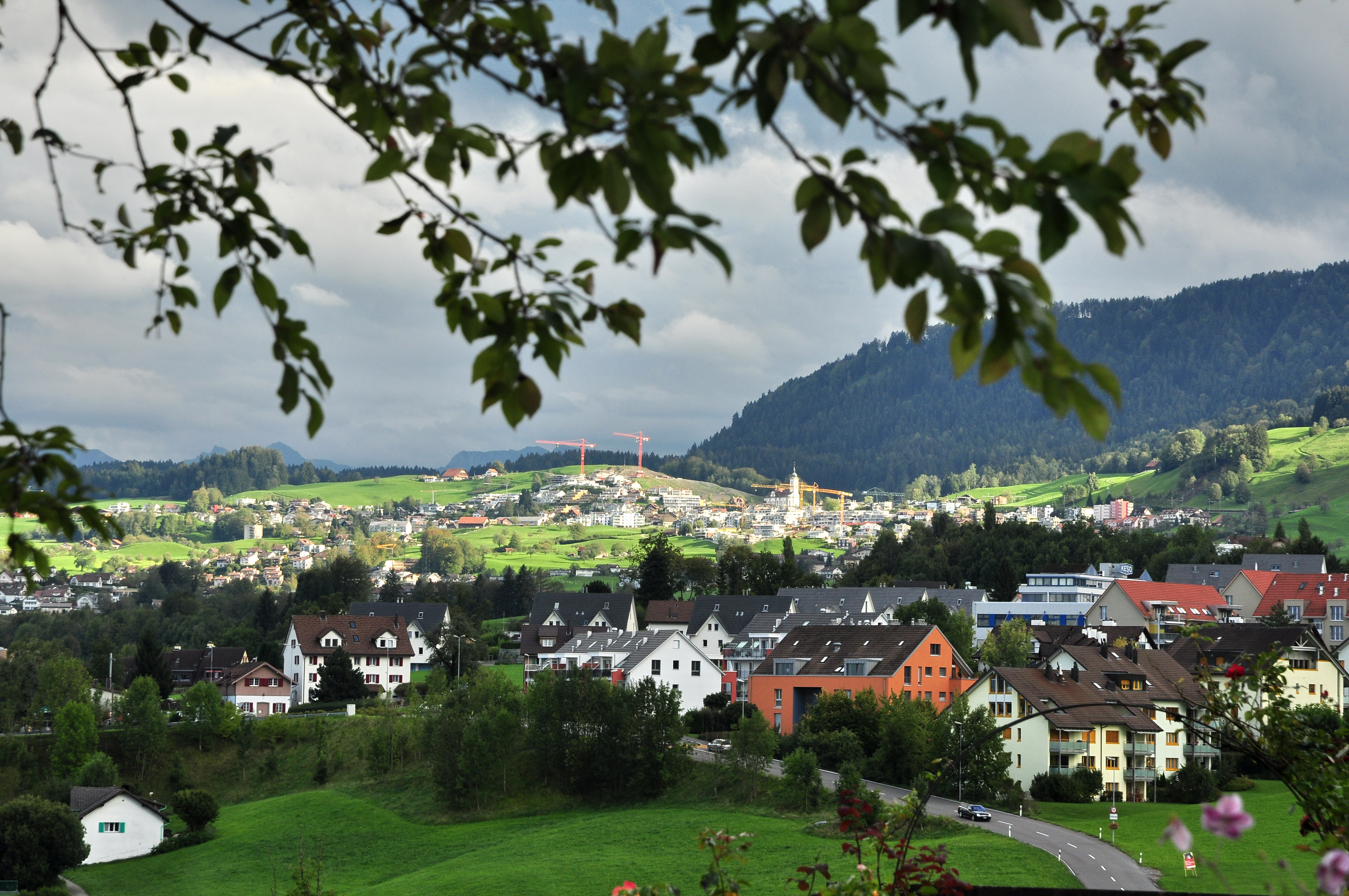

The population is about 2,851 with a rapidly increasing trend. Samstagern is a ribbon development, i.e. Samstagern was established alongside the street between Wädenswil and Einsiedeln. In Samstagern there are some peasant holdings, especially on the outskirts of the village. Its core was concentrated around some Weiler hamlets (Weiler) among them Grüenfeld and Bärenbrüggli. Samstagern belongs to the urban area of the northwestern city of Wädenswil on Lake Zürich. On cultural matters, in Samstagern is a variety of clubs and societies located.

== Education ==
A primary school is located in Samstagern; its schoolhouse (built in 1870) for approximately 190 students in 10 classes has been renewed in 2000. Higher school levels are located in Richterswil.

== Transportation ==
The A3 motorway separates Richterswil and Samstagern. The village has good connections to the public transport system: Samstagern railway station was established in 1877 by the Südostbahn (SOB) to Einsiedeln and Wädenswil (S13) and to Rapperswil by the S-Bahn Zürich line S40. In the morning and in the evening SOB operates to Arth-Goldau and Romanshorn. Local bus lines operate to Pfäffikon (SZ) and its shopping mall called Seedamm-Center, and to Richterswil. The Zimmerberg bus line (Zimmerbergbus), provided by the Sihltal Zürich Uetliberg Bahn (SZU), connects the Zimmerberg region and parts of the Sihl Valley.

== History ==
Ending in 1287, the region around Richterswil was reigned by the noblemen (Freiherren) of Wädenswil, until 1549 it had belonged to the commandry of the Knights Hospitaller in Wädenswil. Samstagern was first mentioned in the year 1659, in 1687 as „uff der Sambstageren“ and in 1773 as „auf der Samstageren“. In 1550, the region has been occupied by the city of Zürich which formed the Landvogtei Wädenswil which was ended with the formation of Swiss cantons by Napoleon Bonaparte. Richterswil-Samstagern was at first part of the Helvetic Republic as the District of Horgen. Following 1803's Act of Mediation, it joined the Grossbezrik Horgen until 1813, and from 1814 to 1831 as Oberamt Wädenswil. Since 1831, Samstagern is part of the municipality Richterswil.
