= Zimmerberg =

Mountain in Switzerland

Coordinates: 47°16′N 8°34′E

The Zimmerberg (el. 769 metres (2,523 ft)) is a mountain and a region in the district of Horgen in the canton of Zurich, Switzerland. Its name comes from the Old High German word zimbar, meaning lumber.

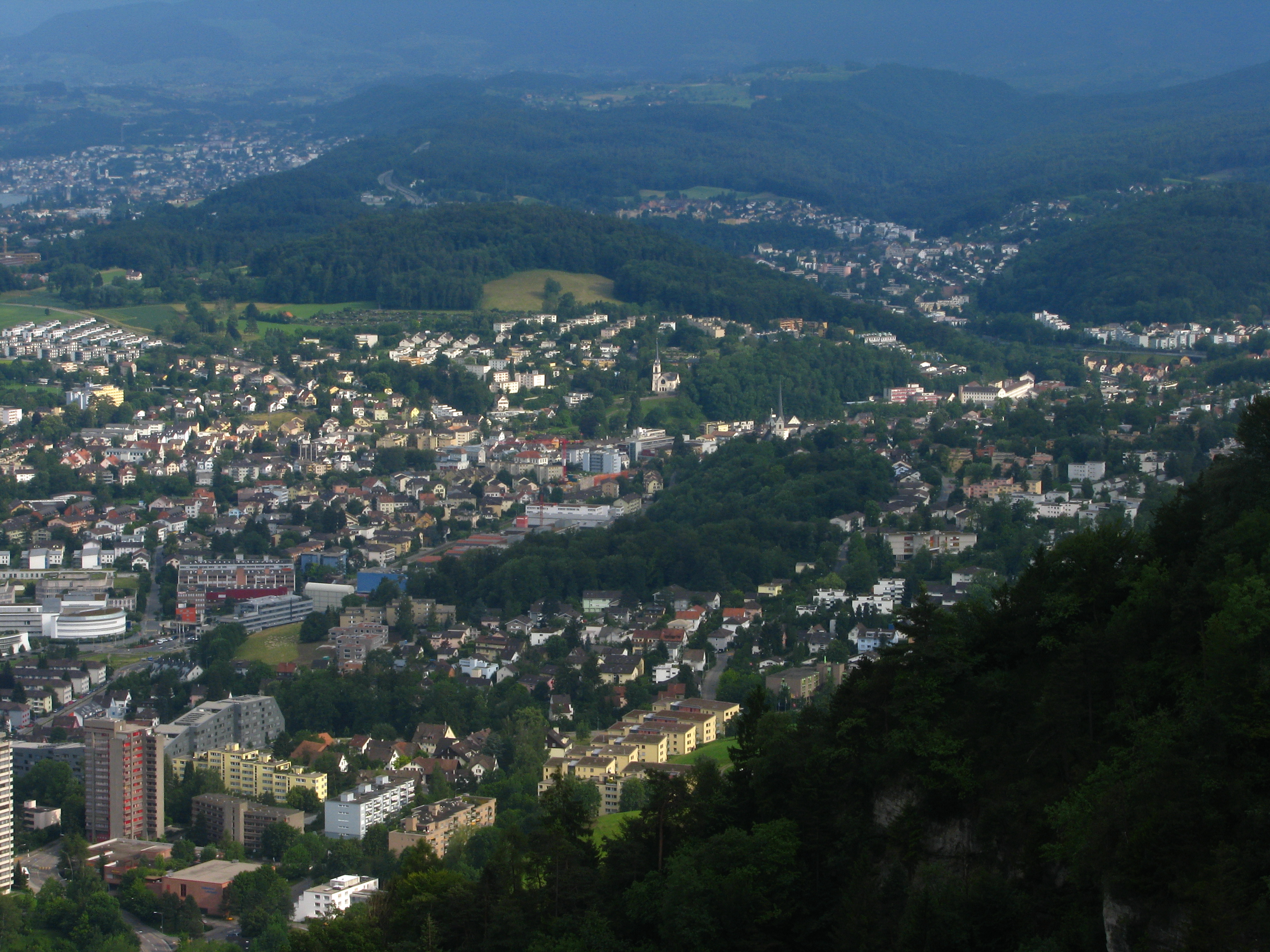
Zimmerberg and Sihl Valley as seen from Felsenegg (April 2010)

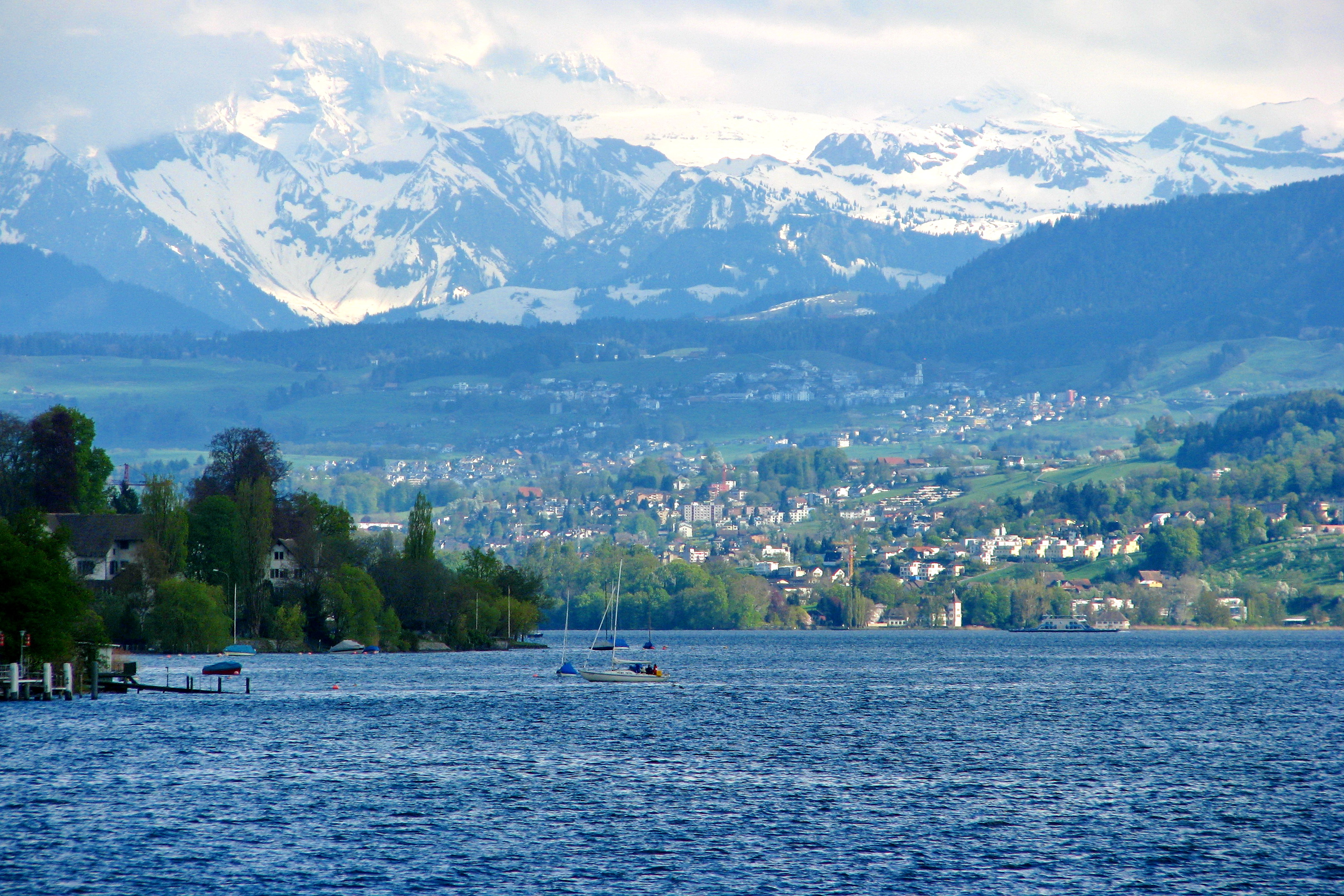
Zürichsee and eastern slope of the Zimmerberg (to the right)

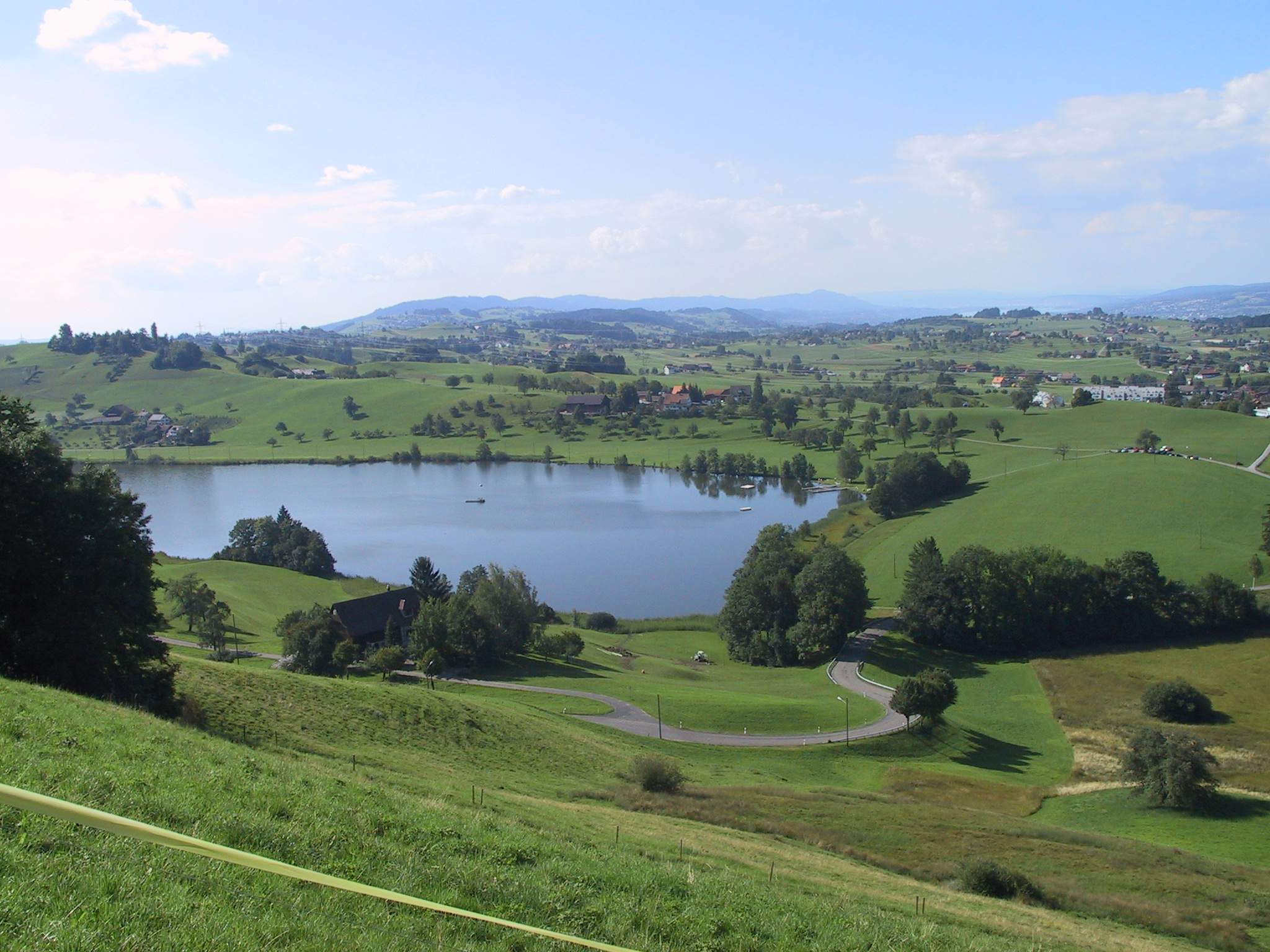
Hüttnersee and Zimmerberg plateau as seen to the northwest, Lake Zürich and Pfannenstiel in the background

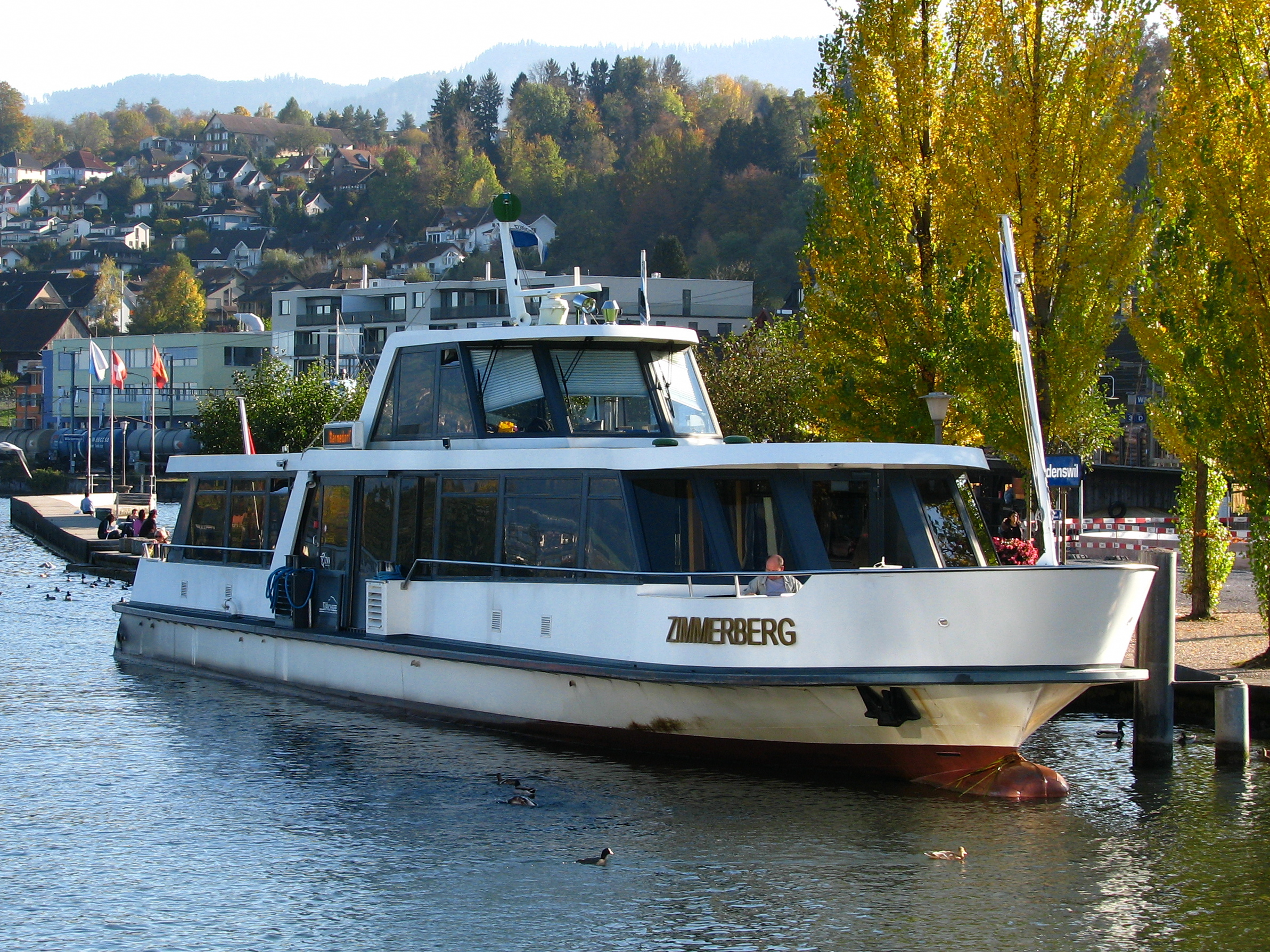
Zürichsee-Schifffahrtsgesellschaft motor ship Zimmerberg

== Geography ==
Zimmerberg mountain is located some 15 km (9.3 mi) in the southeast of the city of Zürich, between Langnau am Albis in the Sihl Valley (German: Sihltal) and Rüschlikon and Horgen on the Lake Zurich, overlooking Sihl valley, the Albis hills, Lake Zurich and Pfannenstiel. Points of interest include Hüttnersee and, on the neighbouring Albis chain, Albishorn (909 metres (2,982 ft)), Bürglen mountain (914.6 metres (3,001 ft)), the observation tower near Schnabelburg, the Albis Pass, Felsenegg and the extensive woods known as Sihlwald. Sihl river borders Zimmerberg on its southern side, on the northeastern side it is bordered by the Lake Zürich. The area is wooded, but also has extensive fields, some cultivated. Being near the city Zurich, the area is a known recreation area.

The area alongside Lake Zürich had been formed as the left moraine of the Ice Age glacier, the bed of which is now the Lake Zürich and the valley of the Sihl river. The soil is mostly a conglomerate of gravel, some of it large, and glacial loess.

== Region Zimmerberg and other meanings ==
The term "Region Zimmerberg" usually refers to the mountain, the area and plateau between Kilchberg–Richterswil–Samstagern on Lake Zürich and partially to the Shil valley. This region includes the municipalities of Hirzel, Horgen, Hütten, Kilchberg, Oberrieden, Richterswil, Rüschlikon, Schönenberg, Thalwil, Wädenswil, and in the Sihl Valley the communities of Adliswil, Langnau am Albis and Sihlbrugg.

Zimmerberg is also used for many organizations on the left shore of the Lake Zurich, such as the Regional Hospital Zimmerberg (German: Spital Zimmerberg) in Horgen or Zimmerberg bus line (Zimmerbergbus) provided by the Sihltal Zürich Uetliberg Bahn. The Zimmerberg, a small motor ship of the Zürichsee-Schifffahrtsgesellschaft, is named after the mountain.

Zimmerberg Base Tunnel is a railway tunnel divided into two parts: The first is about 10 km (6.2 mi) long and links Zürich and Thalwil; the second part will bring the length to about 20 km (12 mi) linking Zürich and Zug.

== History ==
Alamannic grave mounds have been found on the Zimmerberg.

== See also ==
- Zimmerbergbus
