= SZU =

SZU may refer to:

- Sihltal Zürich Uetliberg Bahn, a railway company in Zürich, Switzerland
- Shenzhen University
