= Richterswil =

- Municipality
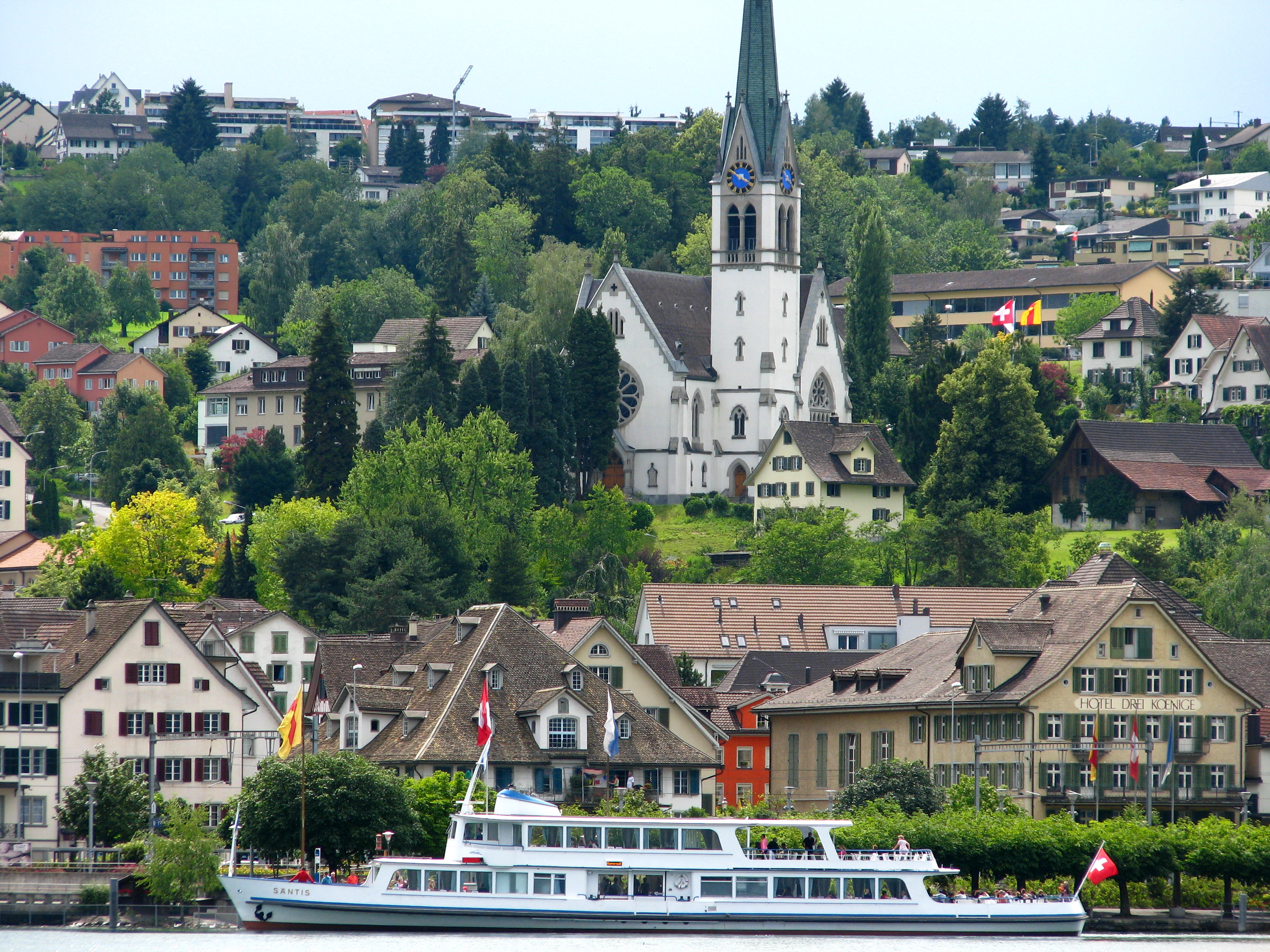

- Flag Coat of arms
- Location of Richterswil
- Location within Switzerland Location within Canton of Zürich
- Coordinates: 47°13′N 8°42′E
- Country: Switzerland
- Canton: Zürich
- District: Horgen

Area
  - Total: 7.54 km^{2} (2.91 sq mi)
- Elevation: 408 m (1,339 ft)

Population (December 2020)
  - Total: 13,670
  - Density: 1,810/km^{2} (4,700/sq mi)
- Time zone: UTC+01:00 (CET)
  - Summer (DST): UTC+02:00 (CEST)
- Postal code: 8805
- SFOS number: 138
- ISO 3166 code: CH-ZH
- Localities: Richterswil, Burghalden, Samstagern
- Surrounded by: Freienbach (SZ), Hütten, Männedorf, Schönenberg, Stäfa, Wädenswil, Wollerau (SZ)
- Website: www.richterswil.ch

Richterswil (Swiss German: Richtärschwil or Richti) is a municipality in the district of Horgen in the canton of Zürich in Switzerland.

== History ==
Richterswil is first mentioned in 1265 as Richtliswile.

Aerial view from 200 m by Walter Mittelholzer (1919)

During the 17th Century, a series of peasant revolts broke out across Switzerland. One of these revolts, the 1645/46 Wädenswiler Steueraufstand (Wädenswil tax revolt), occurred around Lake Zürich and involved the village of Richterswil. The Richterswiler Weibel Rudolf Goldschmid was one of the leaders of the revolt who was executed in Zürich following the failure of the revolt. During the first Villmergen war (1656) Richterswil was invaded by an army from Schwyz. During the second Villmergen war, the newly built fortifications above the city, prevented another invasion. Under the French established Helvetic Republic Richterswil was part of the District of Horgen, and had a higher tax rate than surrounding villages. As part of this higher tax, during the War of the Second Coalition (1799), it was forced to house French troops. Following the unsuccessful uprising in 1804 (Bockenkrieg) against Zürich, Richterswil was punished severely.

From 1803 to 1831 it was part of the District of Wädenswil, but since 1831 has belonged to the District of Horgen. Since 1831, Samstagern has been part of the municipality Richterswil. In 1869 the majority of citizens of Richterswil voted against the new democratic cantonal constitution.

== Geography ==
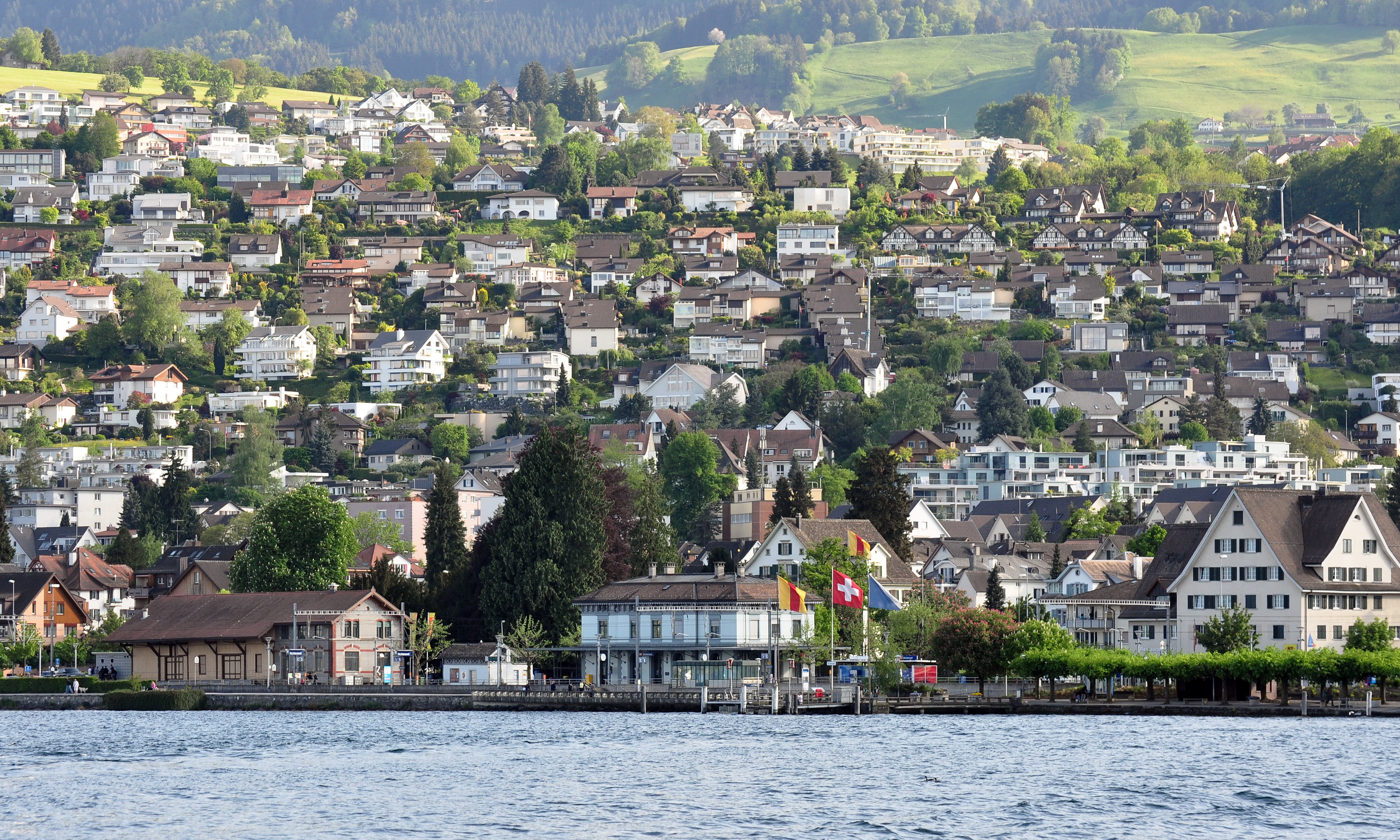
Richterswil as seen from Lake Zürich

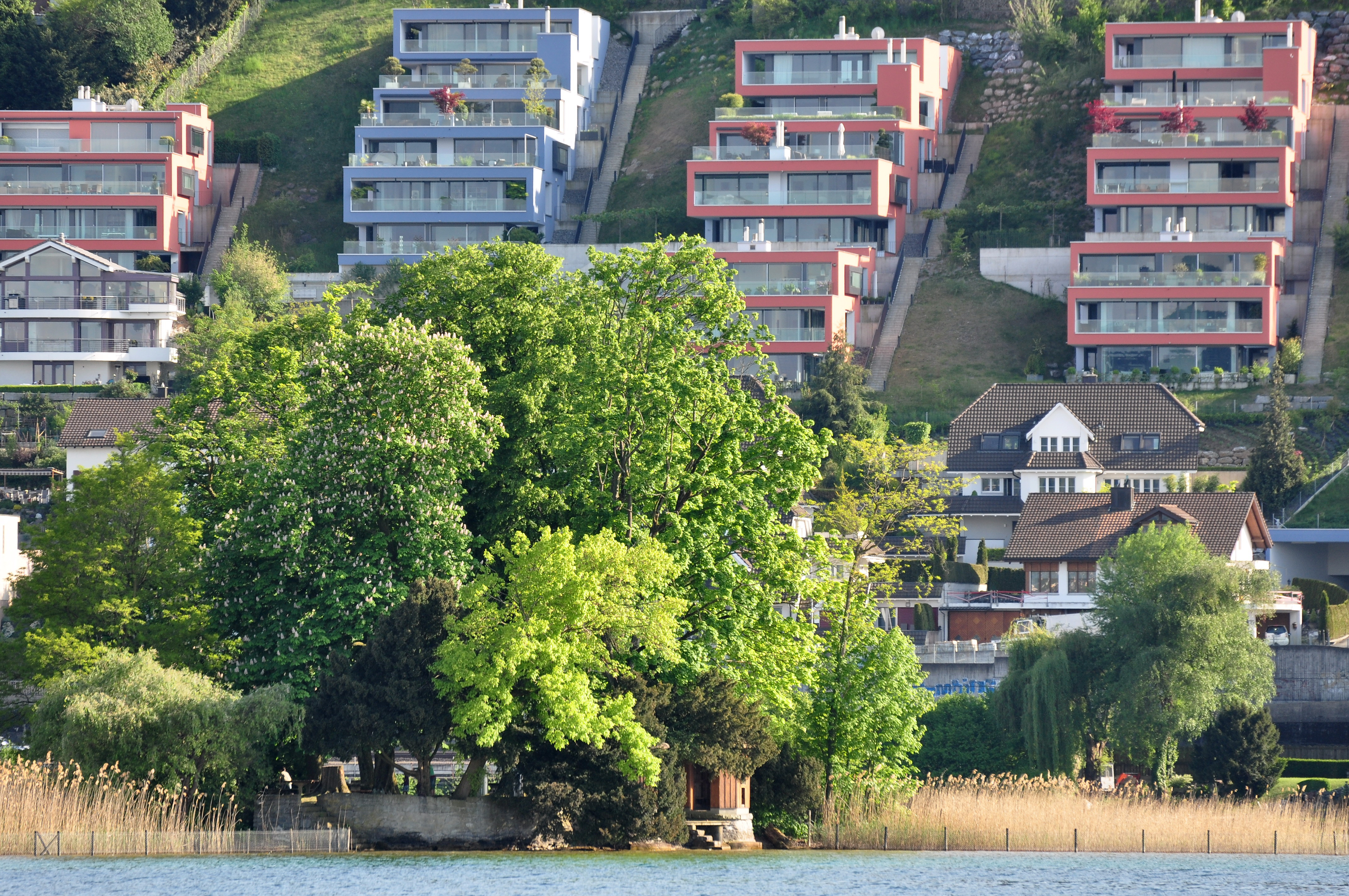
Schönenwirt island

Richterswil has an area of 7.6 km^{2} (2.9 sq mi). Of this area, 54.7% is used for agricultural purposes, while 7.8% is forested. Of the rest of the land, 36.6% is settled (buildings or roads) and the remainder (0.9%) is non-productive (rivers, glaciers or mountains). In 1996 housing and buildings made up 26.4% of the total area, while transportation infrastructure made up the rest (10.2%). Of the total unproductive area, water (streams and lakes) made up 0.5% of the area. As of 2007 34.8% of the total municipal area was undergoing some type of construction.

The northern shore of Hüttnersee is located in the municipality. It is located on the left shore of Lake Zürich. It includes the sections known as Dorf and Berg (which is part of Samstagern village).

The Sternenweiher reservoir is also located in Richterswil.

== Demographics ==
Richterswil has a population (as of 31 December 2020) of 13,670. As of 2007, 17.6% of the population was made up of foreign nationals. As of 2008 the gender distribution of the population was 49% male and 51% female. Over the last 10 years the population has grown at a rate of 18.7%. Most of the population (as of 2000) speaks German (89.0%), with Italian being second most common ( 2.9%) and English being third ( 1.8%).

In the 2007 election the most popular party was the SVP which received 34.5% of the vote. The next three most popular parties were the SPS (17.4%), the FDP (15%) and the CSP (10.6%).

The age distribution of the population (as of 2000) is children and teenagers (0–19 years old) make up 23.8% of the population, while adults (20–64 years old) make up 62.6% and seniors (over 64 years old) make up 13.6%. In Richterswil about 80.8% of the population (between age 25–64) have completed either non-mandatory upper secondary education or additional higher education (either university or a Fachhochschule). There are 4452 households in Richterswil.

Richterswil has an unemployment rate of 2.41%. As of 2005, there were 90 people employed in the primary economic sector and about 32 businesses involved in this sector. 1,178 people are employed in the secondary sector and there are 109 businesses in this sector. 1684 people are employed in the tertiary sector, with 315 businesses in this sector. As of 2007 48.8% of the working population were employed full-time, and 51.3% were employed part-time.

As of 2008 there were 3,966 Catholics and 4,524 Protestants in Richterswil. In the 2000 census, religion was broken down into several smaller categories. From the census, 45% were some type of Protestant, with 41.8% belonging to the Swiss Reformed Church and 3.2% belonging to other Protestant churches. 34.5% of the population were Catholic. Of the rest of the population, 2.9% were Muslim, 4.5% belonged to another religion (not listed), 3.2% did not give a religion, and 12.2% were atheist or agnostic.

The historical population of the town is as follows:

year	population
1634	893
1850	3,203
1920	4,527
1940	4,554
1970	7,380
1990	9,882
2000	10,430
2010	12,336
2020	13,647

== Transport ==
The municipality is located on the A3 motorway.

The municipality is served by four railway stations. Richterswil station is on the main Lake Zürich left-bank line and is a stop of the Zürich S-Bahn services S2 and S8; it is a 33-minute ride from Zürich Hauptbahnhof. Burghalden station, Grüenfeld station and Samstagern station are all on the Wädenswil to Einsiedeln line, and are stops of the S13 service.

The Zimmerberg bus line (Zimmerbergbus), provided by the Sihltal Zürich Uetliberg Bahn (SZU), connects the Zimmerberg region and parts of the Sihl valley.

== Notable residents ==
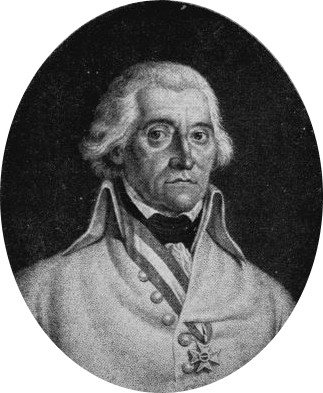
Friedrich von Hotze

- Friedrich Freiherr von Hotze (1739 in Richterswil – 1799) a Swiss-born general in the Austrian army during the French Revolutionary Wars
- John Caspar Wild (1804 in Richterswil – 1846) American painter and lithographer
- Margrit Rainer (1914–1982) a Swiss comedian, radio personality and stage and film actress
- Annelies Štrba (born 1947) a Swiss multimedia artist, who works with video, photography and digital media; lives in Richterswil
- André Blattmann (born 1956 in Richterswil) a Swiss Lieutenant General and Chief of the Armed Forces 2009-2016
- Marina Keller (born 1984 in Richterswil) a Swiss football player currently playing for FC Zürich
- Julia Jakob (born 1991) a Swiss orienteer
