= Hütten, Switzerland =

Hütten
- Former municipality
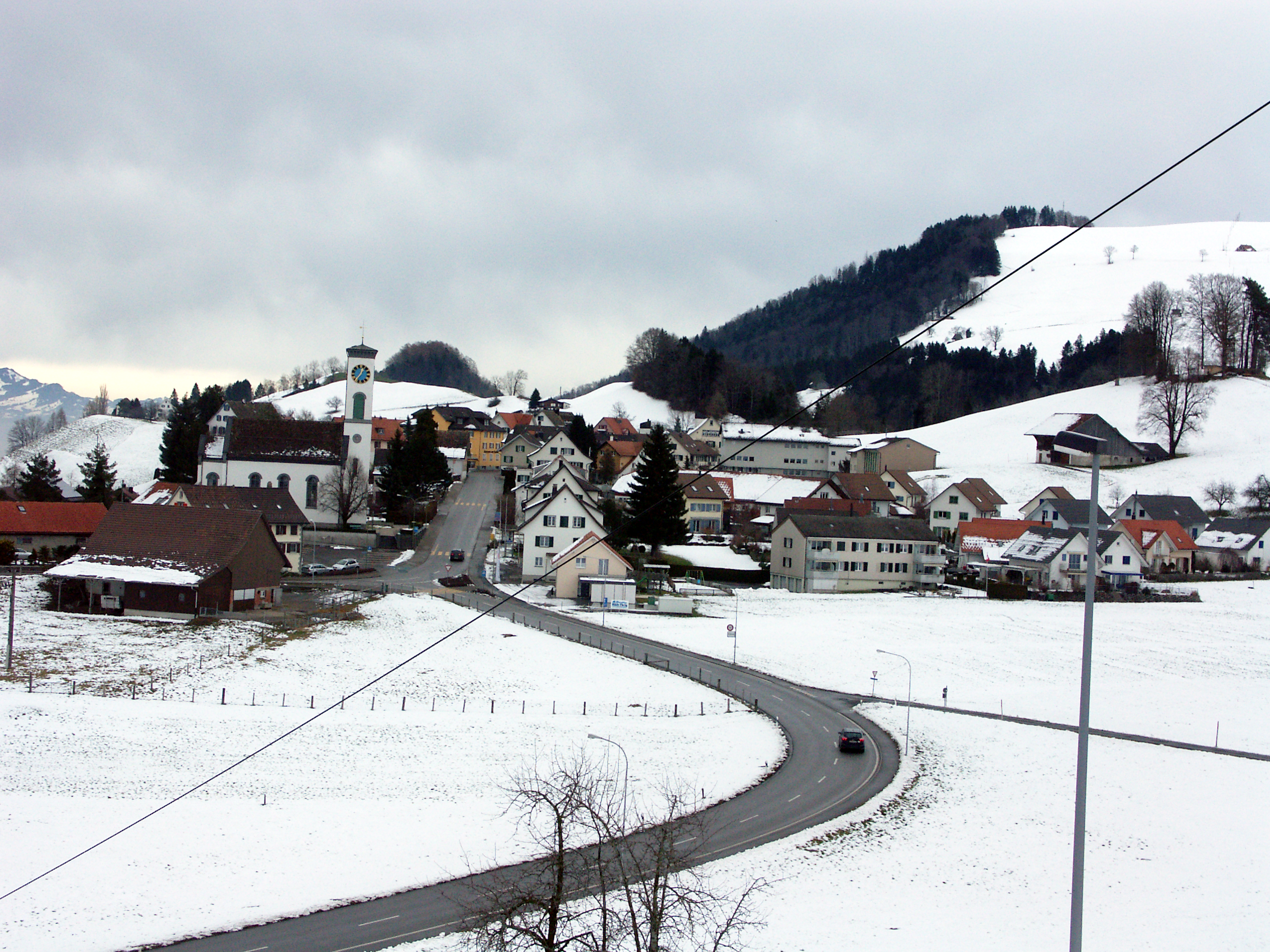

- Flag Coat of arms
- Location of Hütten
- Location within Switzerland Location within Canton of Zurich
- Coordinates: 47°10′N 8°40′E
- Country: Switzerland
- Canton: Zurich
- District: Horgen

Government
  - Mayor: Verena Dressler

Area
  - Total: 7.24 km^{2} (2.80 sq mi)
- Elevation: 729 m (2,392 ft)

Population (December 2020)
  - Total: 888
  - Density: 123/km^{2} (318/sq mi)
- Time zone: UTC+01:00 (CET)
  - Summer (DST): UTC+02:00 (CEST)
- Postal code: 8825
- SFOS number: 134
- ISO 3166 code: CH-ZH
- Surrounded by: Feusisberg (SZ), Menzingen (ZG), Oberägeri (ZG), Richterswil (ZH), Schönenberg (ZH), Wollerau (SZ)
- Website: www.huetten.ch

Hütten (German pronunciation: [ˈhʏtn̩]) is a former municipality in the district of Horgen in the canton of Zürich in Switzerland. On 1 January 2019 the former municipalities of Hütten and Schönenberg merged into the municipality of Wädenswil.

== History ==
Hütten is first mentioned in 1270 as ze dien Hütten.

== Geography ==
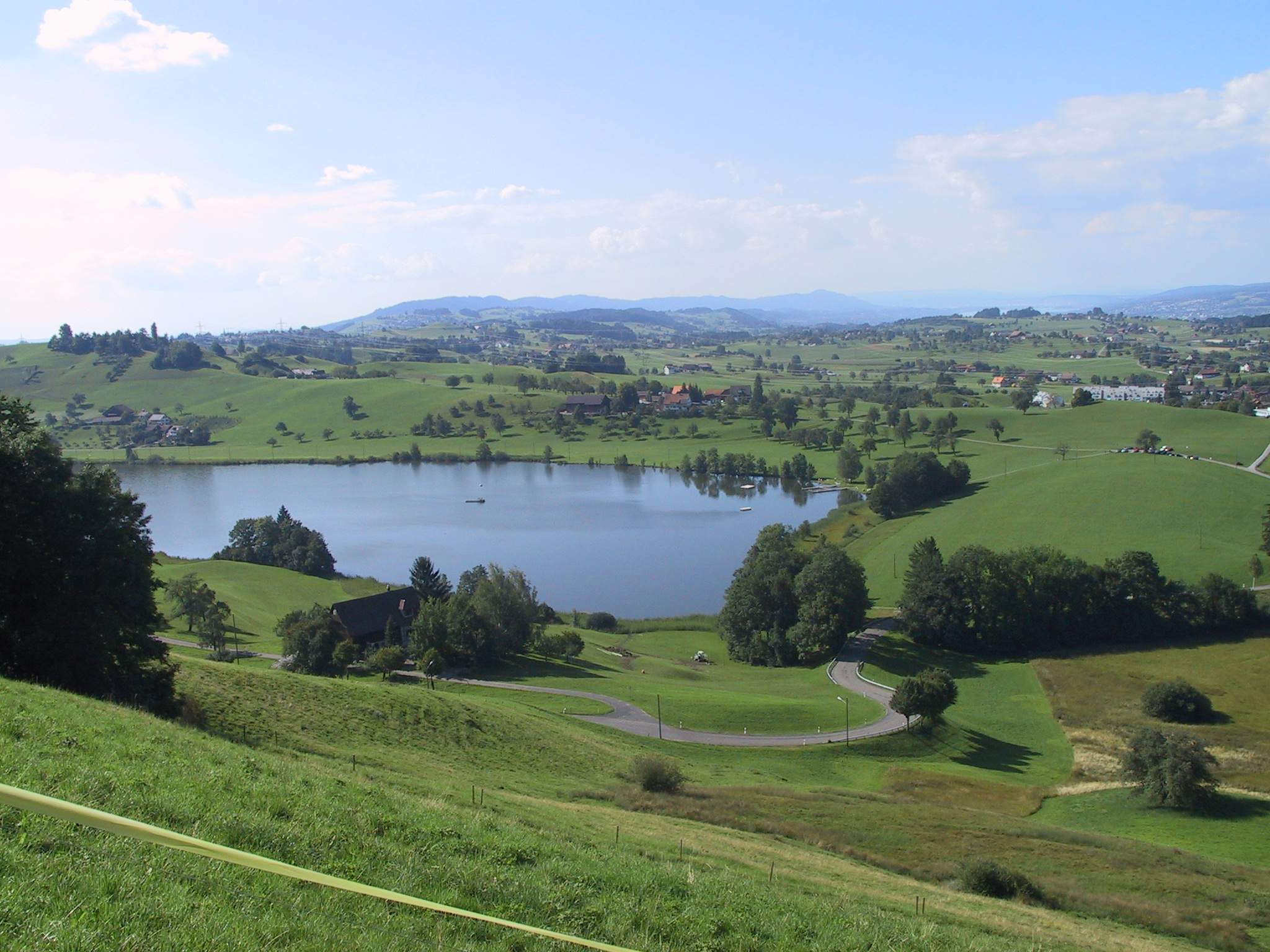
Hüttnersee (Hütten lake) on the Zimmerberg plateau

Hütten has an area of 7.2 km^{2} (2.8 sq mi). Of this area, 52.9% is used for agricultural purposes, while 36.7% is forested. Of the rest of the land, 5.5% is settled (buildings or roads) and the remainder (4.8%) is non-productive (rivers, glaciers or mountains). In 1996 housing and buildings made up 2.8% of the total area, while transportation infrastructure made up the rest (2.8%). Of the total unproductive area, water (streams and lakes) made up 2.8% of the area. As of 2007 1.8% of the total municipal area was undergoing some type of construction.

The municipality is near the Hüttnersee, a small lake shared with Richterswil. It is a linear village (Strassendorf) made up of hamlets and farm houses along both sides of the Sihl.

== Demographics ==
Hütten has a population (as of 31 December 2020) of 888. As of 2007, 6.5% of the population was made up of foreign nationals. As of 2008 the gender distribution of the population was 52.9% male and 47.1% female. Over the last 10 years the population has grown at a rate of 7.4%. Most of the population (as of 2000) speaks German (93.1%), with English being second most common ( 1.5%) and Albanian being third ( 1.3%).

In the 2007 election the most popular party was the SVP which received 55.7% of the vote. The next three most popular parties were the CSP (11%), the SPS (9.6%) and the CVP (7.3%).

The age distribution of the population (as of 2000) is children and teenagers (0–19 years old) make up 29.5% of the population, while adults (20–64 years old) make up 56.9% and seniors (over 64 years old) make up 13.6%. The entire Swiss population is generally well educated. In Hütten about 71% of the population (between age 25-64) have completed either non-mandatory upper secondary education or additional higher education (either university or a Fachhochschule). There are 327 households in Hütten.

Hütten has an unemployment rate of 2.11%. As of 2005, there were 93 people employed in the primary economic sector and about 35 businesses involved in this sector. 31 people are employed in the secondary sector and there are 11 businesses in this sector. 101 people are employed in the tertiary sector, with 24 businesses in this sector. As of 2007 38% of the working population were employed full-time, and 62% were employed part-time.

As of 2008 there were 359 Catholics and 413 Protestants in Hütten. In the 2000 census, religion was broken down into several smaller categories. From the census, 49.5% were some type of Protestant, with 46.2% belonging to the Swiss Reformed Church and 3.4% belonging to other Protestant churches. 36.5% of the population were Catholic. Of the rest of the population, 0% were Muslim, 2.8% belonged to another religion (not listed), 4.9% did not give a religion, and 5.9% were atheist or agnostic.

The historical population is given in the following table:

year	population
1850	718
1900	576
1920	523
1950	563
2000	860

== Transportation ==
The Zimmerberg bus line (Zimmerbergbus), provided by the Sihltal Zürich Uetliberg Bahn (SZU), connects the Zimmerberg region and parts of the Sihl valley.
