= Sihl Valley =

River valley in Switzerland

Coordinates: 47°16′N 8°34′E

Sihl Valley (German: Sihltal) is a river valley and belongs to the Zimmerberg-Sihltal region located in the district of Horgen in the canton of Zurich, Switzerland. Commonly Sihltal is used as the name of the Lower Sihl Valley, i.e. the area in the southwest of the city of Zürich.

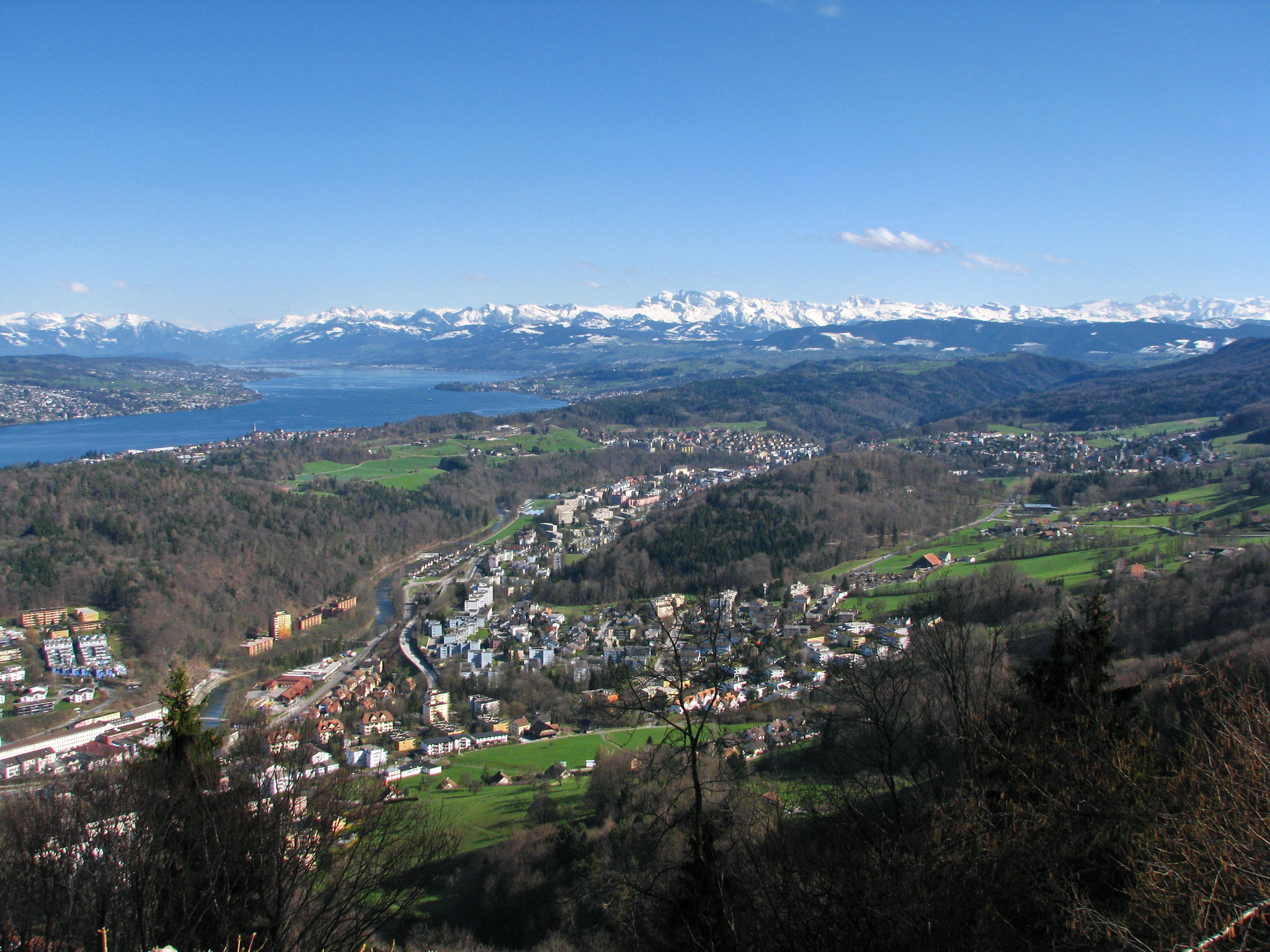
Sihl valley to the southeast, Adliswil, Langnau am Albis, Zimmerberg and Lake Zürich as seen from Felsenegg

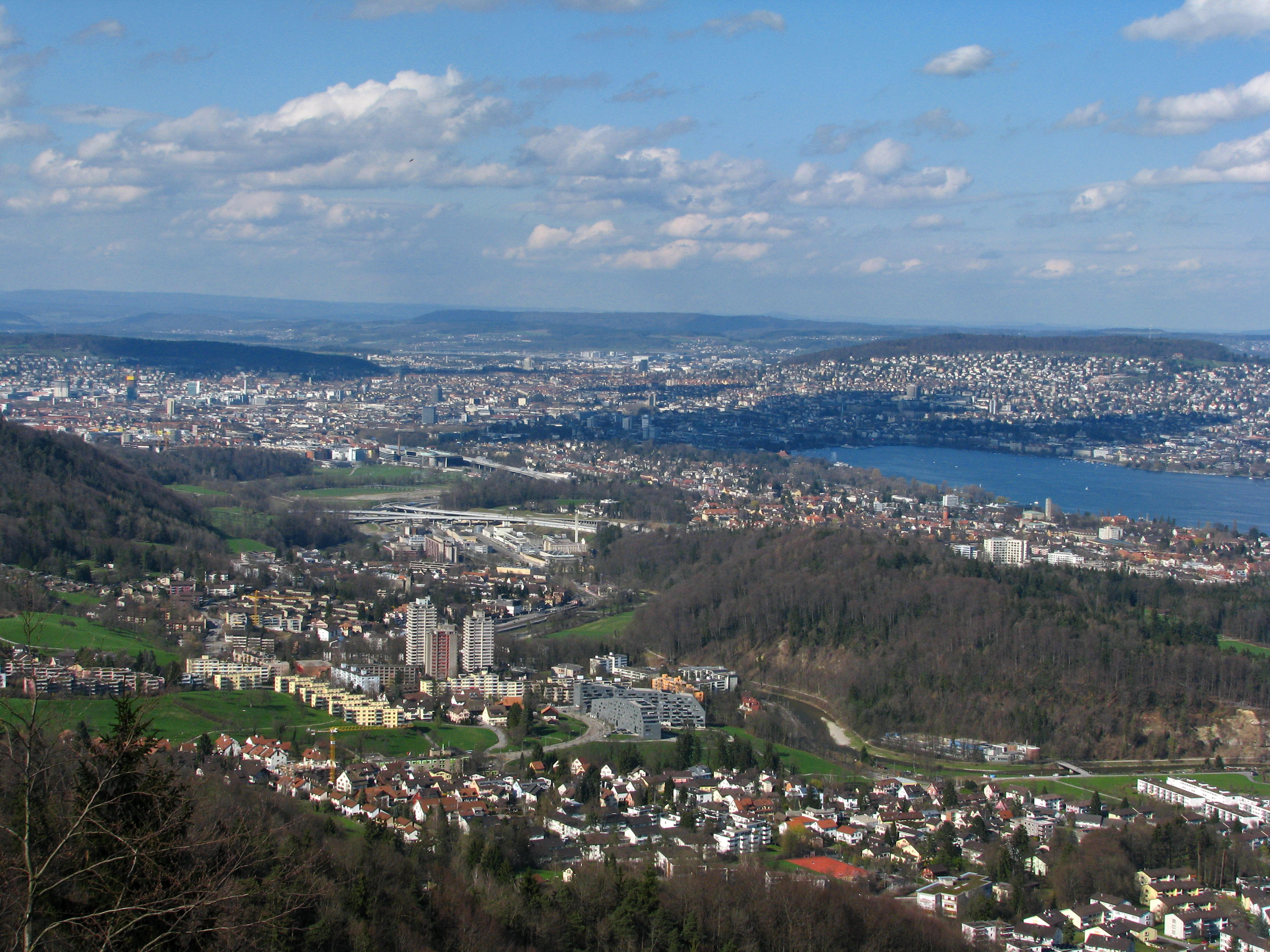
Sihl valley to the northwest, Adliswil, Zürich-Leimbach, inner city, Käferberg (to the left) and Zürichberg, and Limmat Valley, as seen from Felsenegg

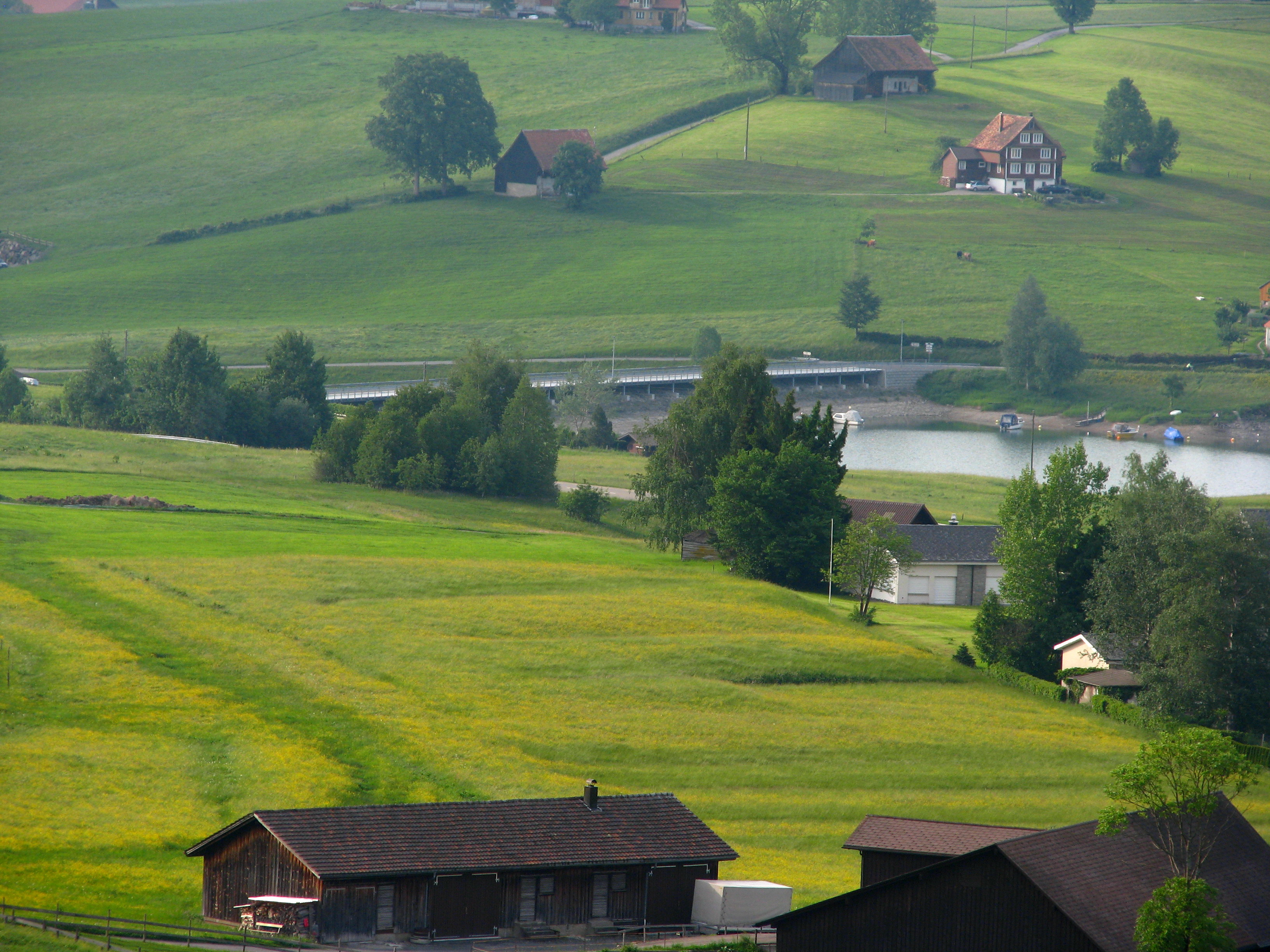
Sihlsee dam and effluence of the Sihl

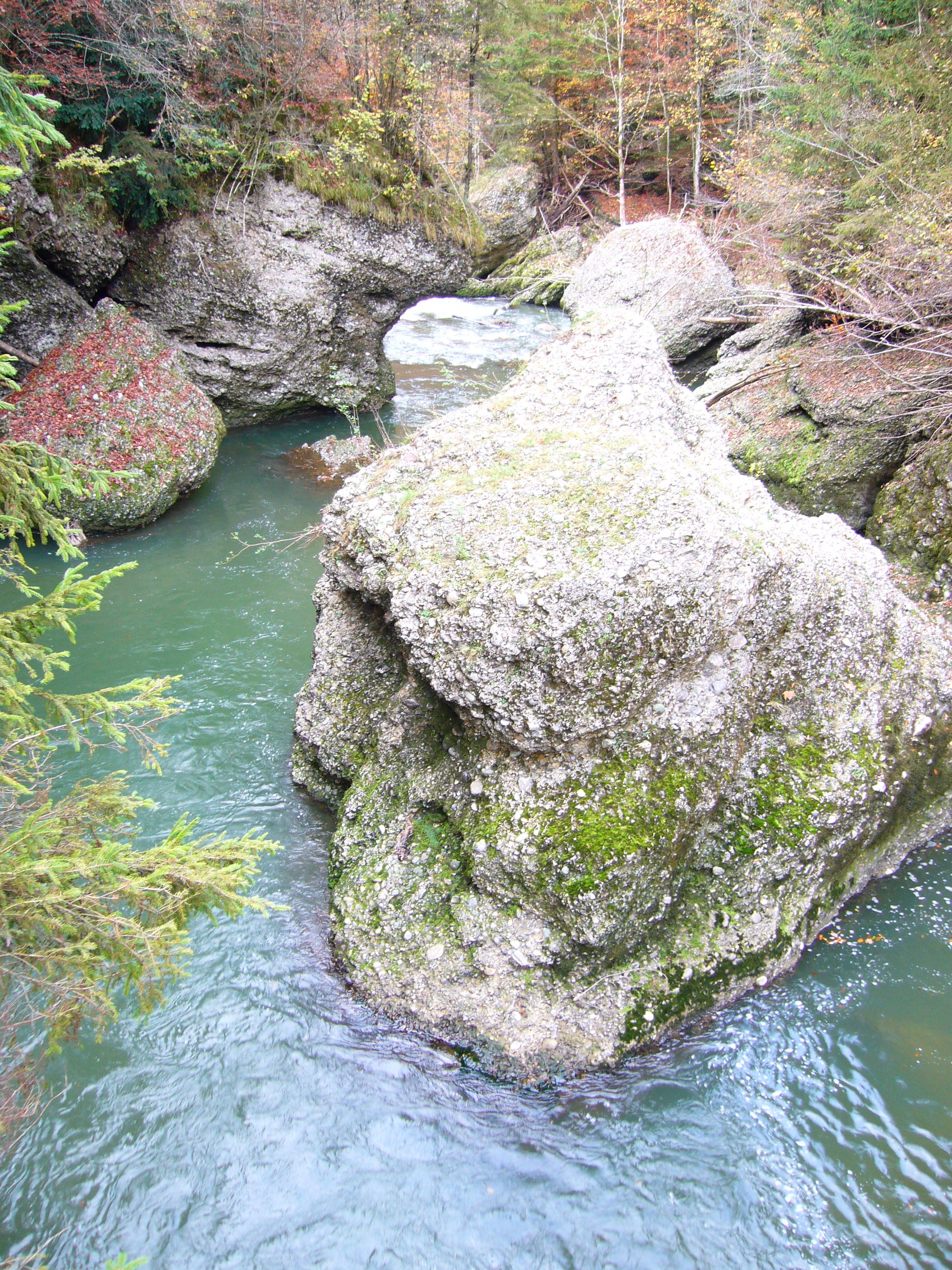
Sihl at Sihlsprung

== Geography ==
=== In common ===
The area alongside Lake Zürich had been formed as the left moraine of the Ice Age glacier, the bed of which is now the Lake Zürich and the valley of the Sihl. Sihl Valley is extensively wooded, but also cultivated and heavily populated in its lower parts. The Sihl (German pronunciation: [ˈsiːl]) is the name of a 68 km (42 mi) long river located in the cantons of Schwyz (SZ) and Zürich (ZH). The valley compromises parts of the districts of Einsiedeln (SZ) (upper Sihl valley), Horgen (ZH) and Zürich. The region of the valley comprises about 250 km^{2} (97 sq mi).

=== Upper Sihl Valley ===
Sihl rises at Drusberg near Hoch-Ybrig in the canton of Schwyz, passes the 8.5 km (5.3 mi) long Sihlsee near Einsiedeln, Sunnegg near Biberbrugg and Schindellegi.

=== Lower Sihl Valley ===
Now it enters the canton of Zurich, nearby Samstagern passing Hütten and the rapid called Sihlsprung situated in Schönenberg, flowing through the valley between the Zimmerberg and Albis chains. Near Sihlbrugg, the rivers passes the Sihlwald, the largest remaining deciduous forest of the Swiss Plateau, located between Sihlbrugg and Zürich-Leimbach. The Sihl flows in Zürich underneath Zürich Hauptbahnhof – parts of the train station are built below the Sihl – before joining the Limmat at Platzspitz park located at the Swiss National Museum.

The break of the concrete dam of the Sihlsee could lead, according to studies, to an 8 m (26 ft) high flood wave reaching the city of Zürich, the biggest city in Switzerland, within 1.5 hours (Leimbach), its inner city (2 hours) and Zürich-Altstetten within 3 hours.

== Flora and fauna ==
=== Flora ===
As part of a floristic mapping, the territory of the Sihl Valley between the city of Zürich and Höhronen was mapped by the Institute for the conservation of the Canton of Zürich on an area of 249 km2. The so-called report "Flora des Sihltals von der Stadt Zürich bis zum Höhronen" includes 2109 species, including 611 frequent crops and ornamental plants or accidentally introduced species which grow wild at most locally and in the short term. 1498 species are, or were at least 30 years during the last 160 years in stable populations exist. Of which 177 or 13% are now extinct, and 284 have been re-introduced and introduced. In all, the flora has become more species-ric, however, 42% of the previous species have decreased and only 30% show an increasing trend.

== Recreation ==
Sihltal is a well-known recreation area and popular for hiking and biking tours along Sihl and in the surrounding hills between the chains of Höhronen, Albis-Felsenegg and Zimmerberg.

== Zimmerberg-Sihltal region ==
The term "Region Zimmerberg-Sihltal" usually refers to the mountain, the area and plateau between Kilchberg–Richterswil–Samstagern on Lake Zürich and the Shil valley. This region includes the municipalities respectively villages of Adliswil, Hirzel, Horgen, Hütten, Kilchberg, Langnau am Albis, Oberrieden, Richterswil, Rüschlikon, Samstagern, Schönenberg, Sihlbrugg, Thalwil and Wädenswil.

== Transportation ==
The lower Sihl valley has an excellent local transportation network: Zimmerberg bus line (Zimmerbergbus) and Sihltal Zürich Uetliberg Bahn (SZU) are providing the local public transportation in the Sihl valley, in addition to the Luftseilbahn Adliswil-Felsenegg (LAF for short or commonly Felseneggbahn), an aerial tramway connecting Adliswil and Felsenegg. Sihlbrugg train station is a nodal point of the SBB-CFF-FFS-Gotthardbahn and Sihltal Zürich Uetliberg Bahn (SZU) railways. Sihlbrugg Dorf (Sihlwald) is the terminal station of the Zürich S-Bahn on the line S4 (SZU) and a stop on the line S21 to Zürich Hauptbahnhof (VBZ). Nearby the city of Zürich, additional bus lines are provided by the Verkehrsbetriebe Zürich. It is also important as terminal of the A4 motorway between Zug and the canton of Zürich, and of five regional streets in the Sihltal to Zürich, Zug, Langnau am Albis and to Wädenswil (Hirzel Pass).
