= Adliswil =

- Municipality

- Flag Coat of arms
- Location of Adliswil
- Location within Switzerland Location within Canton of Zurich
- Coordinates: 47°19′N 8°32′E
- Country: Switzerland
- Canton: Zurich
- District: Horgen

Government
  - Executive: Stadtrat with 7 members
  - Mayor: Stadtpräsident; Farid Zeroual CVP/PDC (as of 2018)
  - Parliament: Grosser Gemeinderat with 36 members

Area
  - Total: 7.79 km^{2} (3.01 sq mi)
- Elevation (Bahnhofplatz/ Bahnhofbrücke): 451 m (1,480 ft)

Population (December 2020)
  - Total: 19,049
  - Density: 2,450/km^{2} (6,330/sq mi)
- Demonym: German: Adliswiler(in)
- Time zone: UTC+01:00 (CET)
  - Summer (DST): UTC+02:00 (CEST)
- Postal code: 8134
- SFOS number: 131
- ISO 3166 code: CH-ZH
- Surrounded by: Kilchberg, Langnau am Albis, Rüschlikon, Stallikon, Zurich
- Website: www.adliswil.ch

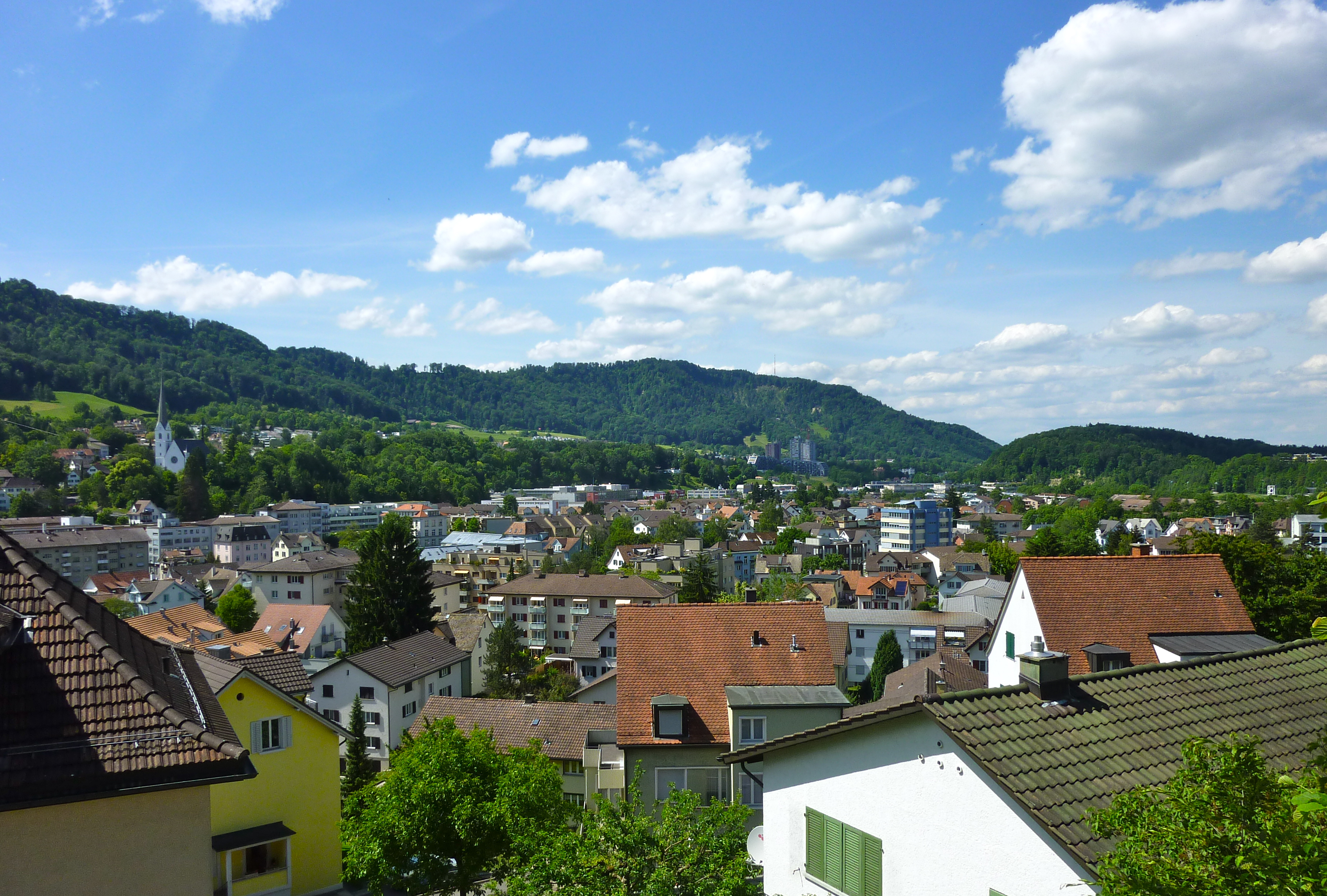
Adliswil with the Üetliberg ridge behind

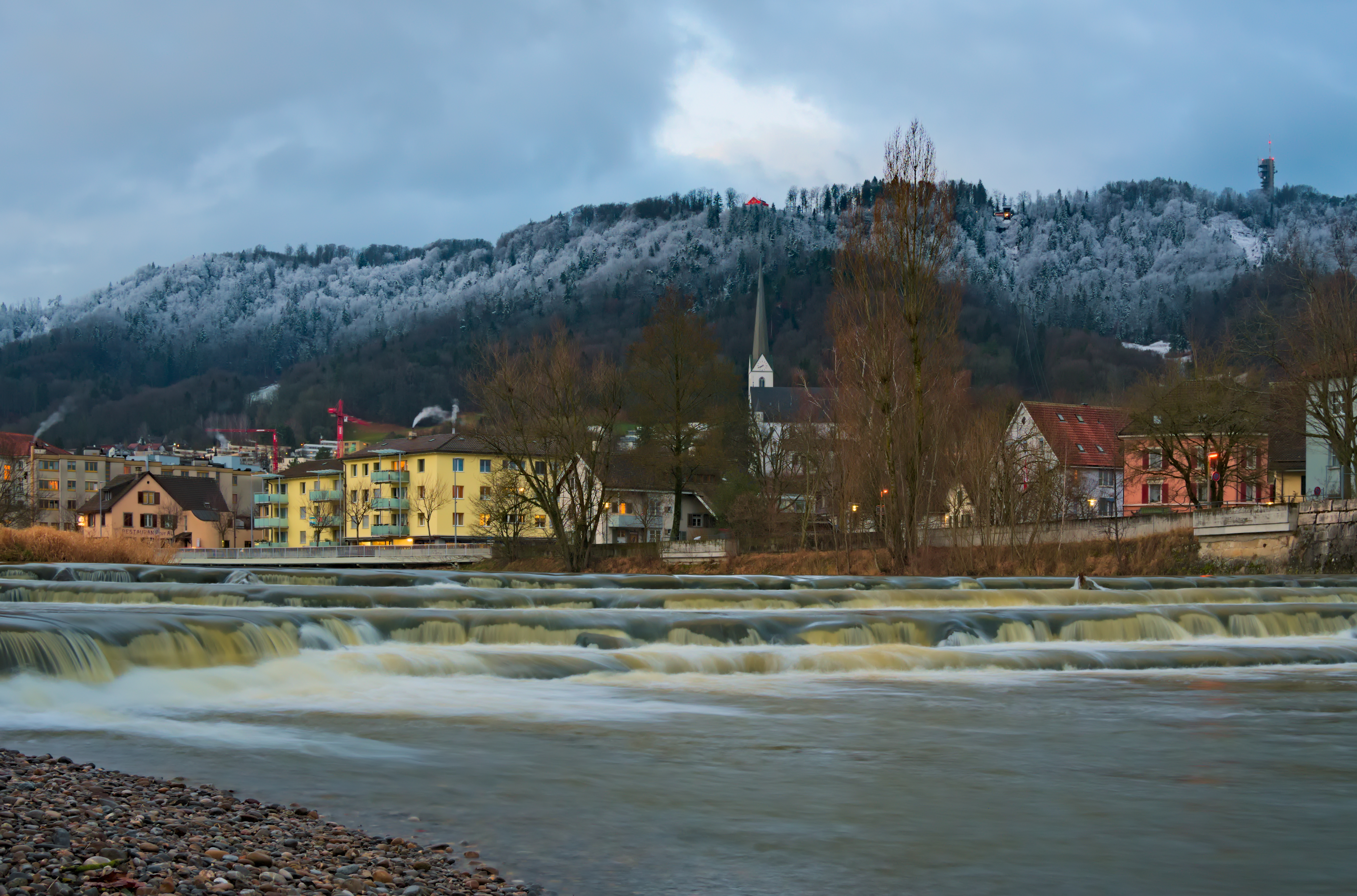
Adliswil, Sihl and Felsenegg

Adliswil is a town and a municipality in the district of Horgen in the canton of Zürich in Switzerland.

== History ==
Aerial view from 600 m by Walter Mittelholzer (1931)

Adliswil is first mentioned in 1050 as Adelenswile. In the second half of the 12th century, it was mentioned as Adololdiswile and in 1248 as Adeloswile.

Under the Helvetic Republic, the hamlet of Buchenegg was transferred to the municipality of Stallikon. In 1893 the town sections of Oberleimbach and Sood were added to Adliswil.

== Geography ==
Adliswil has an area of 7.8 km^{2} (3.0 sq mi). Of this area, 23.4% is used for agricultural purposes, while 32.1% is forested. The rest of the land, 42.9% is settled (buildings or roads) and the remainder (1.7%) is non-productive (rivers, glaciers or mountains). In 1996 housing and buildings made up 32.6% of the total area, while transportation infrastructure made up the rest (10.4%). Of the total unproductive area, water (streams and lakes) made up 1.7% of the area. As of 2007 38.3% of the total municipal area was undergoing some type of construction.

It is located in the region of Zimmerberg, within the valley of the river Sihl to the south of the city of Zürich, next to the localities of Kilchberg, Rüschlikon, Langnau am Albis and on the other hand Stallikon pertaining this to the district of Affoltern.

== Demographics ==
Adliswil has a population (as of December 2020) of 19,049. As of 2021 a total of 38.5% were foreign nationals; the gender distribution of the population was 50.0% male and 50.0% female. Over the last 10 years the population has grown at a rate of 4%. Most of the population (as of 2000) speaks German (80.9%), with Italian being second most common ( 4.9%) and English being third ( 2.5%).

In the 2007 election the most popular party was the SVP which received 36.2% of the vote. The next three most popular parties were the SPS (21.4%), the FDP (13.4%) and the CVP (9.9%).

The age distribution of the population (as of 2000) is children and teenagers (0–19 years old) make up 20.2% of the population, while adults (20–64 years old) make up 64.5% and seniors (over 64 years old) make up 15.4%. In Adliswil about 75.5% of the population (between age 25–64) have completed either non-mandatory upper secondary education or additional higher education (either university or a Fachhochschule). There are 7,573 households in Adliswil.

Adliswil has an unemployment rate of 2.72%. As of 2005, there were 57 people employed in the primary economic sector and about 9 businesses involved in this sector. 832 people are employed in the secondary sector and there are 118 businesses in this sector. 4,049 people are employed in the tertiary sector, with 543 businesses in this sector. As of 2007 55.6% of the working population were employed full-time, and 44.4% were employed part-time.

The historical population is given in the following table:

| year | population |
|---|---|
| 1401 | 18 households^{a} |
| 1634 | 315 ^{b} |
| 1836 | 941 |
| 1900 | 4,714 |
| 1941 | 5,105 |
| 1950 | 6,240 |
| 2000 | 15,822 |

^a 18 households in the villages of Adliswil, Oberleimbach and Rufers.
^b of the 315 inhabitants, 156 lived in individual, scattered homes, not in the village.

== Religion ==
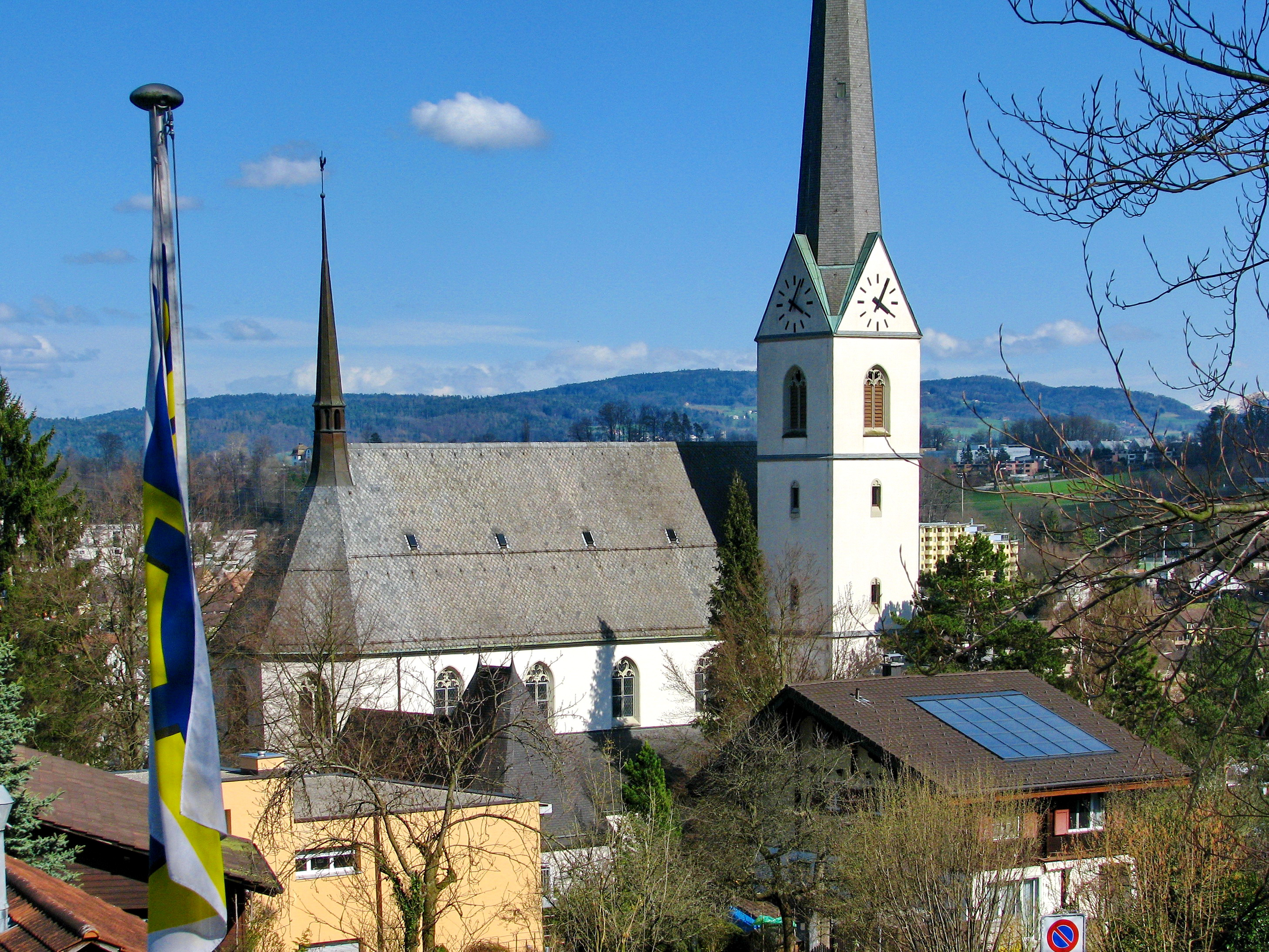
Church in Adliswil, from the Luftseilbahn Adliswil-Felsenegg

As of 2008 there were 5,275 Catholics and 4,999 Protestants in Adliswil. In the 2000 census, religion was broken down into several smaller categories. From the 2000 census, 38.6% were some type of Protestant, with 36.2% belonging to the Swiss Reformed Church and 2.4% belonging to other Protestant churches. 35.5% of the population were Catholic. Of the rest of the population, 5% were Muslim, 7.8% belonged to another religion (not listed), 3.8% did not give a religion, and 13.2% were atheist or agnostic. The Sri Sivasubramaniar Temple is situated in the Sihl Valley .

== Education ==
=== Public schools ===
The public schools (primary and lower secondary school) are supervised by the commune's school board. The board consists of nine elected members.

Public schools in Adliswil
| Name | Type | Campus (Schulhaus) | No. classes | No. of teachers | No. of pupils |
|---|---|---|---|---|---|
| Hofern | Sekundar A Sekundar B/C | Hofern | 4; 5 | 9 Klassenl., 13 Fachl., 2 Logopäden | ca. 170 |
| Zentrum Kronenwiese | Sekundar A Sekundar B/C; Aufnahmeklasse | Kronenwiese | 15; 1 | 10 Klassenl., 10 Fachl., 1 Schulsozialarbeiter, 1 Schul. Heilpädagoge | ca. 170 |
| Sonnenberg / Wilacker | Primar 1–6; Primar 1–3; Kindergarten; Kindergarten; Kindergarten | Sonnenberg; Wilacker; Sihlau; Sonnenrain; Wanneten | 9; 4; 2 2 | 40 | 200; 90; 50 50 |
| Kopfholz | Unterstufe; Mittelstufe | Kopfholz | 10 Mjgkl. 10 Mjgkl. | ? | ? |
| Werd / Dietlimoos | Kindergarten; Kindergarten; Kindergarten; Primar 1–2; Primar 1-6 | Hofacker; Isengrund; Dietlimoos; Dietlimoos; Werd | 2; 2; 2; 2; 11 | 2; 3; 2; 2; 16 | ? |
| Zopf | Primar; Kindergarten | Zopf | (zweijährige Mehrjahresklassen) | 30 Lehrer, 1 Schulsozialarbeiter | 160; 80 |
| Musikschule Adliswil-Langnau | music school | | | 50 music teachers | |

=== Other private schools ===
The Zurich International School (ZIS), an international school with an international curriculum, has its upper school (senior high school) campus in Adliswil. As a private school which has instruction primarily in a foreign language (English), ZIS is approved up to compulsory school age by the canton. The whole ZIS program, for students aged 3 to 18, is accredited by the Commission on International Education and the International Baccalaureate Organisation accredits the IB Diploma at ZIS.

== Transportation ==
Adliswil is the only town in the canton of Zürich to pride itself on having a cable car (Felseneggbahn), which connects the town to Felsenegg on the edge of the town. Adliswil railway station is a stop on the S-Bahn Zürich's S4 line, which is a 15-minute ride from Zürich Hauptbahnhof. There is an intermediate station at Sood-Oberleimbach which is also located in the municipality of Adliswil. The Zimmerberg bus line (Zimmerbergbus), provided by the Sihltal Zürich Uetliberg Bahn (SZU), connects the Zimmerberg region and parts of the Sihl valley. The ZVV bus lines 184 and 185 provide a connection to Zurich (Wollishofen), and the ZVV night bus services provide a connection to Zürich city centre.

== Notable people ==
- Rudolf Günthardt (born 1936 in Adliswil), a Swiss equestrian, silver medallist at the 1960 Summer Olympics
- Rolf Fringer (born 1957 in Adliswil), an Austrian football manager, also managed the Switzerland national football team
- Mario Fehr (born 1958, lives in Adliswil), Swiss politician
- Bettina Bunge (born 1963 in Adliswil), a retired German tennis player
- Daniel Quaiser (born 1975 in Adliswil), a Swiss designer, musician and baritone singer
- Izer Aliu (born 1999 in Adliswil), a Swiss footballer
- Bram Moolenaar (lived in Adliswil), computer programmer and member of the open-source software community
