= Sihl =

River in Switzerland

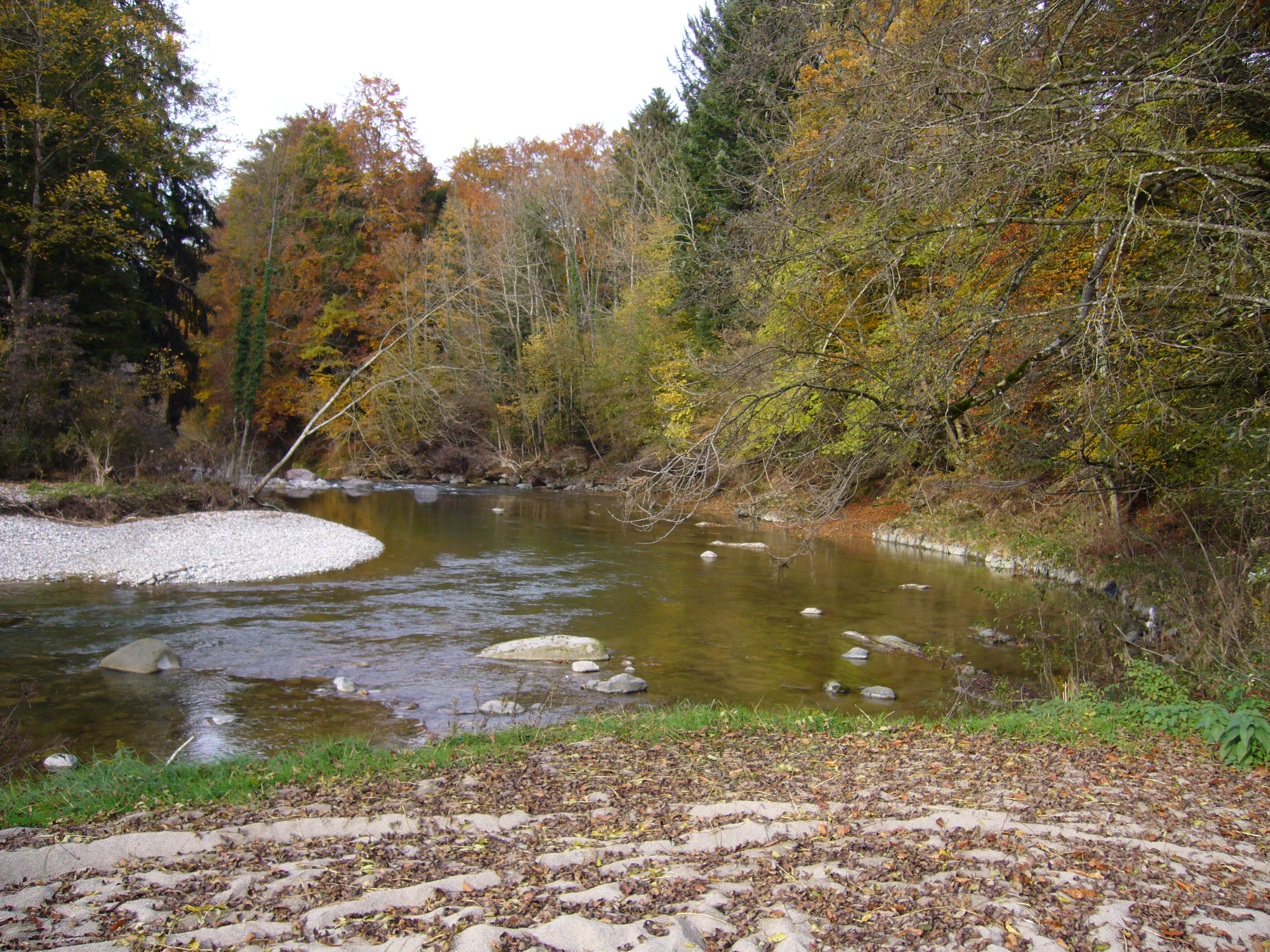
- The Sihl near Sihlbrugg

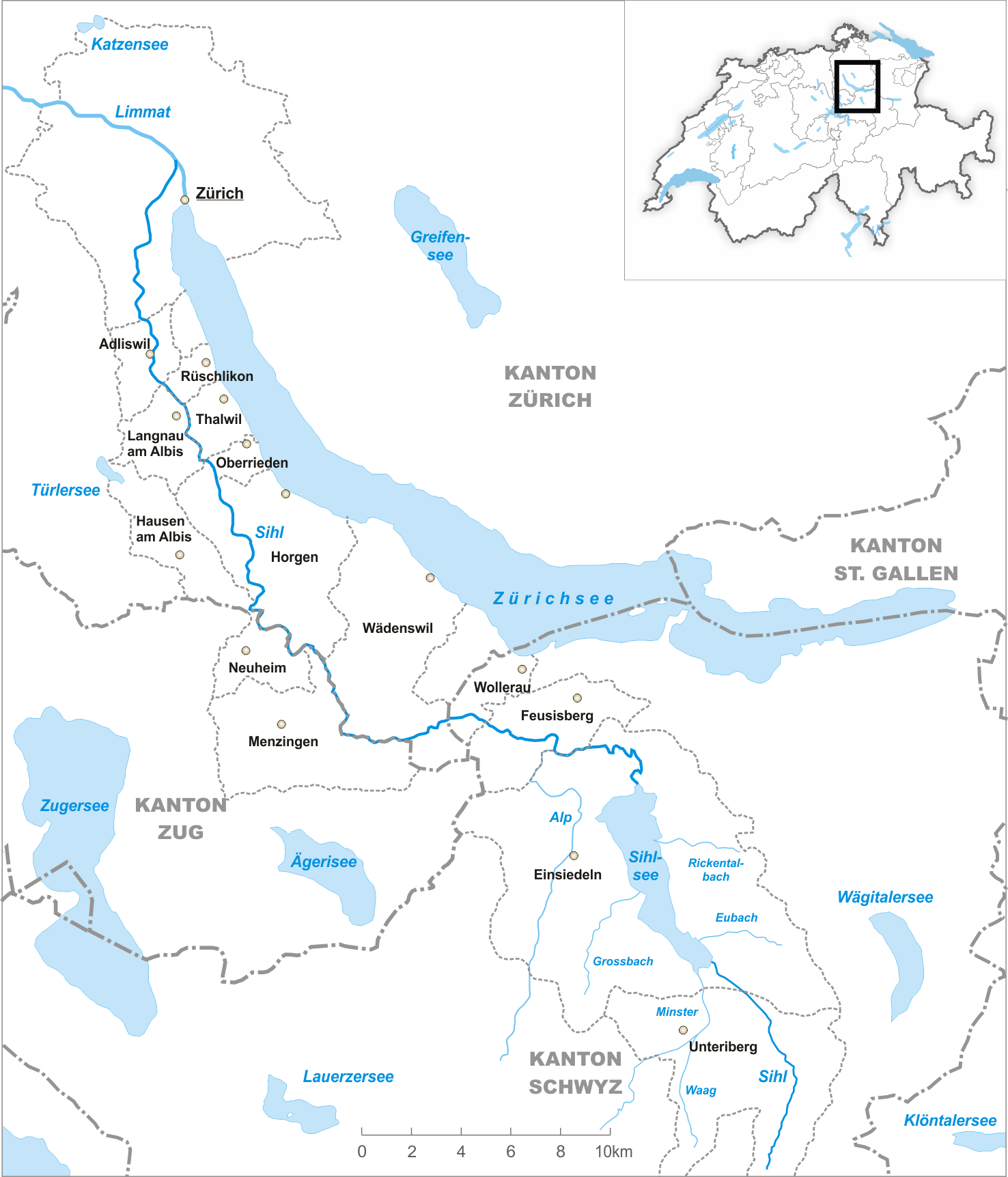

Location
- Country: Switzerland

Physical characteristics
- Source
  - location: Canton of Schwyz, Switzerland
- Mouth
  - location: Limmat, City of Zürich
  - coordinates: 47.3826°N 8.5382°E
- Length: 73 km (45 mi)

Basin features
- Progression: Limmat→ Aare→ Rhine→ North Sea

The Sihl (German pronunciation: [ˈziːl]) is a Swiss river that rises near the Druesberg mountain in the canton of Schwyz, and eventually flows into the Limmat in the centre of the city of Zürich, after crossing the Zürich–Winterthur railway at Zürich HB. It has a length of 73 km (45 mi), including the Sihlsee reservoir, through which the river flows. Water is abstracted from the river at the Sihlsee, leading to decreased downstream water flows and a consequent reduction in water quality.

The river flows through, or along the border of, the cantons of Schwyz, Zürich and Zug. The main settlements of the Sihl Valley are all in the canton of Zürich, and include the towns of Langnau am Albis and Adliswil, along with a south-western segment of the city of Zürich. Above Langnau am Albis, some 13 km (8.1 mi) from the confluence with the Limmat, there are no major settlements alongside the river, and only a few small villages. Whilst the town of Einsiedeln is situated close to the Sihlsee, it is actually in the valley of a tributary river, the Alp.

== Etymology ==
The first written reference to the name dates to 1018, in the form Sylaha. The name may be of Old European or Celtic origin: *Sîla ("quiet watercourse", from a root *sîl = "to trickle, wet") > Romance Sila with the addition of the Old High German element aha "flowing water".

== Course of the river ==
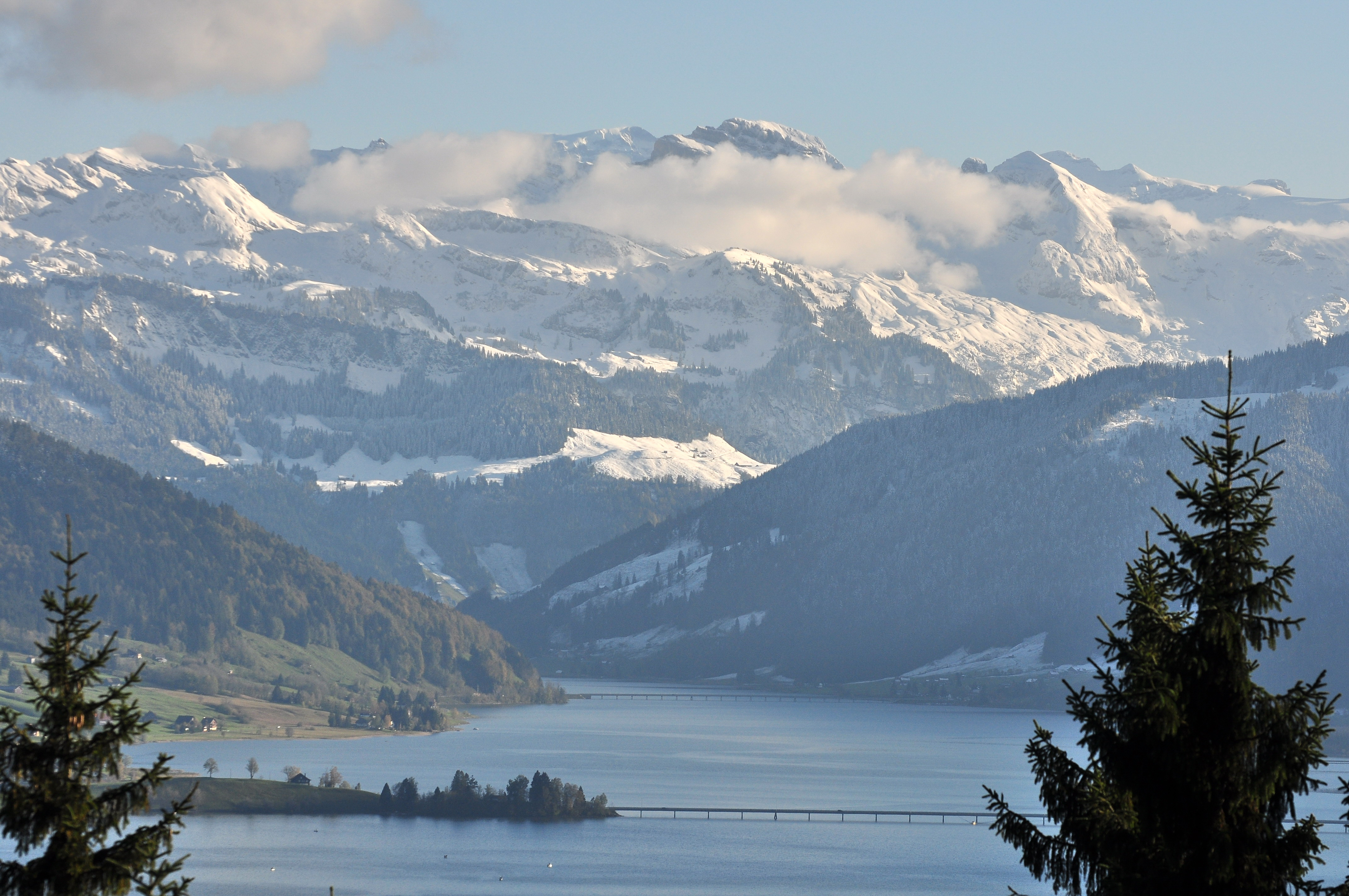
The Sihlsee, the upper valley of the Sihl, and the Druesberg mountain

The river rises to the north-eastern side of the Druesberg mountain, in the municipality of Unteriberg of the canton of Schwyz, and flows north to the village of Studen. Some 2 km (1.2 mi) downstream of Studen, the river enters the artificial Sihlsee reservoir at its southern end. Nearby, the Minster also flows into the Sihlsee, and was, prior to construction of the reservoir, a direct tributary of the Sihl. The Eubach, Rickentalbach and Grossbach tributary streams also flow into the Sihl via the Sihlsee.

The Sihlsee is some 8.5 km (5.3 mi) long, and lies close to the town of Einsiedeln. It is Switzerland's largest artificial lake, and is impounded by a 33-metre (108 ft) high dam. Electricity is generated by diverting water down a tunnel from the Sihlsee, which has a water level elevation of 889 m (2,917 ft), through the Etzelwerk hydroelectric power station at Altendorf, into Lake Zürich, which has a water level elevation of 406 m (1,332 ft). This has led to decreased water flows downstream of the dam, with negative impact on water quality and a tendency for the river to dry out in places during low flow conditions in winter.

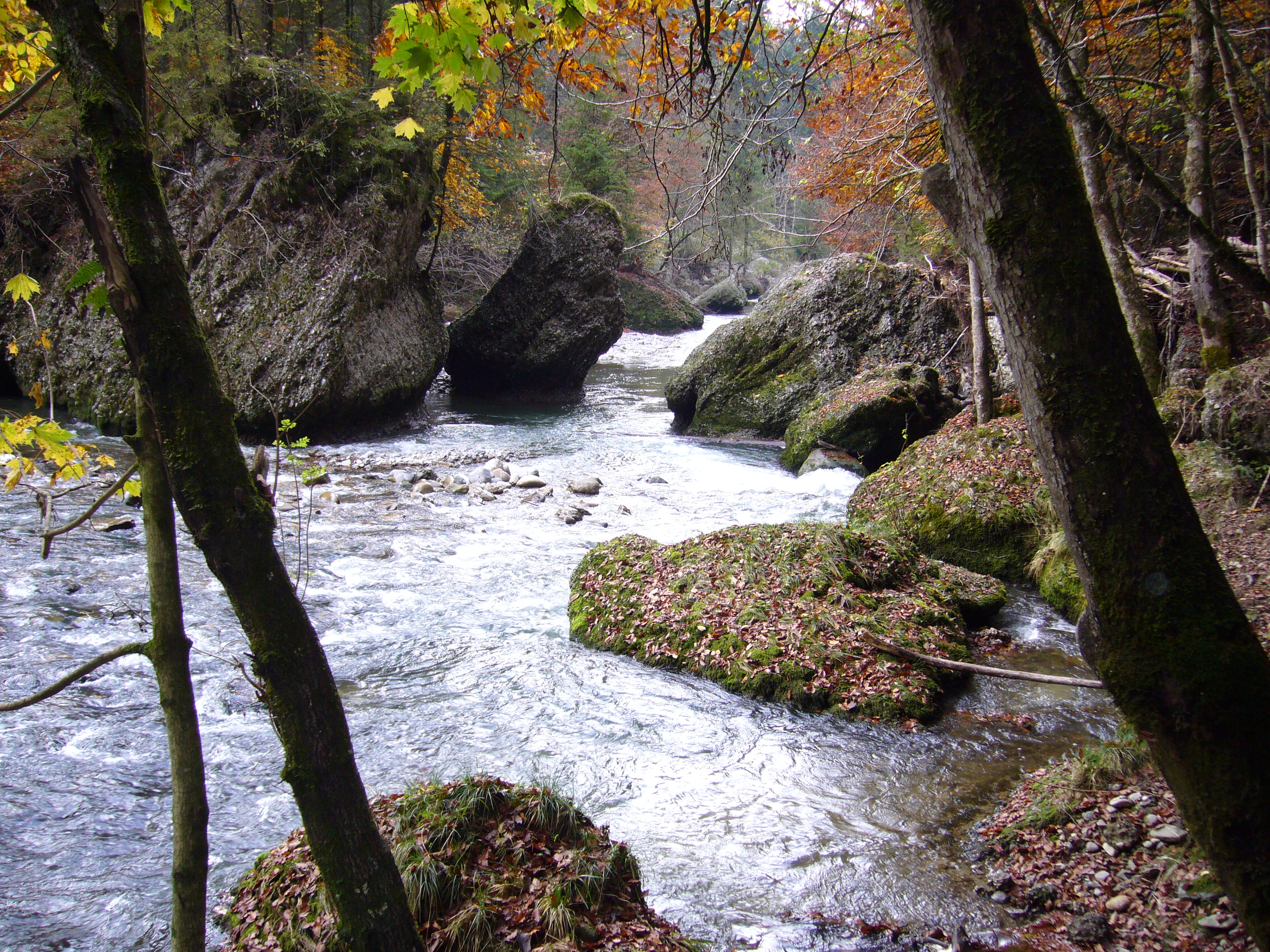
The Sihlsprung rapids

Below the dam, the Sihl enters a narrow glacial valley and continues in an easterly direction, receiving the water of its tributary the Alp, before briefly entering the canton of Zürich near the village of Hütten. The river then continues as the border between the cantons of Zug and Zürich, passing through the Sihlsprung rapids along the way. At the village of Sihlbrugg, the river enters the canton of Zürich for a second and final time. North of Sihlbrugg, the river flows through a lightly populated and heavily wooded valley, accompanied by a main road and railway line. The Sihlwald forest, a rare example of a large-scale and original forest, lies on the slopes of the Albis that rise up from the river to the west. At this point, Lake Zürich lies only 2 km (1.2 mi) to the east, but is separated from the river by the Zimmerberg mountain.

Reaching the town of Langnau am Albis, on the west bank of the river, and the village of Gattikon, on the east bank, the valley becomes more populous and industrial, with industry originally attracted by the available water power. From here the valley bottom is continuously built-up through the town of Adliswil to the boundary of the city of Zürich. Once in the city, the river flows through and between the Leimbach, Wollishofen, Friesenberg, Alt-Wiedikon and Enge quarters before reaching the city centre. In this stretch the river is crossed by many bridges, and for one 1.2 km (0.75 mi) stretch the A3 motorway runs along and over the river on a viaduct.

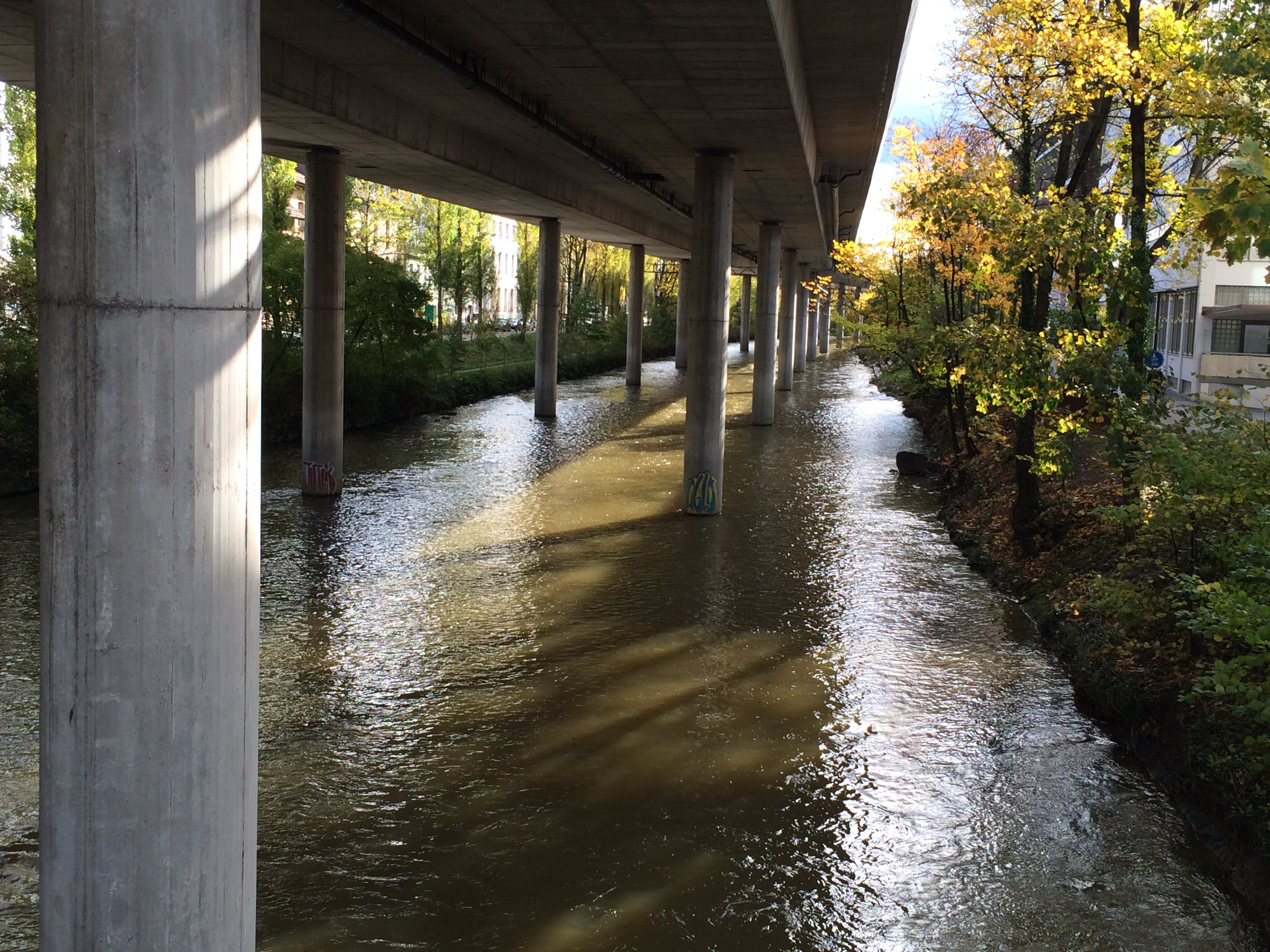
The Sihl as a route for a motorway

Nearer the city centre, the SZU railway line runs in tunnel along and under the river. One access to that line's Selnau station is constructed in the form of an artificial island within the river. Just downstream of here, the Schanzengraben moat, which is fed from Lake Zürich and formerly protected the western perimeter of the Altstadt, flows into the Sihl, just before the latter flows under Zürich Hauptbahnhof railway station. The station has platforms on two levels, and the river actually tunnels under the upper ones, but above the lower ones, in 5 culverts each with a length of 190 metres (623 ft) and a clear opening of 12 metres (39 ft) by 3 metres (10 ft). Shortly after passing under the station, the Sihl joins the Limmat at the apex of the Platzspitz park.

== Flood risk ==
The river flows through the Sihlsee some 50 kilometres (31 mi) upstream of Zürich city centre, and studies have shown that a failure of the dam could lead to an 8-metre (26 ft) high flood wave reaching the city within 2 hours. This threat is exacerbated by the fact that the river passes through Zürich Hauptbahnhof station in a tunnel that limits the river’s flow capacity, raising concerns about the capacity of the tunnel to deal with extreme flood events. This threat has led the City of Zürich to develop, publish and test evacuation plans for the affected areas of the city.

In 2022, work began on a discharge tunnel (Entlastungsstollen), capable of discharging 300m^{3} of water per second into Lake Zurich (about 100 times the regular flow of Sihl) in case of emergency. It is expected for the tunnel to enter service in 2026.

== See also ==
- List of rivers of Switzerland
