= Horgen District =

Coordinates: 47°14′N 8°36′E

Horgen District Bezirk Horgen
- District
- Flag Coat of arms
- Country: Switzerland
- Canton: Zürich
- Capital: Horgen

Area
  - Total: 104.16 km^{2} (40.22 sq mi)

Population (31 December 2020)
  - Total: 127,263
  - Density: 1,221.8/km^{2} (3,164.5/sq mi)
- Time zone: UTC+1 (CET)
  - Summer (DST): UTC+2 (CEST)
- Municipalities: 9

Horgen District is a district of Canton of Zürich in Switzerland. The district is located in the Zimmerberg and Sihl Valley region on the left shore of Lake Zürich; its district capital is Horgen. The district consists of 11 municipalities and has a population of 127,263 (as of 31 December 2020) and an area of 104.16 km^{2} (40.22 sq mi).

== Municipalities ==
Municipality	Population (31 December 2020)	Area, km^{2}
Adliswil	19,049	7.79
Horgen-Sihlbrugg Dorf^{a}	23,090	21.07
Kilchberg	9,207	2.58
Langnau am Albis	7,902	8.66
Oberrieden	5,122	2.76
Richterswil-Samstagern^{a}	13,670	7.54
Rüschlikon	6,113	2.94
Thalwil	18,278	5.53
Wädenswil	21,792	17.37
Total	127,263	104.16

^a Sihlbrugg Dorf and Samstagern are both significant villages that are not independent municipalities.

== Mergers ==
- On 1 January 2018 the former municipality of Hirzel merged into the municipality of Horgen.
- On 1 January 2019 the former municipalities of Hütten and Schönenberg merged into the municipality of Wädenswil.

== See also ==
- Municipalities of the canton of Zürich
