= Hüttnersee =

Lake in Zurich, Switzerland

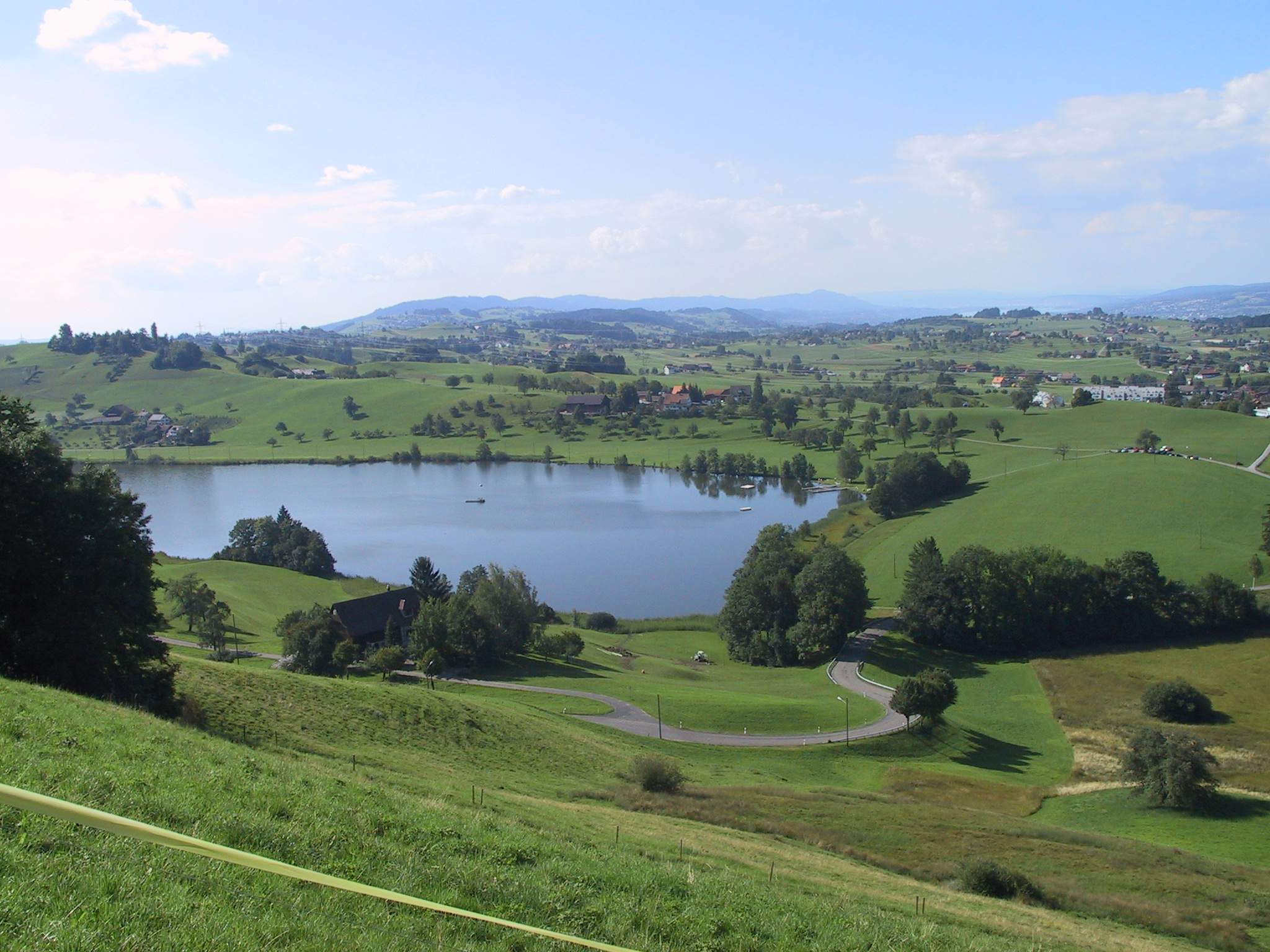
- seen from the South-West

- Location within Canton of Zurich Location within Canton of Schwyz Location within Switzerland Location within Alps
- Interactive map of Hüttnersee
- Location: Hütten, Canton of Zurich
- Coordinates: 47°11′0″N 8°40′30″E
- Catchment area: 2.4 km^{2} (0.93 sq mi)
- Basin countries: Switzerland
- Surface area: 0.165 km^{2} (0.064 sq mi)
- Average depth: 6.3 m (21 ft)
- Max. depth: 13.3 m (44 ft)
- Water volume: 1.045 million cubic metres (847 acre⋅ft)
- Residence time: 120 days
- Surface elevation: 658 m (2,159 ft)

Hüttnersee ("Hüttenerweiher" or "Hüttnerseeli") is a small lake at Hütten in the Canton of Zurich, Switzerland. The southern shore is located in Samstagern, a village in the municipality of Richterswil. Its surface area is 0.165 km^{2} (0.064 sq mi).
