= Sihltal Zürich Uetliberg Bahn =

Railway company in Zürich, Switzerland

Sihltal Zürich Uetliberg Bahn AG

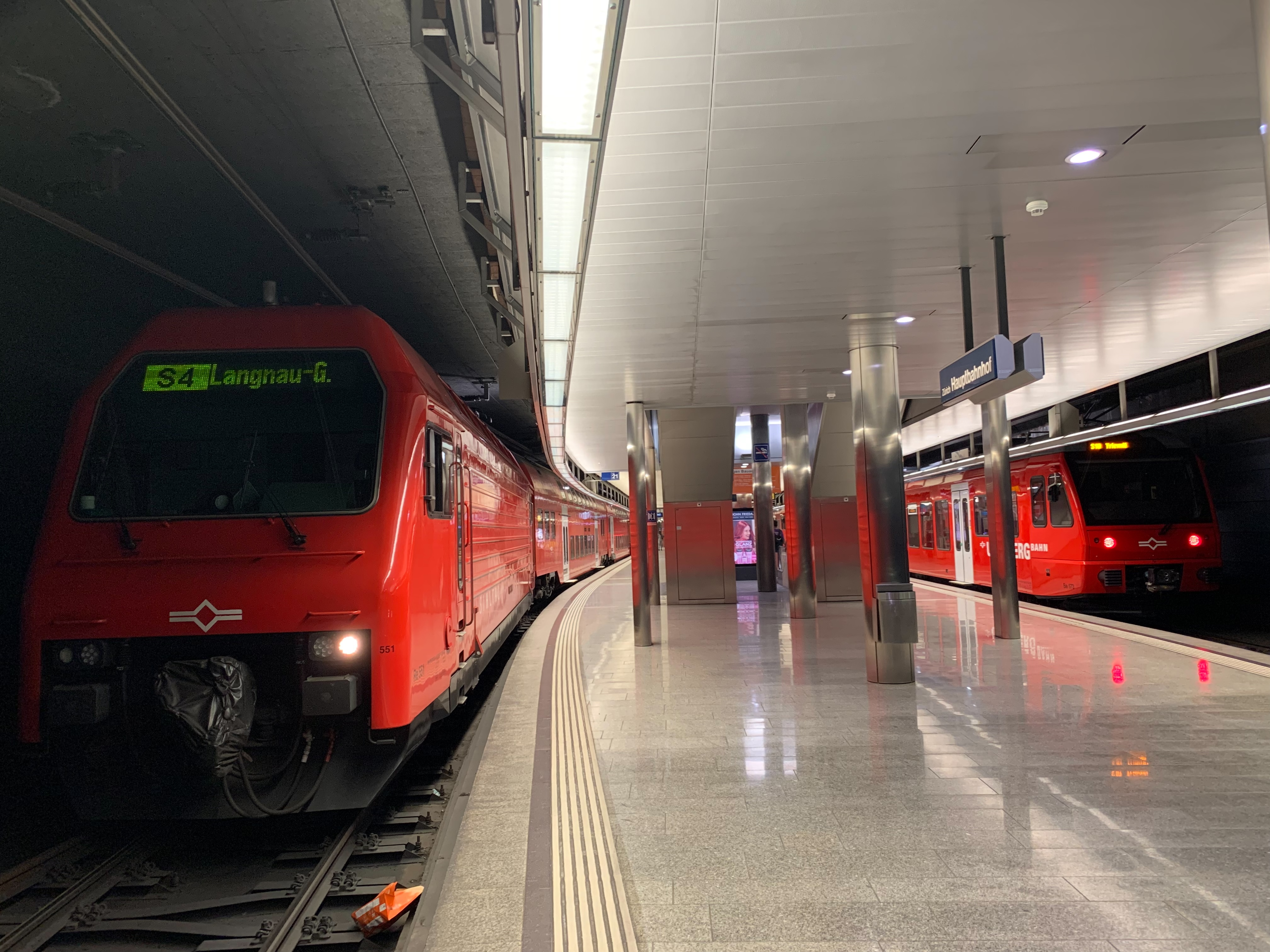
- Re 456 push-pull train (Sihltalbahn) and Be 510 (Uetlibergbahn) at Zürich HB SZU
- Industry: Public Transport
- Founded: 1891; 135 years ago (as SiTB); 1973; 53 years ago (fusion to SZU)
- Headquarters: Zurich, Switzerland
- Net income: ▲ -CHF 79,5 million (2021)
- Number of employees: ▲179,2 (2021, FTE)
- Website: www.szu.ch

The Sihltal Zürich Uetliberg Bahn AG (lit. 'Sihl Valley Zurich Uetliberg Railway') – commonly abbreviated to SZU – is a public transport company and network in the Canton of Zurich. The network comprises the Uetliberg and Sihltal railway lines, operated by S-Bahn services S4 and S10, a cable car and several bus services of Zimmerbergbus.

The SZU is jointly owned by the city of Zurich (32.6%), the municipalities of Adliswil, Langnau am Albis, Horgen, Thalwil and Uitikon (6.8%), the Canton of Zurich (23.8%), the federal government (27.8%), and other parties (9%). It is constituted as an Aktiengesellschaft (AG) or public company.

== History ==
The history of the SZU dates back to two separate companies, which built the two railways that now make up the SZU. The first of these companies was the Uetlibergbahn-Gesellschaft (lit. 'Uetliberg Railway Society'), which opened its line from Zurich Selnau railway station in Zurich to near the summit of Uetliberg mountain, Zurich's Hausberg, in 1875. This was followed in 1892 by the Sihltalbahn company (SiTB, lit. 'Sihl Valley Railway'), which opened a line from Zurich Selnau station to Sihlwald. In 1897, this latter line was extended to Sihlbrugg and a connection with the Thalwil–Arth-Goldau line of the former Swiss Northeastern Railway (NOB).

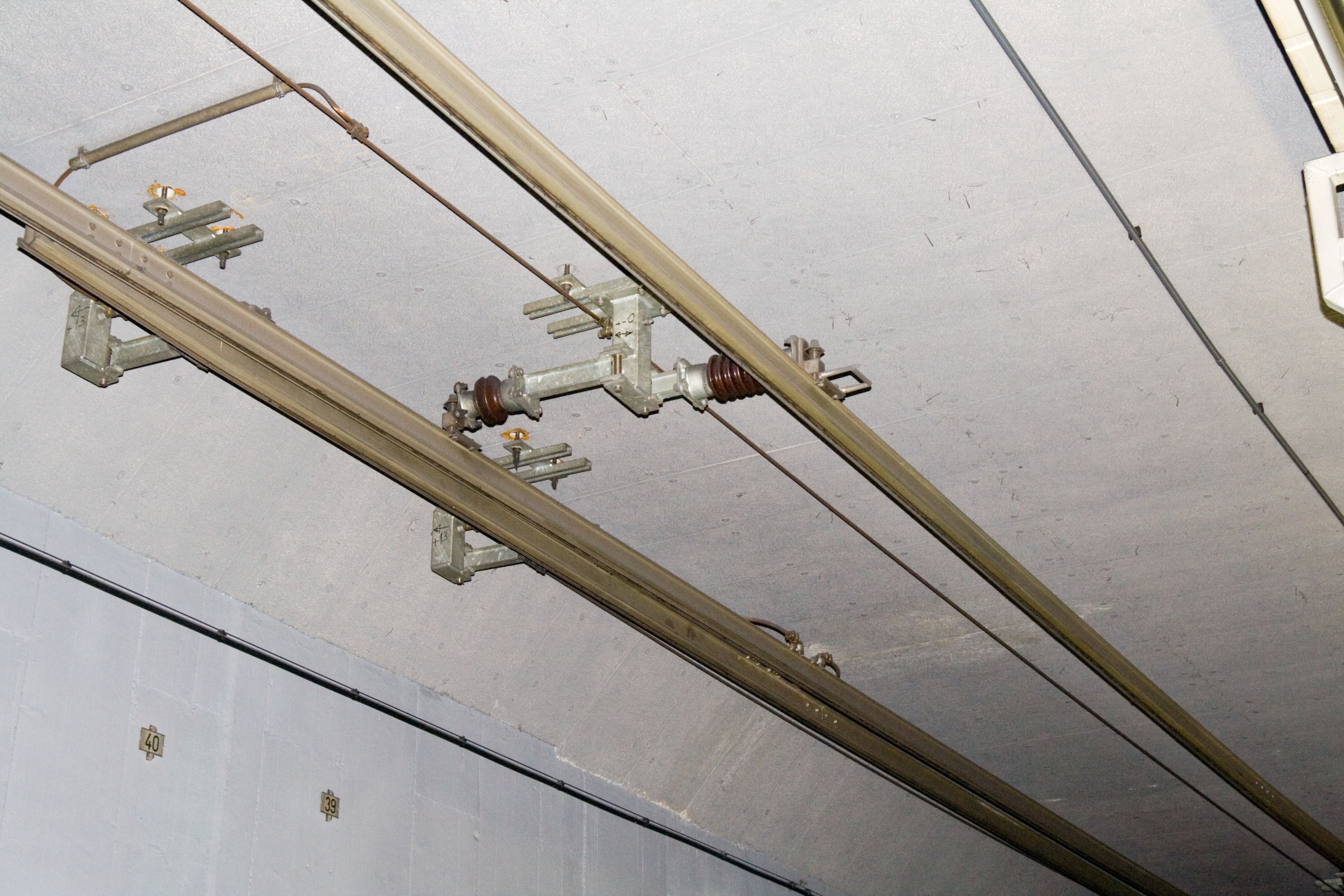
Two overhead conductor rails for the same track. Left, 1200 V DC for the Uetliberg railway (the pantograph is mounted asymmetrically to collect current from this rail); right, 15,000 V AC for the Sihltal railway

In 1920, the Uetlibergbahn-Gesellschaft became bankrupt and was liquidated. Two years later, the Uetlibergbahn was taken over by the Bahngesellschaft Zürich–Uetliberg (BZUe). In 1923, the Uetlibergbahn was electrified using the direct current (DC) system, whilst the following year the Sihltalbahn was electrified using alternating current (AC).

In 1932 the SiTB took over the management of the BZUe, but the two companies remained in existence until 1973, when they were merged to form the SZU. In the meantime, in 1954, the SiTB had taken over the management of the Adliswil-Felsenegg cable car.

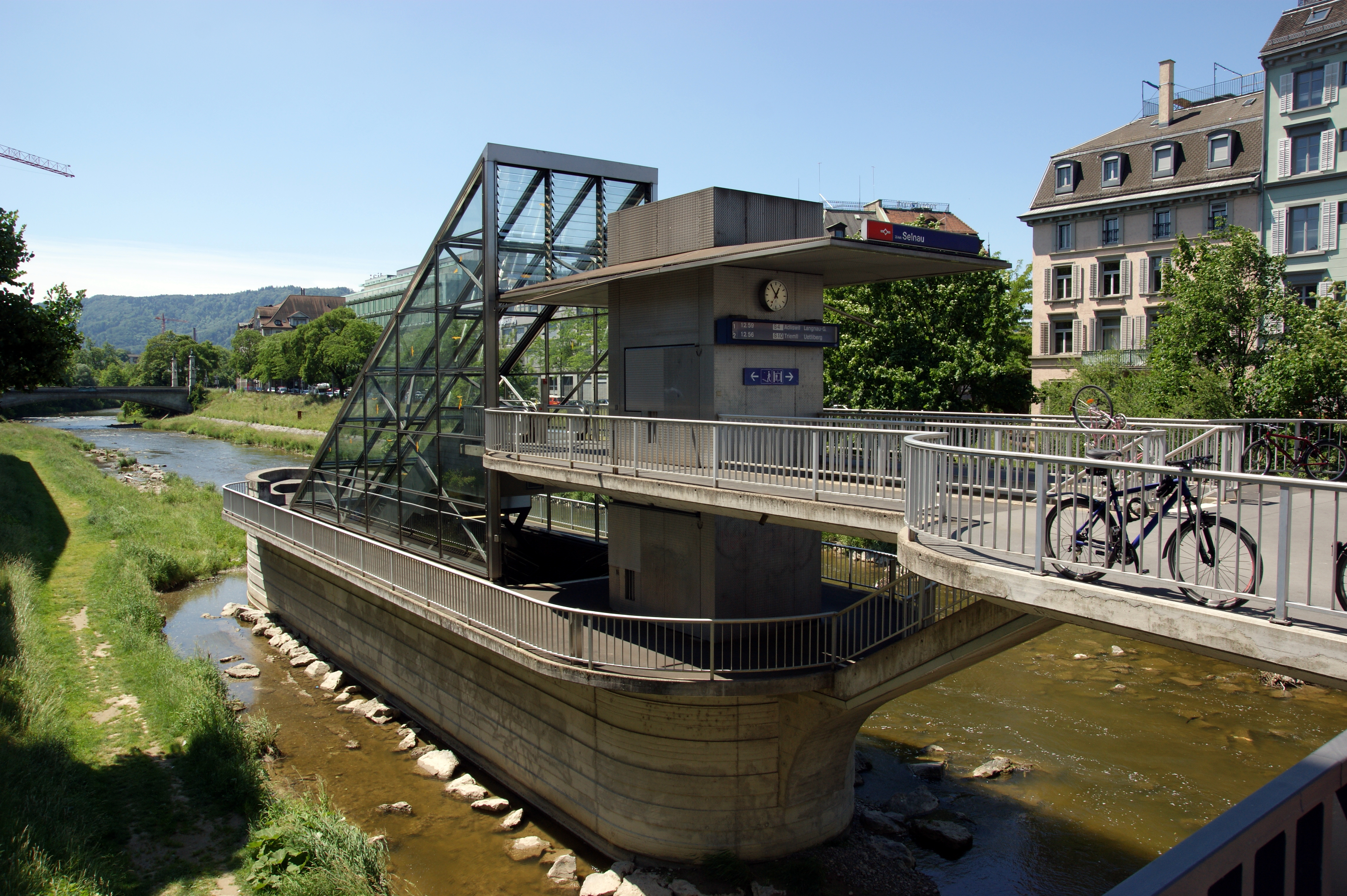
Access to Zurich Selnau station, since 1990 a through station in a tunnel along and under the bed of the Sihl river

In 1990, the two lines were extended from their previous joint terminus at Zurich Selnau (until then a surface station) to a new terminus below Bahnhofplatz, adjacent to Zürich Hauptbahnhof (Zürich HB), named Zürich HB SZU. This extension involved the construction of a new rail tunnel from Selnau to Zürich HB, and a new underground intermediate station adjacent to the former terminus, Zurich Selnau. The underground platforms used at Zürich HB were already in existence, having been built prior to 1973 for a U-Bahn scheme that was ultimately rejected by voters. Once the new extension had been opened, the former terminus at Selnau was redeveloped and little evidence of it is now visible.

In 1995, the company took over responsibility for bus services in parts of the district of Horgen through which the Sihltalbahn runs.

In 2006, after 109 years, the Sihltalbahn stopped servicing Sihlbrugg and Sihlwald, previously the penultimate station, became the new terminus.

== Rail network ==
The SZU continues to operate the original Uetlibergbahn and Sihltalbahn lines. The two lines share a common double-track section between Zürich Giesshübel and Zürich HB SZU, with the final approach being in a tunnel, partly under the Sihl river. A dedicated pair of underground platforms (tracks/Gleis 21 and 22) are used at Zürich Hauptbahnhof, with no rail connection to the rest of the station. The platforms are physically connected via the ShopVille underground mall.

Also operated is a connecting line from Giesshübel to the Swiss Federal Railways at Zürich Wiedikon, although this is normally only used for freight traffic. It is occasionally also used by passenger trains, for example if the regular route From Zürich HB to Zug via Thalwil becomes temporally inoperable. In all, the SZU network measures 30.06 km (18.68 mi): 19.7 km (12.2 mi) as part of the Sihltalbahn (including the Wiedikon–Giesshübel line) and 10.36 km (6.44 mi) of the Uetlibergbahn.

Both railway lines are constructed to 1,435 mm (4 ft 8 1/2 in) standard gauge and both are electrified using the standard Swiss mainline system of overhead lines at 15 kV 16.7 Hz AC. Until 2022, the Uetlibergbahn was electrified using overhead lines at 1200 V DC. In order to avoid conflict on the shared railway section, the Uetlibergbahn used an overhead line offset from the centre of the track, and its cars were equipped with specially designed, laterally displaced pantographs.

== Rolling stock ==
The SZU uses the following rolling stock on its railway lines:

Sihltalbahn (S4)

- 6 Locomotives Re 4/4 542–547
- 7 Control car (rail) Bt 971–973, Bt 984–987
- 6 Intermediate single deck cars BD 281–285, B 293
- 6 Intermediate double deck cars B 271–276
- 2 Re 456 Double deck trains (DPZ): Re 456 551, 552, B 231, 232, 241, 242 and Bt 951, 952 (two sets taken over from SBB, type Re 450)
- 8 Low floor double deck cars (NDW).

Uetlibergbahn (S10)

- 6 SZU Be 510 class EMUs ordered from Stadler in 2010, that entered service in 2014, equipped for dual voltage operation with movable pantograph

== Operations ==
=== Railways ===
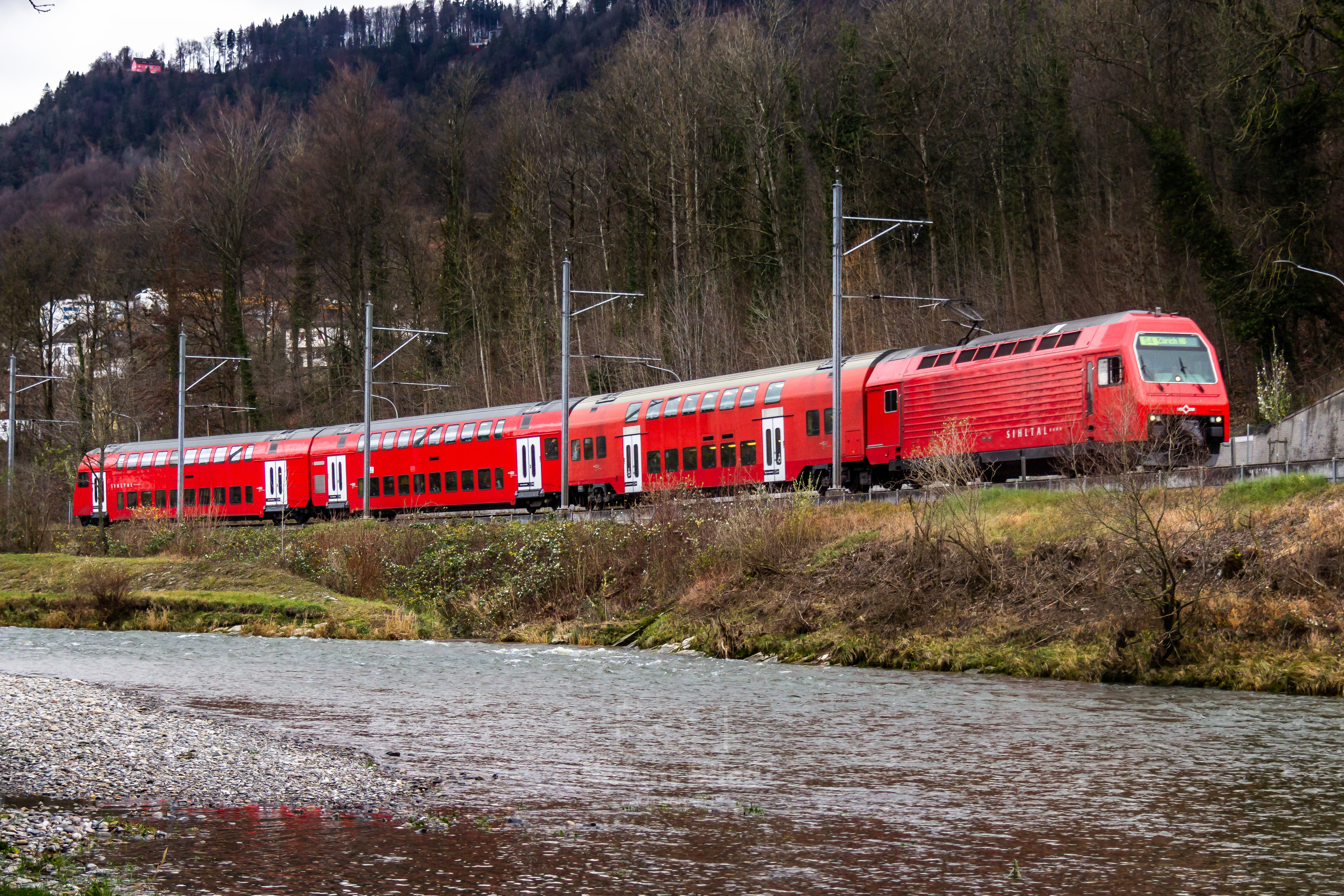
S4 service (Sihltalbahn) in the Sihl valley

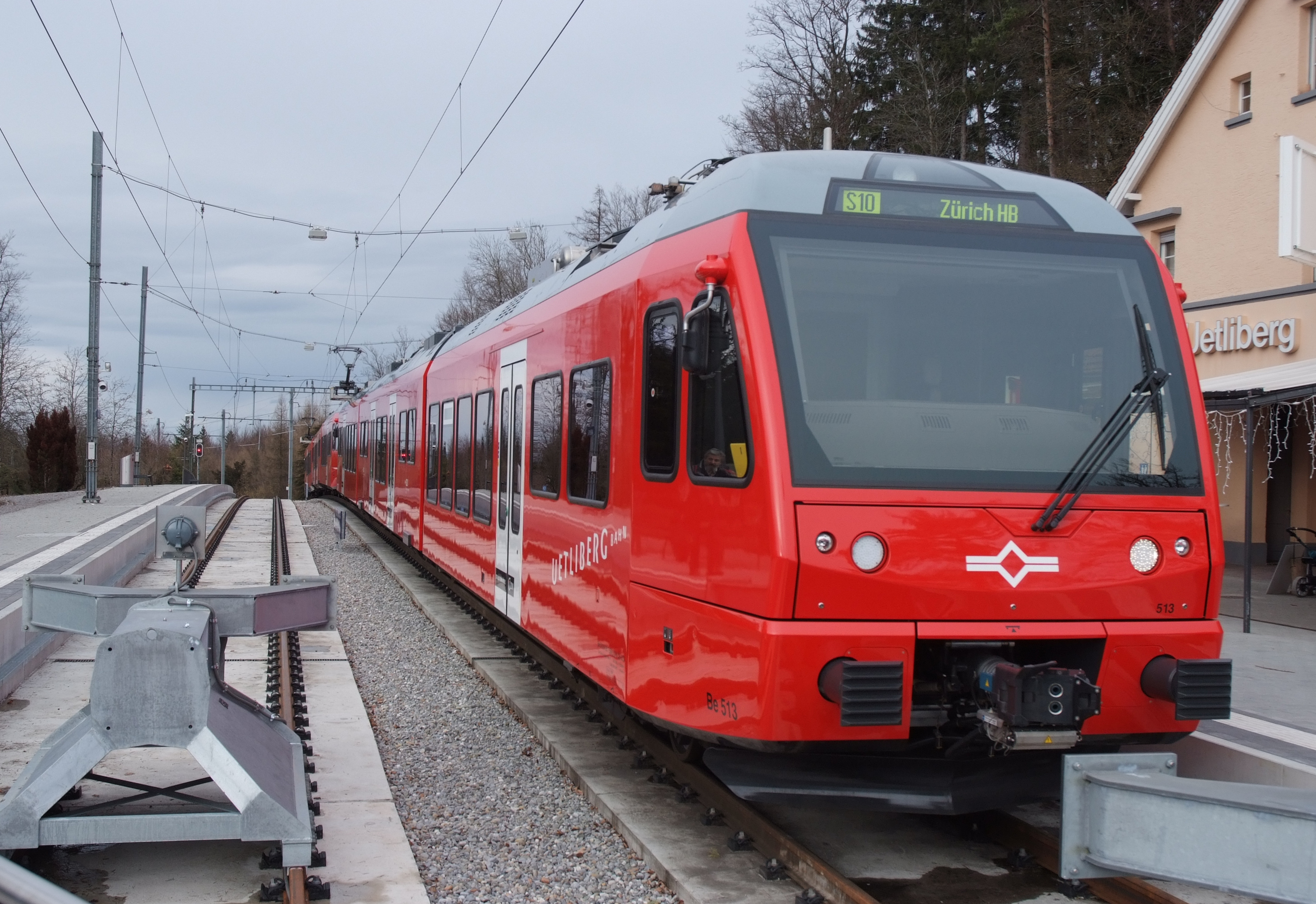
S10 service (Uetlibergbahn) at Uetliberg

The passenger services on the two lines form part of the Zurich S-Bahn, with the service over the Sihltalbahn to Sihlwald branded as the S4 and the Uetlibergbahn branded as the S10. The Sihltalbahn also includes a nighttime service during weekends (SN4). At Zürich Hauptbahnhof (Zürich HB), all SZU services depart from the subsurface Zürich HB SZU station located below Bahnhofplatz.

- Zurich S-Bahn:
  - S4 Zürich HB–Adliswil–Langnau-Gattikon (–Sihlwald)
    Hourly trains operate between Langnau-Gattikon and Sihlwald.
  - S10 Zürich HB–Zürich Triemli–Uetliberg
- Nighttime S-Bahn
  - SN4 Zürich HB–Adliswil–Langnau-Gattikon

=== Cable car ===
The cable car Luftseilbahn Adliswil-Felsenegg (LAF for short or commonly called Felseneggbahn) is operated by the SZU. Its valley station is within walking distance above Adliswil station. The cable car leads to Felsenegg, a popular hiking area.

=== Bus ===
The Zimmerbergbus lines in the district of Horgen, which provides a network of 166.5 km (103.5 mi) including 201 stops, is also operated by the SZU. The buses connects SZU stations in the Sihl Valley with railway stations on the western shore of Lake Zurich located on the Lake Zurich left bank railway line.

== Tariffs ==
The SZU was a founding member of the Zürcher Verkehrsverbund (ZVV) in May 1990 and the standard ZVV zonal fare tariffs apply to its services.

== See also ==
- List of railway companies in Switzerland
- Public transport in Zurich
- Rail transport in Switzerland
