= Philipp Landmark =

Swiss journalist

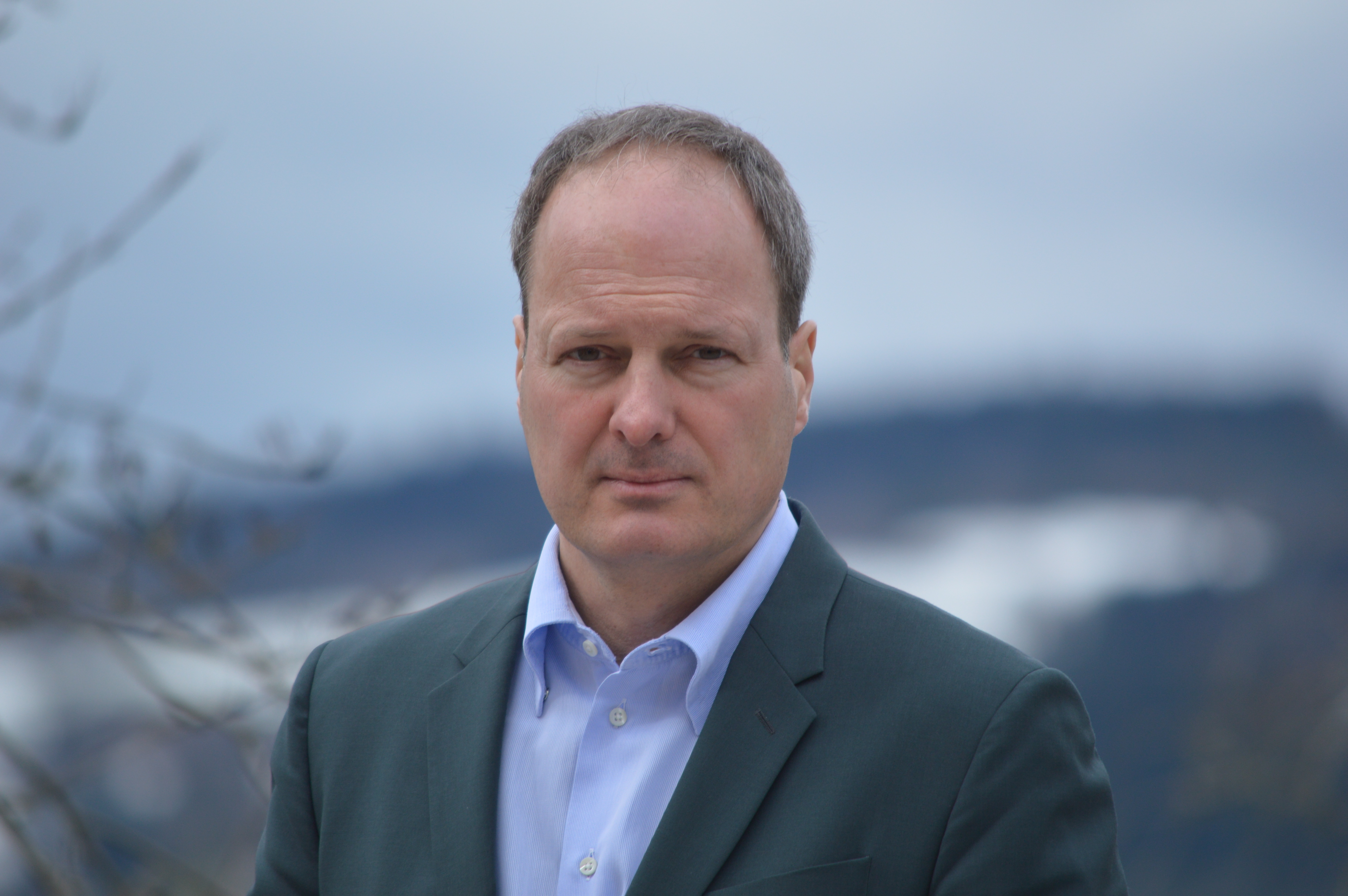
Philipp Landmark (2017)

Philipp Landmark (born 1966) is a Swiss journalist and former editor-in-chief of the St. Galler Tagblatt newspaper. He took up the post in 2009 and stood down at the end of April 2016.

== Life and career ==
Philipp Landmark grew up in Schaffhausen and was educated at the Kantonsschule there, where he took Matura examinations (A-level equivalent) in 1987. After graduation he started working as a volunteer trainee for the Schaffhauser Nachrichten newspaper, having acquired initial work experience with the newsroom whilst still at high school. In 1993, Landmark finished a one-year stint as a foreign correspondent in Oslo, and shortly after was recommended for promotion. He advanced to deputy editor of the Linth-Zeitung newspaper in Rapperswil, and subsequently assumed the editorship. At that time, he also worked on the merger of the Zürichsee-Zeitung newspaper.

Landmark returned to Schaffhausen in 1999, where he joined the Schaffhauser Nachrichten as head of the regional department and later became a senior editor. In 2006, he started working for St. Galler Tagblatt newspaper as head of editorial office, succeeding Gottlieb F. Höpli, who retired in the spring of 2009. Landmark held the post of editor-in-chief, as well as sitting on the board of directors. In February 2016, Landmark announced he would step down as editor of the St. Galler Tagblatt following a major reorganisation within the NZZ-Mediengruppe (NZZ Media Group), which involved a merger of several departments of the St. Galler Tagblatt with the Luzerner Zeitung. However, he remained available to work for the group on a number of media projects thereafter.

In the spring of 2017, Landmark founded Landmark Media GmbH with headquarters in the Innovation Center Startfeld in St. Gallen. The firm specializes in communications consultancy and training. In addition, Landmark continues to work as a journalist.
