= Zürisee =

Zürisee may refer to:

- The Swiss German/Alemannic name for Lake Zurich in Switzerland
- Obersee (Zürichsee), the smaller part of Lake Zurich
- Radio Zürisee, airing from Rapperswil
- Verkehrsbetriebe Zürichsee und Oberland
- Zürisee (ship, 1999), a car ferry that operates on Lake Zurich in Switzerland
- Zürichsee-Schifffahrtsgesellschaft, the Lake Zurich ship operator
- Zürichsee-Zeitung, a newspaper
