= Andreas Russenberger =

Swiss writer

Andreas Russenberger (born 1968, Speicher, Switzerland) is a Swiss writer and former bank manager.

== Biography ==
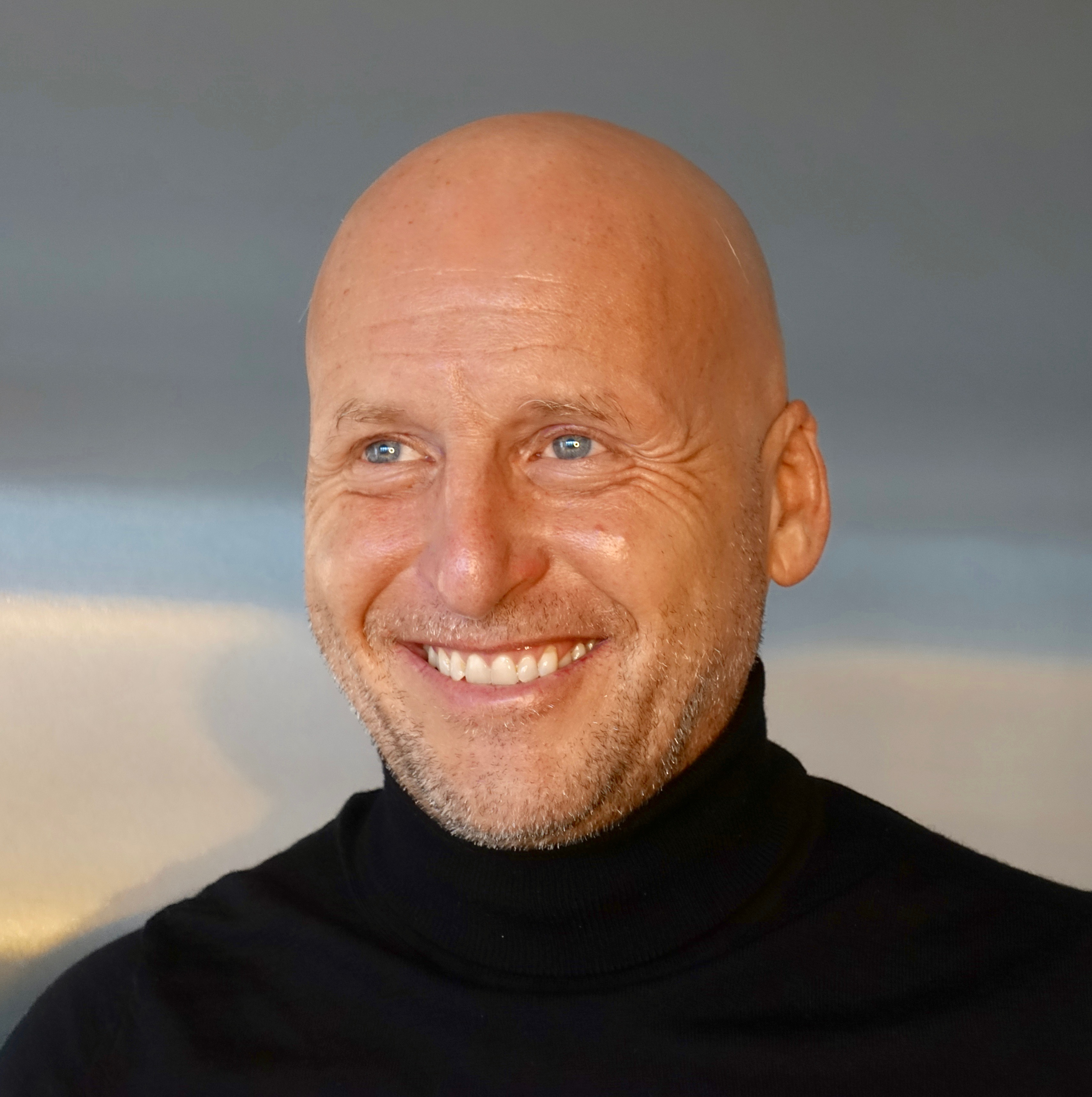
Andreas_Russenberger

Russenberger grew up in Speicher in the canton of Appenzell Ausserrhoden as the son of a home manager and a nurse. After graduating from the cantonal school in Trogen, he studied history and political science at the University of Zurich. He worked as a high school teacher and football coach during his studies He then switched to the financial sector and completed management training at the University of St. Gallen and Stanford University (US). Until 2015, he headed the global asset management of Credit Suisse as managing director and was a board member of Credit Suisse London. He worked in Europe, Asia, and the Americas.

Russenberger has been a full-time writer since 2017. His first political thriller, Die Kanzlerin (The Chancellor), was published in 2018. In 2020, he published his bestselling novel Paradeplatz, set in the Swiss banking milieu, with Gmeiner-Verlag. His third novel, Bahnhofsstrasse, was published in 2021. Russenberger performs readings throughout Switzerland and is also a guest at major literary festivals such as "Zürich liest". His novels are reviewed in the press (Tages-Anzeiger, Tagblatt der Stadt Zürich Zürichsee-Zeitung, St. Galler Tagblatt etc.). Russenberger lives with his family in Erlenbach on Lake Zurich. He competes as an Ironman athlete worldwide and is a Certified Ironman Coach. He is a member of the Swiss Authors' Association AdS, ProLitteris Switzerland, Kiwanis Zurich, and an alumnus of Zurich and Stanford Universities.

== Publications ==
- Bahnhofstrasse. Gmeiner-Verlag, Meßkirch, 2021. ISBN 978-3839268629
- Paradeplatz. Gmeiner-Verlag, Meßkirch 2020. ISBN 978-3839227466
- Die Kanzlerin. BoD, Norderstedt 2018 ISBN 978-3746051789
- Die Unternehmenstheorie der Zürcher Kantonalbank, Scientific Master Thesis, University of Zurich 1996
