= Felsenegg Tower =

Broadcasting tower in Zurich, Switzerland

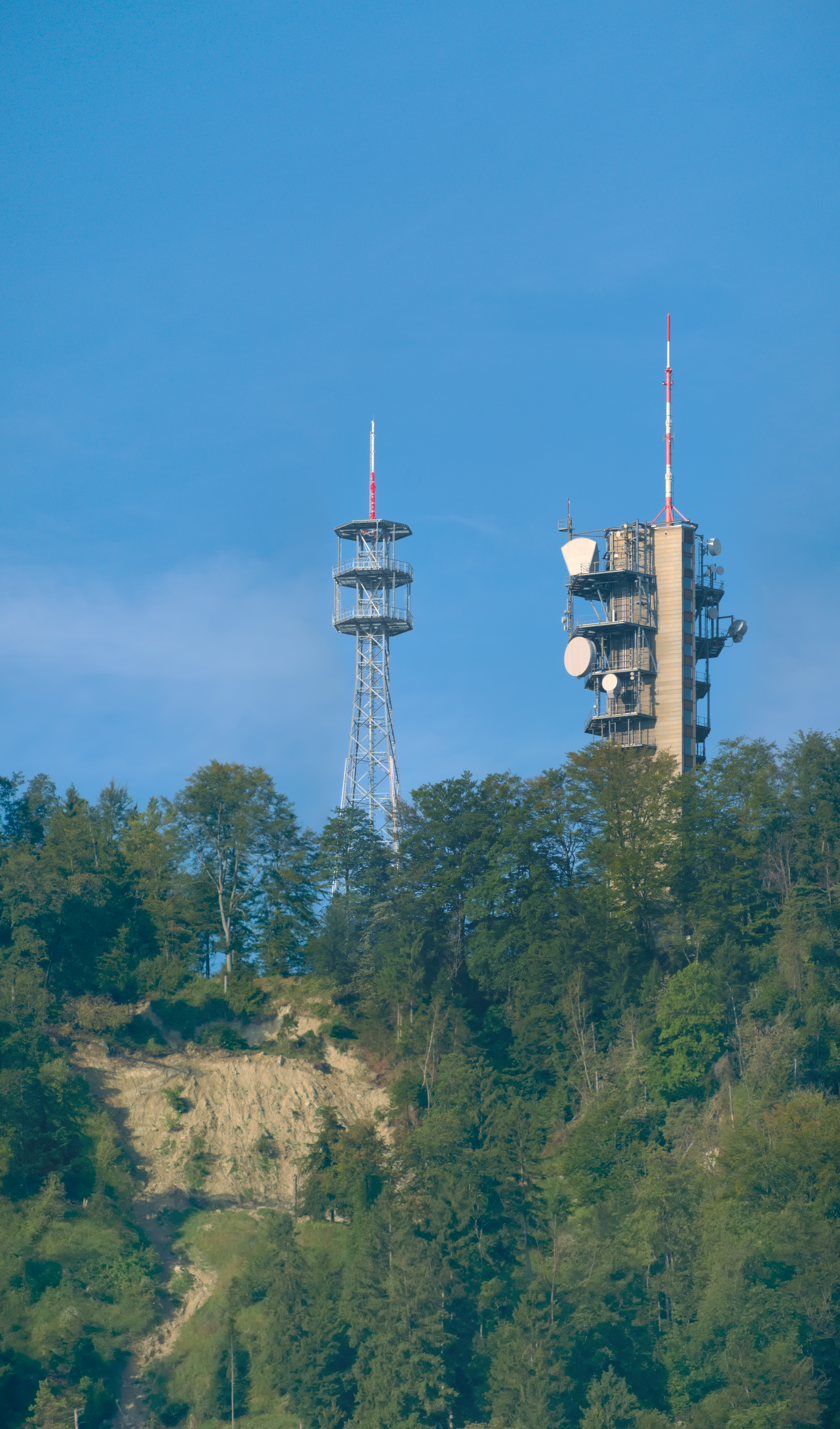
- New (left) and old (right) tower on Felsenegg

- Location of the Felsenegg Tower in the Canton of Zurich
- Location: Stallikon, Switzerland
- Tower height: 73.16 metres (240 ft)
- Coordinates: 47.3120°N 8.5061°E
- Built: 1963 (old tower); 2021 (new tower)
- Demolished: 2022 (old tower)

The Felsenegg Tower is a broadcasting tower located nearby Felseneggbahn mountain station on the Felsenegg vantage point in the canton of Zürich in Switzerland. The tower is owned by Swisscom Broadcast AG and generally not accessible by the public. The original tower of the same name from the 1960s was replaced by the current tower in 2021.

== History ==
=== Old tower ===
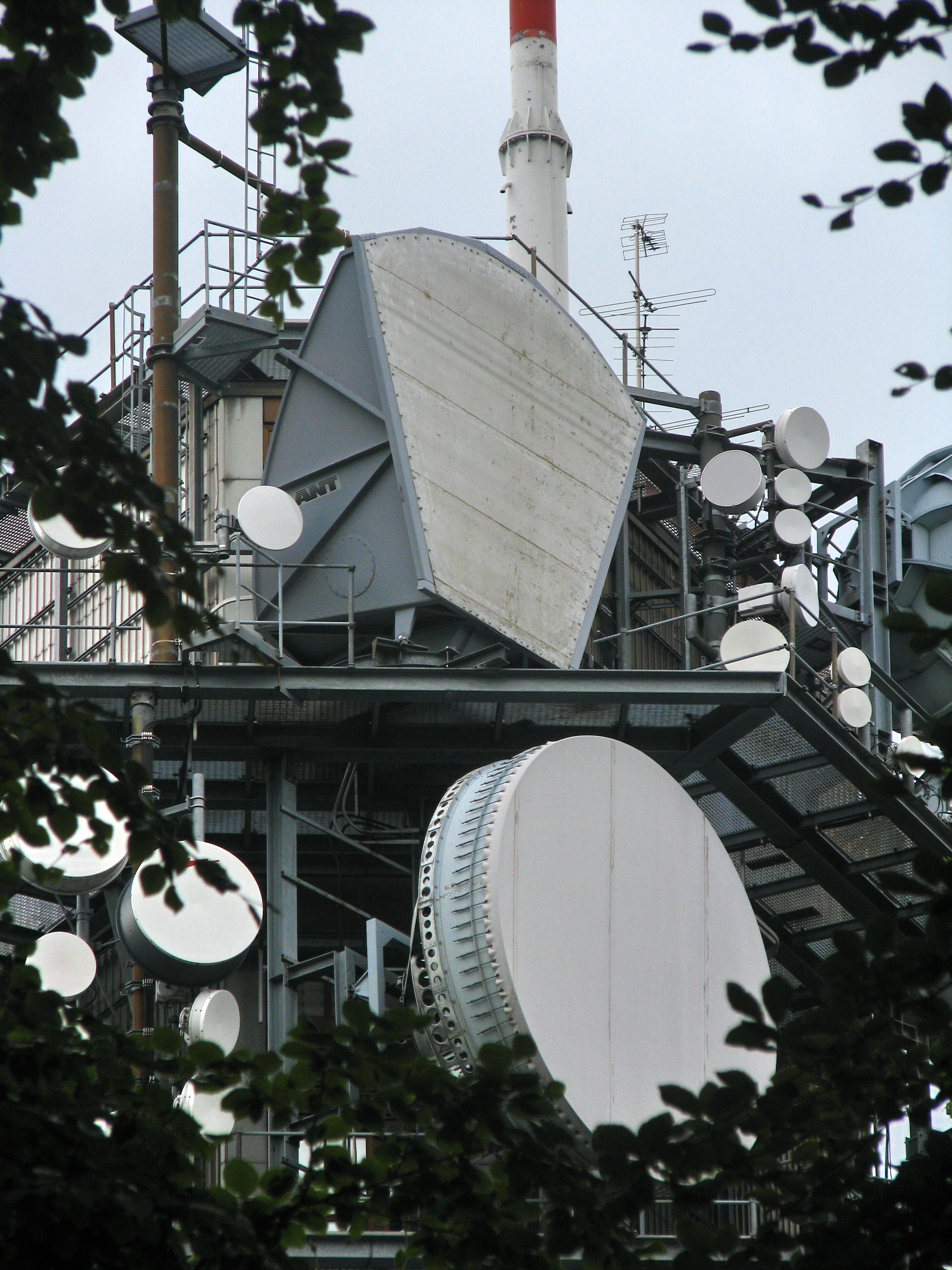
Closeup of the old tower's radio systems as seen from Felsensegg

The old Felsenegg Tower was built between 1959 and 1963 by architect Edwin Schoch from Zurich. Originally, it was designed for telephone transmission and broadcasting of radio and television programs. It was officially called Albis (abbreviated ALBS) by PTT (Swiss Telecom PTT, now Swisscom)

The tower's control centre allowed for conversion between the different standards in the Eurovision TV region. It was the connection point of many private TV stations in Switzerland, allowing them to connect to the national and international TV network. With the introduction of the REAL (German: Rechner Albis) system, it was possible to remote control antennas on 27 other Swisscom towers from the Felsenegg Tower. Over time, the tower grew less important, as the optical fiber technology began to replace microwave radio technology. Felsenegg still supplied directional radio and also FM broadcasting to stations like Radio Zürisee in Rapperswil. Since 2005, Skyguide maintains a radar station at the same location.

==== Technical data ====
The tower had a triangular form with cut edges, is 51 metres (167 ft) high and had a 22 metres (72 ft) high pole on its top. It had 16 floors and an underground building for technical equipment. The antennas were on the terraces of the 5 top floors and on the roof. For its directional radio system there were parabolic antennas, horn and shell antennas. The power for directional radio was quite small in comparison to the Uetliberg TV-tower: 10W at the maximum for a connection from Felsenegg to Chasseral of about 110 kilometres (68 mi).

=== New tower ===
==== Planning and construction ====
As the old tower neared the end of its lifespan, it was assessed as both in need of refurbishment, as well as oversized for modern usage. However, the old tower was put under cantonal cultural heritage protection in 2017, preventing major changes to the site. Only after extensive deliberations with cantonal authorities could the tower be released from protection in 2019.

In February 2020, Swisscom applied for planning permission, and in December 2020, construction of the new tower began at the same time as 30 metres of the old tower were removed while maintaining its broadcasting capability. The old tower stopped broadcasting at the end of October 2021 when the new one went online.

Deconstruction of the old tower lasted well into the service life of the new one and was not completed before mid-2022. Since detonation was not viable, the dismantling was carried out floor after floor by crane.

==== Technical data ====
The new tower is a four-legged truss tower of 73.16 metres (240.0 ft) height (including the 12 m (39 ft) lance). It is supported by four concrete foundations, which are anchored by steel tethers reaching 30 metres into the ground. Contrary to its predecessor, it features no interior, since it does not need to be staffed and since all technical installations were shrunk to fit underground.

The new tower acts as a relay transmitter for frequencies of the types VHF, DAB+, microwave, airband as well as LPWA for the Internet of things and telehousing. Like its predecessor, it does not contribute to any cellular network.
