= Uetliberg =

Mountain in the Swiss plateau

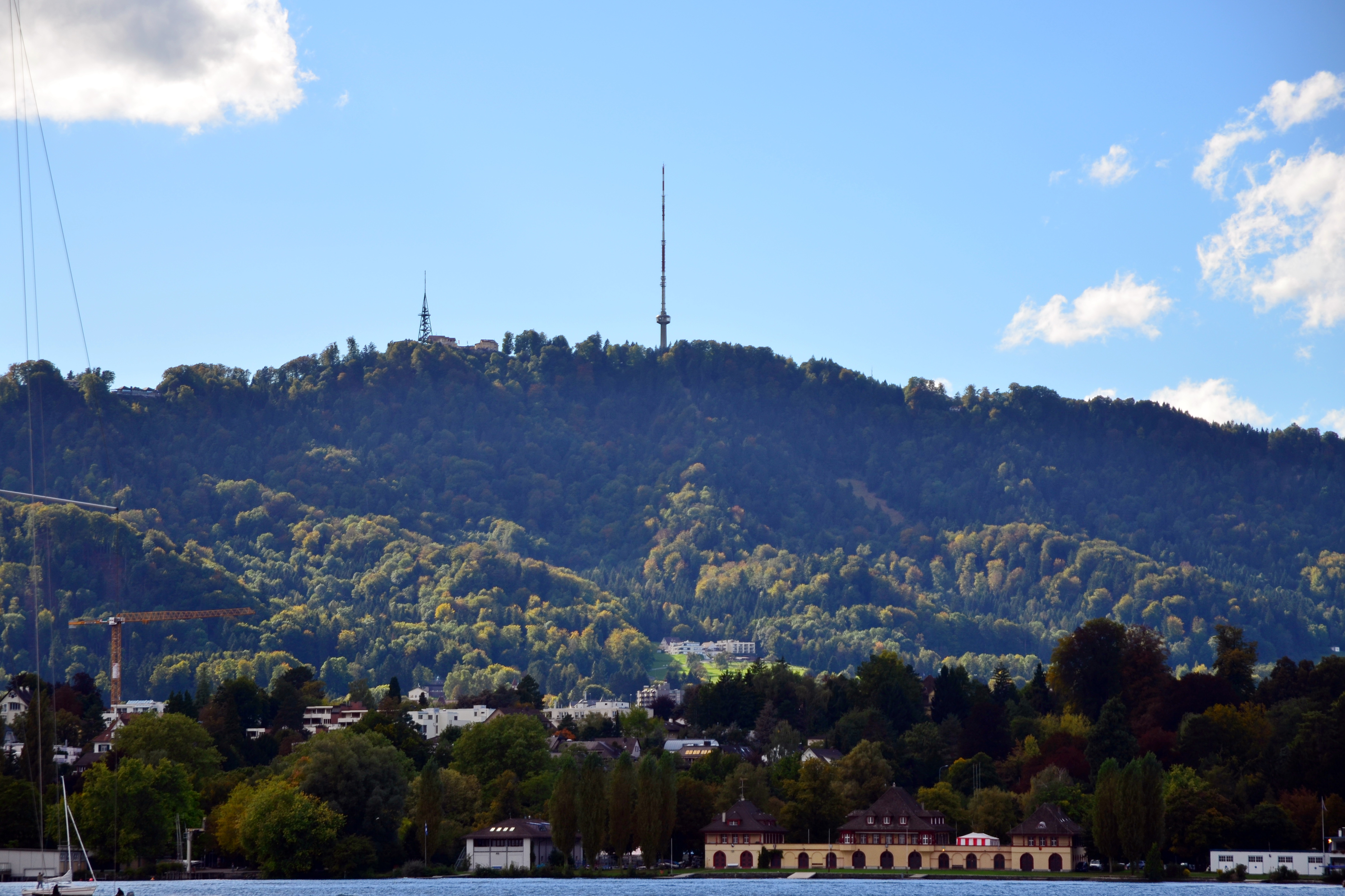
- View from Lake Zurich (east side)

Highest point
- Elevation: 870 m (2,850 ft)
- Prominence: 143 m (469 ft) (Note: The key col is located north of Balderen at 727 metres (2,385 ft).)
- Parent peak: Bürglen
- Isolation: 6.9 km (4.3 mi) (Note: The nearest point of higher elevation is northwest of the Langnauer Berg.)
- Coordinates: 47°20′58″N 8°29′29″E

Naming
- Native name: Uetliberg (German)
- Pronunciation: ˈyɛtlibɛrɡ

Geography
- Location within Switzerland
- Location: Zurich, Switzerland
- Parent range: Albis
- Topo map: Swisstopo

Climbing
- Easiest route: Uetliberg railway

Aerial view by Walter Mittelholzer (1919)

The Uetliberg (also known as Üetliberg) (Note: The spelling used by Swisstopo is Uetliberg and defines the official naming. Historically also Ütliberg, Utliberg, Uto, or ütliberg am Albiß) (Note: The name is derived from that of the castle formerly near the summit, recorded in 1210 as Uotelenburg (destroyed in 1268). The name of the castle is in turn from an Alemannic personal name in Uotal-; the possible connection to Odilo, count of Thurgau between 709 and 736, is a suggestion of Josef Siegwart.) is a mountain in the Swiss Plateau, the northernmost part of the Albis chain, rising to 870 m (2,850 ft). The mountain offers a panoramic view of the entire city of Zürich (to the northeast of its summit), Zürichberg and Lake Zurich (both to the east), and lies on the boundary between the city of Zurich and the municipalities of Stallikon and Uitikon in the canton of Zurich. The summit, known as Uto Kulm, is in Stallikon. Uetliberg is the Hausberg of Zurich.

At the summit, there is the Hotel Uto Kulm, together with two towers. One of these is a look-out tower (access costs CHF 2, rebuilt 1990), whilst the other is the 186 m (610 ft) tall Uetliberg TV-tower (rebuilt 1990).

== Transport ==
The summit is accessible year-round by train from Zurich. Uetliberg railway station lies some 812 m (2,664 ft) from, and 68 m (223 ft) below, the summit of the Uetliberg. It is the upper terminus of the Uetliberg line from Zurich Central Station (Zürich HB), which is operated by Zurich S-Bahn service S10. Trains usually run every half-hour, taking 20 minutes. At Zürich HB, trains depart from the subsurface Zürich HB SZU station.

== Hiking and biking ==
There are numerous walking paths leading up to the top from Albisgüetli, Zürich Triemli or Albisrieden, with frequent water fountains and camping spots. Uetliberg also has a downhill mountain bike track which starts in the camping area at the top of the mountain and finishes next to Triemli railway station, also served by the S10. A panoramic footpath leads along the crest of the Albis ridge to Felsenegg, from where the Adliswil-Felsenegg cable car connects to Adliswil and the S4 S-Bahn service in the valley below.

== Name ==
The Uetliberg gives its name to the Zurich-based Uto section of the Swiss Alpine Club, and hence to the Uto Peak in the Selkirk Mountains of Canada, which was first climbed by members of the Uto section.

== Gallery ==
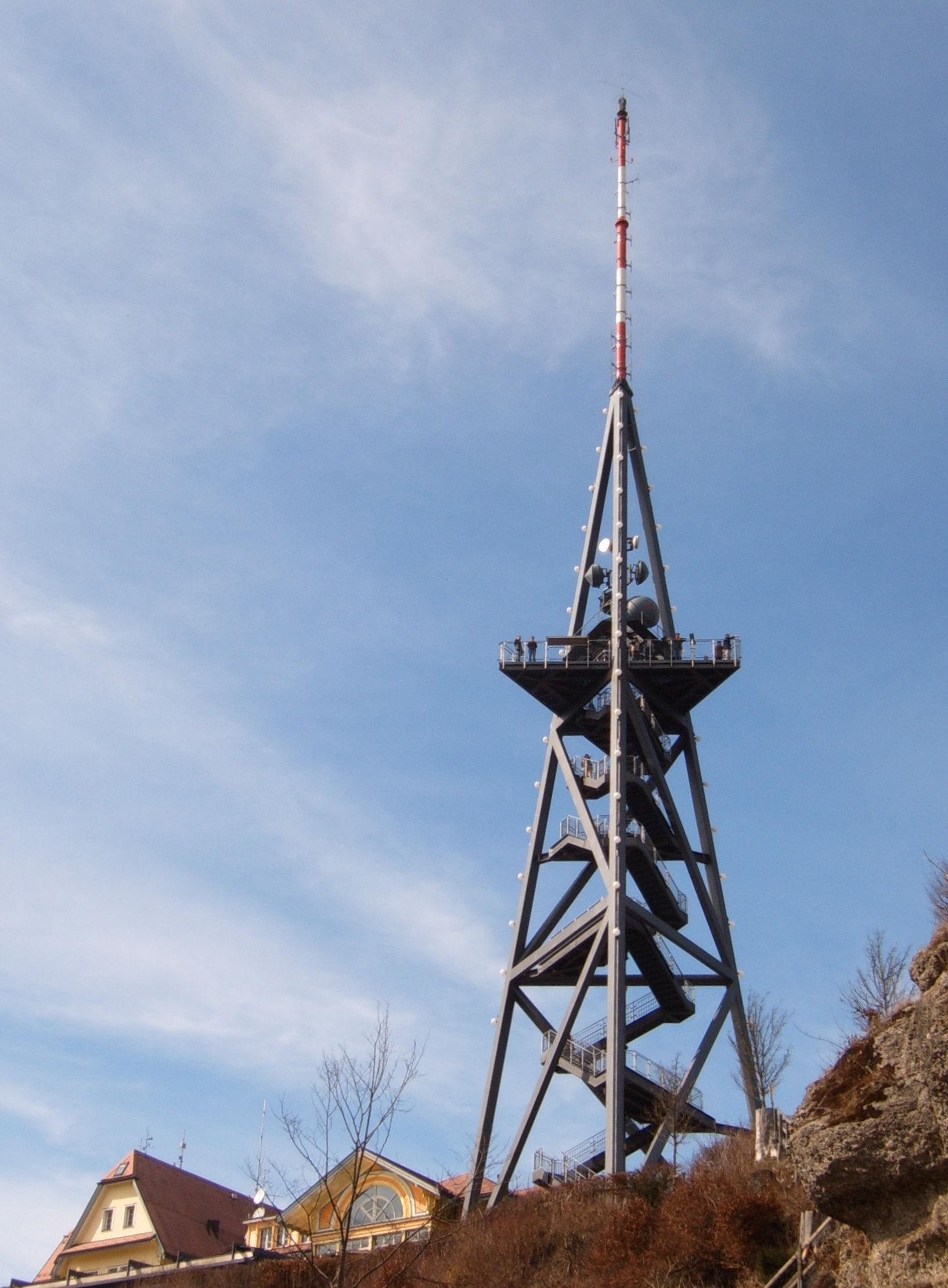
Uetliberg look-out tower.

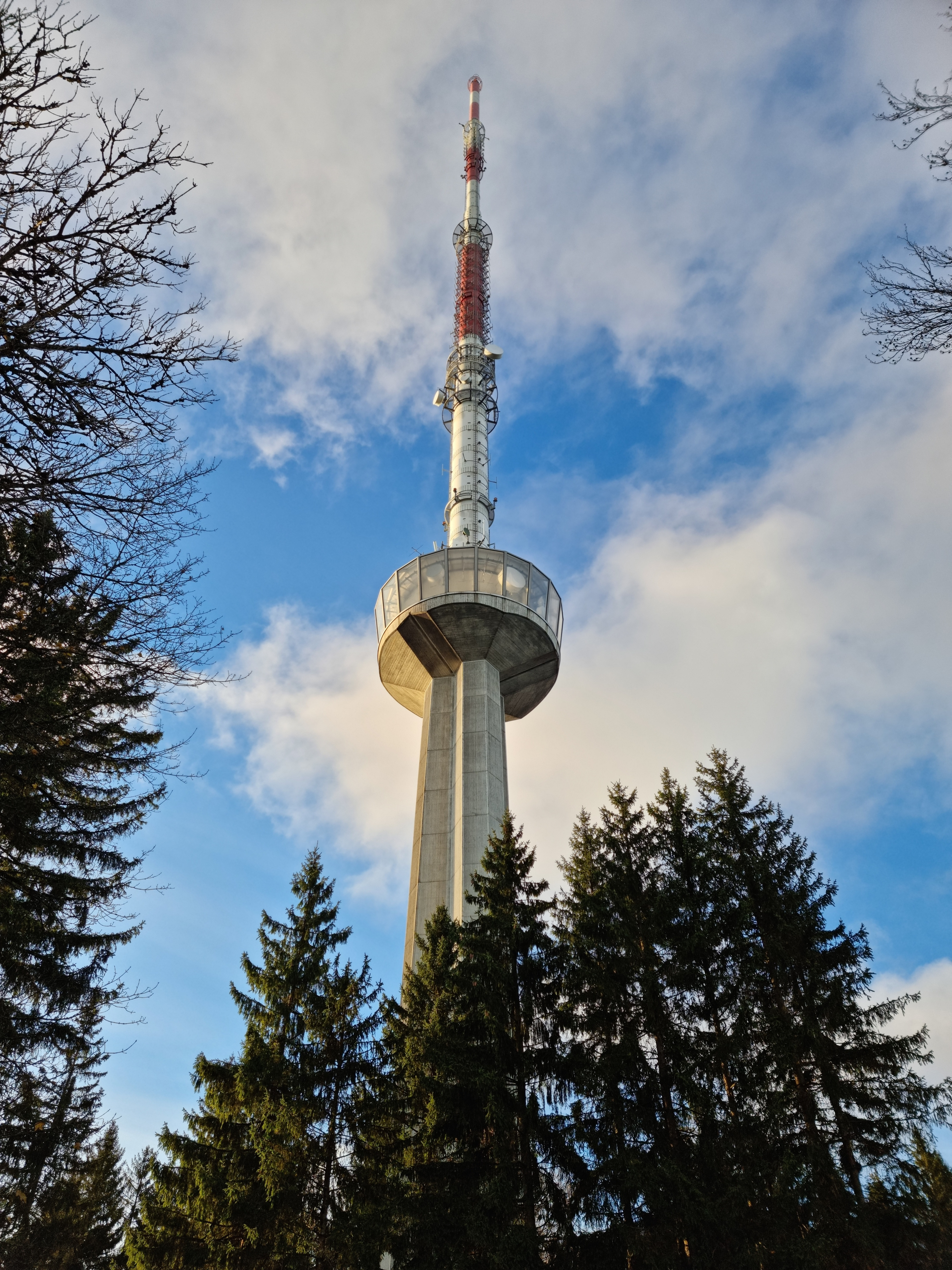
Uetliberg TV-tower.

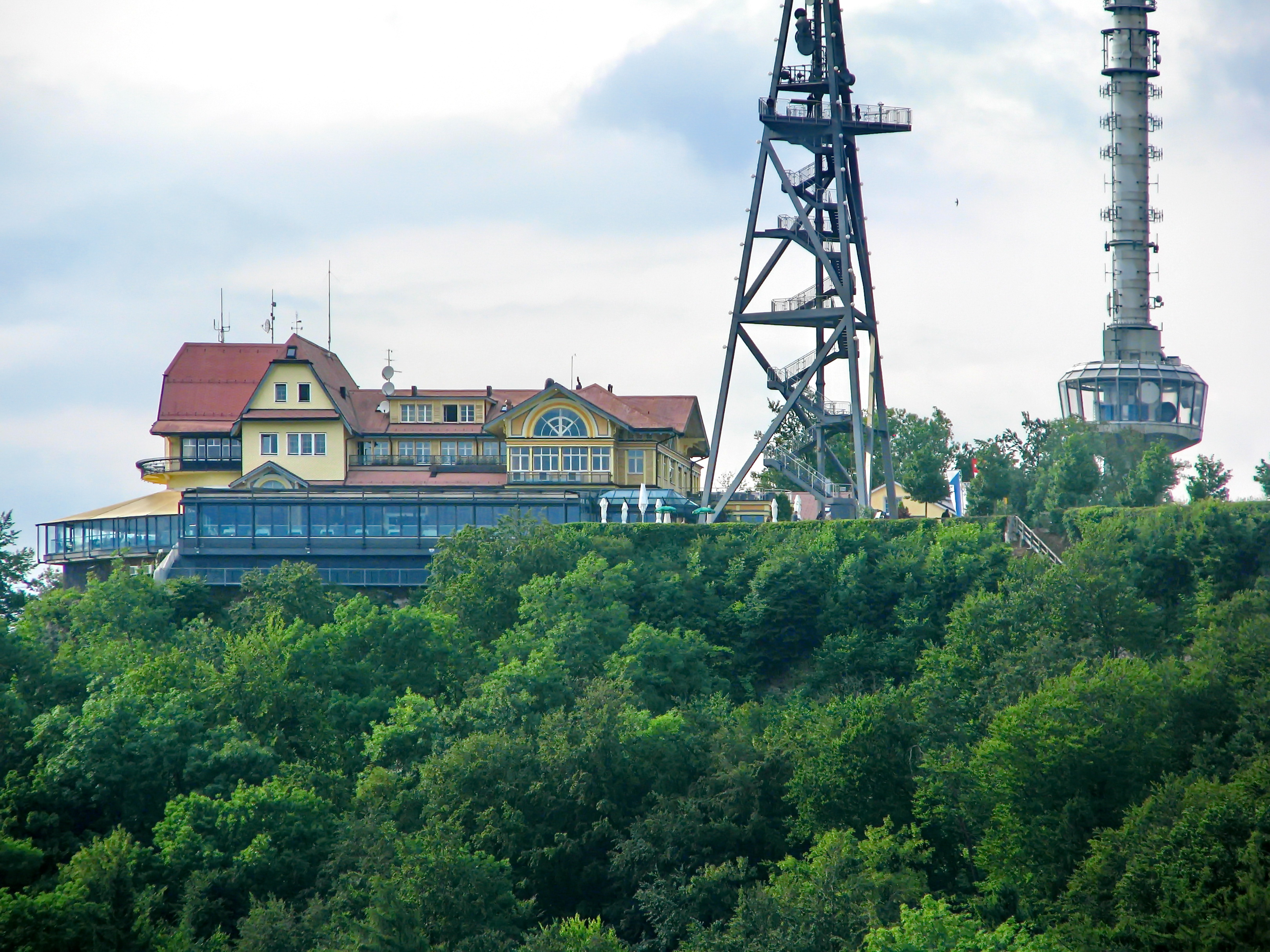
Uto Kulm (Top of Zurich) with observation and TV-tower.

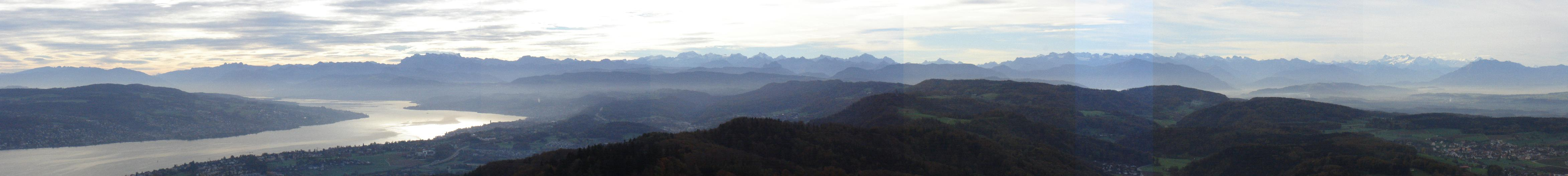
Panoramic composite image of the Swiss Alps from the top of the Uetliberg (facing south).

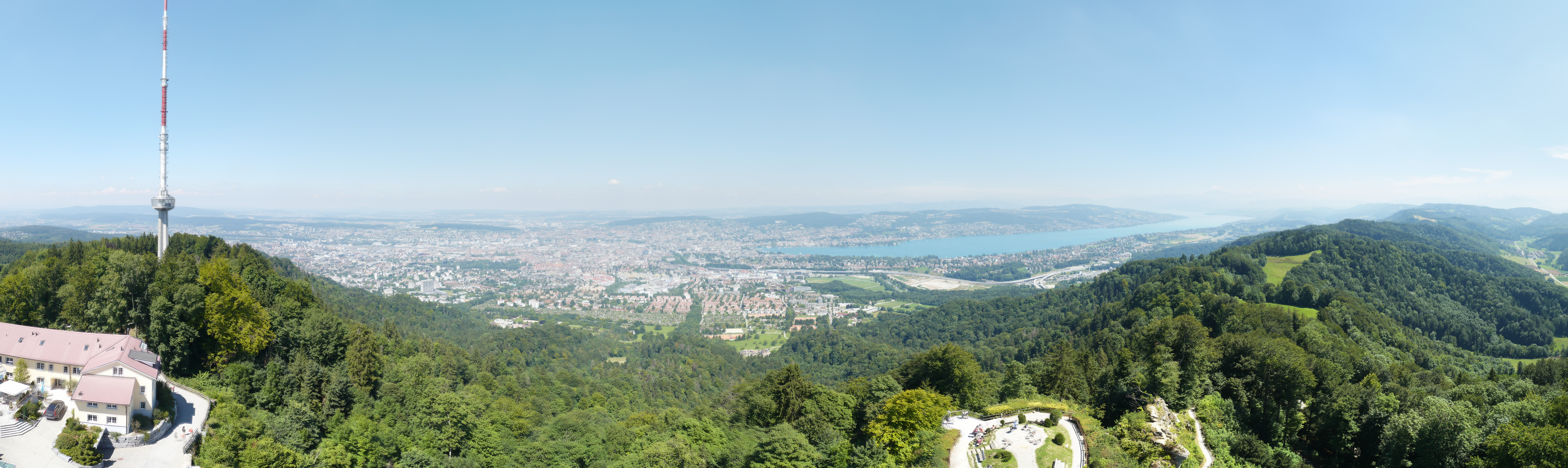
View from the Uetliberg of Zurich, looking east

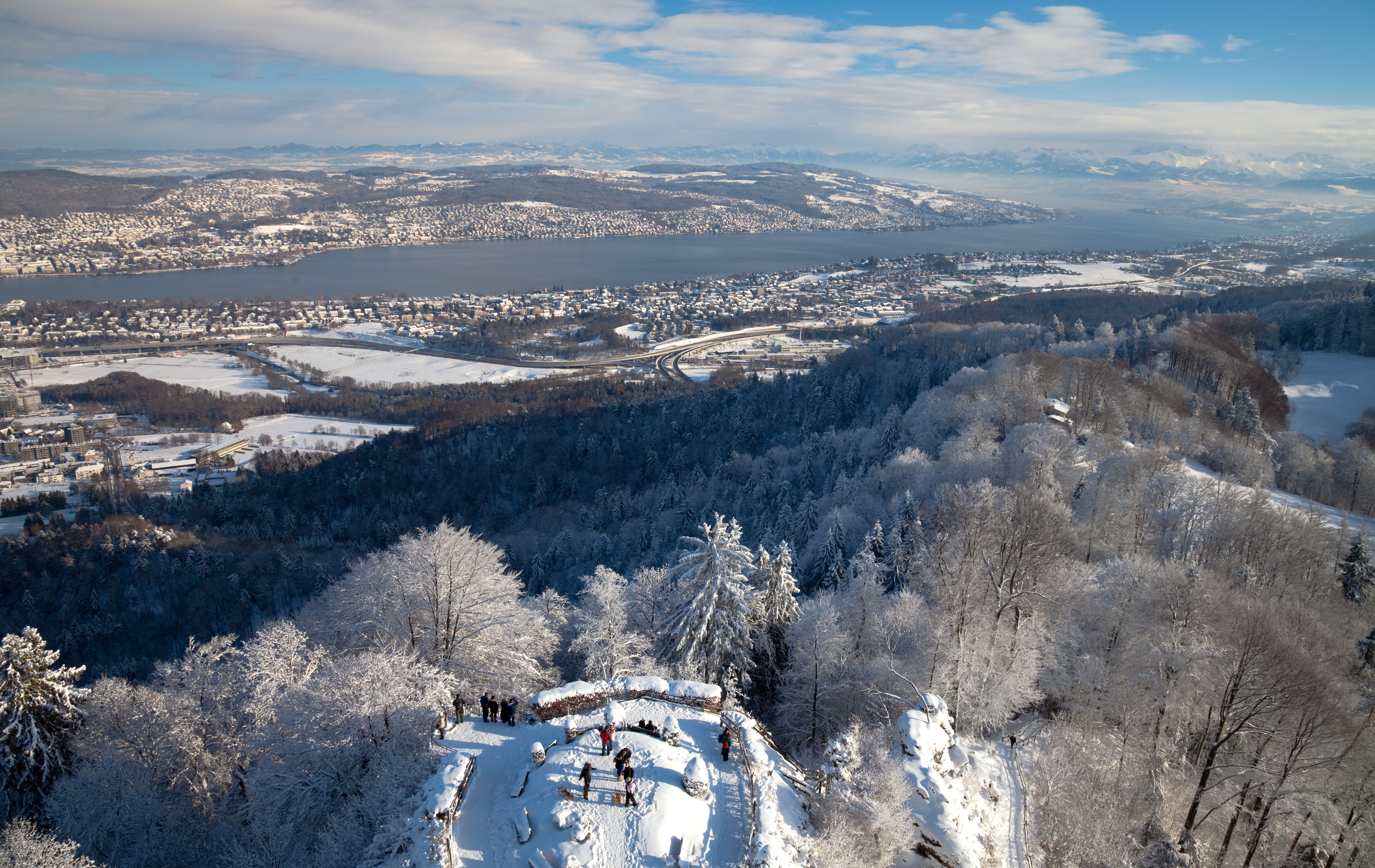
Panoramic view from the top of the observation tower next to the Uto Kulm hotel.

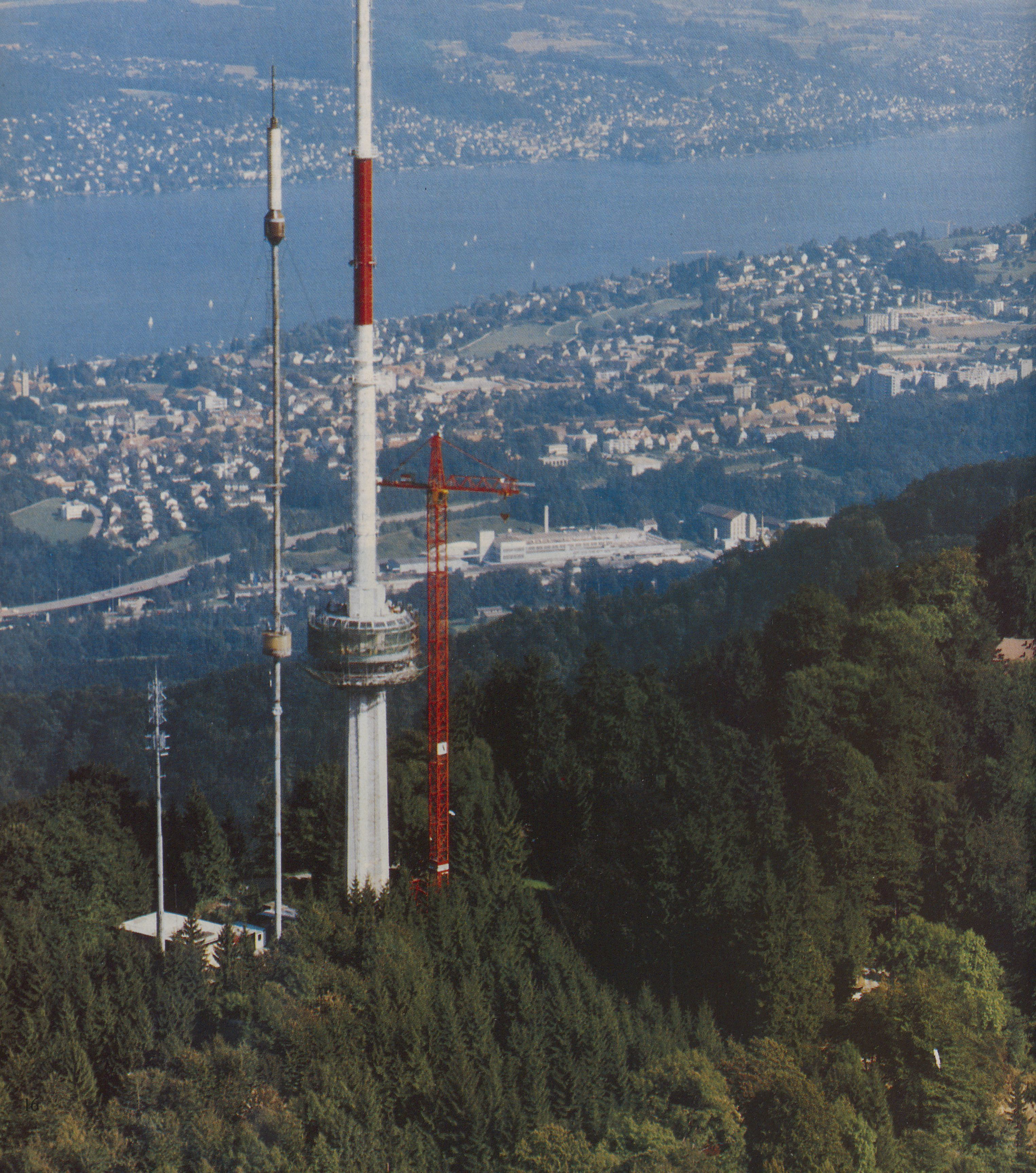
Aerial view 1990

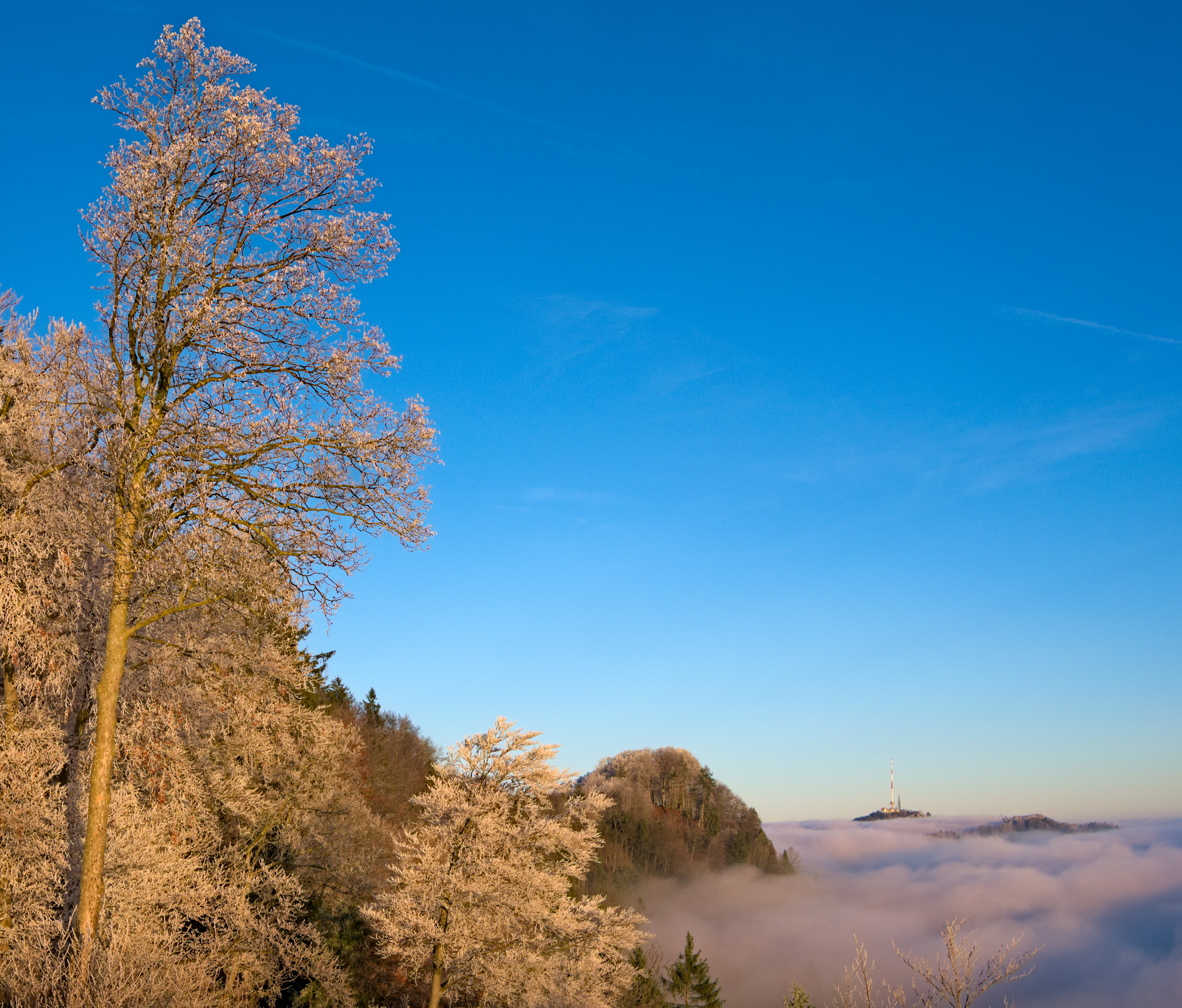
Uetliberg over a sea of clouds as seen from Felsenegg

== See also ==
- Oppidum Uetliberg
- List of mountains of Switzerland accessible by public transport
