= Oppidum Uetliberg =

La Tène era oppidium

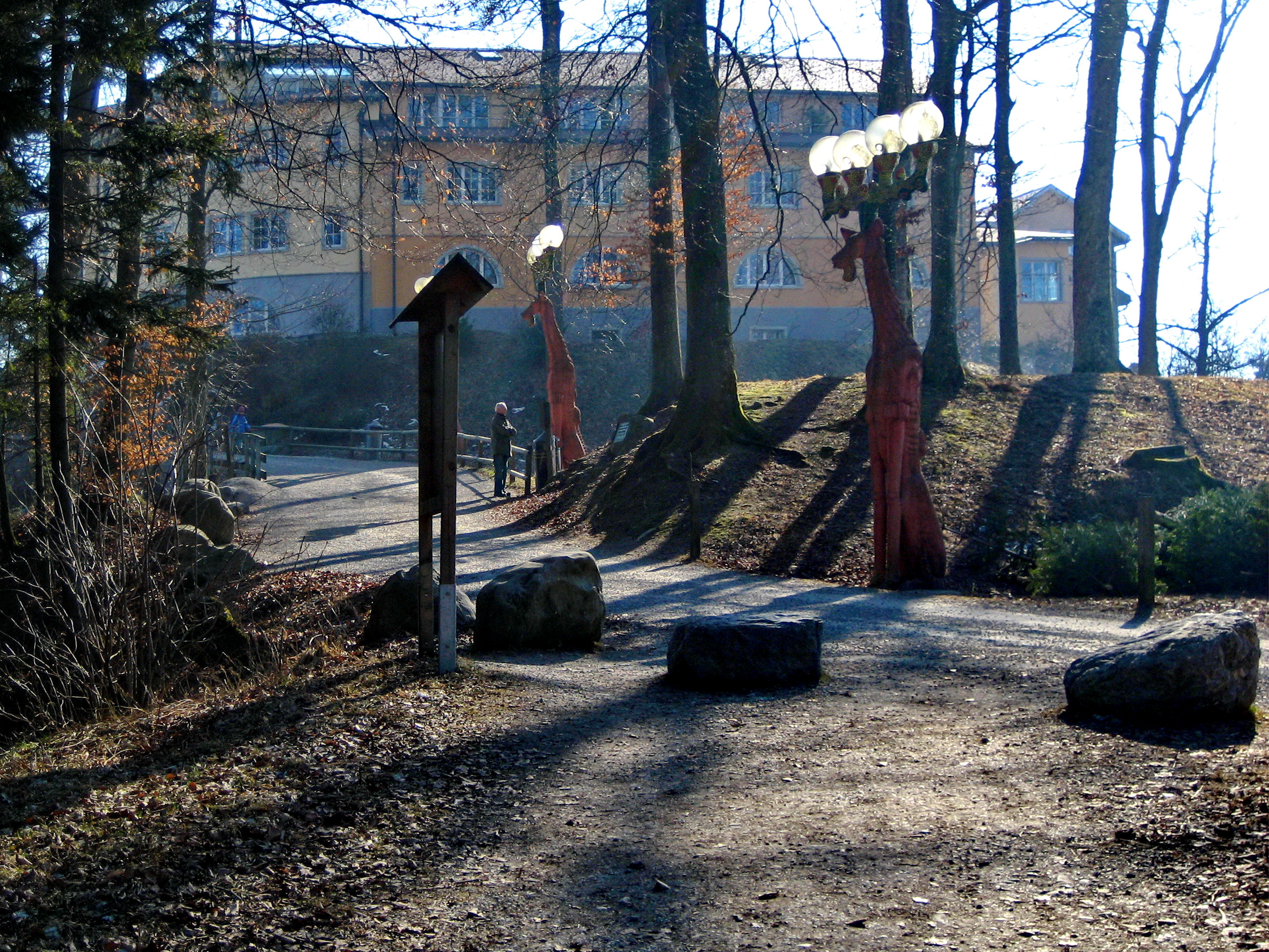
- Remains of the wall system at Uto Kulm

- Location within Switzerland
- 47°20′57″N 8°29′26″E
- Type: Oppidum
- Periods: early La Tène or late Hallstatt to late Antiquity
- Cultures: Celts
- Location: Uetliberg, Stallikon
- Region: Zürich

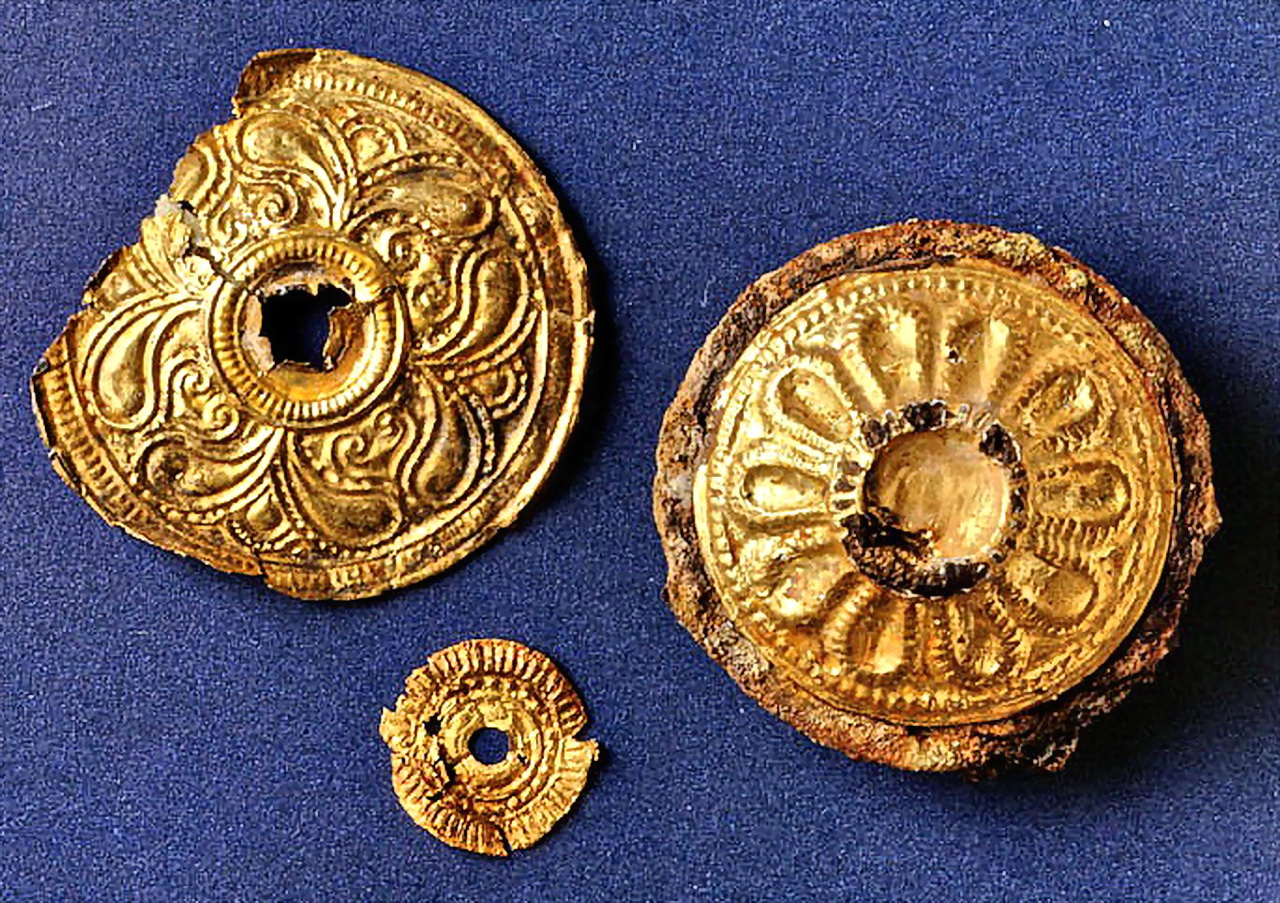
Gold disk jewelry from the Sonnenbühl burial

Oppidum Uetliberg was a La Tène era oppidum located near the top of the hill Uetliberg in what is now the Swiss canton of Zurich (Stallikon municipality, just outside the city of Zurich).

It is one of the most important Iron Age fortifications in Switzerland, dating the very early La Tène or the late Hallstatt period (c. 500 BC). Early excavations on the Üetliberg were made in the 1830s and 1860s. A 5th century BC burial field was destroyed when the Üetliberg railway was built in 1874.

The fortified area was at a height of between 820 and 873 metres above sea level, surrounded by a system of earth walls extending to a maximal width of up to 2 km. Outside the settlement area the so-called Fürstengrab Sonnenbühl, a rich burial of a 5th-century BC female. The toponym Uetliberg itself may continue the Celtic name of the site, although its exact derivation remains uncertain.

The top of mount Uetliberg was settled from at least the Neolithic, amply documented in a total of some 60,000 small finds, the oldest artefacts dating to about 4000 BC. There was a village-like settlement on the site by the late Bronze Age (Urnfield culture). The fortifications were built in the 5th century BC, corresponding to the early Celtic culture which would emerge as the Helvetii in Roman ethnography of the 1st century BC. The walls had a height of up to 14 m and a width of up to 35 m, enclosing a large settlement on the slope, with two inner rings of fortifications protecting the core areas, one at Aegerten–Plateau (now the site of the Üetliberg television tower), the other at Uto Kulm (now the site of the look-out tower). The fortifications presumably remained in use for more than four centuries, until the Roman conquest in the 1st century BC.

In the 1st century BC, a smaller oppidum was built on the level of the lake, at the Limmat (Lindenhof hill). By 15 BC, the site came to lie on the border of the Roman provinces of Raetia and Germania superior. The hill fortress was presumably now manned by a Roman garrison protecting the tax collection point at vicus of Turicum at the egress of Lake Zurich. The hill fortress presumably retained some strategic importance until the collapse of the Roman Empire in the 5th century. It is probable that the same site was again fortified as a refuge fort in the Early Middle Ages by the Alemanni and the later Carolingian rulers. This was a purely military fortress, much smaller than the fortified settlement of the Iron Age. The fortress was eventually extended into a medieval castle (the Uotelenburg, Üetliburg) in the 10th to 12th centuries, owned by the lords of Regensberg, and finally destroyed by Zurich, at the time allied with Rudolf von Habsburg, in a war with the house of Regensberg.

== Bibliography ==
- P. Nagy: Befestigungen im Üetliberggebiet. Stiftung für die Erforschung des Üetlibergs (ed.). Zürich 1997.
- Sabine Bolliger et al.: Siedlungsgeschichte im Gebiet des Üetlibergs. Stiftung für die Erforschung des Üetlibergs (eds.). Zürich 1993.
- Irmgard Bauer, Lotti Frascoli, Heinz Pantli, Anita Siegfried, Thierry Weidmann, Renata Windler et al.: Üetliberg, Uto–Kulm: Ausgrabungen 1980–1989. Band A (Textband) und Band B (Katalog, Tafeln, Listen). Archäologische Monographien Band 9, Kantonsarchäologie Zürich (ed.). Zürich 1991.
- Walter Drack, Paul Guyer et al.: Der Üetliberg. Silva–Verlag, Zürich 1984.
- Emil Vogt, Ernst Meyer, Hans Conrad Peyer: Zürich von der Urzeit zum Mittelalter. Zürich 1971.
