= Radio Zürisee =

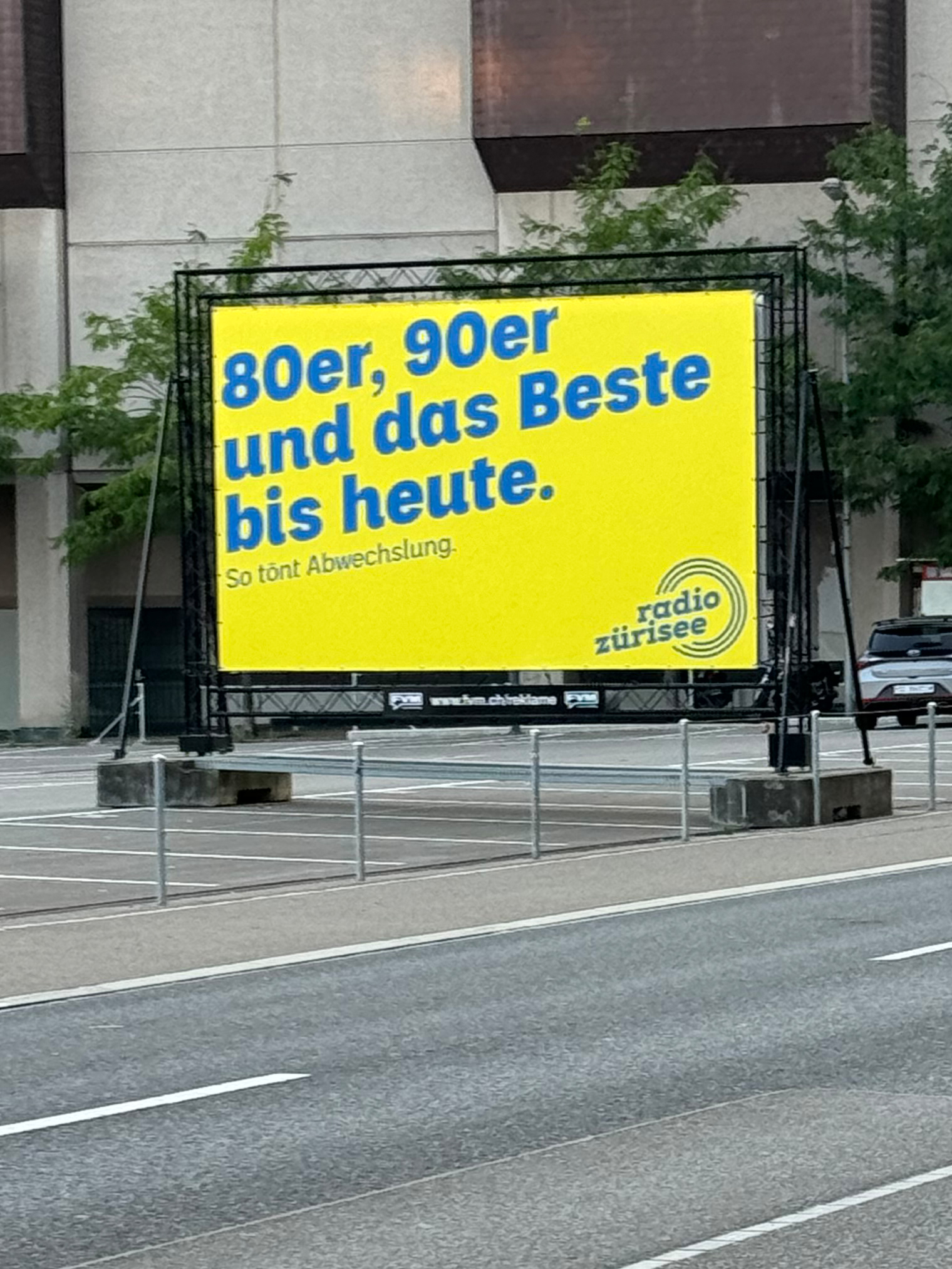
- Billboard for Radio Zürisee in Rapperswil-Jona
- Rapperswil, Switzerland; Switzerland
- Broadcast area: Swiss cantons of Glarus, Schaffhausen, Schwyz, St. Gallen and Zürich
- Frequency: 107.4 MHz

Programming
- Language: German
- Format: 80s, 90s Adult Contemporary
- Affiliations: AMARC

Ownership
- Owner: Zürichsee Medien AG

History
- First air date: 1 November 1983; 42 years ago

Technical information
- Transmitter coordinates: 47°13′31.45″N 8°48′59.82″E
- Translators: DAB+, Cable, Internet
- Repeaters: Etzel, Felsenegg-Girstel TV-tower, Bachtel, Uetliberg and some more

Links
- Webcast: radiozuerisee.ch/channels
- Website: radiozuerisee.ch

Radio Zürisee (stylized radio zürisee; literally Radio Zürichsee), is a privately owned Swiss radio station based in Rapperswil on the shore of the Lake Zurich in the canton of St. Gallen.

== History ==
Radio Zürisee was launched on 1 November 1983 in occasion of the licensing of private radio stations in Switzerland, as one of the first alternatives to the Swiss government-owned radio stations. In 2008, the station was allowed to establish a correspondent at the Bundeshaus by the Swiss government – the Bundeshaus Radio is airing for all 16 private radio stations from the sessions of the Swiss parliament assembly in the capital city. Radio Zürisee moved in 1994 from Stäfa to Rapperswil to a location opposite of the Rapperswil railway station, from where it is still airing. In 2011, the Bernese radio Capital FM was bought by the Zürichsee Medien AG from Tamedia.

Theodor Gut junior, editor in chief of the Zürichsee-Zeitung from 1953 to 1987, initiated the transition of his newspaper to a non-partisan forum newspaper, and the company expanded in 1983 to get involved in Radio Zürisee. Radio Zürisee is owned by the Zürichsee Medien AG in Stäfa, i.e. it is organized as an Aktiengesellschaft having a share capital of 1,500,000 Swiss Francs, of which 77% are held by the owner. In 2013 a turnover of 5,29 million Swiss Francs was resulted.

== Broadcast and program ==
Broadcast in the Swiss cantons of Glarus, Schaffhausen, Schwyz, St. Gallen and Zürich, the radio station has an audience of about 220,000 people aged between about 20 and 40 years. Radio Zürisee currently focuses on music from the 80s and 90s, complemented by a content mix that includes entertainment, events, and news tailored for the region. The radio station is very active in advertising, merchandising and is present nearly on every event of meaning within Switzerland.

== Gallery ==
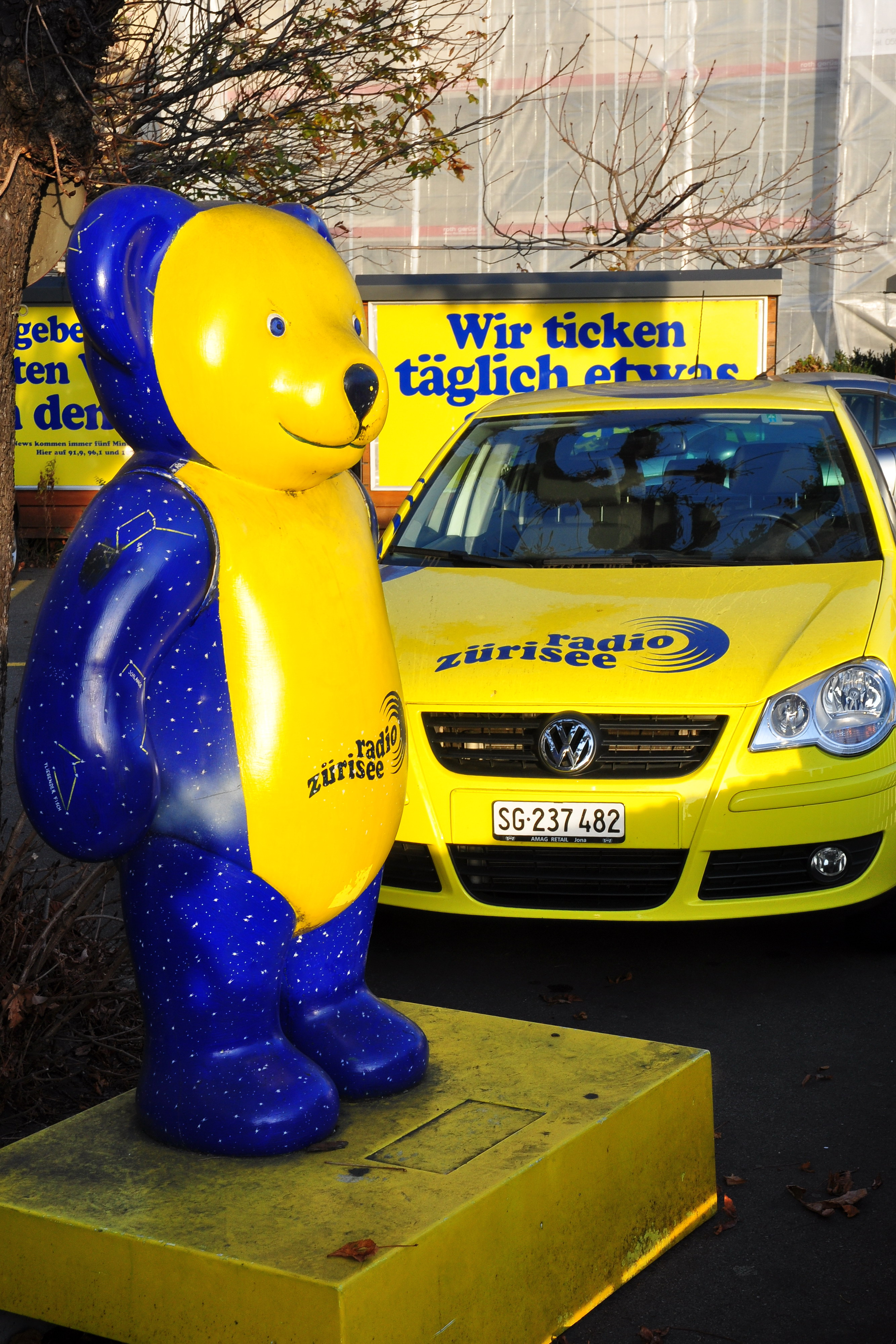
Züri Bär at the studio in Rapperswil

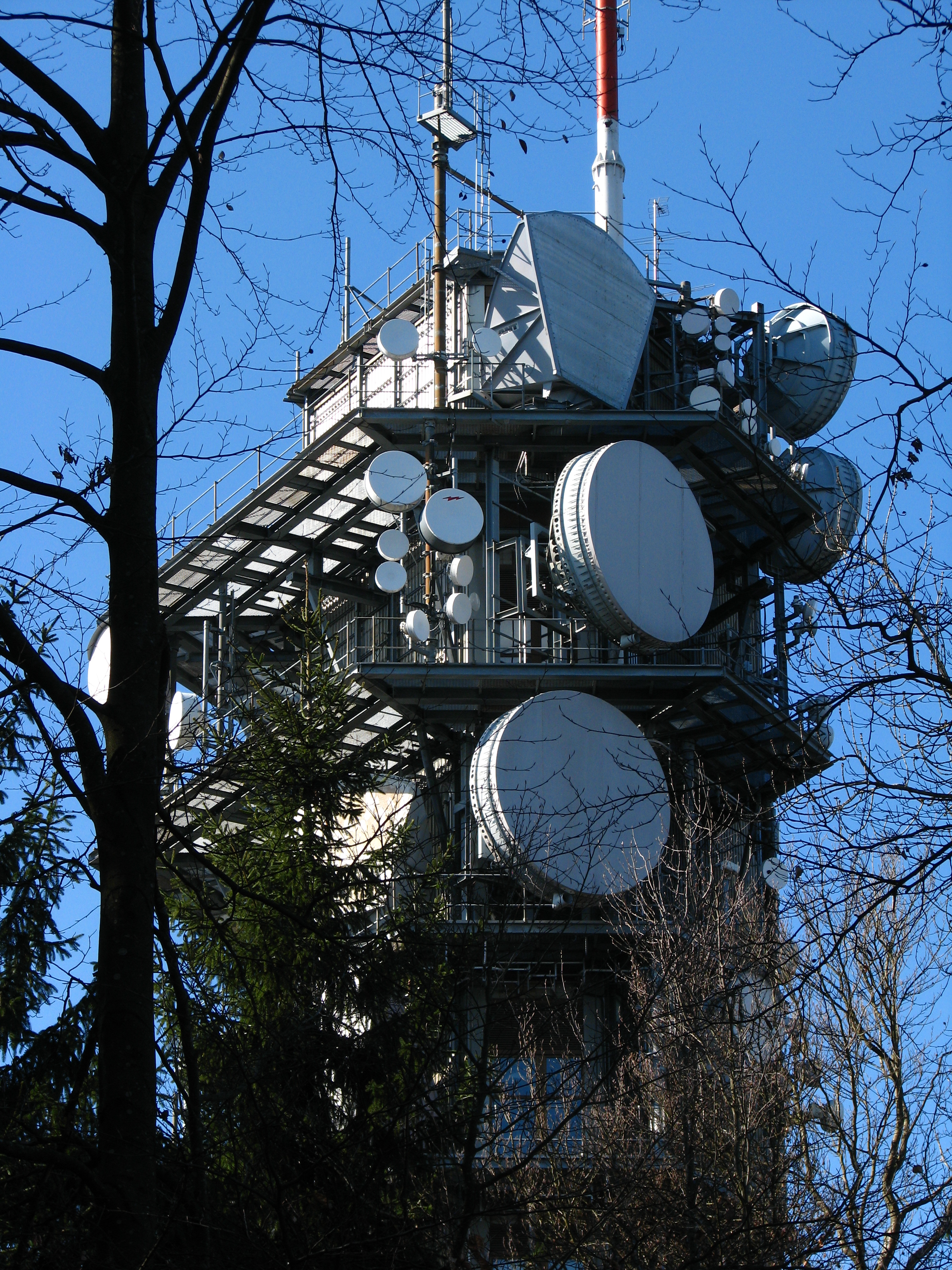
Felsenegg-Girstel TV-tower on Felsenegg mountain

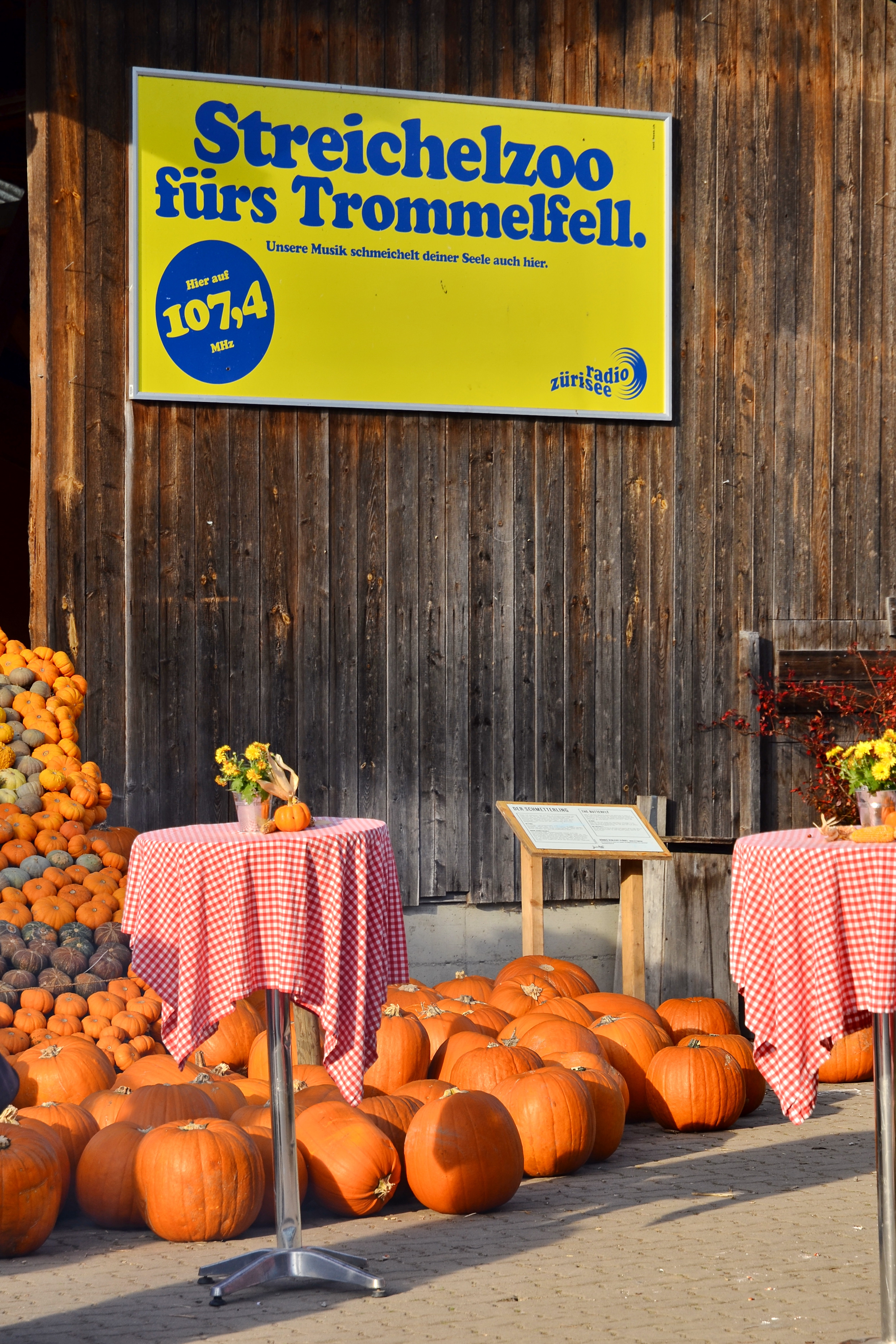
advertising at the Jucker Farm's pumpkin festival in October 2014 and ...

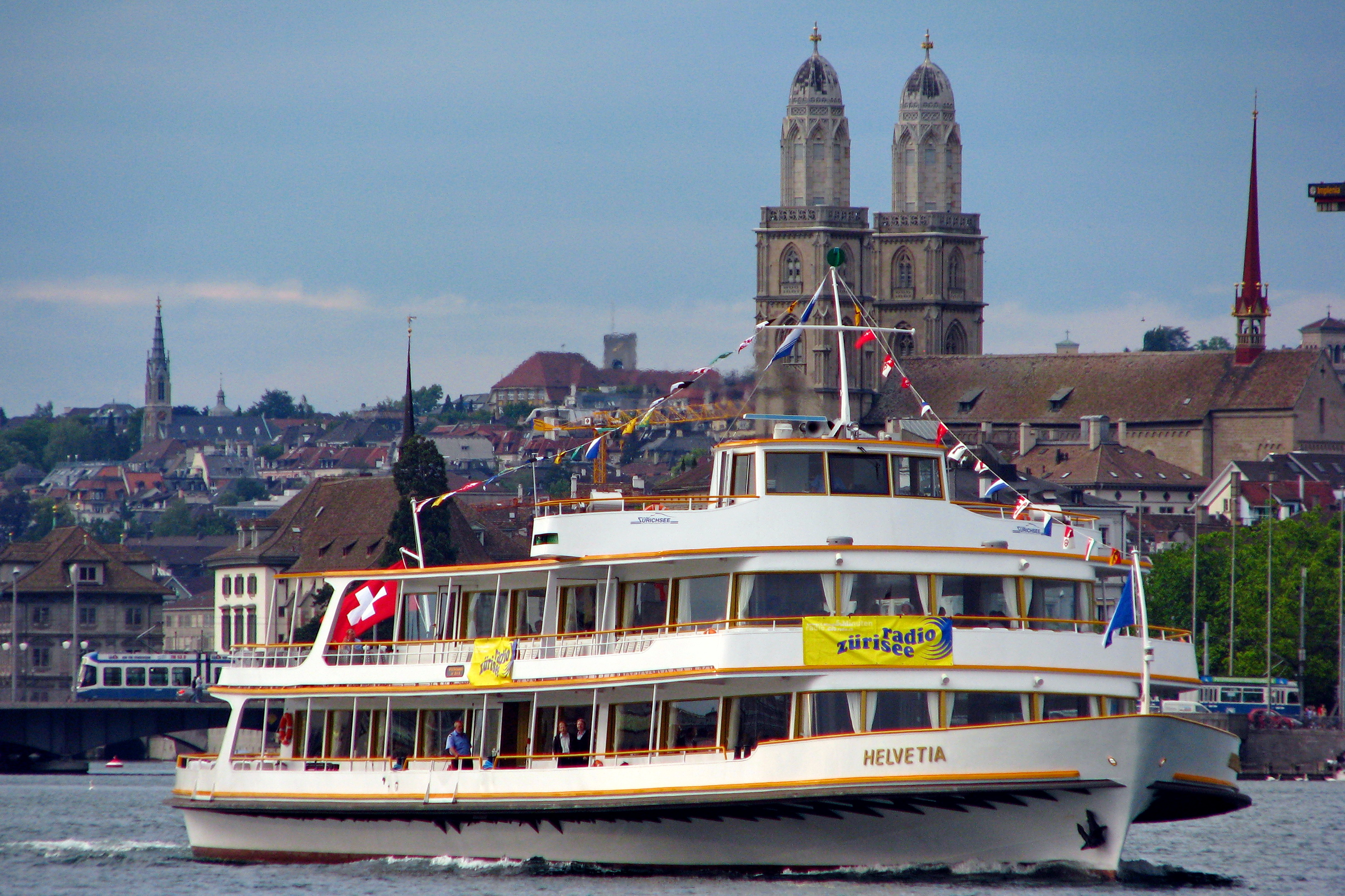
... among many other locations, Zürichsee-Schifffahrtsgesellschaft (ZSG) ship Helvetia on Zürichsee at Zürich

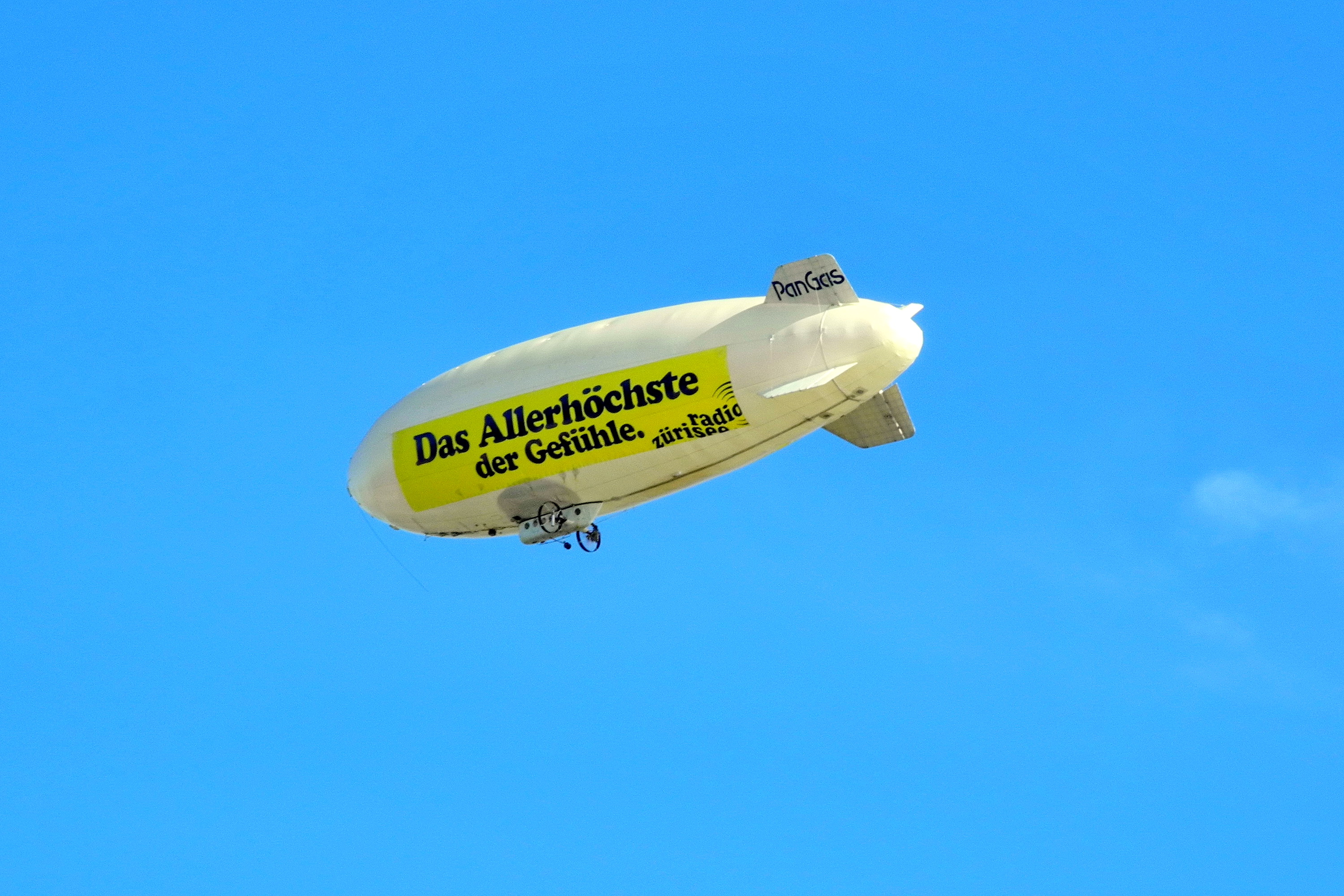
'on air' in Rapperswil

== See also ==
- Obersee Nachrichten
- Zürichsee-Zeitung
