= Adliswil-Felsenegg cable car =

Cable car in Zurich, Switzerland

Coordinates: 47°18′47.40″N 8°31′12.12″E

Adliswil-Felsenegg cable car Luftseilbahn Adliswil-Felsenegg Felseneggbahn
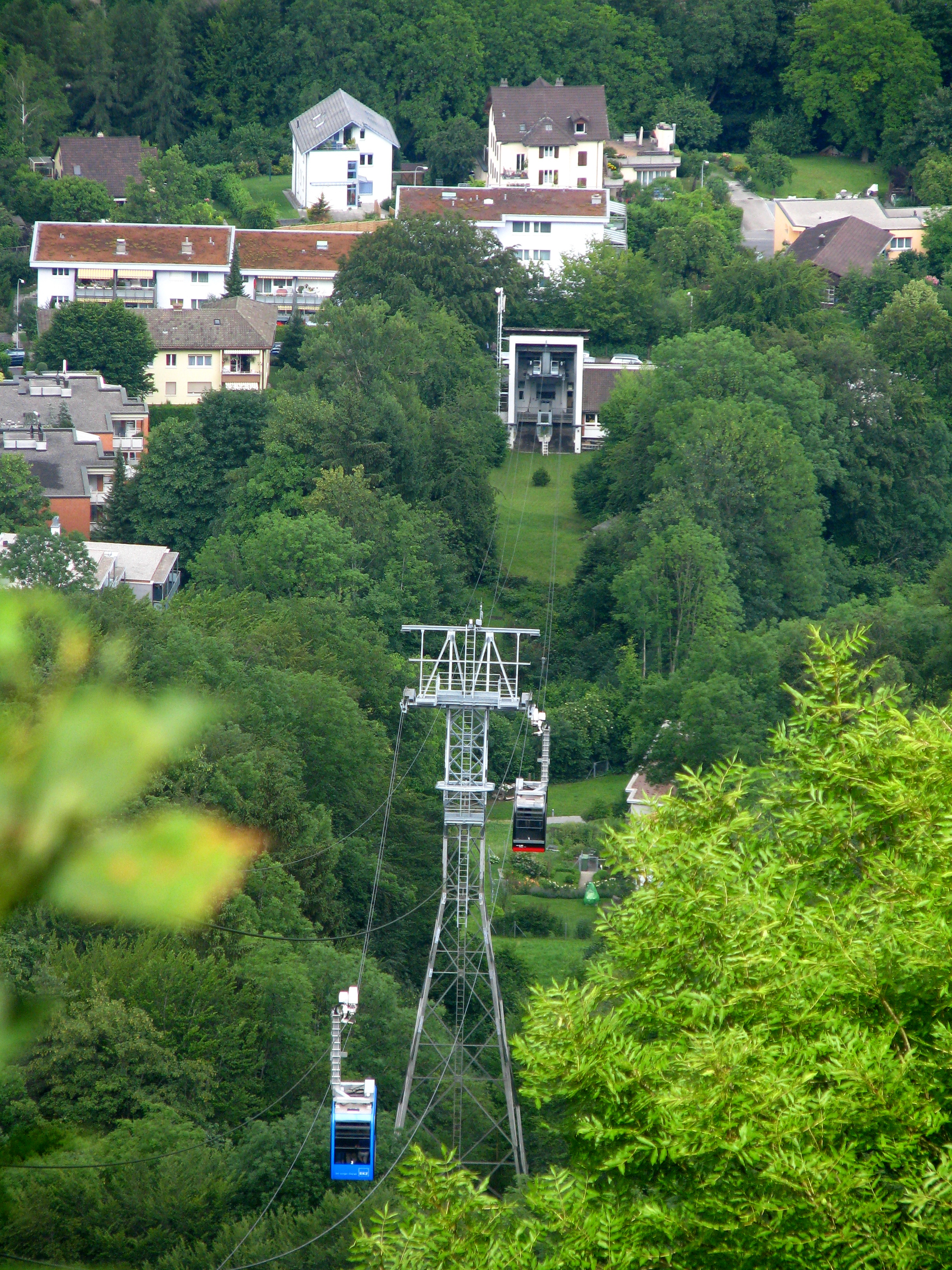

Overview
- Status: Operational
- Character: Elevated
- System: ZVV
- Location: Adliswil, canton of Zürich
- Country: Switzerland
- Termini: Adliswil; Felsenegg
- Elevation: lowest: 497 m (1,631 ft) highest: 804 m (2,638 ft)
- No. of stations: 2
- Open: 1954
- Reopened: 1 May 2008
- Website: www.szu.ch/de/ueber-die-szu/felseneggbahn/

Operation
- Owner: LAF (Luftseilbahn Adliswil-Felsenegg LAF AG)
- Operator: SZU (Sihltal Zürich Uetliberg Bahn SZU AG)
- No. of carriers: 2
- Carrier capacity: 30 + 1
- Ridership: 345 p/h per direction (2015: 253,182 ppa)
- Operating times: 08:00 or 09:00 to 20:00 or 22:00, depending on time of year and day of week
- Trips daily: at least every 15 minutes
- Trip duration: 5-6 minutes
- Fare: 2 zones (ZVV zones: 150, 155)

Technical features
- Aerial lift type: Aerial tramway
- Manufactured by: Von Roll/CWA Constructions
- Line length: 1,048 m (3,438 ft); 492 and 552 m (1,614 and 1,811 ft)
- No. of support towers: 1, 44 m (144 ft)
- No. of cables: 2
- Cable diameter: propulsion 22 mm (0.87 in), suspension 39 mm (1.5 in)
- Installed power: DC engine, 100 kW (max 185 kW)
- Operating speed: 6 m/s (20 ft/s) (21.6 km/h (13.4 mph))
- Notes: Maximum height from the ground: 60 m (197 ft)

The Adliswil-Felsenegg cable car (LAF; German: Luftseilbahn Adliswil-Felsenegg or Felseneggbahn) is a cable car in the canton of Zürich in Switzerland. The lower station is located in Adliswil in the Sihl Valley, whilst the upper station is located on the Felsenegg hill on the Albis ridge near the Felsenegg-Girstel TV-tower. The upper station at Felsenegg forms one end of a panoramic walk to the Uetliberg mountain, whilst the lower station is some 400 metres (1,300 ft) from Adliswil railway station.

The cable car is owned by the Luftseilbahn Adliswil-Felsenegg AG and is operated by the Sihltal Zürich Uetliberg Bahn (SZU), the railway company which links both Adliswil and the Uetliberg to the city of Zürich.

== History ==
The cable car was built by the Swiss company Von Roll, opening on 30 December 1954. The line reused the former two cabins of the "Landi-Schwebebahn", built to connect the two sites of the Swiss National Exhibition of 1939. In 1960, these cabins were replaced by new cabins with a capacity of 30 passengers, constructed by SIG Neuhausen, and the cables were replaced. In 1977, a majority shareholding was acquired by the Swiss company Denner AG. In 1986, the line was converted to automatic operation. In 1990, the line became part of the zonal tariff structure of the Zürcher Verkehrsverbund (ZVV), and in 1994 self-service ticketing was introduced, with ticket machines at both stations. In 1997, the drive and brake systems were replaced.

The line celebrated its 50th anniversary in 2004, when a complete renewal was planned according to the conditions for the license given by the Swiss government. The renewal cost 3.5 million Swiss francs, which was financed by the municipality of Adliswil, the city of Zürich (300,000 each), the ZVV (2 million), and by public fundraising and sponsorship. The renewal included the control and monitoring system, whilst the cabins were replaced by more comfortable, spacious and "sleek" cabins constructed by CWA Constructions SA. The masts and carrying ropes were strengthened, and both the valley and mountain stations renewed. The renewal took place between 4 February and 30 April, with the line re-opening on 1 May 2008.

On 31 March 2010, the 10th million passenger used the cableway. In 2014, the regular 6-yearly revision of the line was undertaken. In 2016, the upper station was renovated.

== Operation ==
The Adliswil-Felsenegg cable car is technically an aerial tramway (German: pendelbahn), where the two cabins are suspended from a single support cable whilst being permanently attached to a second propulsion cable. The two cars shuttle between upper and lower stations, and must operate together so that when one car is at the lower station, the other will be at the upper station. The line is operated automatically, under the supervision of a single employee located at the lower station. The cabins and upper station are normally unmanned.

The lower station is located at an altitude of 497 metres (1,631 ft), whilst the upper station is at an altitude of 804 metres (2,638 ft), giving a rise of 307 metres (1,007 ft). The line is 1,048 metres (3,438 ft) long, and passes over a single intermediate tower with a height of 44 metres (144 ft), with a maximum height above ground level of 60 metres (197 ft). The span lengths between the stations and towers are 492 metres (1,614 ft) and 552 metres (1,811 ft) long and the average gradient is 34.1%. The suspension cable has a diameter of 62 millimetres (2.4 in), and the propulsion cable of 39 millimetres (1.5 in). The propulsion cable is driven by an electric motor with a continuous power rating of 100 kilowatts (130 hp) and a peak rating of 185 kilowatts (248 hp); a backup drive of 64 kilowatts (86 hp) is also available.

The two cars each have a capacity of 30 passengers, and travel at a maximum speed of 6 metres per second (19.7 ft/s), giving a journey time of 5 to 6 minutes and a maximum hourly capacity of 345 passengers in each direction. The car runs every 15 minutes, or more often if traffic requires it. Depending on the time of the year and the day of the week, cars run from either 08:00 or 09:00 to either 20:00 or 22:00.

== Connections ==
The valley station is in short walking distance (ca. 400 m (1,300 ft)) to Adliswil railway station, served by the S4 service of Zürich S-Bahn and busses. The top station (Felsenegg) lies on a panoramic hiking route. Towards north, the ca. 6 km (3.7 mi) long hiking path leads to Uetliberg railway station, served by S10 service.

== Gallery ==
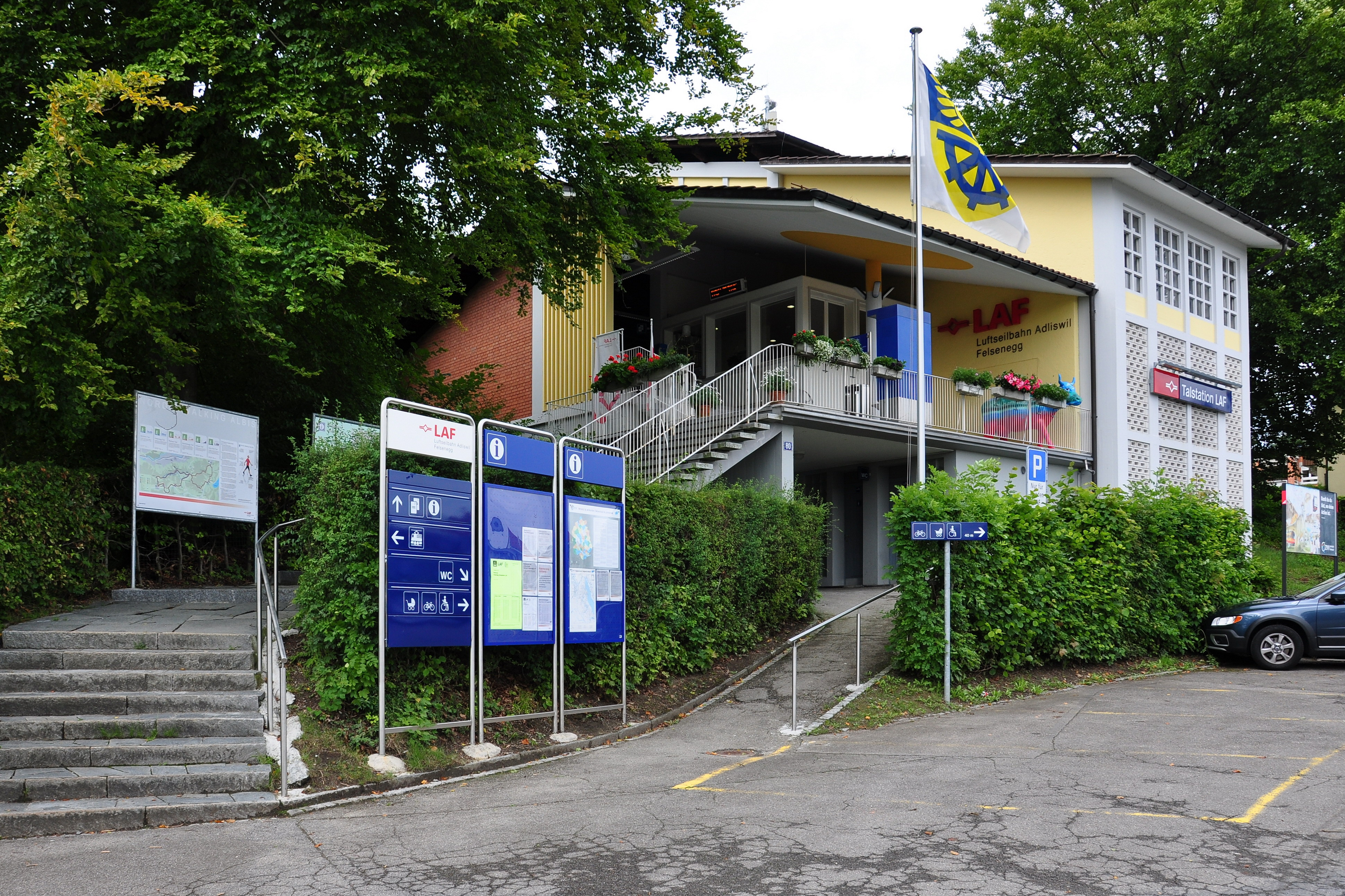
Base station in Adliswil

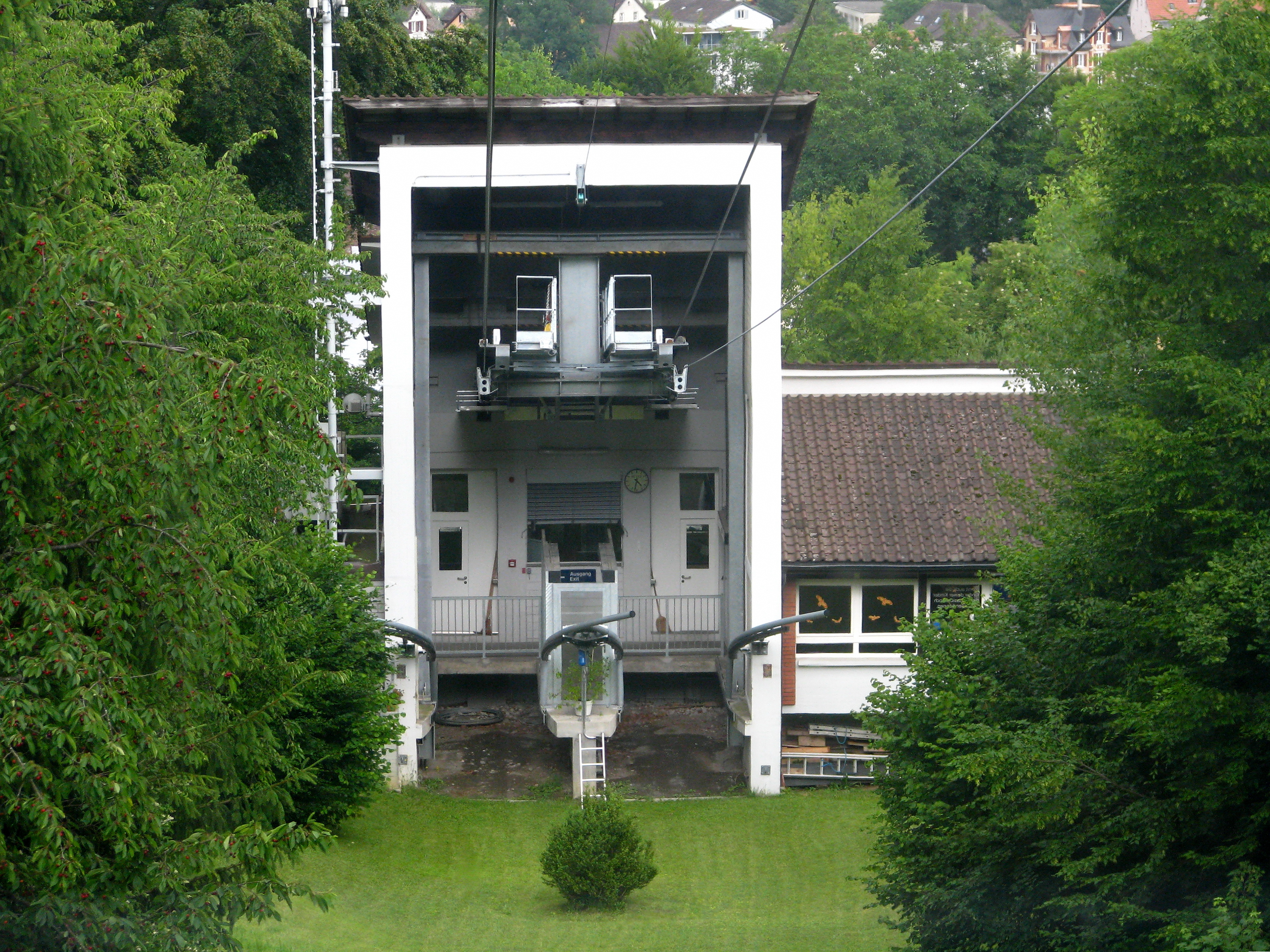
Base station as seen from the cabin

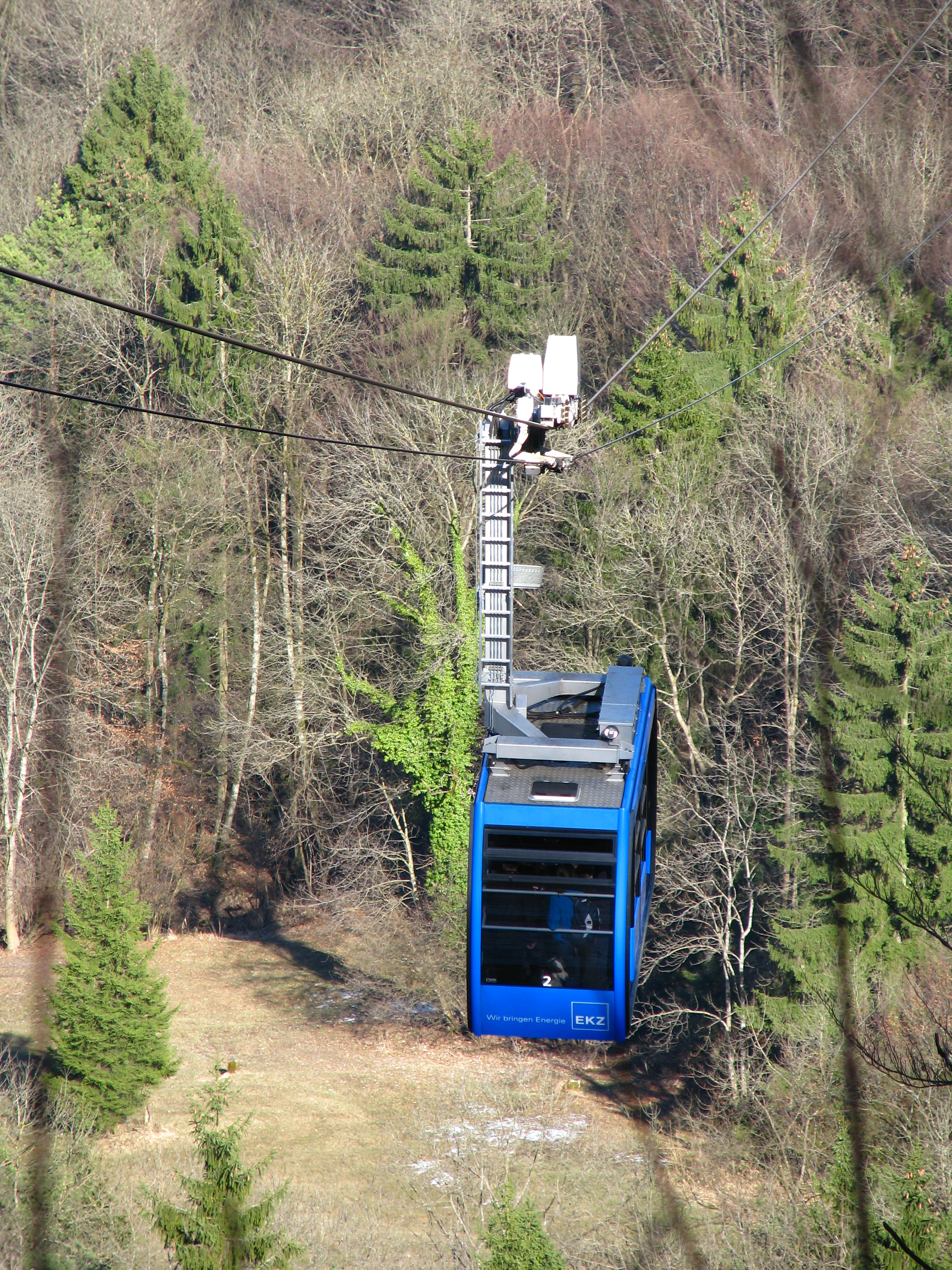
One of the two cabins

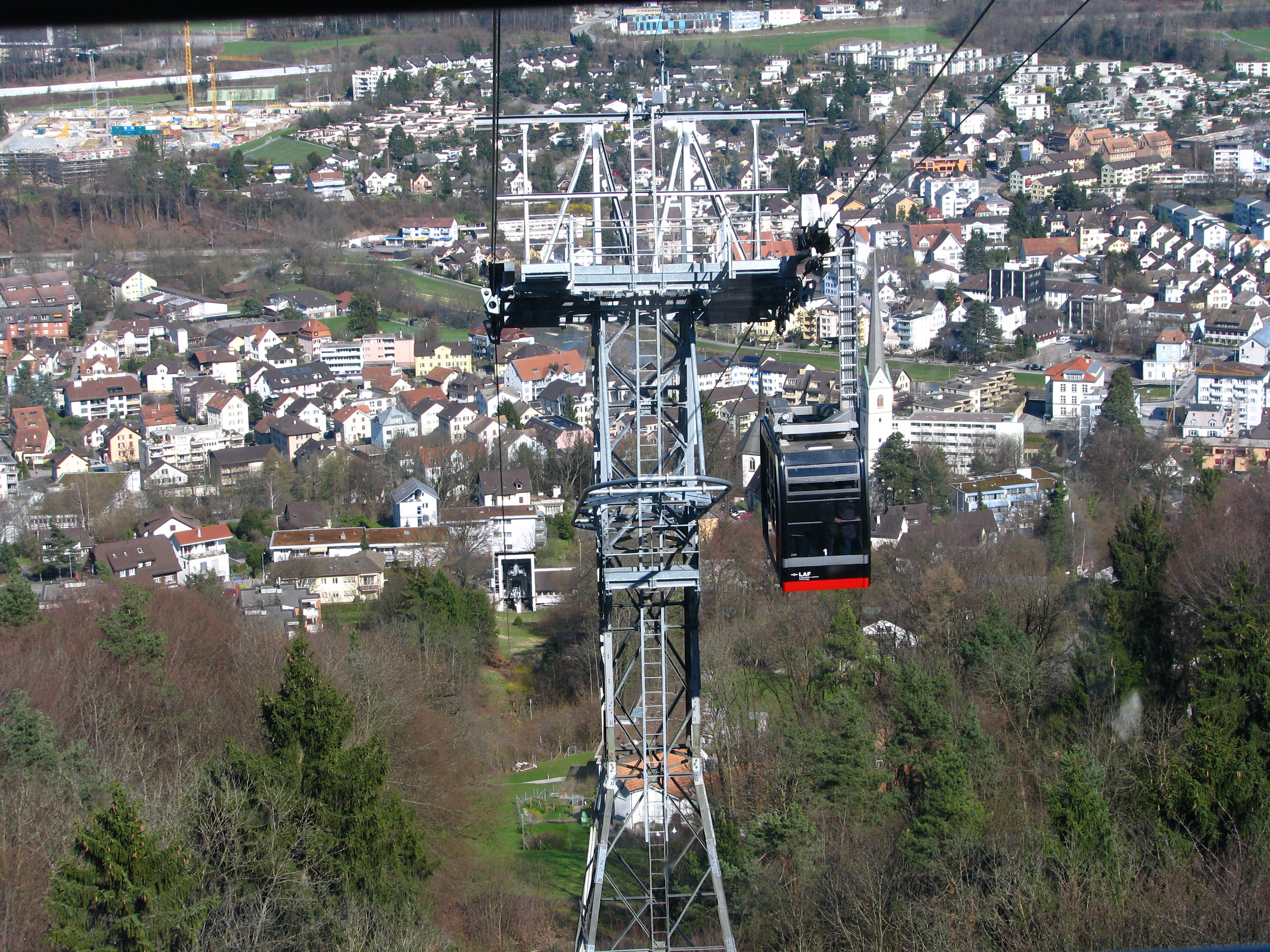
Support tower

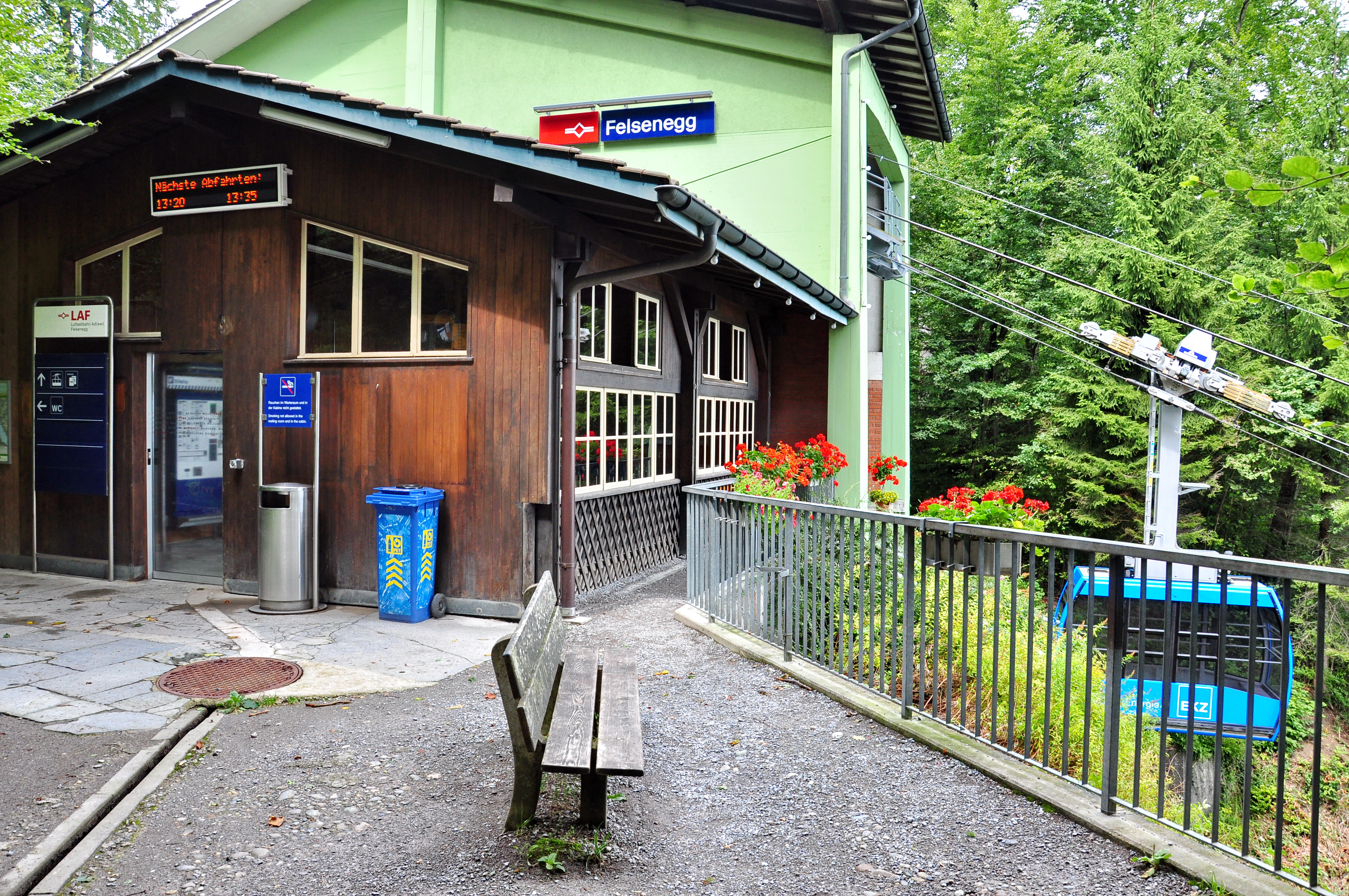
Top station Felsenegg

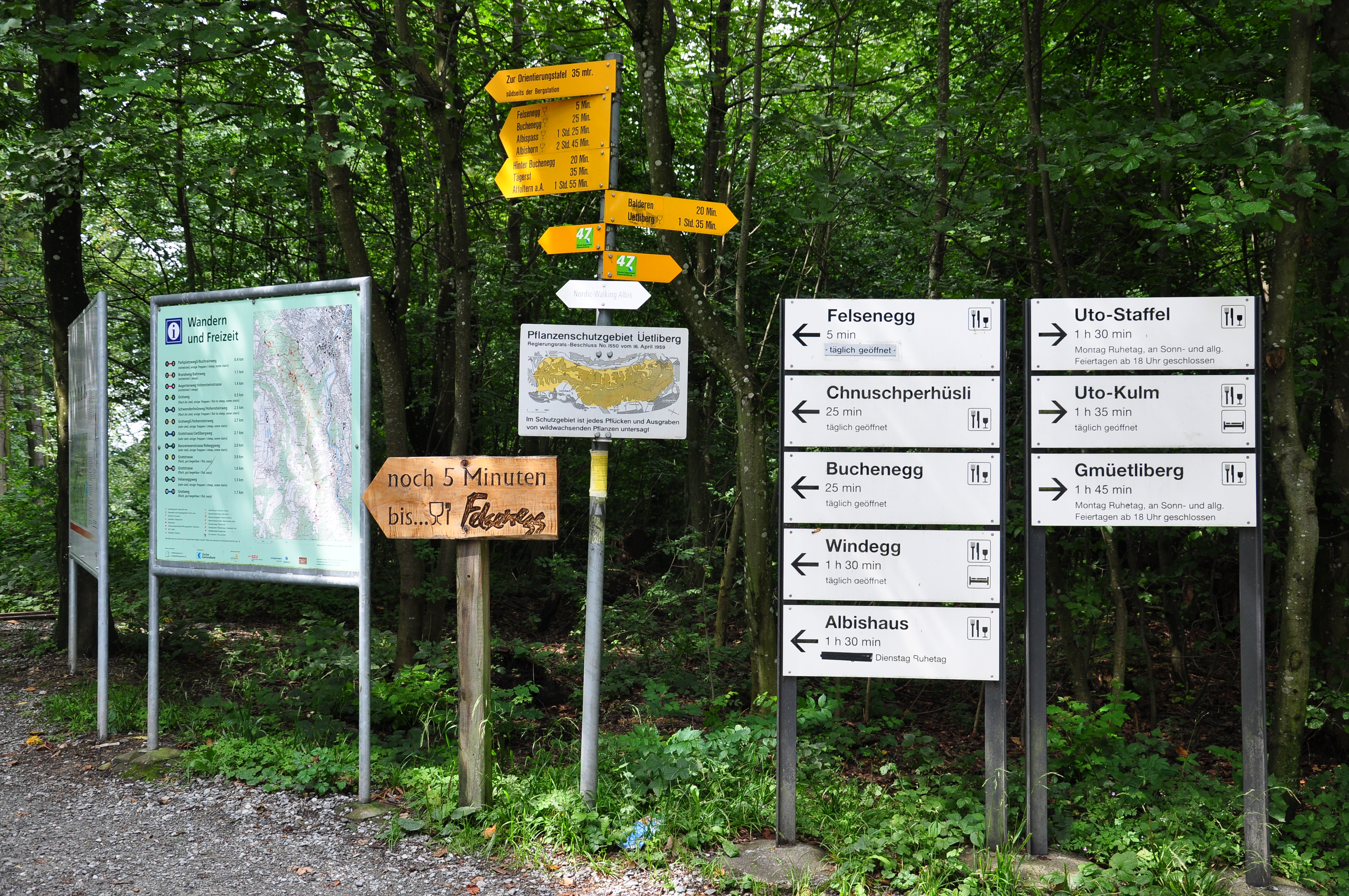
Hiking signs at the top station
