= Obersee Nachrichten =

Swiss German-language weekly newspaper

- Type: Weekly newspaper
- Owner: Zürcher Regionalzeitungen AG
- Founder: Bruno Hug
- Publisher: Mediengruppe Südostschweiz AG
- Editor-in-chief: Bruno Hug
- Editor: Philipp Fanchini, Michel Wassner, Anna Kohler, Michèle Fasler, Mario Aldrovandi
- Staff writers: more than 12
- Founded: 20 June 1981
- Language: German
- City: Rapperswil
- Country: Switzerland
- Circulation: 68,822
- Website: obersee-nachrichten.ch (in German)

Obersee Nachrichten (Swiss Standard German pronunciation: [ˈoːbərzeː ˈnaːxrɪçtn̩], lit. 'Upper Lake News'), commonly shortened to ON, was a Swiss German-language weekly newspaper, published in Rapperswil.

== History and profile ==
Obersee Nachrichten was founded by the publisher Bruno Hug. The first issue was published on 20 June 1981. By the end of 1999, Obersee Nachrichten AG was sold to the Mediengruppe West Schweiz AG, headquartered in Chur. The staff comprised 12 employees in five (500%) full-time jobs, as well as employees comprising the newspaper prepress (Südostschweiz, Glarus) and the print shop (Südostschweiz Partner AG, Haag). The newspaper was still run by Bruno Hug as the publisher. The publishing company was based in Rapperswil.

Obersee Nachrichten (literally: Upper Lake Zürich Newspaper) claimed to be the "largest and most widely read newspaper in the greater region of the Obersee lake shore." The newspaper was distributed between Rapperswil-Jona (canton of St. Gallen), Rüti ZH towards the Ricken Pass, and between Wollerau (canton of Schwyz) and Glarnerland. The newspaper was published every Thursday, 52 times a year, reaching a circulation of 68,822 (WEMF-authenticated) and 82,000 regular readers (MACH-based). There is free distribution to all households in the distribution area. The last issue of ON was published on 21 August 2025.

== See also ==
- Zürichsee-Zeitung
