= Uetliberg TV Tower =

Tower in Zurich, Switzerland

Coordinates: 47°21′4″N 8°29′25″E

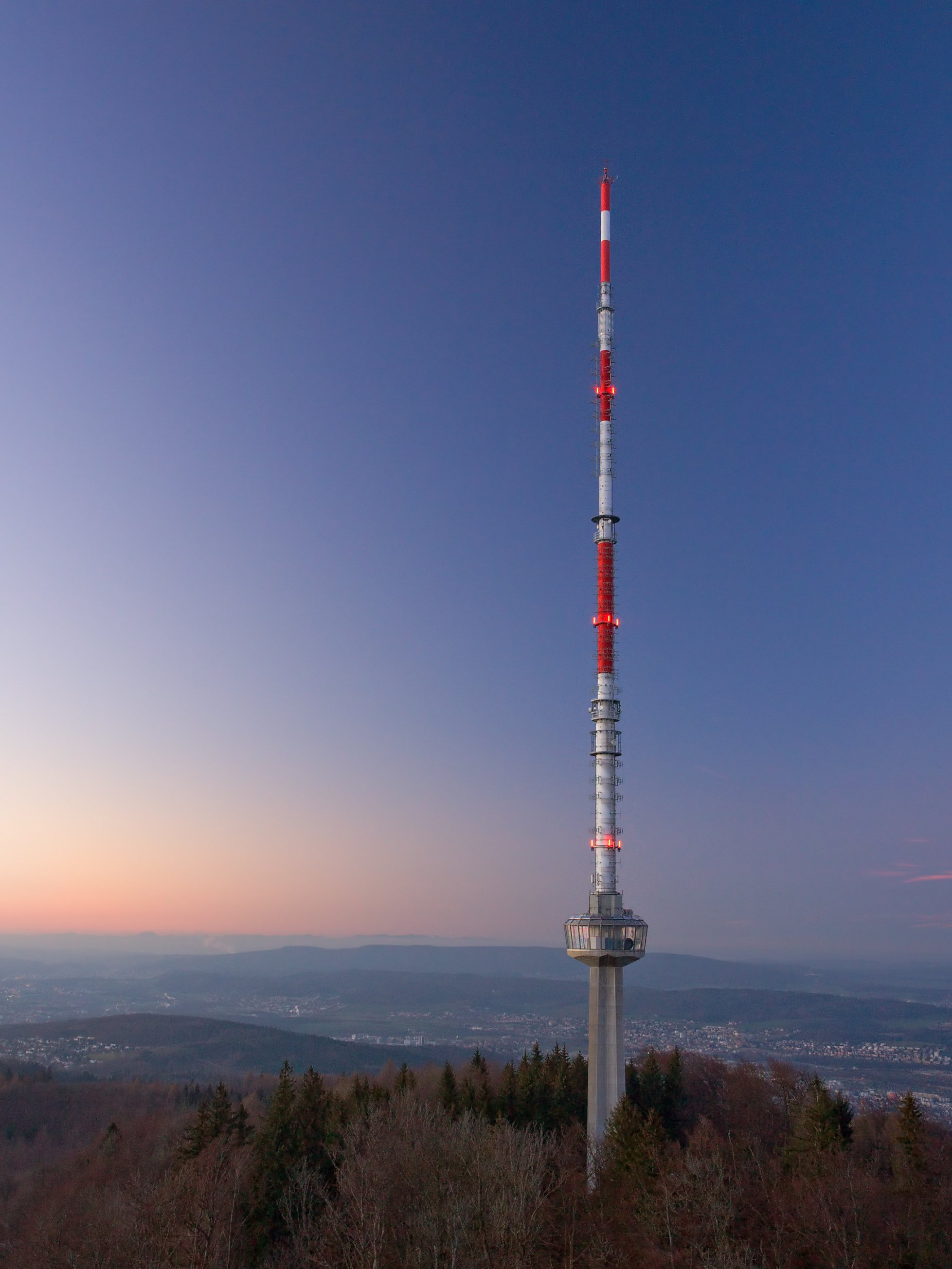
Uetliberg TV Tower at sunset, as seen from south-east

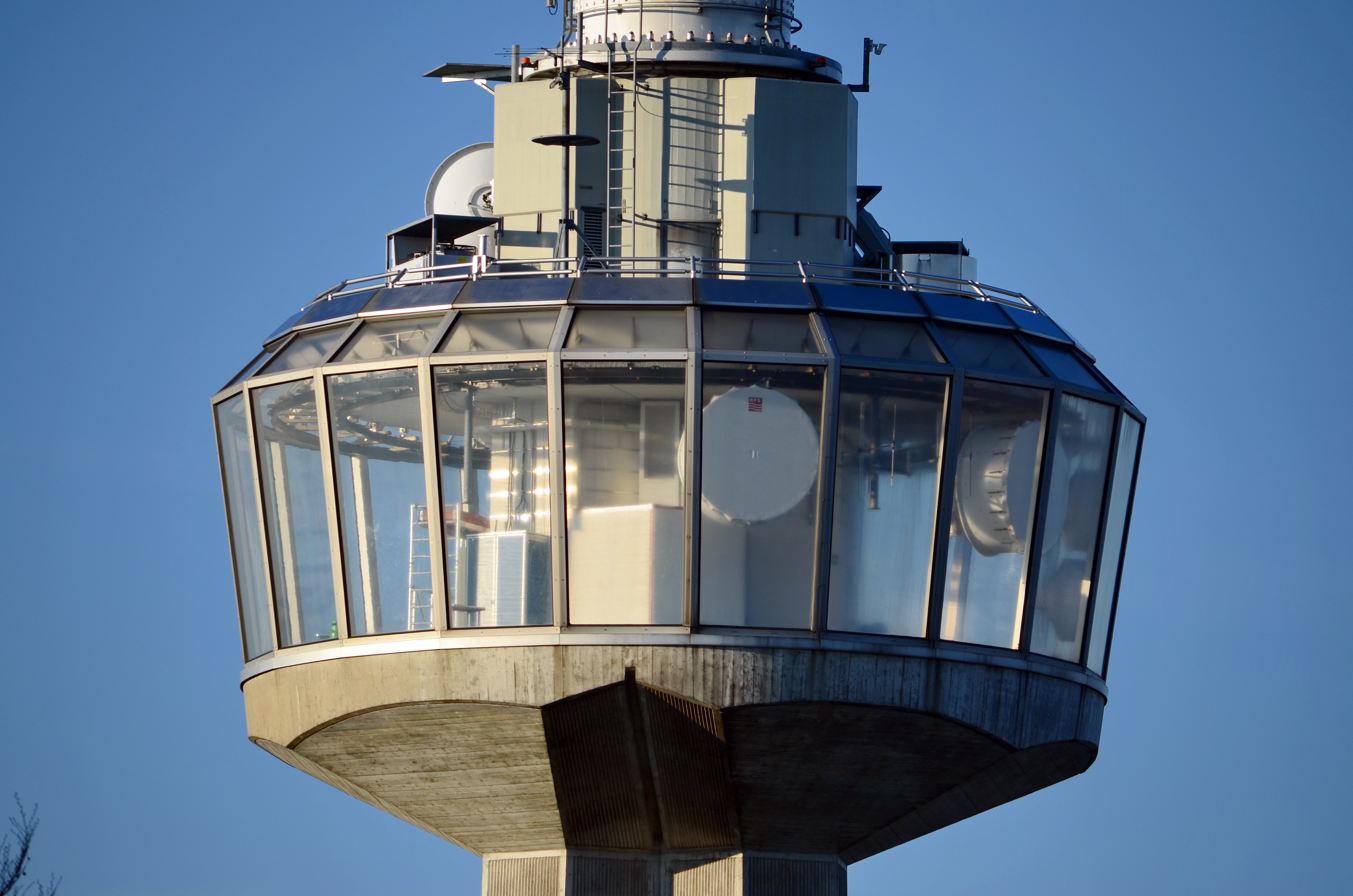
Close-up of the observation deck

Uetliberg TV Tower is a 186.7-metre-high (613 ft) freestanding concrete TV tower on Uetliberg, near Zürich, Switzerland, built in 1990. The tower is used for radio and TV transmission. It is owned by Swisscom and generally not accessible to the public.

== Services ==
Since its construction, the tower has been a primary transmission site for FM radio and digital television (DVB-T2) in the Greater Zürich area.

For decades, the tower has been a vital resource for hikers and tourists via its high-definition 360-degree webcam, which allowed for real-time monitoring of weather conditions and the "fog line" over the Limmat Valley. While many Swisscom-operated mountain webcams were deactivated in early 2026 due to the 3G network shutdown, the Uetliberg camera—historically managed by the neighboring Uto Kulm hotel—remained a subject of public interest regarding its technical future and data privacy compliance.
