= St. Galler Tagblatt =

Swiss daily newspaper

- Type: Daily newspaper
- Owner: St. Galler Tagblatt AG
- Founded: • 1789 (as Tagblatt der Stadt St. Gallen) • 1910 (name changed to St. Galler Tagblatt)
- Language: German
- Headquarters: St. Gallen
- Country: Switzerland
- Circulation: 101,732 (as of 2007)
- ISSN: 1424-2869
- OCLC number: 314925644
- Website: www.tagblatt.ch

St. Galler Tagblatt, commonly shortened to Tagblatt, is a Swiss German-language daily newspaper, published in St. Gallen.

== History and profile ==
The newspaper was first published in 1789 as Tagblatt der Stadt St. Gallen. Its current name dates from 1910. The paper is part of St. Galler Tagblatt AG of which 70% is owned by NZZ Mediengruppe, parent company of Neue Zürcher Zeitung.

St. Galler Tagblatt described itself as "bourgeois-liberal" with a tendency towards liberal democrats until the 1990s.

In 1997, St. Galler Tagblatt had a circulation of 119,391 copies. The paper had a circulation of 110,000 copies in 2003. The 2006 circulation of the paper was 103,077 copies. In 2007, the newspaper had a circulation of 101,732.
