= Zürichsee-Zeitung =

Swiss German-language daily newspaper

- Type: Daily newspaper
- Owner: Zürcher Regionalzeitungen AG
- Publisher: Zürichsee Presse AG
- Editor: Benjamin Geiger
- Founded: 1845 as Wochenblatt from Zürichsee; 1868 as Anzeiger des Bezirks Meilen
- Language: German
- Headquarters: Stäfa
- Country: Switzerland
- Circulation: 31,032 (as of November 2013)
- Website: www.zsz.ch

Zürichsee-Zeitung, commonly shortened to ZSZ, is a Swiss German-language daily newspaper, published in Stäfa.

== History and profile ==
In 1845 the precursing "Wochenblatt vom Zürichsee" was founded as a liberal newspaper by the Lesegesellschaft Stäfa (literally: Reading Society Stäfa), and was taken over by Rudolf Gull in 1857. From 1881 to 1920 Gull's son Emil junior was the editor in chief; he renamed the weekly newspaper in 1907 as Zürichsee-Zeitung and made it a daily newspaper in 1914. Gull's successor Theodor Gut took over the newspaper in 1933, and was the publisher of the newspaper emphasized now a liberal orientation. His son of the same name, editor in chief from 1953 to 1987, initiated the transition to a non-partisan forum newspaper, and the company expanded in 1983 to get involved in Radio Zürisee. After the acquisition of several local newspapers, the newspaper appeared in 1997 with three regional editions and reached a dominant position in the districts of Meilen and Horgen. In 2010 Zürichsee-Zeitungwas integrated into the Tamedia group, which it incorporated into the composite of Zürich regional newspapers in 2011. In 1972 Zürichsee-Zeitung had a circulation of 18,207 copies. It was 53,469 copies in 1998 and 36,226 copies in 2012. In 2013 the circulation of the paper was 31,032 copies.

There are, as of December 2014, three regional distributions: Zürichsee-Zeitung Bezirk Meilen, Zürichsee-Zeitung Bezirk Horgen and Zürichsee-Zeitung Obersee (See-Gaster), the former Linth-Zeitung newspaper in the canton of St. Gallen. The issues differ substantially by their different regional coverage. Articles about issues outside the Zürichsee region are managed by the editorial team of the Der Landbote newspaper in Winterthur. The redaction compromises 50 editors and correspondents and some more freelance employees at three locations.

== See also ==
- Der Landbote
- Obersee Nachrichten
- Radio Zürisee
