= Stehli =

Stehli is a surname. Notable people with the surname include:

- Edgar Stehli (1884–1973), American actor
- Jemima Stehli (born 1961), British artist
- Robert Stehli (1930–2018), Swiss conductor

Notable families with the surname Stehli:

- Stehli family

Other usages

- Stehli Silks

== See also ==
- Stehlin
