= List of power stations in Switzerland =

The following page lists power stations in Switzerland. For traction current see List of installations for 15 kV AC railway electrification in Germany, Austria and Switzerland.

== Hydroelectric ==
There are 556 hydroelectric power plants in Switzerland that have a capacity of at least 300 kW. Some of these are listed below:

Station	Capacity (MW)	Location	Geographic coordinates	Status
Aue Power Station	3.9	Baden	47°28′13″N 8°18′40″E	Operational
Bieudron Hydroelectric Power Station	1,269	Bieudron	46°11′07″N 7°14′58″E	Operational
Chandoline Power Station	120			Operational
Dietikon Power Station	2.6	Dietikon	47°24′36″N 8°24′30″E	Operational
Etzelwerk Power Station	140	Altendorf	47°11′40″N 8°48′40″E	Operational
Fionnay Power Station	290			Operational
Gletsch Small Hydro		Gletsch	46°33′49″N 8°21′45″E	Historic
Grimsel 1 Hydroelectric Power Station	1,450	Guttannen	46°34′20″N 8°19′47″E	Operational
Grimsel 2 Hydroelectric Power Station (pumped-storage hydroelectric power station)	350	Guttannen	46°34′23″N 8°20′16″E?	Operational
Höngg Power Station	1	Zurich	47°24′07″N 8°29′13″E	Operational
Kappelerhof Power Station	6.8	Baden	47°29′04″N 8°17′35″E	Operational
Küblis Power Station	45	Küblis	46°54′50″N 9°46′55″E	Operational
La Bâtiaz Power Station (Emosson Dam)	162	Martigny	46°04′03″N 6°55′56″E	Operational
Letten Power Station	4	Zurich	47°23′15″N 8°31′56″E	Operational
Linth–Limmern Power Stations	1,480	Linthal	46°51′00″N 9°0′03″E	Operational
Mauvoisin Dam Power Stations	363	Bagnes	45°59′53″N 7°20′55″E	Operational
Mubisa power station	26	Ernen		Operational
Nant de Drance	900	Finhaut	46°03′49″N 6°54′40″E	Operational
Nendaz Power Station	390			Operational
Ottenbach Small Hydro		Ottenbach	47°16′47″N 8°23′51″E	Historic as of 1920
Robbia Power Station	27	Poschiavo	46°20′54″N 10°3′41″E	Operational
Schiffmühle Power Station	2.6	Untersiggenthal	47°29′19″N 8°15′54″E	Operational
Thorenberg Power Station	0.75	Littau	47°03′10″N 8°14′53″E	Operational since May 1886, second in the world
Turgi Power Station	1	Turgi		Operational
Verzasca Hydroelectric Power Station	105	Tenero-Contra	46°11′48″N 8°50′53″E	Operational
Wettingen Power Station	26	Wettingen	47°27′24″N 8°19′14″E	Operational
Wysswasser Power Station	3.1	Fiesch	46°23′48″N 8°08′07″E	Operational

== Nuclear ==
Name	Capacity (MW_{e})	Location	Geographic coordinates	Type	Operational	Notes
Beznau Nuclear Power Plant, reactor I	365	Döttingen	47°33′09″N 8°13′43″E	PWR	1969–	
Beznau II	365	Döttingen	47°33′06″N 8°13′42″E	PWR	1971–	
Mühleberg Nuclear Power Plant	355	Muehleberg	46°58′08″N 7°16′05″E	BWR	1972–2019	
Gösgen Nuclear Power Plant	970	Däniken	47°21′58″N 7°58′00″E	PWR	1979–	
Leibstadt Nuclear Power Plant	1165	Leibstadt	47°36′06″N 8°10′57″E	BWR	1984–	

== Thermal ==
Name	Capacity (MW)	Location	Geographic coordinates	Type and fuel	Operational
Monthey	55	Monthey	-	combined cycle	2009
Tridel	17	Lausanne	-	waste	-
Giubiasco	16	Giubiasco	-	waste	-

A gas turbine testing facility in Birr AG, belonging to Ansaldo Energia, sometimes feeds up to 740 megawatts into the Swiss electricity grid.

== See also ==
- List of power stations in Europe
- List of largest power stations in the world
- List of wind farms in Switzerland
