= Stehli family =

Stehli
- Political family and Business family
- Coat of arms published in the History of Obfelden, 1947
- Current region: Switzerland; United States
- Origin: Obfelden, Zürich, Switzerland
- Founded: Municipal citizenship 1490, Zürich; 536 years ago
- Founder: Hensli Stehli (1416)
- Titles: Cantonal Councilor of Zürich; National Councilor of Switzerland; District governor; Constitutional Councilor
- Connected families: Pestalozzi family Koechlin family Schwarzenbach family

The Stehli family is a Swiss industrial and political family that has been prominent in silk manufacturing and politics since the early 19th century. In 1897, the family built one of the largest textile concerns in the world, primarily active in the United States, more specifically in Lancaster, Pennsylvania. The concern was known as Stehli Silk Corporation. A daughter of Emil Stehli-Hirt (1868–1945), Margaretha Emerentia Frölicher-Stehli, has been a first class passenger and survivor of the Titanic.

== History ==
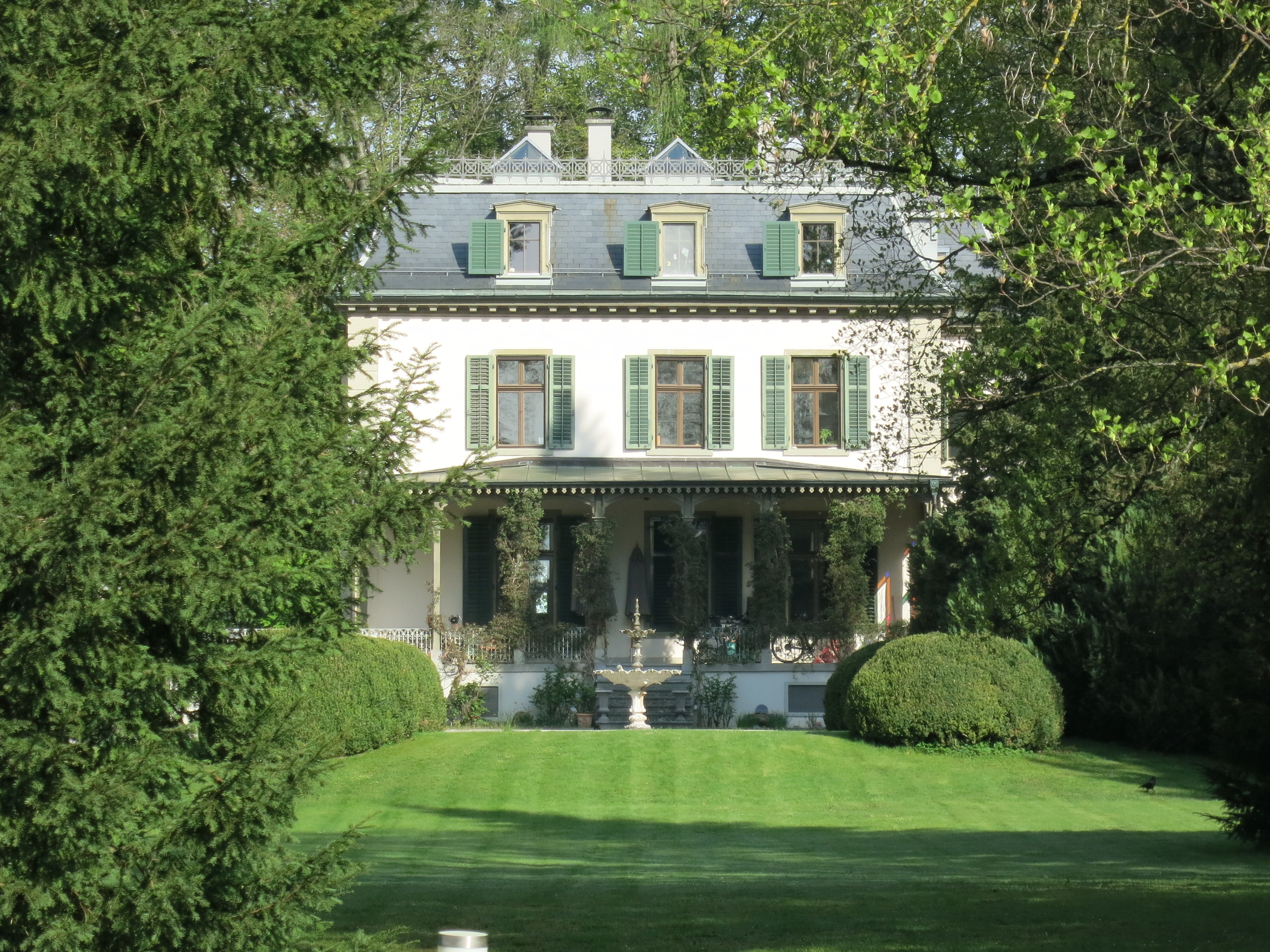
Stehli Park in Obfelden, Switzerland (built in 1875/76)

The Stehli family is first referred in records of 1321 in Rifferswil. The founding father of the family in Obfelden was Hensli Stehli (1416). The Stehli family received municipal citizenship of Zürich in 1490.

The modern Stehli dynasty originally hails from Ottenbach where Rudolf Stehli-Hausheer (1816-1884) laid the foundation for the textile concern Stehli Silks. In 1837/38 he began to manufacture cotton and in fully switched to silk in 1840.

After the dissolution of the manufacturing business during the textile downturn of the 1970s a lot of the historical archive materials were lost. Most recently under the history research project Silk History since 1800 led by historian Alexis Schwarzenbach, the remains of the company archive was put in the State Archive of Zurich for historic preservation.

== Members ==
=== Ancestors ===
- Rudolf Stehli (1816-1884), (m. 1836) Emerentia Hausheer (two sons)
  - Emil Stehli (1842-1913), (m.) Margaretha Hirt
    - Margareta Emerentia Stehli (1864-1955) (m. 1884) Maximilian J. Frölicher
    - Rudolf "Robert" Stehli (1865–1951) (m.) Elisabeth "Emy" Zweifel (1873–1949)
    - Julie Stehli (1866-?) (m. 1892) Hans Caspar Rudolph Schulthess
    - Emil Jacob Stehli (1868-1945) (m. 1897) Marguerite Jennet Zweifel
    - Maria Mathilde Stehli (1869-1950) (m. 1892) Walter Carl Frölicher

=== Descendants of Margareta Emerentia Frölicher-Stehli ===
- Max Frölicher, Jr. (1886-1943) (m. ?) Jenny Köchlin (1898-?)
- Hans Frölicher (1887-1961) (m. ?) Rosa Müller
- Hedwig Marguerite Frölicher (1889-1972) (m. 1913) Robert John Frederick Schwarzenbach (Schwarzenbach, Huber & Co)
  - Anne Liselotte Schwarzenbach (1913-)
  - Robert M. Schwarzenbach (1917-1988)
  - Jean Christopher Schwarzenbach (1918-2017)
- Otto Frölicher (1891-1961) (m. 1918) Gertrud Escher
  - Peter Frölicher (1919-1943)
  - Marguerite Thérèse Frölicher
- William Stehli Frölicher (1894-1964)

=== Descendants of Robert Stehli-Zweifel ===
- Rudolf Robert Stehli, colloquially Robert Stehli (1865–1951) (m. 1897) Elisabeth "Emy" Zweifel (1873–1949)
  - Marguerite "Margi" Stehli (died 1987) (m.) Dr. Conrad Werner "Cony" Staehelin (1888–1959), who was one of the founders of renowned law firm Lenz & Staehelin.
    - Willy Staehelin (m.) Marina Peyer
    - Alfred "Fredy" Staehelin (m.) Elisabeth Bosshard
    - Ruth Staehelin
    - Konrad Staehelin (m.) Regina Gessler
  - Ida Helena Stehli (1896–1970) (m. 1921) Viktor Froelicher
  - Robert Heinrich Stehli (1898–1973) (m.) Magdalena Anna Pestalozzi (1906–1982)
    - Robert Stehli (1930–2018) (m. 1st) Marlene Isenbart (m. 2nd) Iro Dellas
      - Ulrike Stehli
      - Christian Stehli
      - Mark Stehli
    - Henriette Stehli (born 1932) (m.) Maurice Tatinclaux
      - Anne-Christine Tatinclaux
      - Patricia Tatinclaux
      - Henri Tatinclaux
    - Hans Ulrich Stehli (born 1934)
  - Alfred Emil "Freddy" Stehli (1902–1988) (m. 1942) Susanne "Susi" Kaufmann (born 1921)
    - Beat Alfred Stehli (1945–1993) (m.) Barbara Zollikofer
      - Claudia Stehli (r.) Jair Sàenz
      - Bettina Stehli
      - Julia Stehli (r.) Sohrab Kehtari
      - David Stehli (r.) Laura Inderbitzi
    - Martin Stehli (born 1946) (m.) Helen Vogt
      - Konstantin Heinrich Stehli
      - Alfred-Frédéric Robert Stehli
      - Henry Stehli
    - Christine Stehli (born 1948)
    - Suzanne Stehli (born 1951)

=== Descendants of Julie Schulthess-Stehli ===
- Marguerite Schulthess (b. 1893)
- Rudolf Schulthess (b. 1897)
- Anna Maria Schulthess (b. 1900)

=== Descendants of Emil Stehli-Zweifel ===
- Lilly Marguerite Stehli (1898-1962) (m. 1917) Paul Hyde Bonner
  - Paul Hyde Bonner, Jr. (1918-1989)
  - John Tyler Bonner
  - Henry Stehli Bonner (1923-2014)
- Henry Emil Stehli (1902-1955) (m.) Grace H.
  - Margaret Stehli Kelly (1931-2023) (m.) Charles J. "Chuck" Kelly
- Peter Henry Stehli (1933-2011) (m.) Joan Phillips Thompson; three children; married secondly to Annabel Stearns Manley; two children;
  - Pamela Hayes Stehli Hearne (b. 1957)
  - Katharine Thompson Stehli Scharf (b. 1959)
  - Henry Huntington Stehli (b. 1961)
  - Mark Wilson Stehli (b. 1975) Erin Oates Stehli
  - Sarah Stehli Howell (b. 1979) Lucius Howell

=== Descendants of Maria Mathilde Frölicher-Stehli ===
- Mathilde Frölicher (1893-) (m. 1918) Willy Schnyder
  - Rudolf Schnyder (b. 1919)
  - Willy Schnyder, Jr. (1921-1964) (m.) Elisabeth von Blarer (b. 1914)
  - Madeleine Schnyder (b.1922)
  - Jakob Schnyder (b. 1929)
- Gertrud Frölicher (1894-1968) (m.) Charles de Sury (1884-1974)
  - Gaston de Sury (1918-1948)
  - Hans de Sury (1920-1922)
- Walter Frölicher (1896-1959) (m.) Martha Lack (b. 1904)
  - Walter Frölicher, Jr. (1926-1927)
  - Gertrud Frölicher (1928-1930)
- Hedwig Frölicher (b. 1897 (m.) Paul Burkard
- Jean Frölicher (1898-1968) (m.) Dorothée Sieber (b. 1906)
- Anna Thérèse Fröicher (1898-1995) (m.) Wilhelm Robert Meyer (1892-1987)
  - Robert Frederick Meyer (1925-2013) (m.) Mary Joan Young (1925-2011)
    - Bruce Robert Meyer (1959-2005)
- Ernst Louis Frölicher (1906-1958) (m.) Margaret van Wylick

== Literature ==
- Die Familie Stehli-Hirt von Obfelden, 1948
