= Paul Hyde Bonner =

American banker, soldier, singer, diplomat and author

- Born: February 14, 1893; New York City, U.S.
- Died: December 14, 1968 (aged 75); Charleston, South Carolina, U.S.
- Education: Phillips Exeter Academy; Harvard University (AB)
- Occupations: Banker, diplomat, singer, soldier and author
- Spouses: Lilly Marguerite Stehli (m. 1917; died 1962) Elizabeth McGowan (m. 1963)
- Children: 4, including John

Paul Hyde Bonner (February 14, 1893 – December 14, 1968) was an American banker, soldier, singer, diplomat, and author. He is a member of the Stehli family by marriage to Lilly Marguerite Stehli, a daughter of Emil Stehli-Zweifel, then the head of Stehli Silks Corporation in New York.

== Early life ==
Bonner was born on February 14, 1893, in Brooklyn, New York to Paul Edward and Theodora (née Hyde) Bonner. In 1911, he graduated from Phillips Exeter Academy, before graduating from Harvard University in 1915.

== Career ==
In February 1934, Bonner's collection of first editions was auctioned off by the American Art Association and Anderson Galleries on East 57th Street, New York City.

In April 1936, his feature We Live in the Country was published in Vogue. In October 1936, a "semi-fiction" article of his, Stalker & Co., was published in Esquire, illustrated by Gilbert Bundy.

Bonner did not start writing books until his late 50s. His first novel, SPQR, was published in 1952. He published two collections of stories about the outdoor life: in 1954, The Glorious Mornings, Stories of Shooting and Fishing, and in 1958, Aged in the Woods.

== Personal life ==
In 1917, Bonner married Lilly Marguerite Stehli, a daughter of Emil and Marguerite (née Zweifel) Stehli in New York City. His father-in-law was the head of Stehli Silks in the US. They had four children;

- Paul Hyde Bonner Jr. (May 12, 1918 - May 27, 1989), captain in the United States Air Force, married to Louisa B. Thorn
- John Tyler Bonner (May 12, 1920 - February 7, 2019)
- Henry Stehli Bonner (1923 - December 7, 2014)

His wife's death was reported in the New York Times on January 2, 1962.
