= Rudolf Stehli-Hausheer =

Swiss industrialist and politician (1816–1884)

Member of the National Council (Switzerland)
- In office 1 June 1867 – 5 December 1869
- Constituency: Canton of Zurich

Member of the Cantonal Council of Zurich
- In office 1843–1878

Personal details
- Born: Rudolf Stehli; 8 December 1816 Obfelden, Switzerland
- Died: 14 April 1884 (aged 67) Obfelden, Switzerland
- Spouse: Emerentia Hausheer (m. 1836)
- Children: 2
- Occupation: Industrialist, philanthropist, politician

Rudolf Stehli also referred as Rudolf Stehli-Hausheer (8 December 1816 - 14 March 1884) was a Swiss industrialist, philanthropist and politician who served on the National Council (Switzerland) from 1867 to 1869 for the Free Radical Liberals. He was previously a member of the municipal government, governing council and the Cantonal Council of Zurich between 1843 and 1878. Stehli was the founder of Stehli Silks and the patriarch of the Stehli family.

== Literature ==
- Hans Rudolf Schmid; Wilhelm Sulser; Fritz Rieter: Band 2 Schweizer Pioniere der Wirtschaft und Technik; 1955 (in German)
