= List of wind farms in Switzerland =

In Switzerland as of 2026, there were at least 14 wind farms in operation with at least 50 turbines.

== Wind farms in operation ==
Only wind farms or turbines with a rated capacity of over 1 megawatt are included in this list.

Selected Swiss operational wind farms
Wind farm	No. of turbines	Cap. (MW)	Turbine model	Municipality	Canton	Operator	Ref
Haldenstein	1	3.00	Vestas V112/3000	Haldenstein	Graubünden	Calandawind AG	
Charrat	1	3.00	Enercon E-101	Charrat	Valais	ValEole SA	
Collonges	1	2.00	Enercon E-70/E4	Collonges	Valais	RhônEole SA	
Feldmoos/Rengg	2	1.85	NEG Micon NM52 / 900 (1 ×); NEG Micon NM54 / 950 (1 ×)	Entlebuch	Luzern	WindPower AG	
Gries	4	9.36	Enercon E-70 (1 ×); Enercon E-92 (3 ×)	Obergoms	Valais	GriesWind AG	
Gütsch	5	7.30	Enercon E-44 (3 ×); Enercon E-70 EP4 (2 ×)	Andermatt	Uri	EW Ursern	
Uri	2	4.60	Enercon E-70 EP4 (2 ×)	Göschenen	Uri	energieUri AG	
Lutersarni	1	2.30	Enercon E-82 E2	Entlebuch	Luzern	Centralschweizerische Kraftwerke AG (CKW)	
Martigny	1	2.00	Enercon E-82	Martigny	Valais	RhônEole SA	
Mont Crosin	16	37.20	Vestas V90-2MW (12 ×); Vestas V112-3.3MW (4 ×)	Villeret and Cormoret	Bern	Juvent SA	
Peuchapatte	3	6.90	Enercon E-82	Muriaux	Jura	Eole Jura SA	
St. Brais	2	4.00	Enercon E-82	Saint-Brais	Jura	ADEV Windkraft AG	
San Gottardo	5	11.75	Enercon E-92	Airolo	Ticino	Azienda Elettrica Ticinese	
Sainte-Croix	6	13.80	Enercon E-82 E2	Sainte-Croix	Jura	Romande Energie SA	

Source: Swiss Federal Office of Energy SFOE

== Wind farms in planning or under construction ==
Wind farm	No. of turbines	Cap. (MW)	Turbine model	Com.	Municipality	Canton

== See also ==
- List of power stations in Switzerland
