= Mettmenstetten =

- Municipality
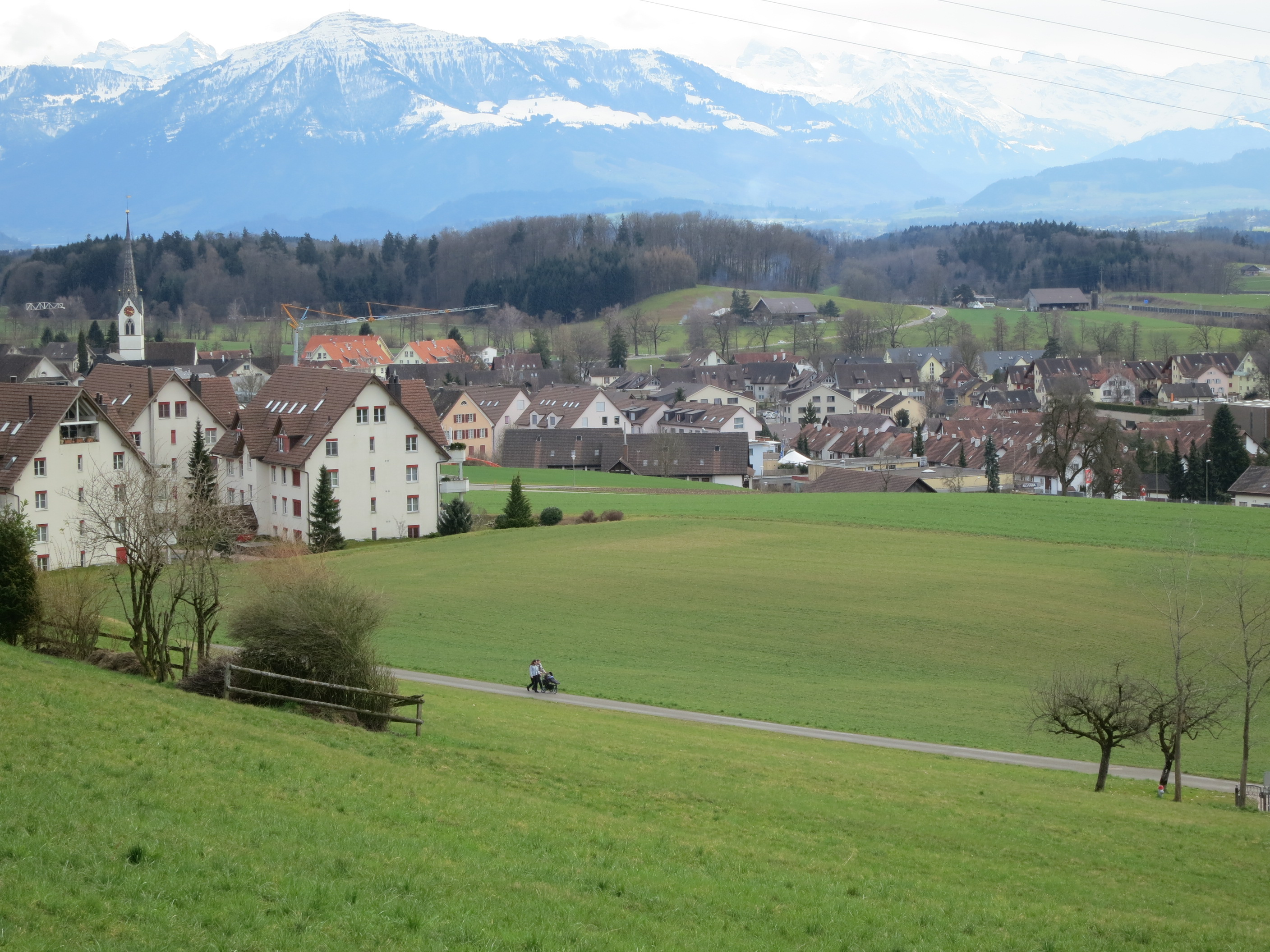

- Flag Coat of arms
- Location of Mettmenstetten
- Location within Switzerland Location within Canton of Zurich
- Coordinates: 47°15′N 8°28′E
- Country: Switzerland
- Canton: Zurich
- District: Affoltern

Government
  - Mayor: René Kälin

Area
  - Total: 13.11 km^{2} (5.06 sq mi)
- Elevation: 460 m (1,510 ft)

Population (December 2020)
  - Total: 5,380
  - Density: 410/km^{2} (1,060/sq mi)
- Time zone: UTC+01:00 (CET)
  - Summer (DST): UTC+02:00 (CEST)
- Postal code: 8932
- SFOS number: 9
- ISO 3166 code: CH-ZH
- Surrounded by: Aeugst am Albis, Affoltern am Albis, Kappel am Albis, Knonau, Maschwanden, Obfelden, Rifferswil
- Website: www.mettmenstetten.ch

Mettmenstetten (Swiss German: Mäpmischtette) is a village in the district of Affoltern in the canton of Zürich in Switzerland.

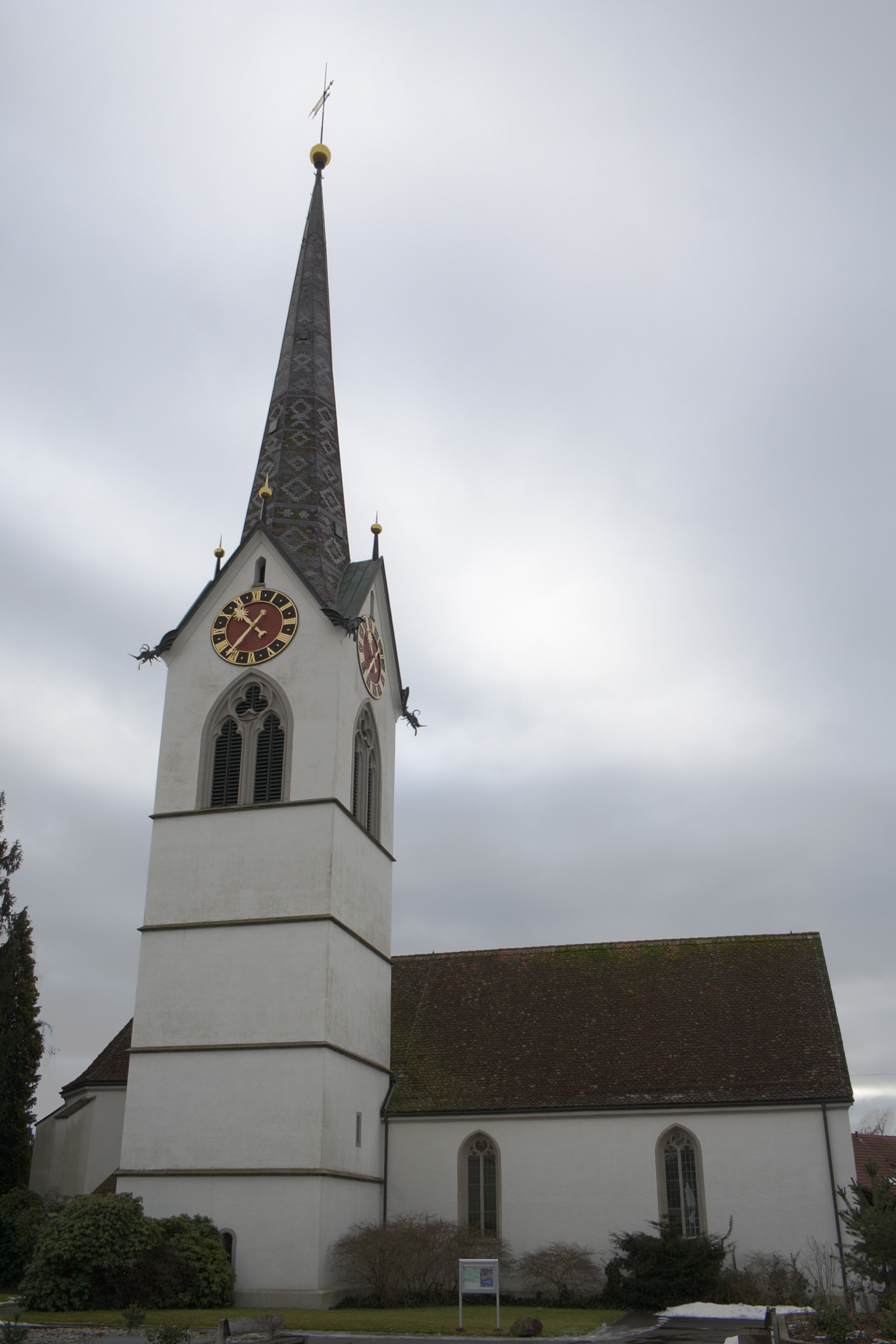
Mettmenstetten church

== Origin of the name and history ==
The town took its name from being "In the middle". It was listed as being in the middle of two other locations (the exact identity of the locations have been lost in time). Additionally, people used to overnight at Mettmenstetten when they were traveling between Zurich and Luzern, as this town is about in the middle of the route.

Mettmenstetten is first mentioned in 1116 as Metemunstat. It is mentioned as Mettmonstetten in 1240 and as Metamonstetten or Methemonstettin in 1255.

Mettmenstetten lies near the border between Canton Zurich and the Central Swiss Canton of Zug and therefore during the Reformation near the turbulent fault line between Protestant and Catholic Switzerland. In 1525 it is reported that the evangelical, Protestant parishioners of Mettmenstetten chased their new minister out of the village by throwing stones at him after hearing his first sermon.

In August and September 1899 Albert Einstein, then a student at the Swiss Federal Polytechnic in Zurich, spent a summer holiday at the Paradies, then a hotel, on the hill above the village. His occupations during this time included a walking tour in the direction of Einsiedeln and the upper part of Lake Zurich, as well as the study of "electric force".

== Geography ==
Aerial view from 300 m by Walter Mittelholzer (1923)

Mettmenstetten has an area of 13.1 km^{2} (5.1 sq mi). Of this area, 67.9% is used for agricultural purposes, while 18.9% is forested. Of the rest of the land, 13.1% is settled (buildings or roads) and the remainder (0.1%) is non-productive (rivers, glaciers or mountains).

It is located about 10 minutes driving distance from the City of Zug, and 25 minutes from the City of Zurich. Affoltern is about 5 minutes north.

The municipality includes the village of Mettmenstetten, with the two core sections of Ober- and Untermettmenstetten as well as the other sections; Dachlissen, Eigi, Grossholz, Herferswil, Hübscheren, Rossau and Wissenbach. It is located an elevation of 460 m (1,510 ft).

== Demographics ==
Mettmenstetten has a population (as of 31 December 2020) of 5,380. As of 2007, 15% of the population was made up of foreign nationals. Over the last 5 years the population has grown at a rate of 15%. Most of the population (as of 2000) speaks German (92.8%), with Serbo-Croatian being second most common ( 1.7%) and Italian being third ( 1.6%).

In the 2015 election to the National Council the most popular party was the SVP which received 35.7% of the vote. The next four most popular parties were the SPS (18.8%), the GLP (9.6%), the FDP (13.2%), and the GPS (5.1%).

The age distribution of the population (as of 2000) is children and teenagers (0–19 years old) make up 23% of the population, while adults (20–64 years old) make up 60% and seniors (over 64 years old) make up 17%. In Mettmenstetten about 83.2% of the population (between age 25-64) have completed either non-mandatory upper secondary education or additional higher education (either university or a Fachhochschule).

Mettmenstetten has an unemployment rate of 1.3%. As of 2018, there were 47 people employed in the primary economic sector and about 54 businesses involved in this sector. 521 people are employed in the secondary sector and there are 45 businesses in this sector. 939 people are employed in the tertiary sector, with 105 businesses in this sector.

year	population
1836	1,405
1850	1,450
1900	1,396
1950	1,710
2000	3,724
2018	5,093

== Education ==
The city offers daycare, kindergarten, primary and secondary school. There are 124 kids in the kindergarten, 327 in the primary school and 145 in the secondary school.

The daycare, called Domino, is located within the school area. The school also has an indoor swimming pool, two indoor sporthalls ("turnhallen") and a large outdoor grass area used mainly for sports.

== Transport ==
Mettmenstetten railway station is a stop of the Zürich S-Bahn on the line S5. It is a 13 minute ride from Zug, a 36 minute ride from Zürich Hauptbahnhof and 45 to 55 minutes from Zürich Flughafen.

It is only 10 minutes driving-distance to A4 highway that connects Zürich with Luzern.

== Local airport ==
Close to Mettmenstetten lies the private airport Hausen am Albis. Over 16.000 flight movements take place per year, mostly in the weekends and/or the summer. Although the official flight routes are not positioned over Mettmenstetten, the pilots of the private planes often decide to fly over Mettmenstetten instead. They also fly at a lower altitude than the official recommended height of 300 meters (for populated areas). This increases the noise pollution levels for the inhabitants of Mettmenstetten and the surrounding villages, leading them to take action.

== Notable people ==
- Hannah Pfalzgraf (born 1997), Swiss politician
