= Maschwanden =

- Municipality
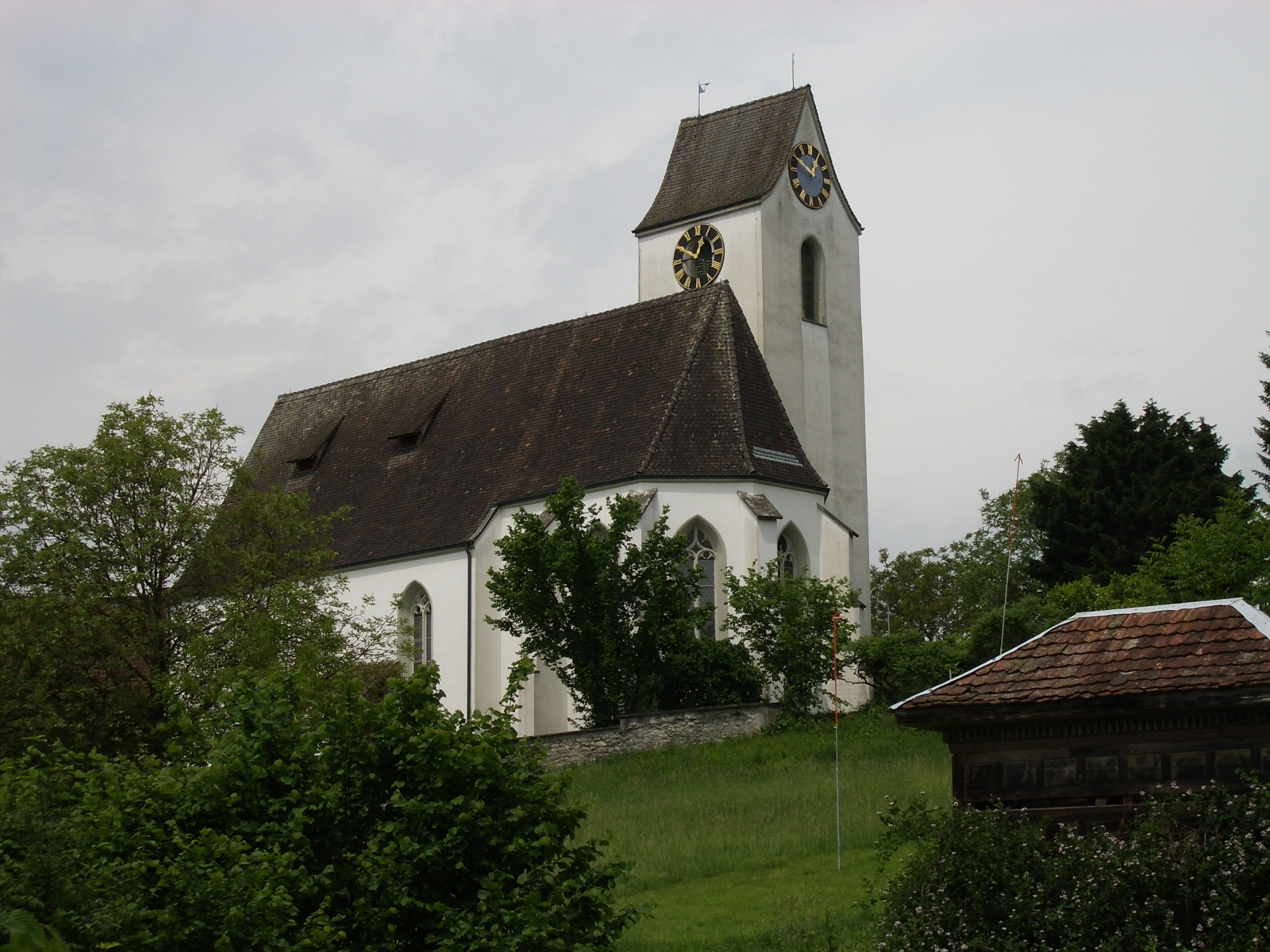

- Flag Coat of arms
- Location of Maschwanden
- Location within Switzerland Location within Canton of Zurich
- Coordinates: 47°14′N 8°26′E
- Country: Switzerland
- Canton: Zurich
- District: Affoltern

Area
  - Total: 4.67 km^{2} (1.80 sq mi)
- Elevation: 398 m (1,306 ft)

Population (December 2020)
  - Total: 641
  - Density: 137/km^{2} (355/sq mi)
- Time zone: UTC+01:00 (CET)
  - Summer (DST): UTC+02:00 (CEST)
- Postal code: 8933
- SFOS number: 8
- ISO 3166 code: CH-ZH
- Surrounded by: Cham (ZG), Hünenberg (ZG), Knonau, Mettmenstetten, Obfelden
- Website: www.maschwanden.ch

Maschwanden is a village in the district of Affoltern in the canton of Zürich in Switzerland.

== History ==
Aerial view (1947)

Maschwanden is first mentioned in 1189 as Maswondon. The Baron of Eschenbach owned a castle and the village, near the current municipality, at that time. However, in 1308 Walter von Eschenbach was present at the regicide of King Albert I of Germany near Windisch. In response to the murder, in 1309 the castle and village were both destroyed and never rebuilt. The ruins were located on a hill south-west of the modern village, which mostly consisted of gravel and was carried off during the 19th and 20th century.

== Geography ==
Maschwanden has an area of 4.7 km^{2} (1.8 sq mi). Of this area, 61.5% is used for agricultural purposes, while 24.1% is forested. Of the rest of the land, 8.3% is settled (buildings or roads) and the remainder (6%) is non-productive (rivers, glaciers or mountains).

The municipality is located on the east banks of the Reuss River near the confluence of the Lorze River into the Reuss.

== Demographics ==
Maschwanden has a population (as of 31 December 2020) of 641. As of 2007, 4.5% of the population was made up of foreign nationals. Over the last 10 years the population has grown at a rate of 12.8%. Most of the population (as of 2000) speaks German (97.8%), with Portuguese being second most common ( 0.7%) and Italian being third ( 0.5%).

In the 2007 election the most popular party was the SVP which received 45% of the vote. The next three most popular parties were the SPS (21.4%), the CSP (14.6%) and the Green Party (7.2%).

The age distribution of the population (as of 2000) is children and teenagers 19 years and younger make up 27.5% of the population, while adults 20 to 64 years old make up 59.3% and seniors over 64 years old make up 13.2%. About 81.4% of the population (between ages 25 and 64) have completed either non-mandatory upper secondary education or additional higher education (either university or a Fachhochschule).

Maschwanden has an unemployment rate of 0.36%. As of 2005, there were 61 people employed in the primary economic sector and about 24 businesses involved in this sector. 12 people are employed in the secondary sector and there are 4 businesses in this sector. 49 people are employed in the tertiary sector, with 19 businesses in this sector. The historical population is given in the following table:

year	population
1470	c. 120
1634	339
1786	507
1850	578
1900	493
1920	424
1950	470
1970	400
2000	553
