= Ottenbach Small Hydro =

Power station in Zurich, Switzerland

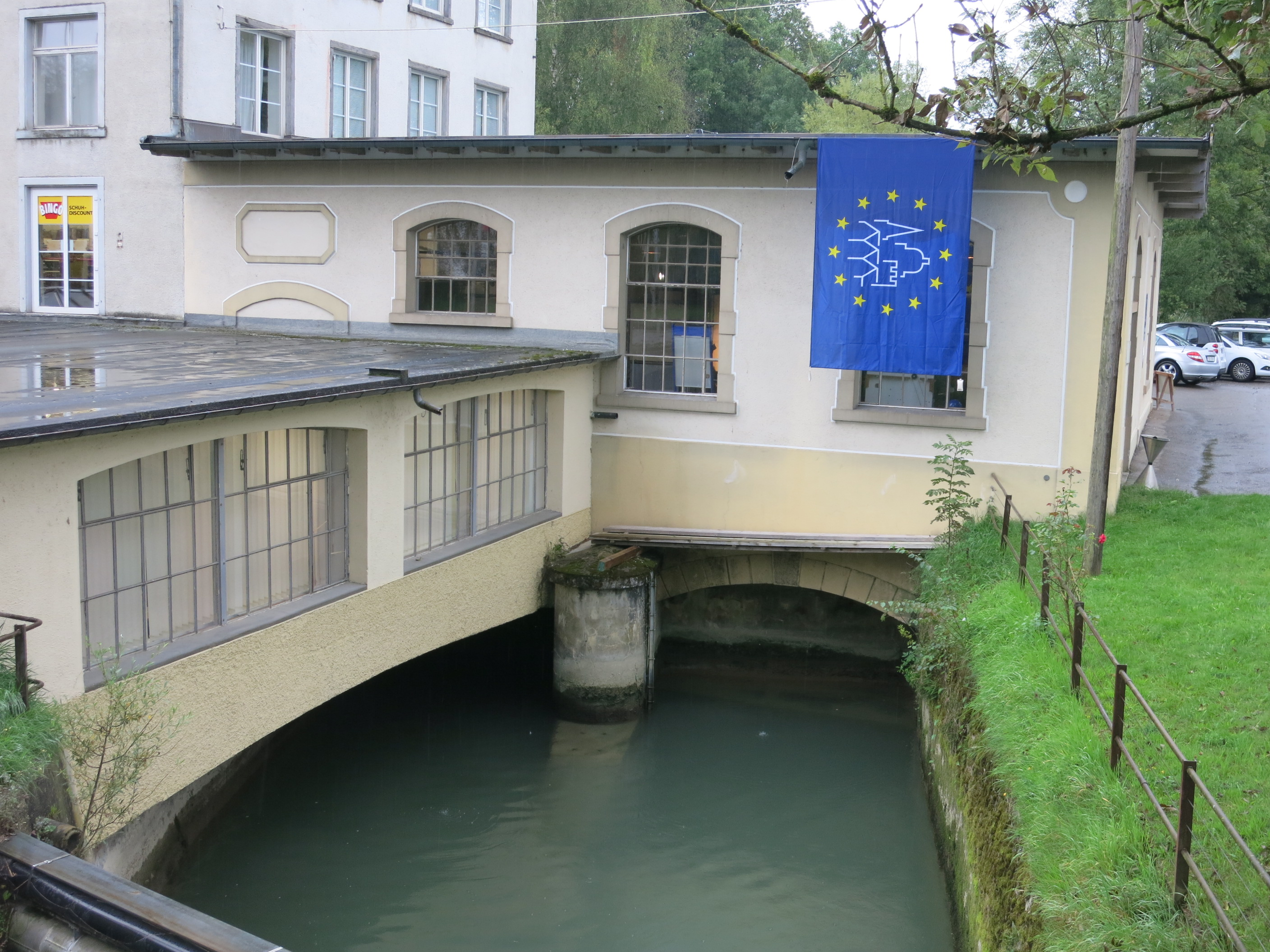
- Ottenbach Small Hydro in 2017
- Country: Switzerland
- Location: Ottenbach, Switzerland
- Coordinates: 47°16′47.46″N 8°23′50.68″E
- Status: N
- Commission date: 1920
- Decommission date: 1975
- Owner: Canton of Zürich

Thermal power station
- Turbine technology: Hydroelectric
- Site elevation: 387 m (1,270 ft)

Power generation
- Nameplate capacity: 0.062 MW

External links
- Website: www.kleinkraftwerk-ottenbach.ch
- Commons: Related media on Commons

The Ottenbach Small Hydro is a 1920 electrified small hydroelectric power station of the former Silk Weaving Mill A. F. Haas & Co. in the Swiss village of Ottenbach. It is preserved in its original condition of 1920, still able to operate, aimed to be an historical witness of the industrial archaeology. The ensemble of factory, power plant and hydraulic structures is a cultural asset under preservation order.

== History ==
From 1645 onwards, the millers of Ottenbach and Rickenbach used in addition to the ditches in the village the water of the river Reuss to grind the grain, because those did not supply enough water during the summer months. In 1833, the Canton of Zürich granted the license to use the water to operate a grain mill. In 1836 the miller Jakob Beerli built a canal with a dam in order to bring the water of the Reuss to the millwheel in a more regulated manner.

In 1869, the Zurich Mechanical Silk Weaving Mill (owned by Bodmer & Hürlimann) bought the former mill from Heinrich Schmid, who had bought it from his cousin Jakob Beerli and converted it into a textile factory. On November 9, 1871, Bodmer & Hürlimann received the water rights concession No. 19 from the Canton of Zurich, signed by the Town Clerk and Swiss poet Gottfried Keller. It was based on the old water rights concession of 1833 with minor modifications, and water power was used as a direct mechanical drive of the looms via the still existing bevel shaft and the transmission system. The mill wheel was replaced by a Jonval turbine (Bell Maschinenfabrik) in 1881. In 1909, the old turbine house was replaced by a new building according to the plans of the Hickel Engineering Office in Lucerne, and the bottom of the discharge channel was lowered so that a new Francis turbine (Uzwil Machine Factory) could be inserted into the former idling channel. At low water-levels in winter, a coal-fired locomotive was coupled to the transmissions instead of the turbine system. Two horse-drawn carts had to travel back and forth between Ottenbach and Affoltern am Albis railway station to bring the required amount of coal. In 1920, today's plant components were built in and the looms were electrically powered by a new, more powerful Francis turbine and a generator. During the global economic crisis, the company was overtaken by the Silk and Decorative Fabric Weaving mill A.F. Haas & Co., which produced until 1970 and since then has been running a textile trading business, today named Haas Shopping.

In 1977, the canton of Zurich purchased the adjacent nature reserve of Bibelaas, including the small power station, canal and dam, as a measure to protect the banks of the Reuss. In 2011/12, the headrace canal and the dam had to be repaired due to the damage caused by the floods of 2005 and 2007.

== Turbine house ==
The machines and drives in the turbine house date back to 1920, when the looms were converted to electric operation. In the basement there is the turbine, guide vanes and water chamber. In the engine room, the large bevel gear wheel, which sits on the turbine axis and is equipped with original wooden teeth from 1920, is set in motion by the rotational force of the turbine. With the small bevel gear wheel and the transmissions, the rotational force is transmitted to the bevel shaft, which drives the generator at 1000 revolutions per minute. The regulator measures the speed and then regulates the flow of water to the turbine in order to adapt the output to the water supply. In island operation mode it maintains the main frequency of 50 Hz.

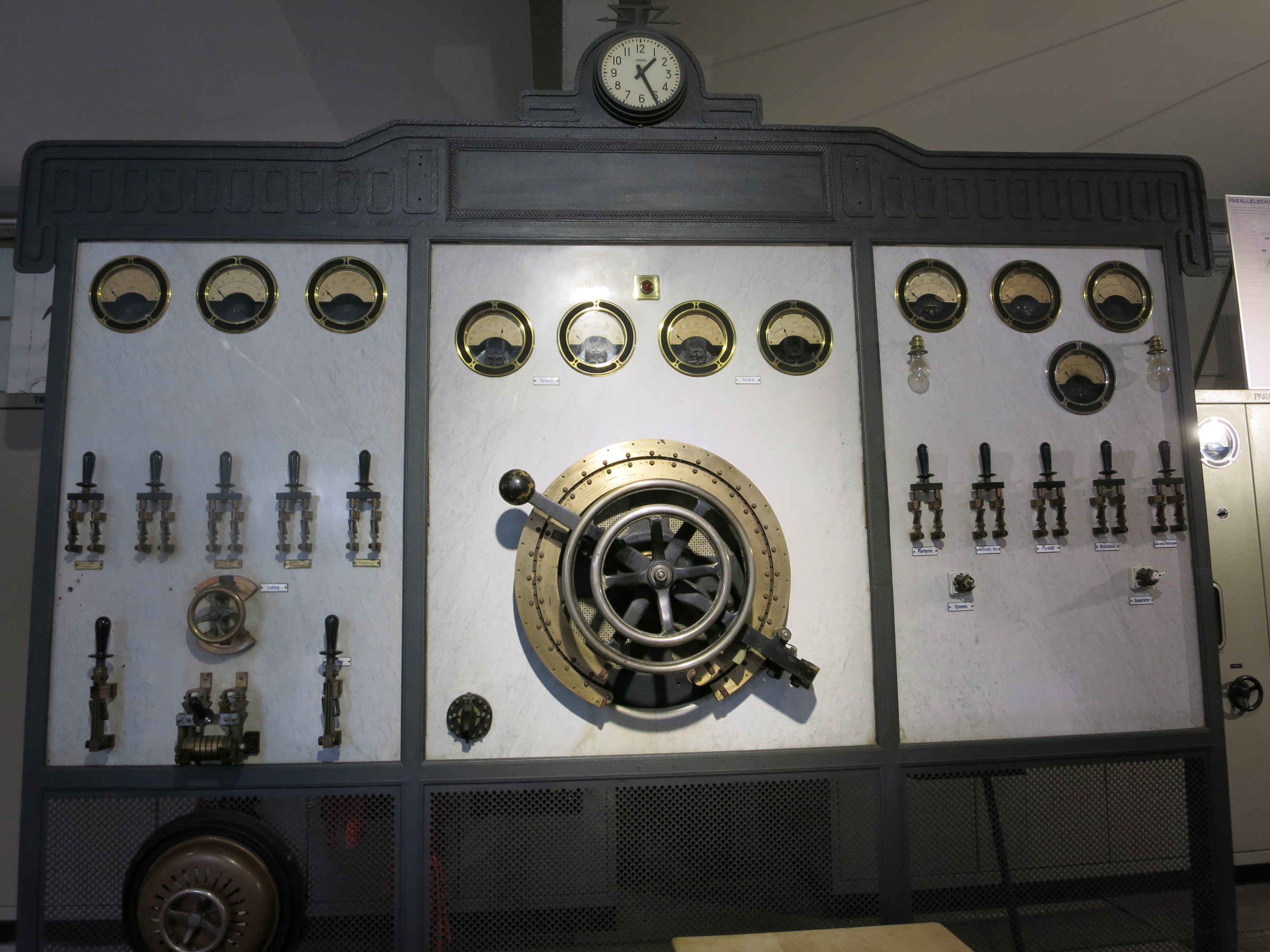
Art Deco-style switching wall

The water supply can be regulated by means of the guide vane, which is arranged around the turbine and consists of adjustable vanes. The water flows through the guide vanes onto the blades of the approx. 62 kW (84 hp) Francis turbine built by the Maschinenfabrik Bell and sets them in rotation.

From 1920 onwards electrification was installed. The looms were no longer driven mechanically via the bevel, but electrically with the electricity produced by the generator. Excess electricity was fed into the public grid from 1939 onwards, with the generator frequency being determined by the grid. The complex transmission system with large wheels and leather belts reminds us of the time before 1920 and, conversely, electricity could be drawn from the grid when the turbine was at a standstill. Built in 1920 by Brown, Boveri & Cie, the three-phase synchronous generator with attached exciter machine has an output of 62 kW. At a frequency of 50 Hz it has a speed of 1000 revolutions per minute.

In the engine room, the underground guide vanes are controlled by the regulator built by Bell Maschinenfabrik, to which they are connected by a linkage. Once the turbine has been started up with the handwheel, the oil pressure with the centrifugal governor ensures that the desired number of revolutions is constantly maintained.

The Art Deco-style switching wall with electromechanical measuring devices from Trüb, Fierz & Co. was used to control the lighting in the rooms hosting the looms. The direct current required for this was generated with a dynamo that is no longer available today and stored in an accumulator battery consisting of 150 glasses each filled with 100 litres of sulphuric acid.

== Factory canal and side weir ==
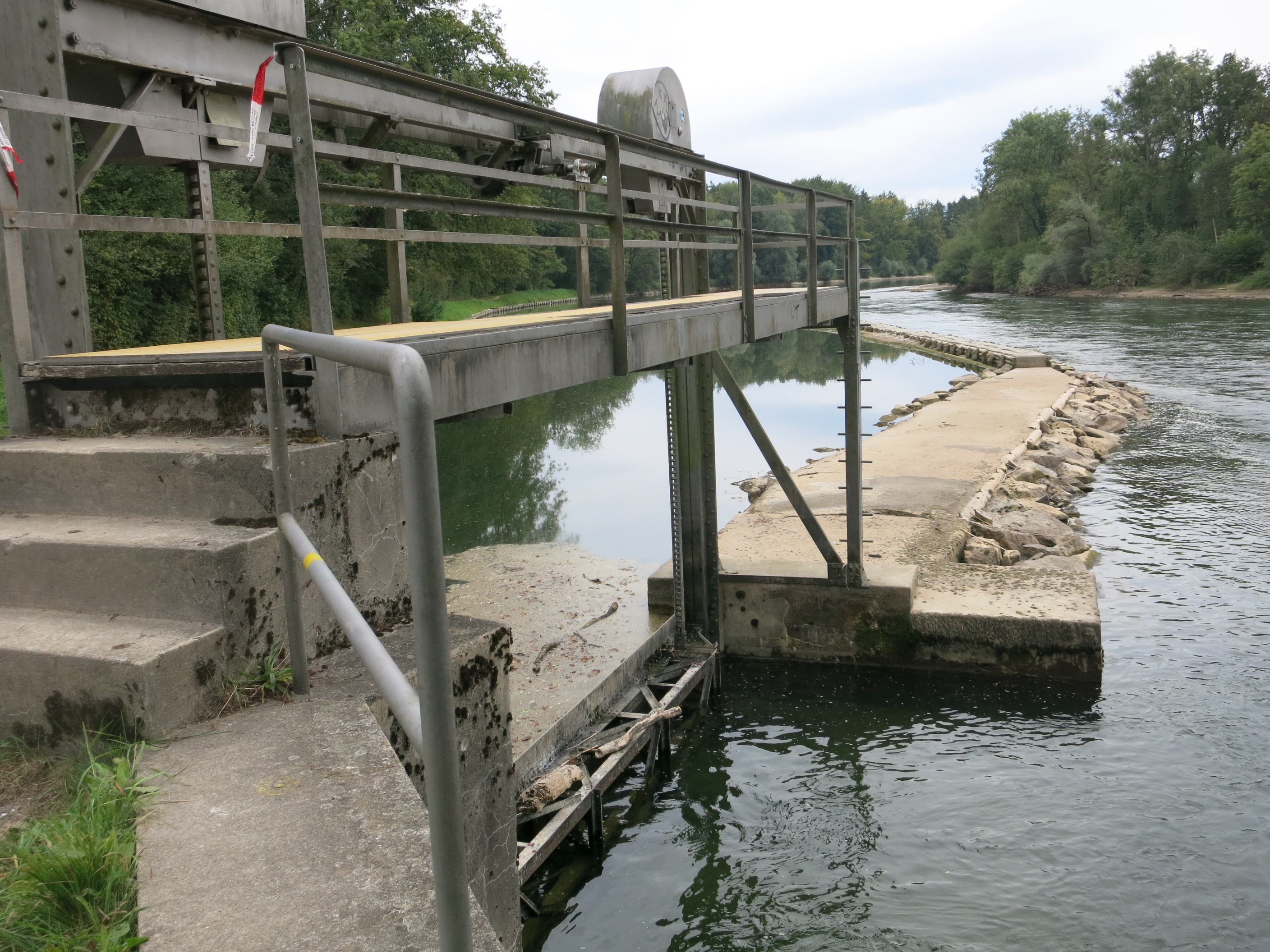
Side weir with gravel water trap

By the 200-metre-long dam - the longest of its kind in the Canton of Zurich - the Reuss water is directed through four gates to the headrace channel. With the gates, the amount of water flowing into the headrace channel can be regulated. The gravel water trap is used to flush away gravel and sand from the canal. For this purpose, it is opened once a year for a few days. The small power station is a run-of-river power station in which the water level of the headrace and tailrace canals is the same and the water can only be stored for a short time by closing the overflow or idle gate. When the gate is closed, the water is backed up until it flows over the gates out of wooden panel. In operating mode, the idle channel is closed and the turbine inlet channel is opened. By lifting the turbine inlet gate, the water from the headrace channel can flow through the flotsam screen into the turbine inlet. A worm gear is used to move a rack attached to the latch in order to lift or lower the wooden panels of the gate, consisting of several boards in their lateral guide rails. Since 1900, the canal, dam, alluvial traps have remained practically unchanged. The water out of the turbine flows back into the Reuss via an tailrace canal.

== Association Historical Ottenbach Small Hydro (VHKO) ==
Founded in 2013, the association is responsible for regular operation, ongoing maintenance work and flood protection on behalf of the Canton of Zurich's preservation of historical monuments. It carries out inspections and demonstrations (operation of the plant) for the public and researches and documents the technical and economic-social history of the small power plant. Group tours are available on request, open days are published on the website. The original equipment of 1920 is running for guided visits.

== See also ==
- List of power stations in Switzerland
