= Mirjam Indermaur =

Swiss author

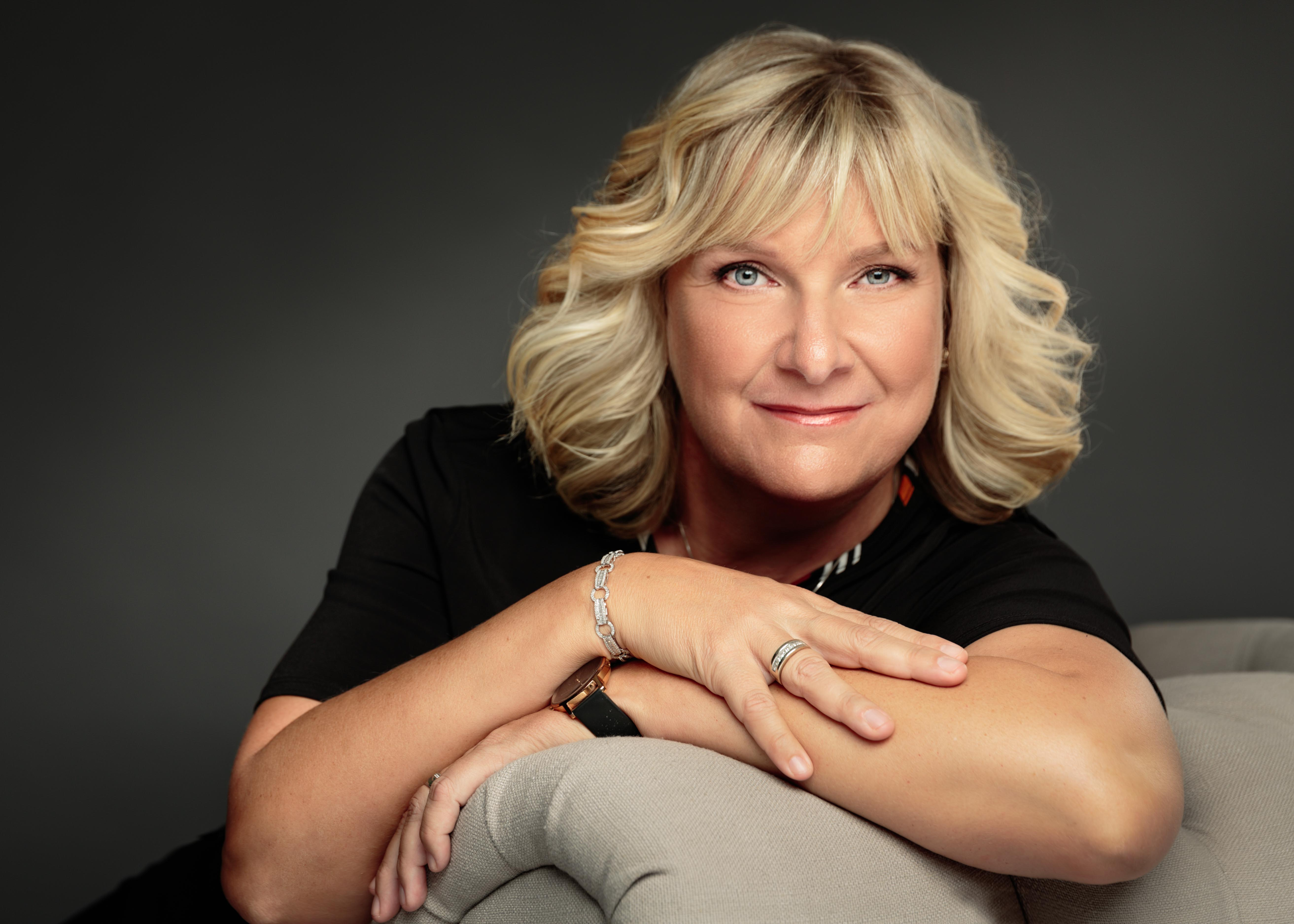
- Indermaur in 2019
- Born: Mirjam Lydia Indermaur; 1967 (age 58–59); Zug, Canton of Zug; Switzerland
- Occupations: businesswoman author
- Children: 3

Mirjam Lydia Indermaur (born 1967) is a Swiss businesswoman and author. In 2019, she co-wrote the book Ich habe einen Knall - Sie auch? with her therapist, Denise Hürlimann, about her experience with psychotherapy.

== Early life ==
Indermaur was born in 1967 in Zug, Switzerland. She is a member of the In der Maur family.

== Career ==
Indermaur works as a marketing specialist for her husband's technical trading company and is the chief executive officer of Comate, a marketing agency. She also runs a text design office and works as a marketing specialist for the electronic cigarette company Happy-Smoke, owned by her family.

Indermaur, who suffered from depression, began attending therapy with Denise Hürlimann, a trained psycho-oncologist and psychotherapist, after her husband was diagnosed with stomach cancer. After years of treatment with Hürlimann, Indermaur began recommending therapy to friends and colleagues. Indermaur and Hürlimann decided to co-write a book about their experiences working together as a therapist and patient in psychotherapy, which was published in 2019. The book, titled Ich habe einen Knall - Sie auch?, is a non-fiction memoir and guide book for psychotherapy.

== Personal life ==
Indermaur is married and has three children. She splits her time between homes in Obfelden, Switzerland, and Bonita Springs, Florida.
