= Niedersächsisches Symphonie-Orchester =

German symphony orchestra

The Niedersächsische Symphonie-Orchester (original name: Niedersachsenorchester, later: Niedersächsisches Symphonie-Orchester) was a German symphony orchestra from Hanover (NSO) that was founded in 1934. The Chief conductor was Fritz Lehmann until 1938.

== History ==
At the beginning of the 1938/39 concert season, Helmuth Thierfelder took over (1897–1966) and was the director of the orchestra – responsible for local and national concerts and festival performances. The first crisis in the orchestra's existence occurred in 1950, when the then Nordwestdeutscher Rundfunk Hamburg in Hanover – today's NDR Radiophilharmonie in Hanover – and the majority of the NSO's musicians switched over to broadcasting. This led to the refoundation of the orchestra under new sponsorship, consisting of the city of Hanover and the state of Lower Saxony. From then on, the new NSO took a steep ascent and was also used for Radio Bremen. In addition to Thierfelder, Rainer Koch was appointed second conductor from 1961–1965. In 1964, Thierfelder resigned from his post as principal conductor and Rudolf Alberth – coming from Munich – took over the position of principal conductor. Robert Stehli succeeded Koch as second conductor in 1965. As guest conductors, Hans Zanotelli and Franz-Paul Decker were engaged for a series of concerts. In 1968, due to lack of funds, the NSO could not continue to be sponsored by the state of Lower Saxony, and the orchestra was therefore dissolved at the end of the 1967/68 season.
