= Hans Zanotelli =

20th-century German conductor

Hans Zanotelli (23 August 1927 – 12 July 1993) was a German conductor.

== Life ==
Born in Cronenberg, now part of Wuppertal, Zanotelli learned to play the violin and piano as a child. He studied music at the Musikhochschule Köln from 1942 to 1944, conducting with Hans Swarowsky.

Zanotelli began his career as a répétiteur at the Remscheid-Solingen theatres. At the age of 24, he became Kapellmeister in Düsseldorf, after which he moved to the Oper Bonn and Hamburgische Staatsoper. In 1957, he was appointed Generalmusikdirektor (GMD) at the Darmstadt, as the youngest GMD in Germany at that time. In 1963, he moved to Theater Augsburg as GMD and deputy artistic director. In 1971, Zanotelli became chief conductor of Stuttgarter Philharmoniker, promoted to GMD in 1975. He held the post until 1984. He also conducted at the Deutsche Oper Berlin and the Bavarian State Opera.

As a guest, Zanotelli also conducted concerts of the Niedersächsisches Symphonie-Orchester in 1966 and 1967 Hannover. In 1977, Zanotelli was appointed professor and in 1984 he received the Bundesverdienstkreuz. From 1985, he was GMD of Kiel, responsible for Opernhaus Kiel.

Zanotelli had to end his career in 1987 for health reasons. He died in 1993 in Stuttgart at the age of 65 and is buried in his native hometown.

== Recordings ==
Zanotelli conducted a recording of excerpts from Mozart's Don Giovanni, sung in German by a cast including Hermann Prey, Elisabeth Grümmer and Fritz Wunderlich. He conducted Beethoven's Piano Concerto No. 4 in G major (Sapphire, Intercord Klassische Diskothek INT 120.933) with pianist Ernst Gröschel and the Bamberger Symphoniker. Producer Alfred Scholz published countless sound recordings with an orchestra he called the "Süddeutsche Philharmonie", many of them with fictitious conductor names, but also those with the name of conductor Zanotelli. Some doubt whether the recordings of the Süddeutsche Philharmonie were actually conducted by Zanotelli.
