= Rudolf Alberth =

German conductor and composer

Rudolf Alberth (writing into the 1950s: Albert) (28 March 1918 – 29 May 1992) was a German conductor.

Born in Frankfurt am Main, Alberth originally studied in composition at the Hoch Conservatory, however instead took up interest as a conductor and made his conducting debut in 1945. Alberth was strongly committed to contemporary music, in particular with the Bayerischer Rundfunk and conducted numerous world premieres at home and abroad. In the 1950s he collaborated with Olivier Messiaen in Paris and conducted the premiere of Messiaen's composition Oiseaux exotiques in the Théâtre Marigny on 10 March 1956. In 1964 Alberth was appointed principal conductor of the Niedersächsisches Symphonie-Orchester in Hannover which he conducted until the dissolution of the orchestra at the end of the 1967/1968 concert season.

Alberth has left numerous recordings in the BR archives, including his own works; commercial recordings are also available from Telefunken and the French Club de Disques. He is the author of a book in which he presents personal experiences and reflections on music: Da capo. Heiteres und Nachdenkliches aus meinem Musikerleben, Munich: Langen Müller 1980.

Alberth died in Munich at age 74.
