= Wysswasser Power Station =

Hydroelectric power station in Switzerland

- Country: Switzerland
- Location: Fiesch, Switzerland
- Coordinates: 46°23′48″N 8°08′07″E
- Status: Operational
- Commission date: 2012

Thermal power station
- Turbine technology: Hydroelectric

Power generation
- Nameplate capacity: 3.1 MW

Wysswasser power station is a small hydroelectric powerstation in the village of Fiesch, Switzerland. It yields 8.2 GWh per year
