= Mubisa power station =

Hydroelectric power station in Switzerland

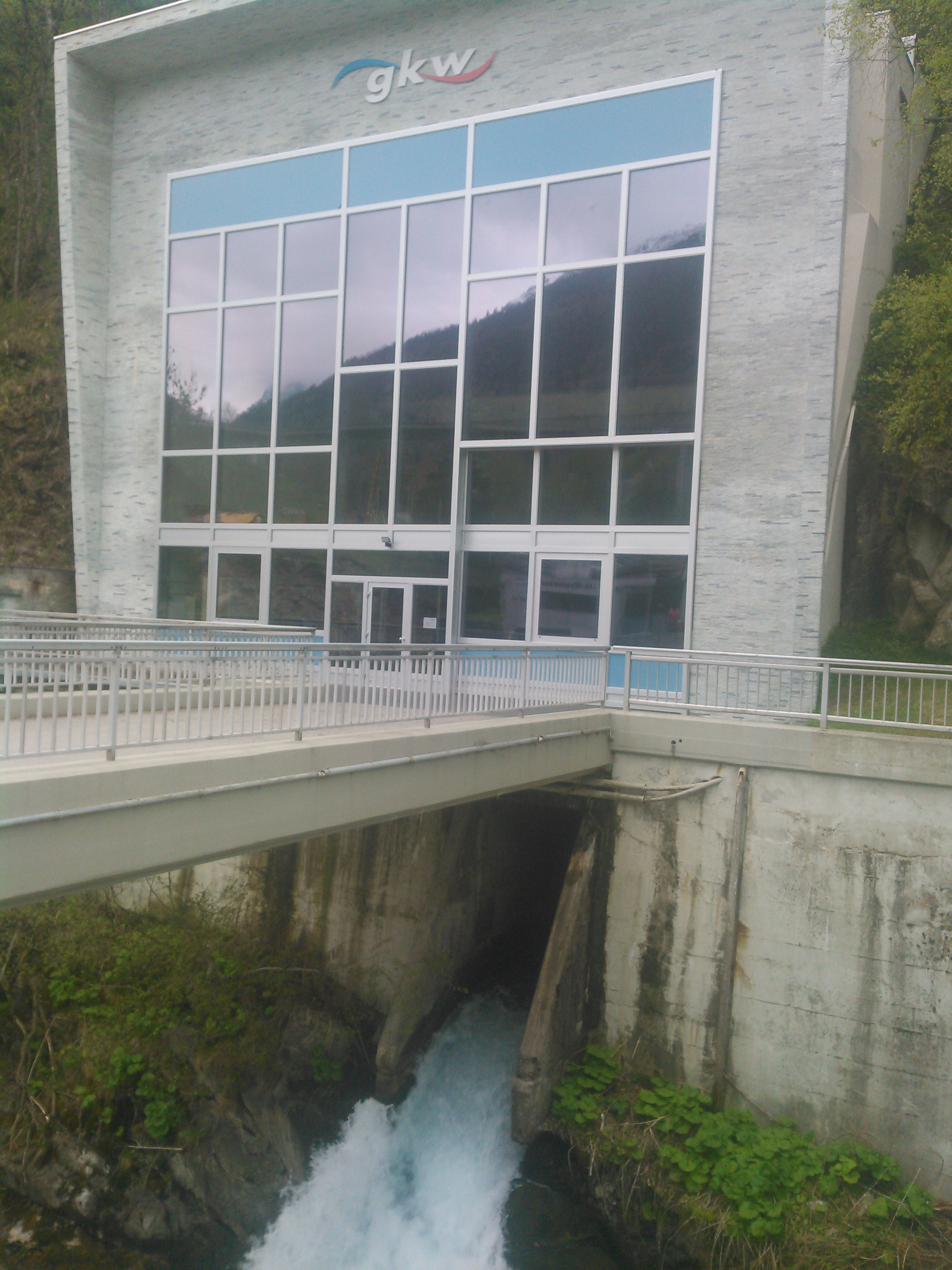
Mubisa hydroelectric power station

Mubisa power station is a small hydroelectric power station in Ernen, Switzerland. It is the first power station commissioned by Gommerkraftwerke AG. It was commissioned in 1964 and has two 13 MW pelton turbines.
