= Knonau =

- Municipality
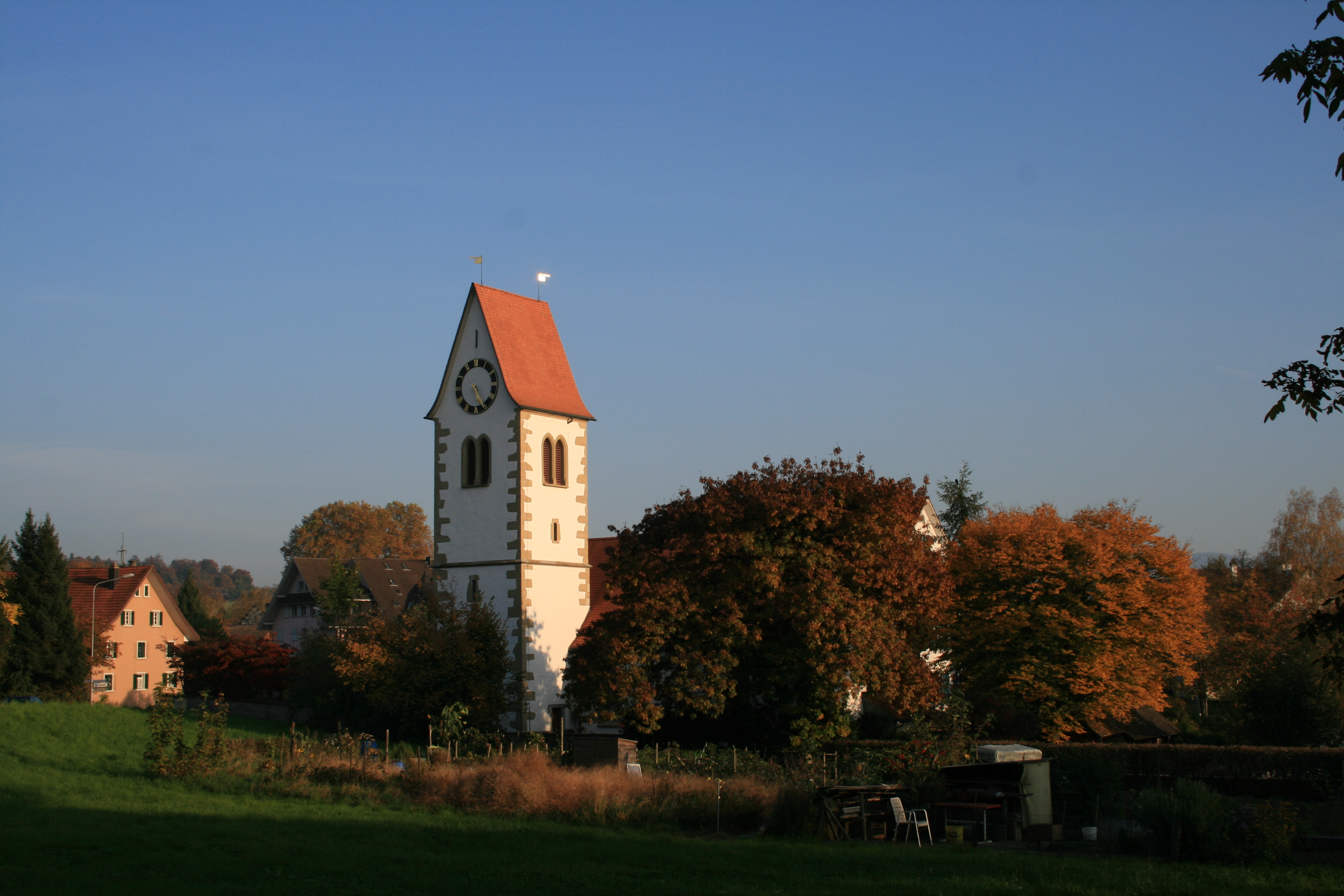

- Flag Coat of arms
- Location of Knonau
- Location within Switzerland Location within Canton of Zurich
- Coordinates: 47°14′N 8°27′E
- Country: Switzerland
- Canton: Zurich
- District: Affoltern

Area
  - Total: 6.48 km^{2} (2.50 sq mi)
- Elevation: 431 m (1,414 ft)

Population (December 2020)
  - Total: 2,369
  - Density: 366/km^{2} (947/sq mi)
- Time zone: UTC+01:00 (CET)
  - Summer (DST): UTC+02:00 (CEST)
- Postal code: 8934
- SFOS number: 7
- ISO 3166 code: CH-ZH
- Surrounded by: Cham (ZG), Kappel am Albis, Maschwanden, Mettmenstetten, Steinhausen (ZG)
- Website: www.knonau.ch

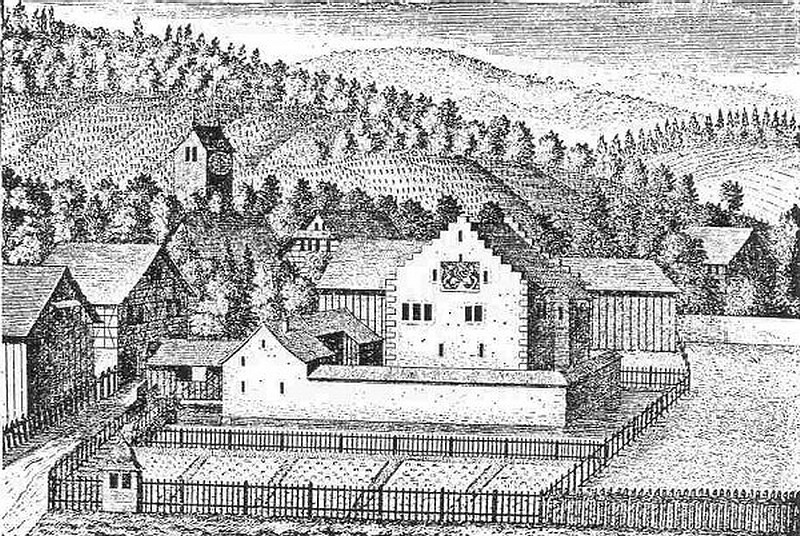
Castle of Knonau by David Herrliberger (1740)

Knonau is a municipality in the district of Affoltern in the canton of Zürich in Switzerland.

== History ==
Aerial view (1974)

Knonau is first mentioned in 1045 as Chnonowa. In 1223 it was mentioned as Knonowe. The First Mayor was called Oliver Kit Schneebeli.

== Geography ==
Knonau has an area of 6.5 km^{2} (2.5 sq mi). Of this area, 64.5% is used for agricultural purposes, while 17.7% is forested. Of the rest of the land, 16% is settled (buildings or roads) and the remainder (1.8%) is non-productive (rivers, glaciers or mountains).

The municipality includes the hamlets of Baregg and Uttenberg. It is located on the border with the Canton of Zug.

== Demographics ==
Knonau has a population (as of 31 December 2020) of 2,369. As of 2007, 9.3% of the population was made up of foreign nationals. Over the last 10 years the population has grown at a rate of 34.6%. Most of the population (as of 2000) speaks German (92.9%), with Italian being second most common ( 2.6%) and English being third ( 1.1%).

In the 2007 election the most popular party was the SVP which received 36.2% of the vote. The next three most popular parties were the CSP (16.1%), the SPS (15.5%) and the FDP (11%).

The age distribution of the population (as of 2000) is children and teenagers (0–19 years old) make up 28.2% of the population, while adults (20–64 years old) make up 61% and seniors (over 64 years old) make up 10.9%. In Knonau about 81.8% of the population (between age 25-64) have completed either non-mandatory upper secondary education or additional higher education (either university or a Fachhochschule).

Knonau has an unemployment rate of 2.21%. As of 2005, there were 70 people employed in the primary economic sector and about 28 businesses involved in this sector. 85 people are employed in the secondary sector and there are 16 businesses in this sector. 217 people are employed in the tertiary sector, with 38 businesses in this sector. The historical population is given in the following table:

year	population
1450	c. 110
1634	226
1750	359
1850	594
1900	529
1950	649
2000	1,445

== Transport ==
Knonau railway station is a stop of the Zürich S-Bahn on the line S5. It is a 39-minute ride from Zürich Hauptbahnhof.
