= Stehli Silks =

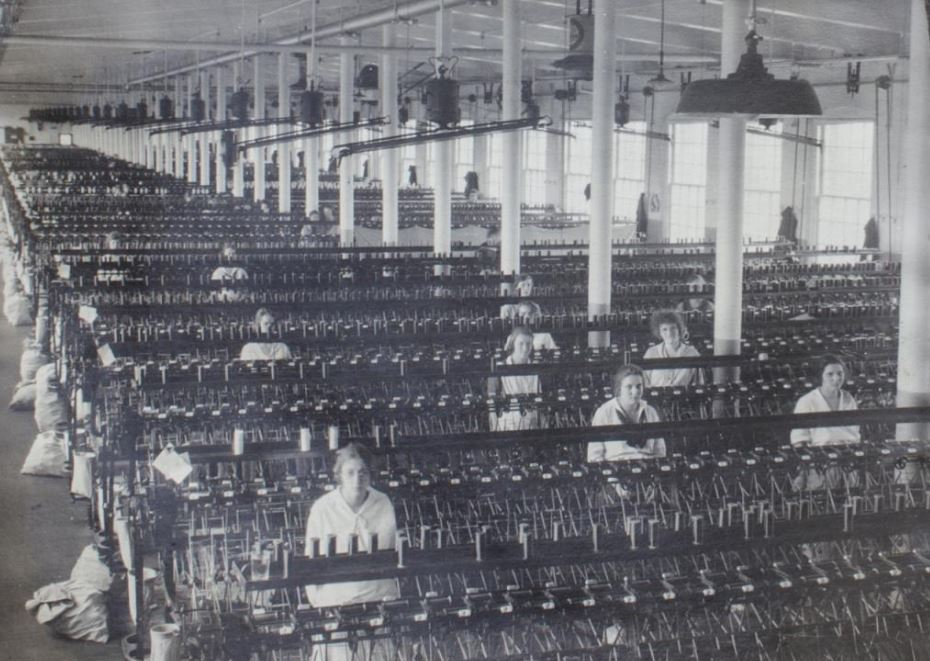
- Bobbin weaving (Lancaster, PA), 1923
- Native name: Stehli Seiden AG
- Formerly: Stehli Silks Corporation
- Type: Private company
- Founded: 1837; 189 years ago as R. Stehli-Hausheer & Sohn Obfelden, Switzerland; 1897; 129 years ago as Stehli Silks Corporation; Lancaster, Pennsylvania, US
- Founder: Rudolf Stehli-Hausheer
- Defunct: 1996
- Fate: Business transformation
- Number of locations: 5+ (1920)
- Revenue: CHF 69 million (1969)
- Owner: Stehli family
- Number of employees: 4,000+ (1920)
- Website: www.stehliseiden.ch (in German)

Stehli Silks (formerly Stehli Silks Corporation) was a Swiss textile manufacturing company. Founded in 1837, Stehli Silks was among the largest silk fabric producers in the world, with a workforce exceeding 4,000 people (1920) at its peak. More than half of its workforce was employed at the subsidiary Stehli Silks Corporation in Lancaster, Pennsylvania, which opened in 1897.

In 1996, the concern ceased manufacturing operations, and was converted into a real estate company that was only active in Switzerland (Stehli-Areal in Obfelden, ZH). The former mills in Lancaster were sold to Stehli Mill, LLC, a joint-venture between Rhode Island and Maryland-based real estate developers, but their redevelopment efforts stalled. In 2015, the former mills in Lancaster were added to the National Register of Historic Places. In 2023, the new developers began construction of 165 loft-style apartments in the former silk mills with plans to market the redeveloped site as Stehli Mill Lofts.

== History ==
=== Origins ===
Stehli Silks was founded in 1837 by Swiss Rudolf Stehli-Hausheer (1816–1884) in the village of Obfelden near Zürich. He was originally a merchant and wine merchant who also served as a member of the Cantonal Council of Zürich and the National Council (Switzerland). In 1840, he started to engage in the growing silk industry in Switzerland by investing in 40 handlooms and also brought in jacquard machines to produce Umbrellas. These operations already seized in 1879 due to profitability. From then on the company focussed solely on silk manufacturing. Between 1870 and 1871, the Swiss company grew steadily at two locations, in Obfelden and Oberarth, and at its peak the Stehli mills in Switzerland employed over 2,000 people.

=== Expansion ===
Under the second generation with Robert Stehli and Emil Stehli, sons of Rudolf, the textile concern expanded operations and merchant activities overseas. Initially, Emil expanded to the Kingdom of Italy in 1885. He took-over a silk mill that was formed in 1840 by Swiss Francesco Huber and was currently owned and managed by Cesare Bozzotti, in Germignaga on Lake Como. Stehli further purchased two more production plants in Porto Valtravaglia and Prassede.

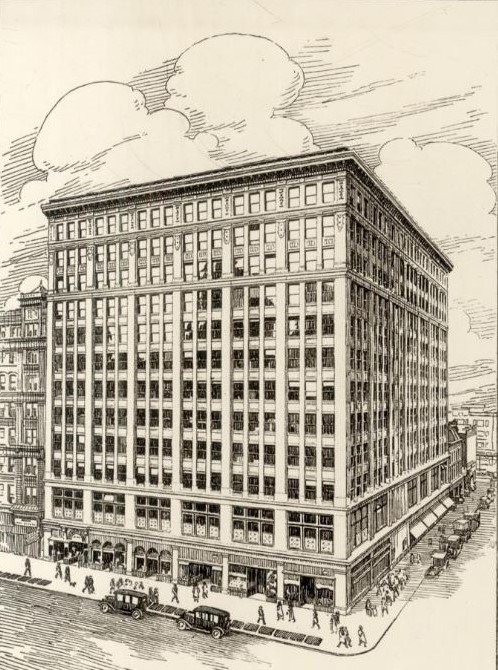
Stehli headquarters, New York (1930)

Robert Stehli built the Stehli mills in Lancaster, Pennsylvania in 1897. On October 23, 1897 The New York Times reported:

Robert Stehli of the firm of Stehli & Co. of Zurich, Switzerland, and Robert M. Bartow of New York, the American correspondent of the firm, are in New York and this afternoon closed a deal with the Board of Trade whereby the firm will at once establish a large silk industry in the United States. Work on the erection of the new plant was to begin at once. As soon as the building was ready for occupancy, 1,000 looms will be put in operation in the manufacture of silks. The new industry will employ only American labor, and the plant will be the largest in the United States.

— The New York Times, 1897

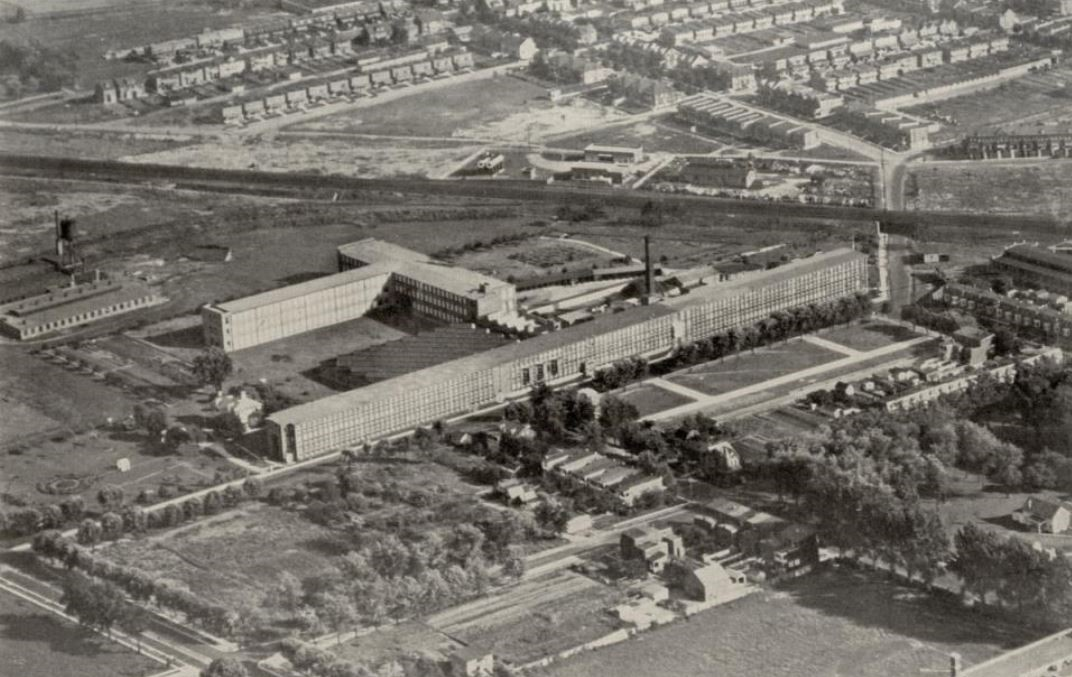
Stehli Silks Corporation, Lancaster, PA (1930)

Stehli Silks Corporation also operated plants in High Point, North Carolina (1902–1935), Waynesboro, Virginia (1925–1941) and Harrisonburg, Virginia. The American subsidiary had its peak of operation in the 1920s, when over 2,100 workers were employed. The headquarters were at 200 Madison Avenue in Manhattan, New York. It was one of the largest silk manufacturing concerns in the world. During the Great Depression the concern began to struggle and ultimately ceased operations in 1954 in the United States.

=== Business transformation ===
In 1977, the Swiss factories stopped producing silk due to profitability. Initially, production remained in Italy and the Swiss headquarters were still responsible for design and sales distribution. In 1996, all textile operations ended. Stehli Seiden AG (formed in 1958) remained as real estate company and today manages the former manufacturing plants, who all were turned into residential lofts until 2016.

== Artistic preservation ==
Several Stehli silks are exhibited by the Metropolitan Museum of Art in New York City.

== Literature ==
- Mills of the Stehli Silks Corporation. Verlag Stehli Silks Corp., Lancaster, Pa., 1929.
- R. Stehli-Zweifel: Stehli & Co., Zürich und New York, 1840–1940. Obfelden 1940. (in German)
- Geschichte der Gemeinde Obfelden. 1947. (in German)
- H. R. Schmid: Rudolf Stehli-Hausheer (1816–1884). In: Schweizer Pioniere der Wirtschaft und Technik. 2. 1955. (in German)
- Megan Searing: The Stehli Silk Company Strikes Back – The Americana Series of the 1920s. In: Trans-Lux. Volume 20, Issue I (PDF; 384 kB).
- Erich Gruner: Die Schweizerische Bundesversammlung 1848–1920. Band 1. Verlag Francke, Bern 1966. (in German)
- Stehli. Silk Memory, Hochschule Luzern. (in German)
- Archivgewebe. Geschichten aus der Sammlung Stehli Seiden. 2017. Interviews zum Buch Archivgewebe (Video; 39 Minuten). (in German)
- Kunst am Bau. Die Biografie in Schrift- und Bildtafeln. Loft-Wohnungen Obfelden (PDF; 308 kB). (in German)
