= Obfelden =

- Municipality
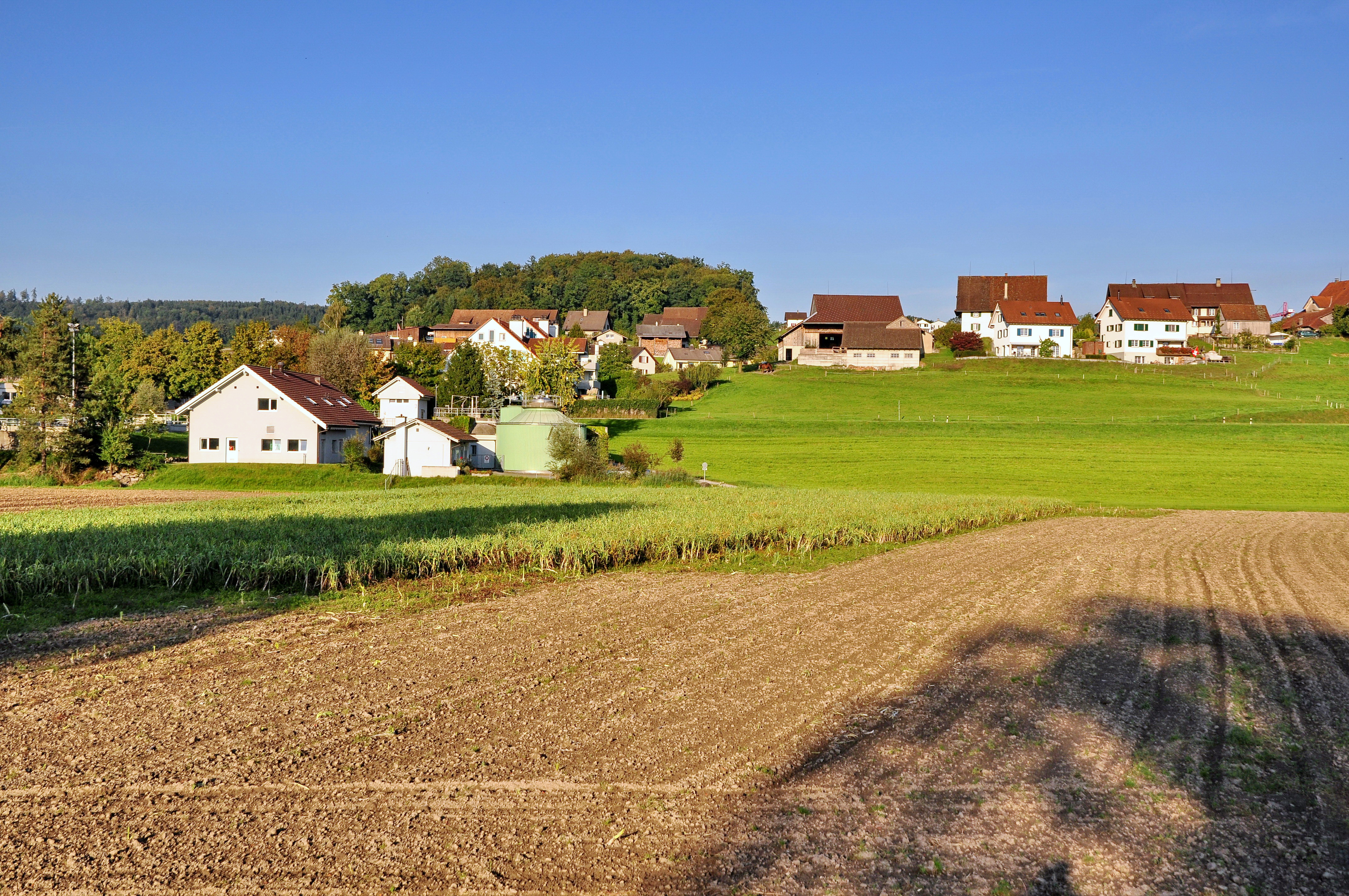

- Flag Coat of arms
- Location of Obfelden
- Location within Switzerland Location within Canton of Zurich
- Coordinates: 47°16′N 8°25′E
- Country: Switzerland
- Canton: Zurich
- District: Affoltern

Area
  - Total: 7.54 km^{2} (2.91 sq mi)
- Elevation: 430 m (1,410 ft)

Population (December 2020)
  - Total: 5,779
  - Density: 766/km^{2} (1,990/sq mi)
- Time zone: UTC+01:00 (CET)
  - Summer (DST): UTC+02:00 (CEST)
- Postal code: 8912
- SFOS number: 10
- ISO 3166 code: CH-ZH
- Surrounded by: Affoltern am Albis, Hünenberg (ZG), Maschwanden, Merenschwand (AG), Mettmenstetten, Ottenbach
- Website: www.obfelden.ch

Obfelden (Swiss German: Obfälde) is a municipality in the district of Affoltern in the canton of Zürich in Switzerland.

== History ==
Politically, Obfelden is the youngest municipality in Affoltern, though settlements in the area date back to the Alemannic-Franconian period in the 5th century AD. Early activity coalesced around five hamlets: Bickwil (first mentioned in 1246 as Bickewilare), Oberlunnern and Unterlunnern (1257 Lundenerun and Lunderun inferioris), Wolsen (1311 Wolunsun), and Toussen (1325 Thunsen). These five hamlets were known collectively as being ob dem Feld ("over the field") from neighbouring Ottenbach; most fell under the jurisdiction of Maschwanden, although Toussen and part of Unterlunnern came under the Zürich Freiamt. Both of these areas were merged into Knonau (today's Affoltern district) in the sixteenth century, when the hamlets of Obfelden became a part of the nearby parish of Ottenbach.

In the nineteenth century, local authorities began to take steps toward creating their own separate community, and an independent ecclesiastical and municipal entity was formally created in 1847 under a new village church completed the following year. The original separate hamlet councils were officially dissolved in 1877. The town's coat of arms commemorates this history, with five ears of wheat symbolising the five hamlets, held together by a band representing their union to the new church.

Aerial view (1947)

== Geography ==
Obfelden has an area of 7.6 km^{2} (2.9 sq mi). Of this area, 54.3% is used for agricultural purposes, while 22.6% is forested. Of the rest of the land, 20.1% is settled (buildings or roads) and the remainder (2.9%) is non-productive (rivers, glaciers or mountains).

The municipality is located on the Reuss River and on the border with the Canton of Aargau. It consists of five smaller communities; Bickwil, Ober-, Unterlunnern, Wolsen and Toussen.

== Demographics ==
Obfelden has a population (as of 31 December 2020) of 5,779. As of 2007, 16.0% of the population was made up of foreign nationals. Over the last 10 years the population has grown at a rate of 7.6%. Most of the population (as of 2000) speaks German (89.6%), with Italian being second most common ( 3.9%) and Albanian being third ( 1.7%).

In the 2007 election, the most popular party was the SVP which received 38% of the vote. The next three most popular parties were the SPS (15.6%), the FDP (12%) and the CSP (11.5%).

The age distribution of the population (as of 2000)is children and teenagers (0–19 years old) make up 25.9% of the population, while adults (20–64 years old) make up 64.4% and seniors (over 64 years old) make up 9.7%. In Obfelden about 78.4% of the population (between age 25–64) have completed either non-mandatory upper secondary education or additional higher education (either university or a Fachhochschule).

Obfelden has an unemployment rate of 2%. As of 2005, there were 90 people employed in the primary economic sector and about 26 businesses involved in this sector. 334 people are employed in the secondary sector and there are 57 businesses in this sector. 659 people are employed in the tertiary sector, with 130 businesses in this sector. The historical population is given in the following table:

year	population
1450	c. 24 Households
1634	311
1668	562
1799	789
1850	896
1900	1,335
1950	1,517
2000	4,182

== Notable residents ==
- Mirjam Indermaur, Swiss author
