= Ottenbach, Switzerland =

Ottenbach
- Municipality
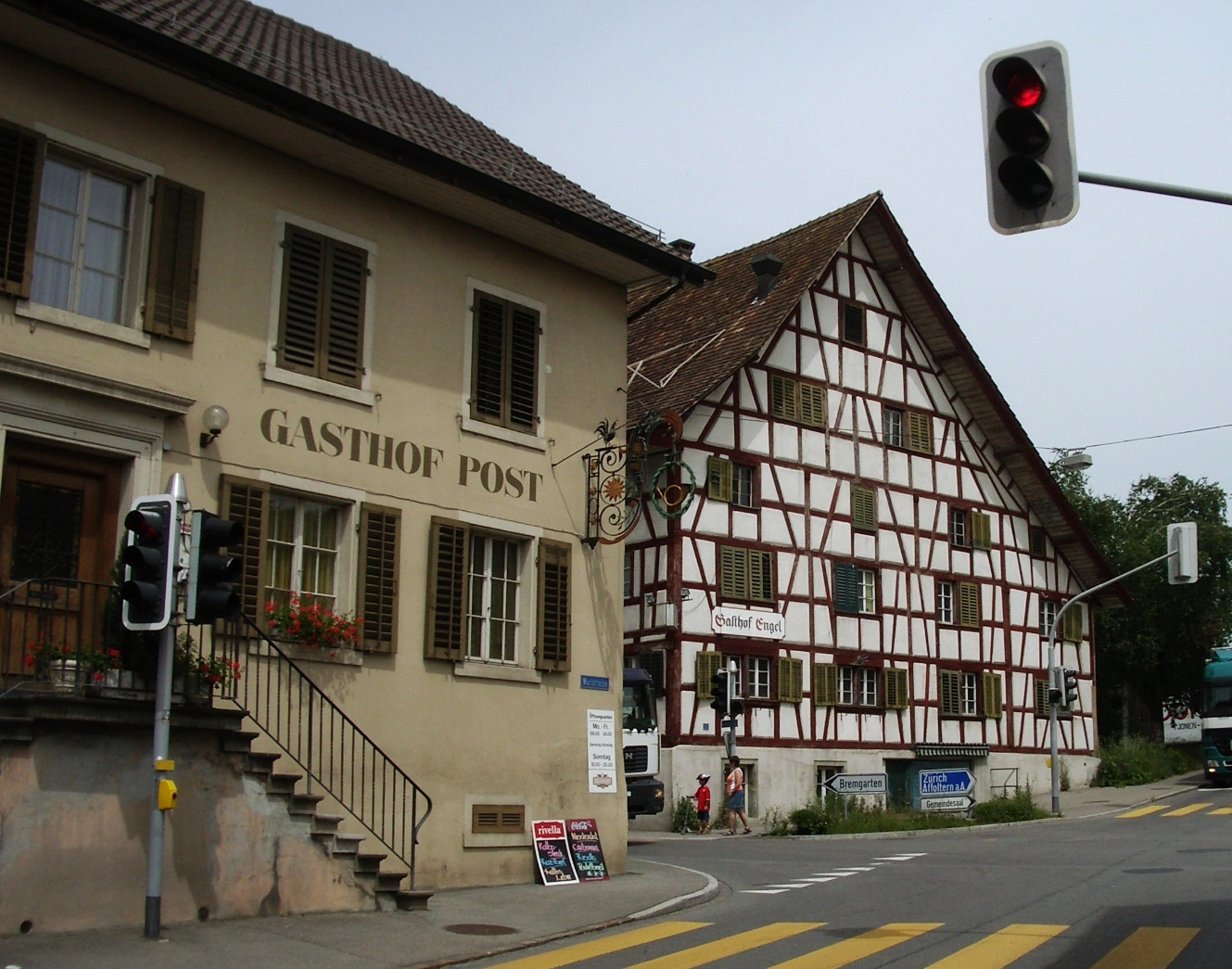

- Flag Coat of arms
- Location of Ottenbach
- Location within Switzerland Location within Canton of Zurich
- Coordinates: 47°17′N 8°24′E
- Country: Switzerland
- Canton: Zurich
- District: Affoltern

Area
  - Total: 4.98 km^{2} (1.92 sq mi)
- Elevation: 409 m (1,342 ft)

Population (December 2020)
  - Total: 2,704
  - Density: 543/km^{2} (1,410/sq mi)
- Time zone: UTC+01:00 (CET)
  - Summer (DST): UTC+02:00 (CEST)
- Postal code: 8913
- SFOS number: 11
- ISO 3166 code: CH-ZH
- Surrounded by: Affoltern am Albis, Aristau (AG), Jonen (AG), Merenschwand (AG), Obfelden
- Website: www.ottenbach.ch

Ottenbach is a municipality in the district of Affoltern in the canton of Zürich in Switzerland.

== History ==
Ottenbach is first mentioned in 831 as in loco vocato marcha Hotumbacharia. In 1169 it was mentioned as Arnoldus de Ottonbac. Since the end of the 18th century, the textile industry had expanded as a home industry (Putting-out system) in Ottenbach: In 1784, the cotton spinning mill employed 49% of the local population (430 people, 287 of whom worked all year round). At the beginning of the 19th century there were around 350 weaving looms and the Zurich Mechanical Silk Weaving Mill employed more than 200 people in Ottenbach from the village and the surrounding area.

== Geography ==
Aerial view by Walter Mittelholzer (1923)

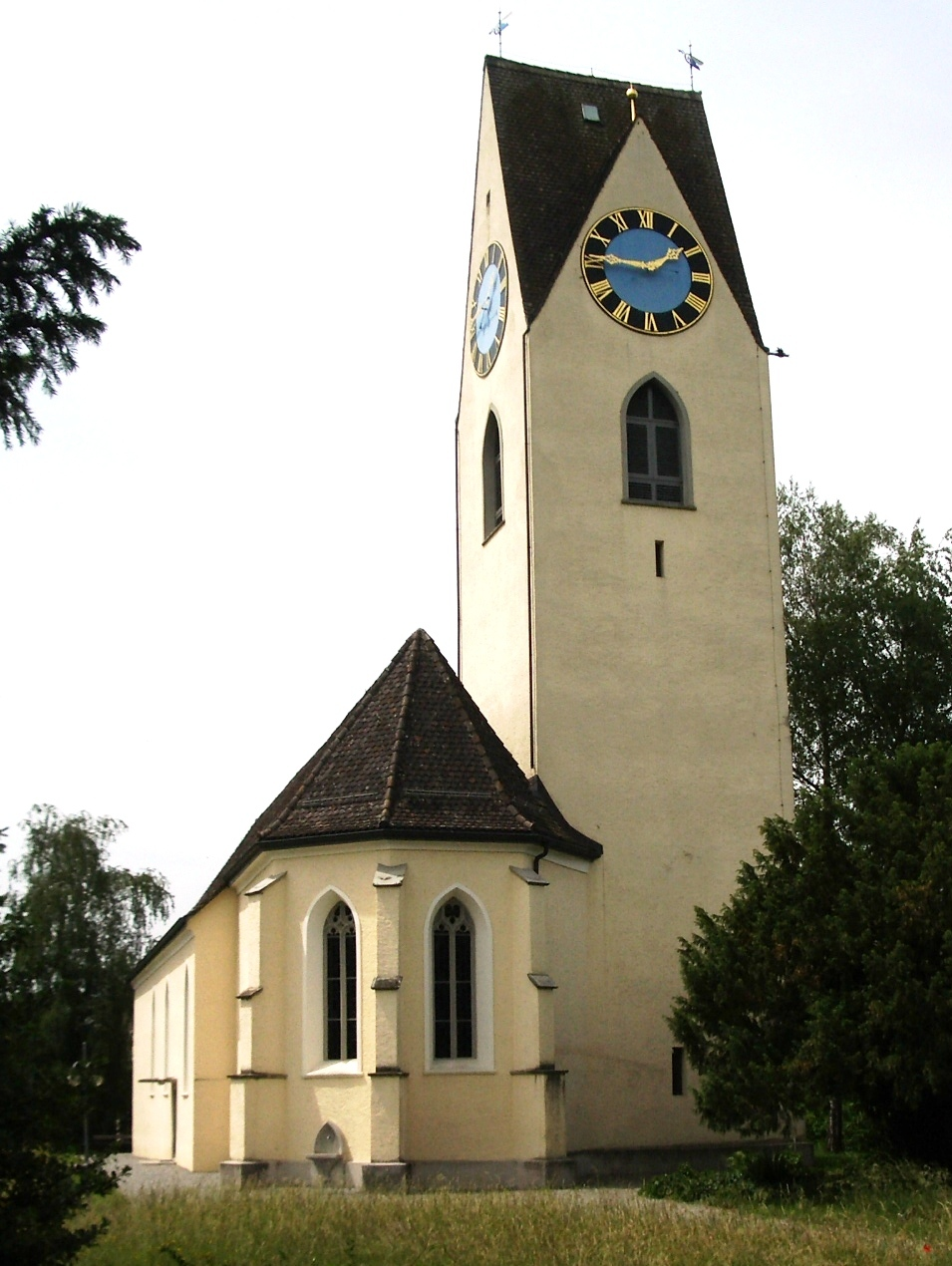
Protestant church

Ottenbach has an area of 5 km^{2} (1.9 sq mi). Of this area, 56.4% is used for agricultural purposes, while 20.7% is forested. Of the rest of the land, 19.1% is settled (buildings or roads) and the remainder (3.8%) is non-productive (rivers, glaciers or mountains).

It is located near the Reuss River on the border with the Canton of Aargau.

== Sights ==
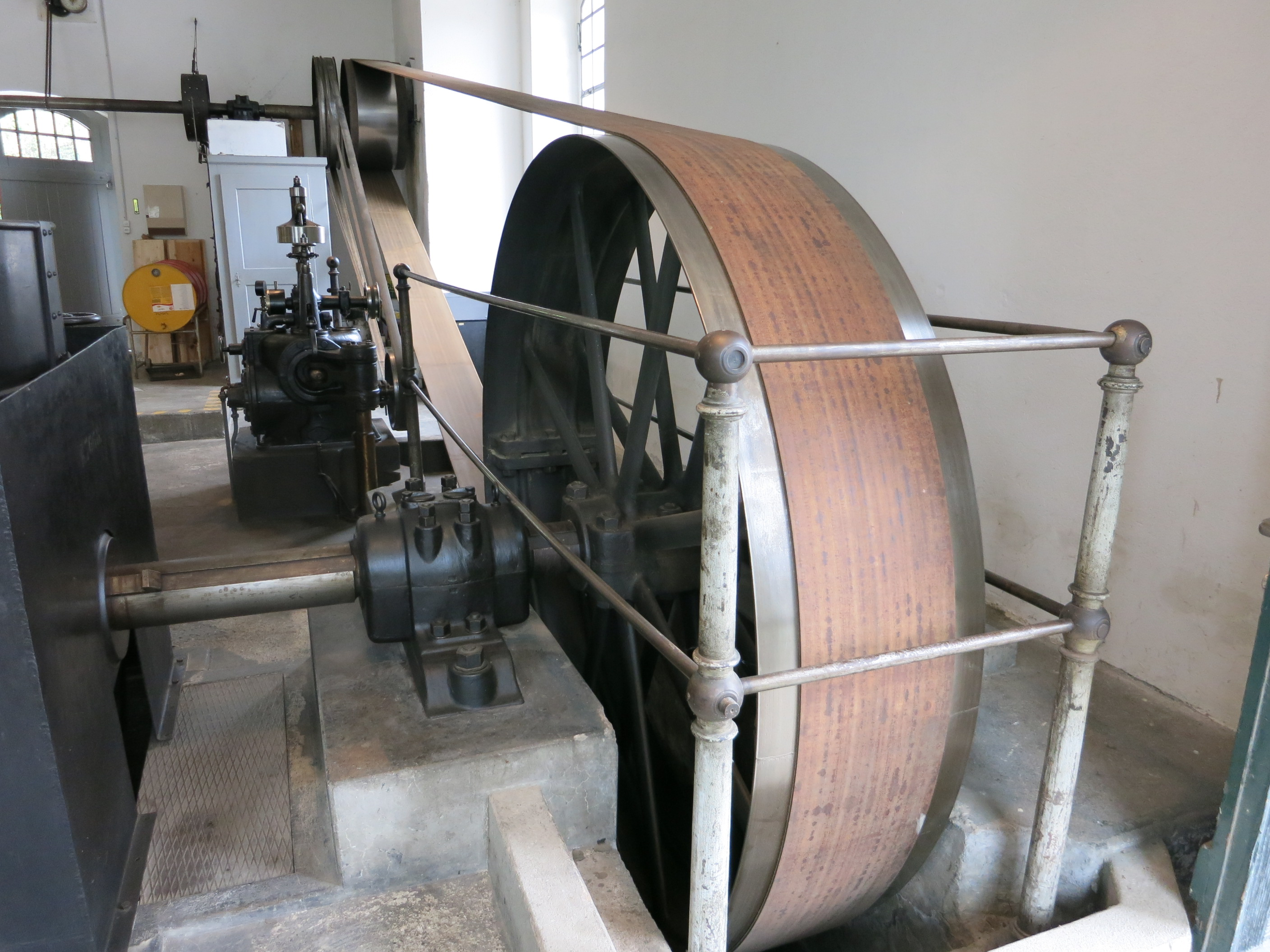
Interior of the historic powerhouse

Ottenbach owns the Ottenbach Small Hydro power plant with original equipment of 1920 which is still running for guided visits. It produced current for operating looms of the silk weaving factory A.F. Haas & Co. until 1975.

== Demographics ==
Ottenbach has a population (as of 31 December 2020) of 2,704. As of 2007, 7.3% of the population was made up of foreign nationals. Over the last 10 years the population has grown at a rate of 5.5%. Most of the population (as of 2000) speaks German (93.6%), with Italian being second most common ( 1.7%) and English being third ( 1.0%).

In the 2007 election the most popular party was the SVP which received 34.1% of the vote. The next three most popular parties were the SPS (20%), the FDP (15.5%) and the Green Party (11.2%).

The age distribution of the population (as of 2000) is children and teenagers (0–19 years old) make up 26.1% of the population, while adults (20–64 years old) make up 64.4% and seniors (over 64 years old) make up 9.6%. In Ottenbach about 84.9% of the population (between age 25-64) have completed either non-mandatory upper secondary education or additional higher education (either university or a Fachhochschule).

Ottenbach has an unemployment rate of 2.04%. As of 2005, there were 47 people employed in the primary economic sector and about 21 businesses involved in this sector. 144 people are employed in the secondary sector and there are 19 businesses in this sector. 388 people are employed in the tertiary sector, with 82 businesses in this sector. The historical population is given in the following table:

year	population
1467	22 Households
1650	320
1850	1,169
1900	1,107
1950	971
2000	2,164
