= Robert Stehli =

Swiss conductor

Robert Stehli (2 February 1930 – 3 April 2018) was a Swiss conductor.

== Life ==
Born in Zürich, Stehli received his musical education at the music academies of Zurich and Lübeck. In 1957, he founded the Hamburg Bach Orchestra, which he transformed into the Hamburger Sinfoniker after successful years with the fusion of two other orchestras. From 1965 to 1968, Stehli also held the position of second Kapellmeister of the Niedersächsisches Symphonie-Orchester in Hanover, which he also conducted with large symphony concerts on guest appearances outside Hanover.

Since 1968, Stehli managed the Hamburger Mozart-Orchester (today KlassikPhilharmonie Hamburg), with which he also distinguished himself internationally.

Stehli died at the age of 88.

== Awards ==
- 2003: Biermann-Ratjen-Medaille
- 2009: Kulturpreis des Kreises Pinneberg
- 2011: Order of Merit of the Federal Republic of Germany for his life achievement.

== Compositions ==
- Sommerkantate, Möseler, Wolfenbüttel 1956
- Drei Chöre, Tonger, Rodenkirchen/Rhein 1957
- Last night of the proms, Hamburger Mozart-Orchester, Hamburg 2003
- Hamburg proms last night, Klassik-Philharmonie, Hamburg 2003
- Eine kleine Nachtmusik, Bella Musica Tonträger, Bühl 1983
- Virtuose Trompeten-Konzerte, Deutsche Grammophon, Hamburg 1978
