= Sternenweiher =

- Location within Canton of Zurich Location within Canton of Schwyz Location within Switzerland Location within Alps
- Interactive map of Sternenweiher
- Location: Richterswil, Canton of Zurich
- Coordinates: 47°11′44″N 8°41′31″E
- Type: reservoir
- Catchment area: 4 km^{2} (1.5 sq mi)
- Basin countries: Switzerland
- Surface area: 2.7 ha (6.7 acres)
- Water volume: 0.1 million cubic metres (81 acre⋅ft)
- Surface elevation: 583 m (1,913 ft)

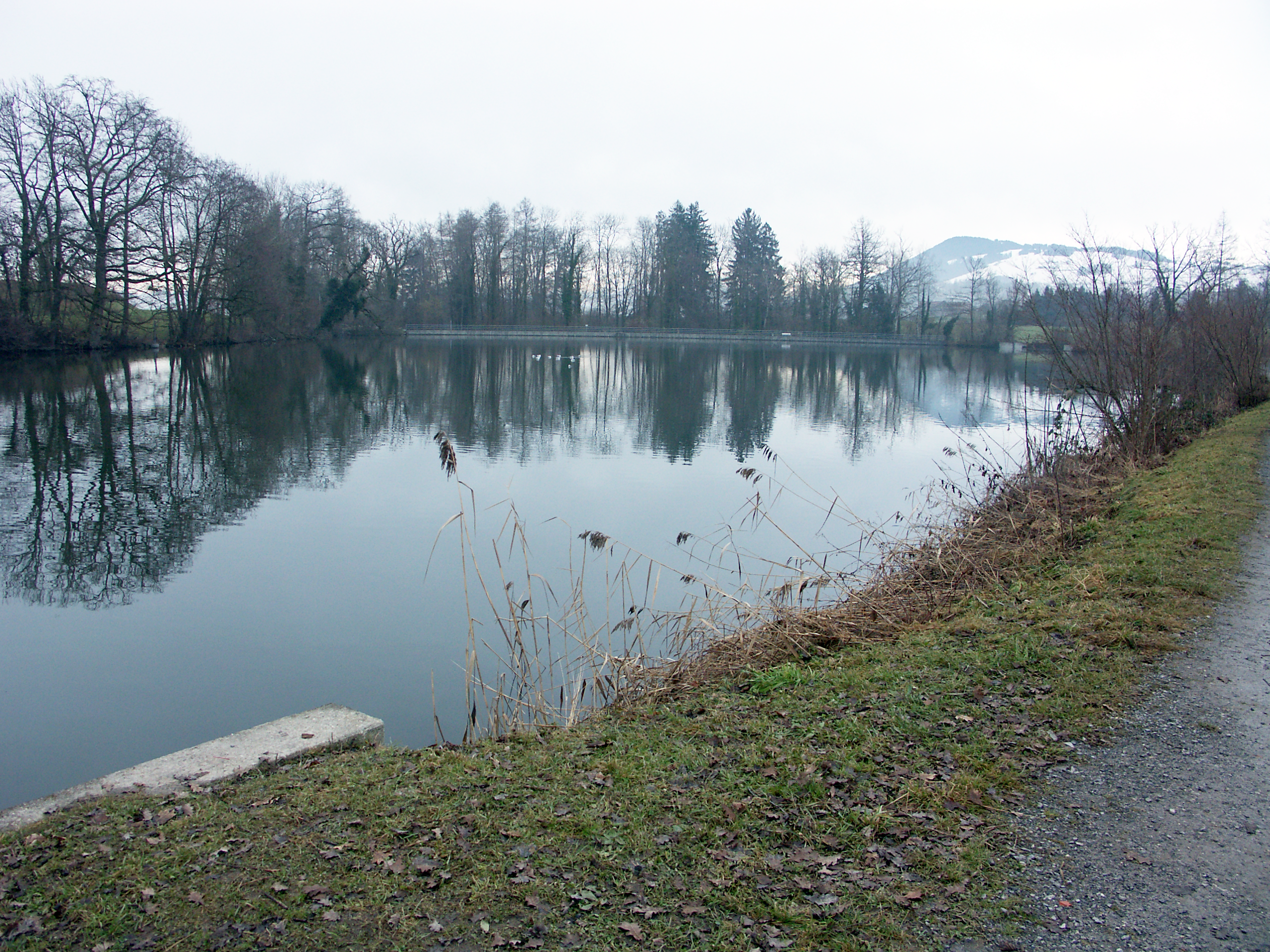
Richterswil Sternenweiher against the closing dam in the east

Sternenweiher is a lake in the municipality of Richterswil, Canton of Zurich, Switzerland. Its surface area is 2.7 ha (6.7 acres).
