= Goran Ivelja =

Croatian-Swiss footballer (born 1979)

Personal information
- Date of birth: 16 August 1979 (age 47)
- Place of birth: Schlieren, Switzerland
- Height: 1.90 m (6 ft 3 in)
- Position: Defender

Team information
- Current team: Grasshoppers U21 (manager)

Senior career*
Years	Team	Apps	(Gls)
1999–2000	Wil	12	(0)
2000–2001	FC Schaffhausen	20	(2)
2001–2003	FC Wohlen	45	(6)
2002	→ Concordia (loan)	11	(1)
2003–2004	HNK Cibalia	24	(2)
2004–2006	Wil	42	(5)
2006–2009	FC Winterthur	25	(0)
2008–2009	→ FC Schaffhausen (loan)	19	(0)
2009–2010	FC Schaffhausen	0	(0)
2012–2013	FC Dietikon	12	(0)

Managerial career
- 2010–2018: FC Dietikon
- 2013–2015: Team Aargau U18 (assistant)
- 2018–2019: Grasshoppers U18
- 2019–2020: Grasshoppers (assistant)
- 2020–: Grasshoppers U21
- * Club domestic league appearances and goals

Goran Ivelja (also spelled Ivelj; born 16 August 1979) is a Croatian-Swiss football coach and a former player. He is managing the Under-21 squad of Grasshoppers which plays in the Swiss 1. Liga.

== Career ==
Ivelja signed for HNK Cibalia in July 2003 he was signed for FC Winterthur on 9 July 2006.
