= Oetwil =

Oetwil may refer to:

- Oetwil am See, Switzerland
- Oetwil an der Limmat, Switzerland
