= Weiningen =

- Municipality
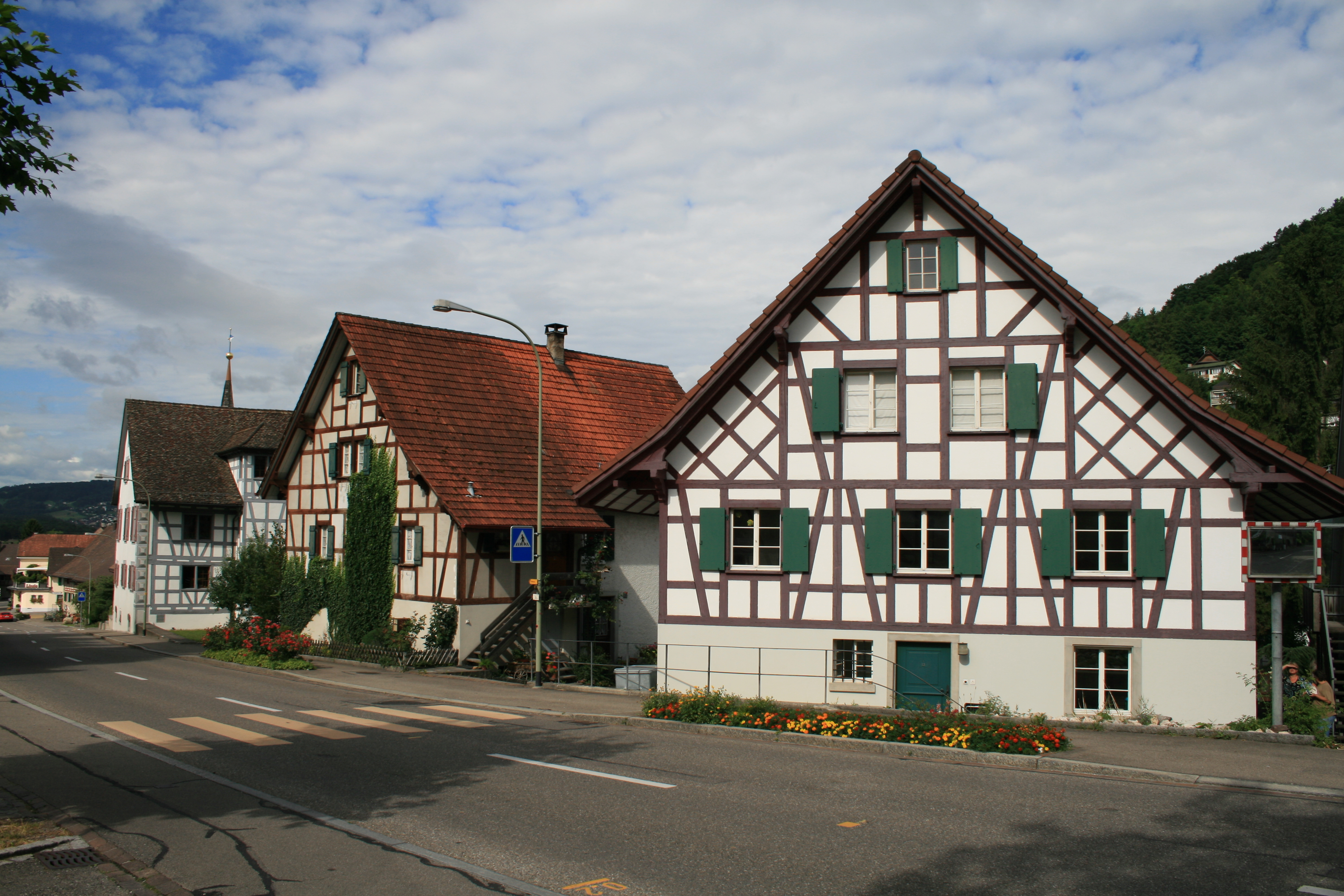

- Flag Coat of arms
- Location of Weiningen
- Location within Switzerland Location within Canton of Zurich
- Coordinates: 47°25′N 8°26′E
- Country: Switzerland
- Canton: Zurich
- District: Dietikon

Area
  - Total: 5.41 km^{2} (2.09 sq mi)
- Elevation: 413 m (1,355 ft)

Population (December 2020)
  - Total: 4,869
  - Density: 900/km^{2} (2,330/sq mi)
- Time zone: UTC+01:00 (CET)
  - Summer (DST): UTC+02:00 (CEST)
- Postal code: 8104
- SFOS number: 251
- ISO 3166 code: CH-ZH
- Surrounded by: Dällikon, Dietikon, Geroldswil, Oetwil an der Limmat, Regensdorf, Unterengstringen
- Website: www.weiningen.ch

Weiningen is a municipality in the district of Dietikon in the canton of Zürich in Switzerland. It is located in the Limmat Valley (German: Limmattal).

The municipality was first mentioned in 870 as Winingon.

== Geography ==
Aerial view from 600 m by Walter Mittelholzer (1919)

Weiningen has an area of 5.4 km^{2} (2.1 sq mi). Of this area, 32.5% is used for agricultural purposes, while 38% is forested. Of the rest of the land, 28.8% is settled (buildings or roads) and the remainder (0.7%) is non-productive (rivers, glaciers or mountains). In 1996 housing and buildings made up 17.2% of the total area, while transportation infrastructure made up the rest (11.5%). Of the total unproductive area, water (streams and lakes) made up 0.2% of the area. As of 2007 17.2% of the total municipal area was undergoing some type of construction.

== Demographics ==
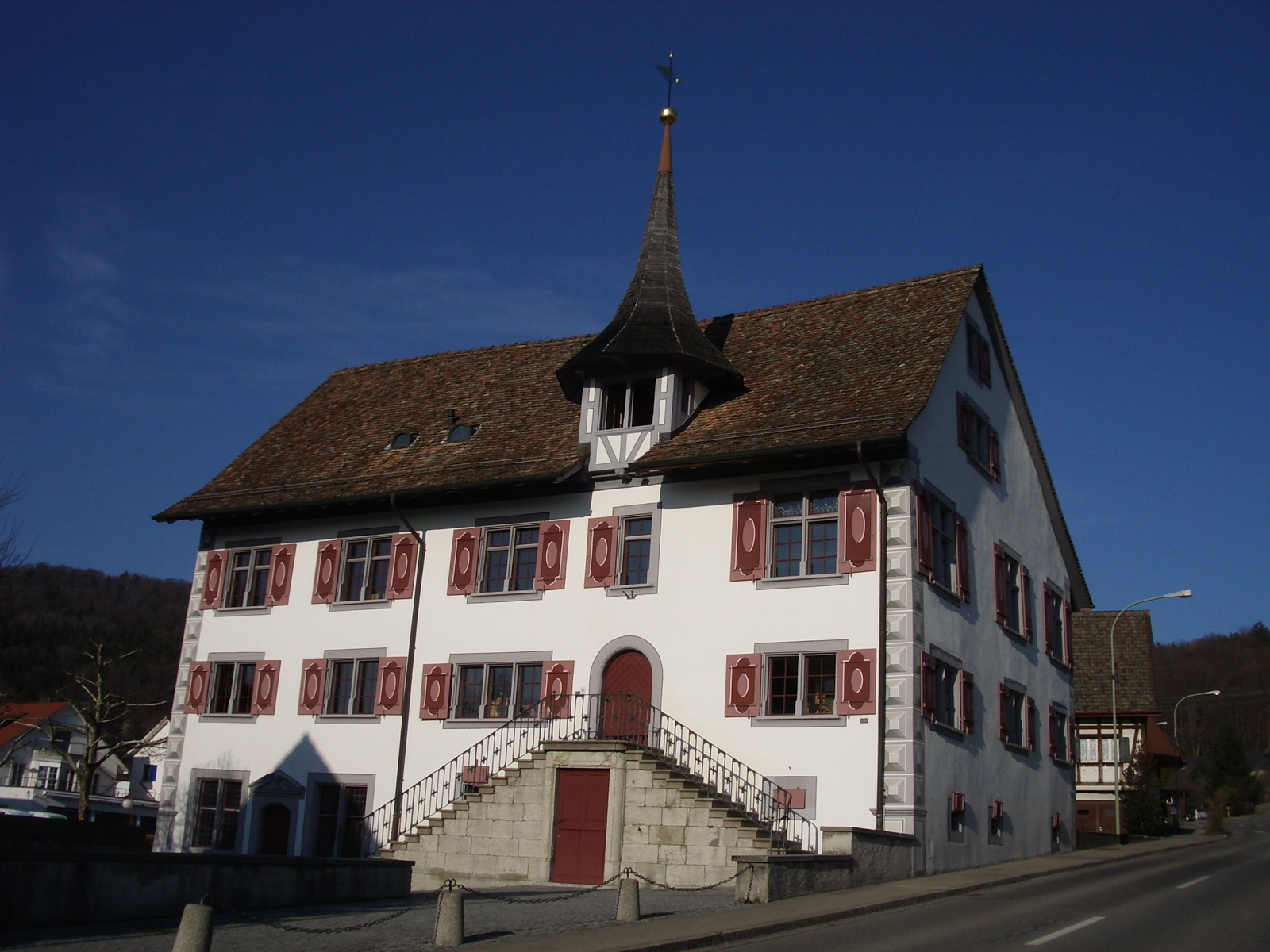
Castle Weiningen

Weiningen has a population (as of 31 December 2020) of 4,869. As of 2007, 24.1% of the population was made up of foreign nationals. As of 2008 the gender distribution of the population was 51% male and 49% female. Over the last 10 years the population has grown at a rate of 13.8%. Most of the population (as of 2000) speaks German (85.8%), with Italian being second most common (3.9%) and Albanian being third (2.6%).

In the 2007 election the most popular party was the SVP which received 42.7% of the vote. The next three most popular parties were the SPS (15.5%), the FDP (15.1%) and the CSP (9.3%).

The age distribution of the population (as of 2000) is children and teenagers (0–19 years old) make up 23.1% of the population, while adults (20–64 years old) make up 65% and seniors (over 64 years old) make up 11.9%. In Weiningen about 76.7% of the population (between age 25-64) have completed either non-mandatory upper secondary education or additional higher education (either university or a Fachhochschule). There are 1623 households in Weiningen.

Weiningen has an unemployment rate of 2.96%. As of 2005, there were 59 people employed in the primary economic sector and about 19 businesses involved in this sector. 396 people are employed in the secondary sector and there are 40 businesses in this sector. 636 people are employed in the tertiary sector, with 116 businesses in this sector. As of 2007 44.4% of the working population were employed full-time, and 55.6% were employed part-time.

As of 2008 there were 1345 Catholics and 1406 Protestants in Weiningen. In the 2000 census, religion was broken down into several smaller categories. From the 2000 census, 42.2% were some type of Protestant, with 40.5% belonging to the Swiss Reformed Church and 1.7% belonging to other Protestant churches. 32% of the population were Catholic. Of the rest of the population, 0% were Muslim, 10.7% belonged to another religion (not listed), 3.3% did not give a religion, and 11.1% were atheist or agnostic.

=== Historic population ===
The historic population of the municipality is described by the following graph:

== Transport ==
From 1901 to 1931, Weiningen was served by a branch of the Limmattal tramway with service to Schlieren and connections to Zürich. Today it is served by bus routes 302 and 304, which provide links to Altstetten, Dietikon and Schlieren. The nearest railway stations are Schlieren and Dietikon.
