= Dietikon District =

Coordinates: 47°23′N 8°25′E

Dietikon District Bezirk Dietikon
- District
- Flag Coat of arms
- Country: Switzerland
- Canton: Zürich
- Capital: Dietikon

Area
  - Total: 60.06 km^{2} (23.19 sq mi)

Population (31 December 2020)
  - Total: 94,533
  - Density: 1,574/km^{2} (4,077/sq mi)
- Time zone: UTC+1 (CET)
  - Summer (DST): UTC+2 (CEST)
- Municipalities: 11

Dietikon District is a district of the Swiss canton of Zürich. The capital of the district of Dietikon is the city of Dietikon, located in the Limmat Valley (German: Limmattal).

Dietikon District was created in 1989 by splitting the former Zürich District into three parts. The western part became the Dietikon District, the eastern part became the district (respectively city) of Zürich and the municipality of Zollikon (located east of Zürich) was integrated into the Meilen District.

Municipality	Population (31 December 2020)	Area, km^{2}
Aesch	1,709	5.24
Birmensdorf	6,909	11.38
Dietikon	28,057	9.33
Geroldswil	5,046	1.91
Oberengstringen	6,721	2.13
Oetwil an der Limmat	2,529	2.76
Schlieren	19,881	6.38
Uitikon	4,809	2.38
Unterengstringen	3,984	3.32
Urdorf	10,019	7.62
Weiningen	4,869	5.41
Total	94,533	60.06

== See also ==
- Municipalities of the canton of Zürich
