= Unterengstringen =

- Municipality
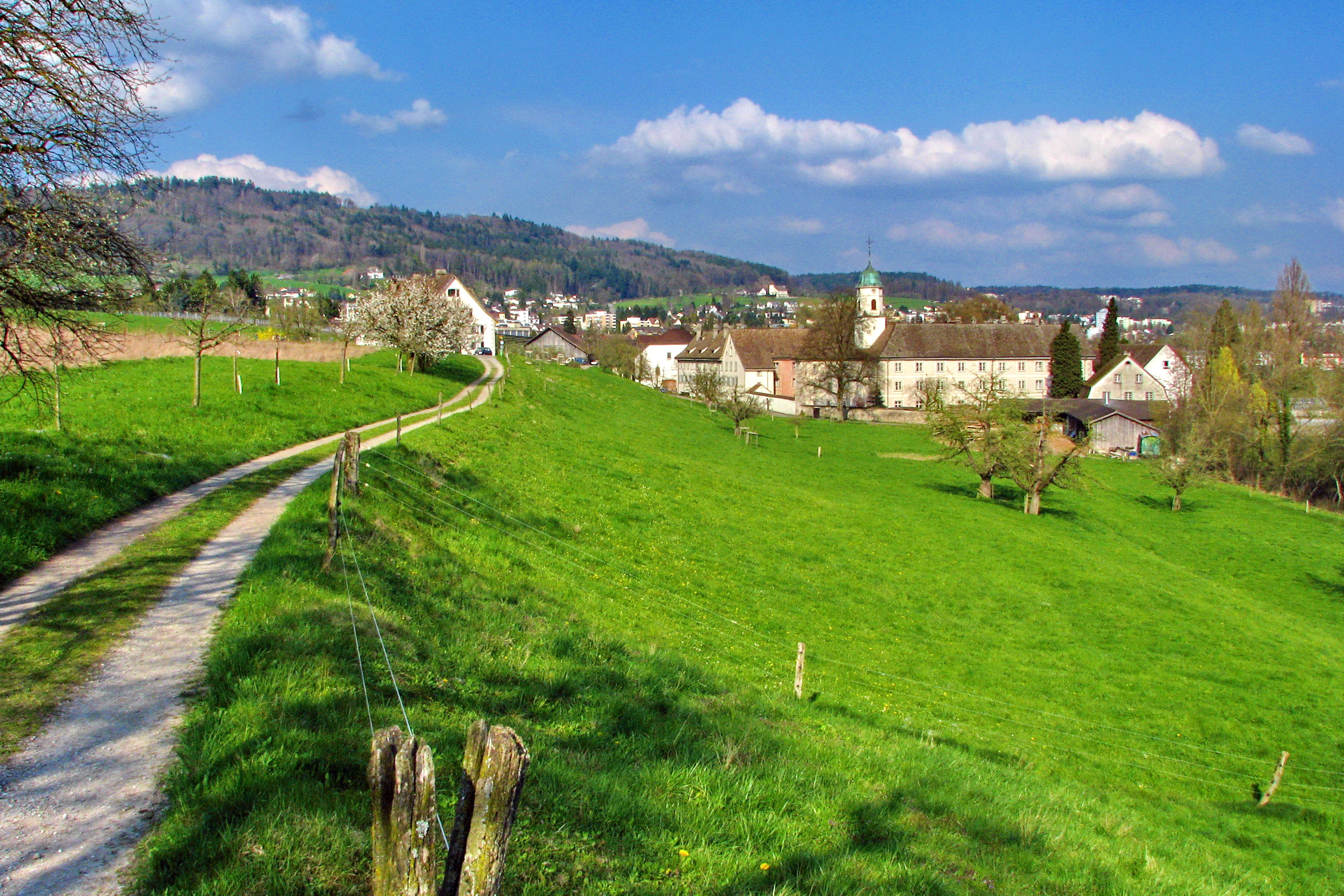

- Flag Coat of arms
- Location of Unterengstringen
- Location within Switzerland Location within Canton of Zurich
- Coordinates: 47°25′N 8°27′E
- Country: Switzerland
- Canton: Zurich
- District: Dietikon

Area
  - Total: 3.32 km^{2} (1.28 sq mi)
- Elevation: 416 m (1,365 ft)

Population (December 2020)
  - Total: 3,984
  - Density: 1,200/km^{2} (3,110/sq mi)
- Time zone: UTC+01:00 (CET)
  - Summer (DST): UTC+02:00 (CEST)
- Postal code: 8103
- SFOS number: 249
- ISO 3166 code: CH-ZH
- Surrounded by: Dietikon, Oberengstringen, Regensdorf, Schlieren, Weiningen
- Website: www.unterengstringen.ch

Unterengstringen is a municipality in the district of Dietikon in the canton of Zürich in Switzerland, located in the Limmat Valley (German: Limmattal).

== Geography ==
Unterengstringen has an area of 3.3 km^{2} (1.3 sq mi). Of this area, 36.5% is used for agricultural purposes, while 26.9% is forested. Of the rest of the land, 33.2% is settled (buildings or roads) and the remainder (3.3%) is non-productive (rivers, glaciers or mountains). In 1996 housing and buildings made up 21.4% of the total area, while transportation infrastructure made up the rest (11.4%). Of the total unproductive area, water (streams and lakes) made up 3% of the area. As of 2007 29.3% of the total municipal area was undergoing some type of construction.

The Ruine Glanzenberg is a ruined castle in the municipality, which is a Swiss heritage site of national significance.

Aerial view by Walter Mittelholzer (1919)

== Demographics ==
Unterengstringen has a population (as of 31 December 2020) of 3,984. As of 2007, 19.7% of the population was made up of foreign nationals. As of 2008 the gender distribution of the population was 49.7% male and 50.3% female. Over the last 10 years the population has grown at a rate of 12%. Most of the population (as of 2000) speaks German (87.4%), with Italian being second most common ( 3.0%) and French being third ( 1.6%).

In the 2007 election the most popular party was the SVP which received 45.3% of the vote. The next three most popular parties were the FDP (21.6%), the SPS (11.2%) and the CVP (7.5%).

The age distribution of the population (as of 2000) is children and teenagers (0–19 years old) make up 19.2% of the population, while adults (20–64 years old) make up 67.3% and seniors (over 64 years old) make up 13.5%. In Unterengstringen about 79.5% of the population (between age 25-64) have completed either non-mandatory upper secondary education or additional higher education (either university or a Fachhochschule). There are 1301 households in Unterengstringen.

Unterengstringen has an unemployment rate of 2.45%. As of 2005, there were 30 people employed in the primary economic sector and about 4 businesses involved in this sector. 155 people are employed in the secondary sector and there are 32 businesses in this sector. 467 people are employed in the tertiary sector, with 100 businesses in this sector. As of 2007 93.6% of the working population were employed full-time, and 6.4% were employed part-time.

As of 2008 there were 962 Catholics and 1101 Protestants in Unterengstringen. In the 2000 census, religion was broken down into several smaller categories. From the 2000 census, 42.4% were some type of Protestant, with 40.9% belonging to the Swiss Reformed Church and 1.5% belonging to other Protestant churches. 35.3% of the population were Catholic. Of the rest of the population, 0% were Muslim, 5.6% belonged to another religion (not listed), 3.3% did not give a religion, and 12.9% were atheist or agnostic.
