= Limmattaler Zeitung =

- Type: Daily newspaper
- Owner: AZ Medien
- Editor-in-chief: Bettina Hamilton-Irvine
- Founded: • 1972 as Der Limmattaler • 1997 (name changed to Limmattaler Tagblatt) • 2008 (name changed to Limmattaler Zeitung)
- Language: German
- Headquarters: Dietikon
- Country: Switzerland
- Circulation: 8,359 (as of October 2013)
- Website: limmattalerzeitung.ch

Limmattaler Zeitung, commonly shortened to Limmattaler, is a Swiss German-language daily newspaper, published in Dietikon in the Limmat Valley.

== History and profile ==
The newspaper was first published in 1972 as Limmattaler Tagblatt by Der Limmattaler AG , situated in Dietikon, Canton of Zürich. The current name Limmattaler Zeitung dates from a 2008 merger with the local newspaper Bezirksanzeiger Dietikon. In 2010 the company was bought and absorbed by regional Swiss media conglomerate AZ Medien.

== See also ==
- Limmat Valley
