= Aesch, Zürich =

Aesch
- Municipality
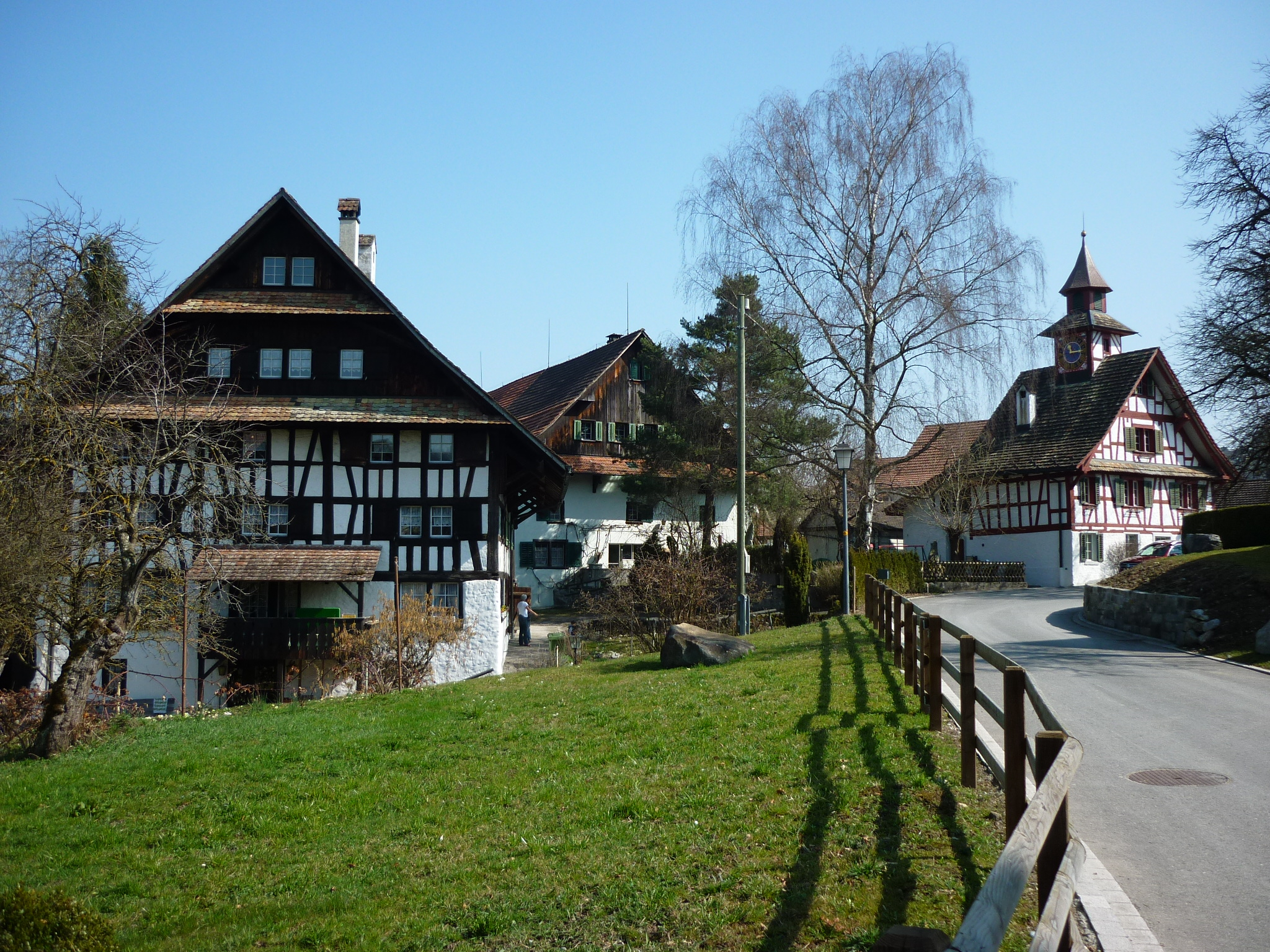

- Flag Coat of arms
- Location of Aesch
- Location within Switzerland Location within Canton of Zurich
- Coordinates: 47°20′N 8°26′E
- Country: Switzerland
- Canton: Zurich
- District: Dietikon

Area
  - Total: 5.24 km^{2} (2.02 sq mi)
- Elevation: 540 m (1,770 ft)

Population (December 2020)
  - Total: 1,709
  - Density: 326/km^{2} (845/sq mi)
- Time zone: UTC+01:00 (CET)
  - Summer (DST): UTC+02:00 (CEST)
- Postal code: 8904
- SFOS number: 241
- ISO 3166 code: CH-ZH
- Surrounded by: Arni (AG), Birmensdorf, Bonstetten, Islisberg (AG), Oberwil-Lieli (AG), Wettswil am Albis
- Website: www.aesch-zh.ch

Aesch is a municipality in the district of Dietikon in the canton of Zürich in Switzerland. Until 2001 it was known as Aesch bei Birmensdorf.

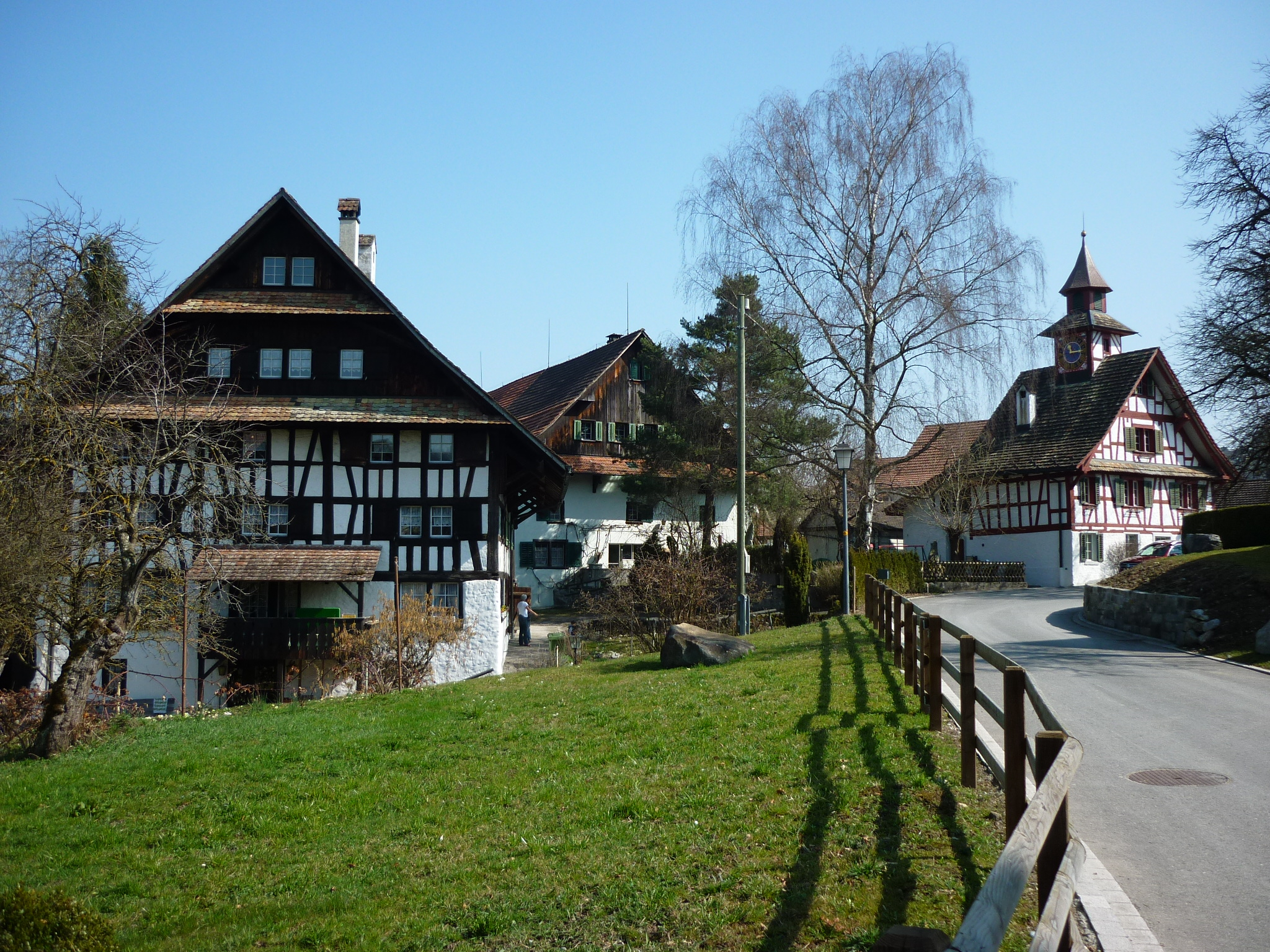
Historic house

== History ==
Signs of Roman settlement have been found east of the present village. The community was first mentioned in the year 1124. At that time, the landowner in Aesch was Engelberg Abbey. With the conquest of Aargau Aesch came under the rule of Zürich, where it remained until the Helvetic Republic. Between 1798 and 1803 it was incorporated into the Bezirk Mettmenstetten. Until the Second World War, Aesch was purely a farming community. From 1942 to 1946 a labor camp with internees and emigrants was located in Aesch, who undertook forest clearance in the Reuetal and Stierenwald. In 1963 construction of the planned communities of Brunn- und Grossacher began, which set in motion the transition to a centralized community.

Aesch is first mentioned in 1184 as Asche. After the 15th Century it was often mentioned as Esch ennend Albis.

== Geography ==
Aesch has an area of 5.2 km^{2} (2.0 sq mi). Of this area, 57.7% is used for agricultural purposes, while 33.3% is forested. The rest of the land, (9%) is settled.

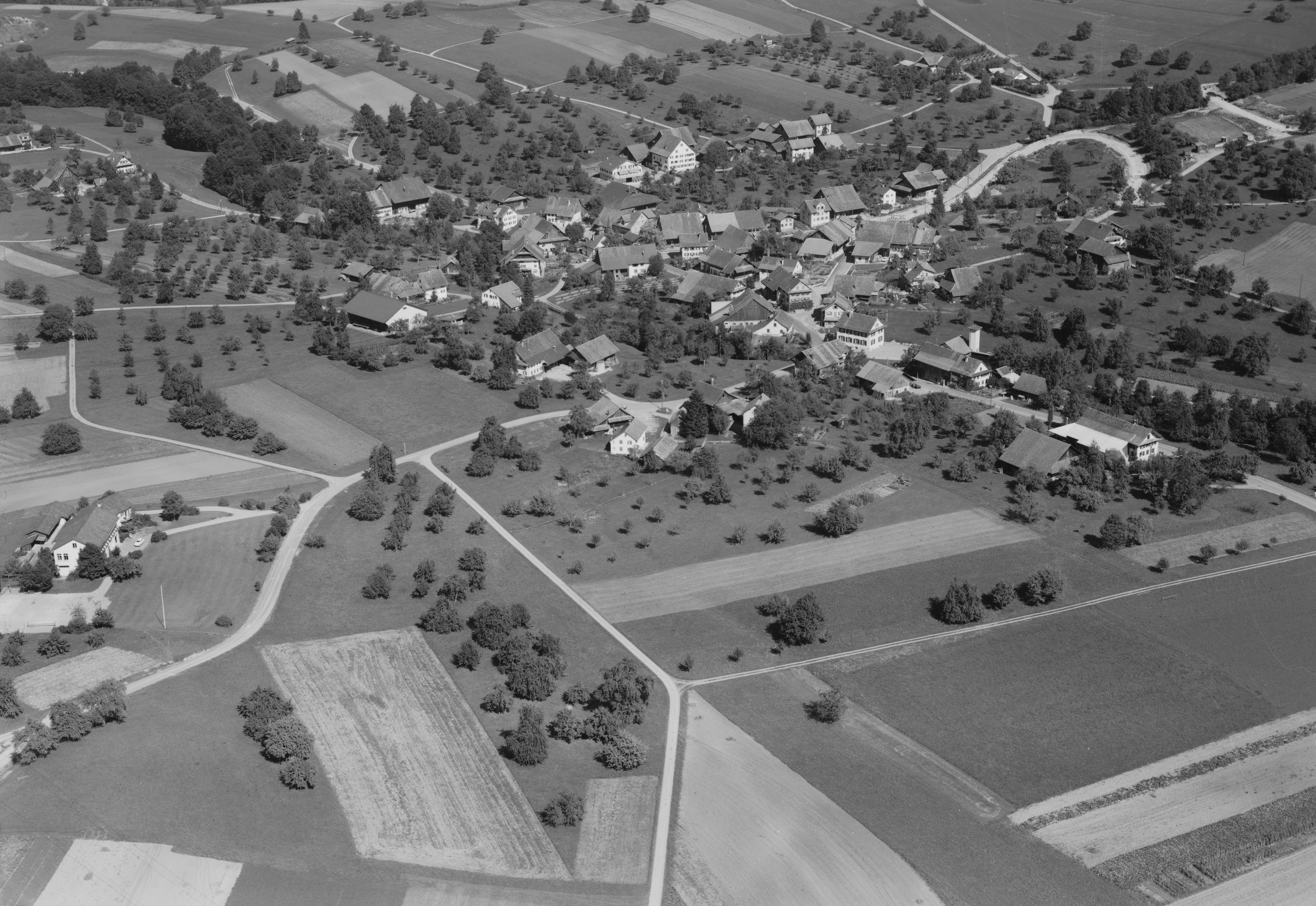
Aerial view (1964)

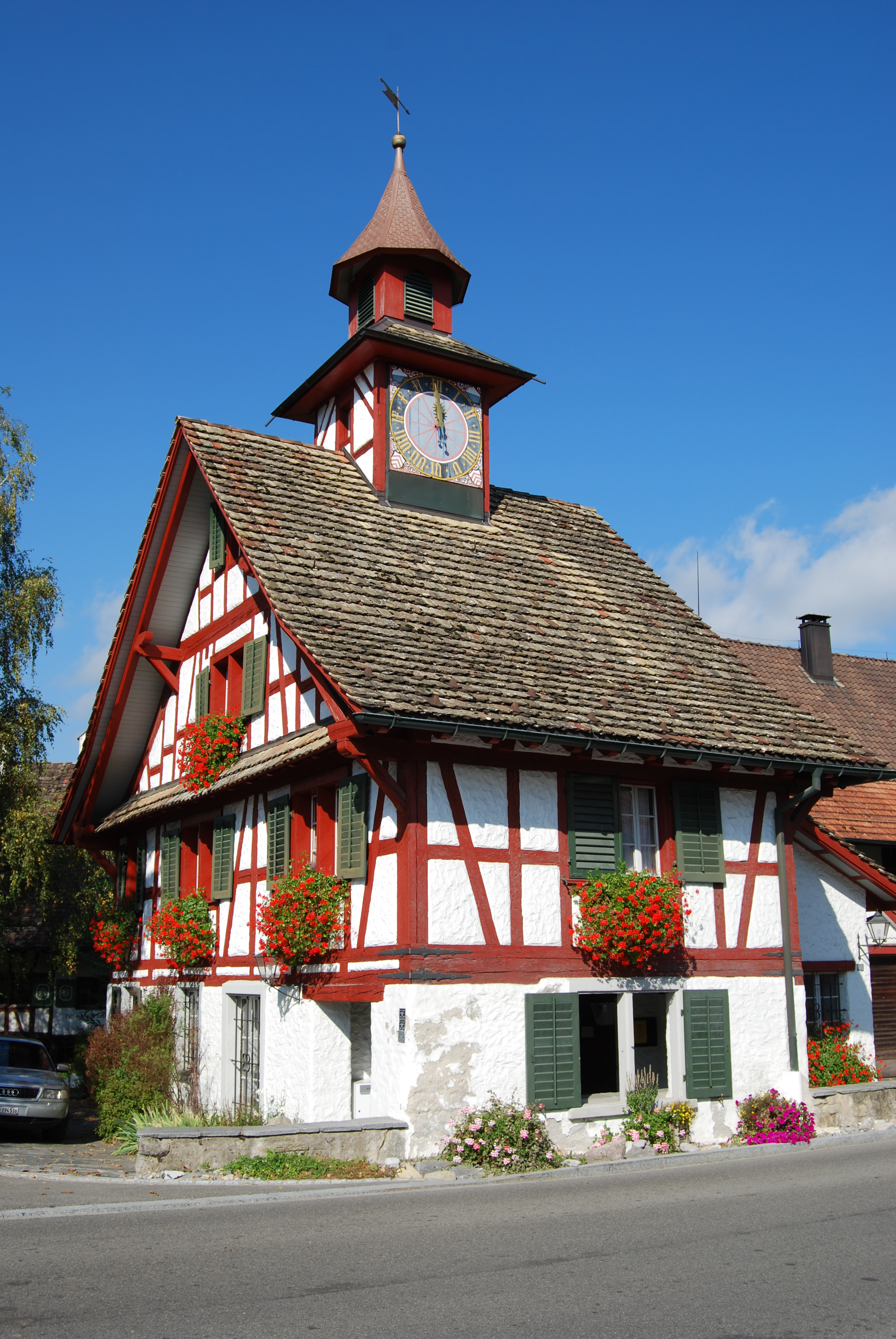
Tower house

== Demographics ==
Aesch has a population (as of 31 December 2020) of 1,709. As of 2007, 7.2% of the population was made up of foreign nationals. Over the last 10 years the population has grown at a rate of 3.1%. Most of the population (as of 2000) speaks German (93.1%), with English being second most common ( 2.0%) and Italian being third ( 1.3%).

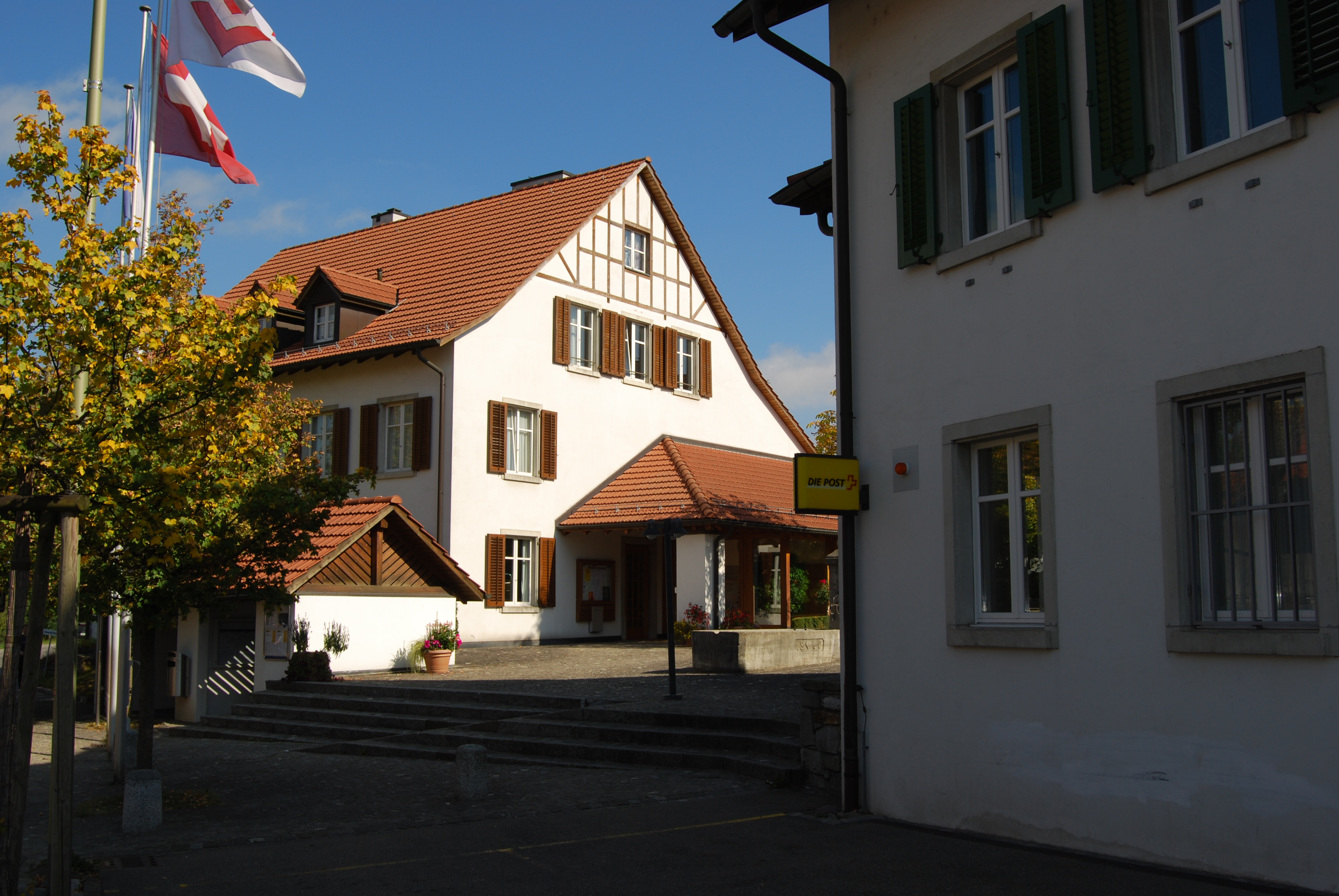
Municipal Administration and Post Office

In the 2007 election the most popular party was the SVP which received 46% of the vote. The next three most popular parties were the FDP (15.7%), the SPS (11.8%) and the CVP (9.4%).

The age distribution of the population (as of 2000) is children and teenagers (0–19 years old) make up 20.9% of the population, while adults (20–64 years old) make up 67.8% and seniors (over 64 years old) make up 11.3%. In Aesch about 88.2% of the population (between age 25-64) have completed either non-mandatory upper secondary education or additional higher education (either university or a Fachhochschule).

Aesch has an unemployment rate of 1.47%. As of 2005, there were 58 people employed in the primary economic sector and about 23 businesses involved in this sector. 51 people are employed in the secondary sector and there are 5 businesses in this sector. 229 people are employed in the tertiary sector, with 42 businesses in this sector. As of 2007 34% of the working population is employed full-time, and 66% is employed part-time.

As of 2008 there were 259 Catholics and 522 Protestants in Aesch. In the 2000 census religion was broken down into several smaller categories. From the 2000 census, 57.4% was some type of Protestant, with 56% belonging to the Swiss Reformed Church and 1.4% belonging to other Protestant churches. 27.2% of the population are Catholic. Of the rest of the population, 0% is Muslim, 1.6% belong to another religion, 0.6% did not give a religion, and 13.2% is atheist or agnostic.

The historical population is given in the following table:

year	population
1467	7 Households
1634	234
1850	442
1900	288
1970	472
2000	950
