= Kevin Iodice =

Swiss footballer (born 2001)

Personal information
- Date of birth: 12 January 2001 (age 25)
- Place of birth: Schlieren, Switzerland
- Height: 1.83 m (6 ft 0 in)
- Position: Defender

Team information
- Current team: Baden
- Number: 13

Youth career
- 2017–2020: Grasshoppers

Senior career*
| Years | Team | Apps | (Gls) |
| 2018–2020 | Grasshoppers II | 15 | (1) |
| 2020–2021 | Grasshoppers | 2 | (0) |
| 2021–2023 | Vaduz | 24 | (0) |
| 2023 | Cosmos | 0 | (0) |
| 2023–2024 | Sammaurese Calcio | 11 | (0) |
| 2024 | Schaffhausen | 0 | (0) |
| 2024– | Baden | 24 | (0) |
- * Club domestic league appearances and goals as of 22 June 2025

Kevin Iodice (born 12 January 2001) is a Swiss footballer who plays as a defender for Swiss Promotion League club Baden.

== Career ==
=== Grasshoppers ===
Iodice was part of the Grasshoppers youth system, playing for their U16, U18 and U19 youth squads during his tenure with the club from 2017 to 2021. During this time he played for Grasshoppers II in the lower Swiss leagues.

Iodice made his senior debut for Grasshopper Club Zürich on 30 July 2020 in a Swiss Super League game against FC Aarau.

=== Vaduz ===
On 28 January 2021, Iodice was transferred to Vaduz. His contract was signed to run until Summer 2023. During the 2021–22 season, he made 17 appearances in the Swiss Challenge League and two appearances in the FL Cup. Across both competitions, he collected 8 yellow cards.

=== Schaffhausen ===
After a spell in Italy with Sammaurese, on 13 January 2024 he joined Swiss side Schaffhausen.
