= Geroldswil =

- Municipality
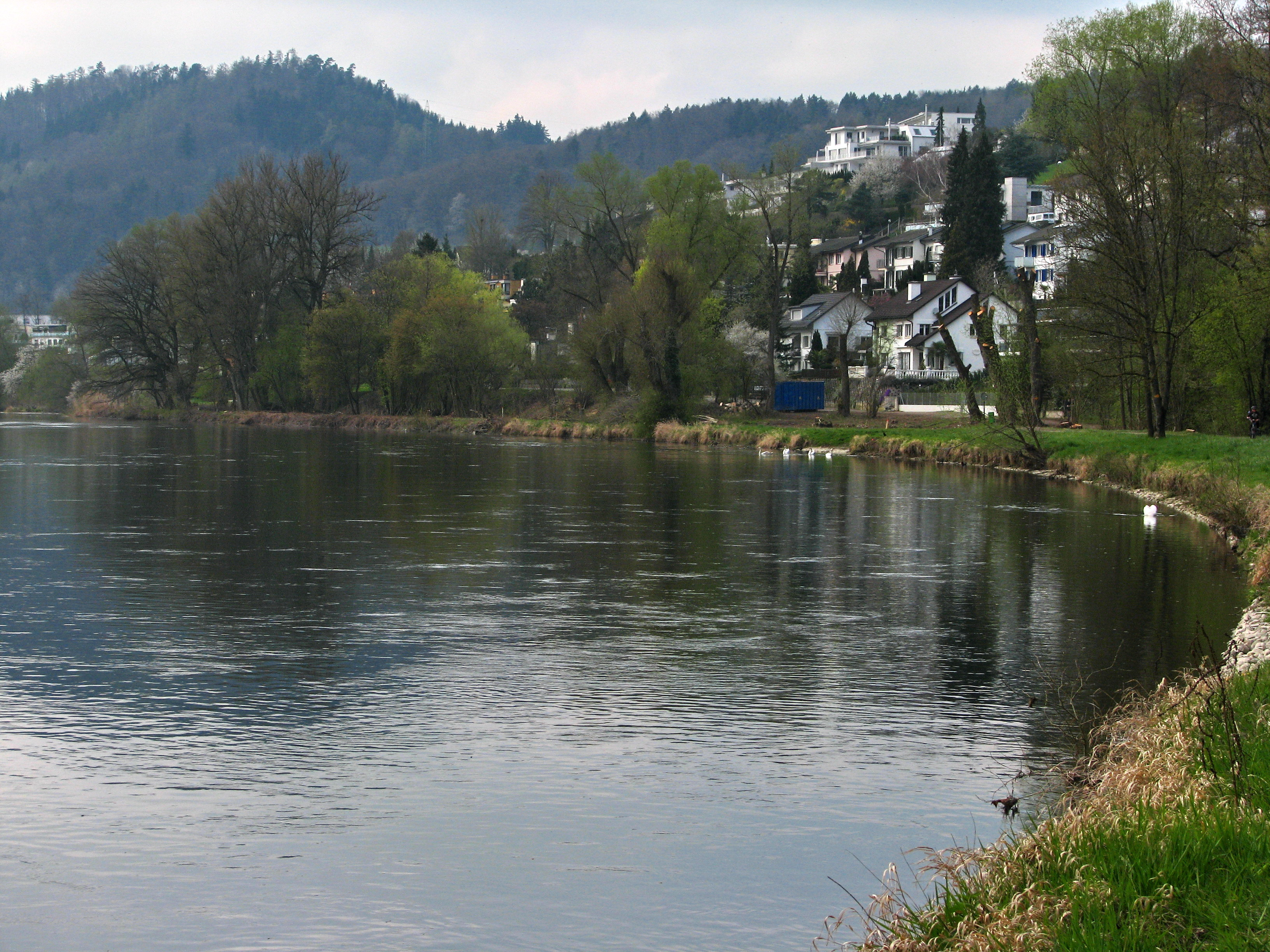

- Flag Coat of arms
- Location of Geroldswil
- Location within Switzerland Location within Canton of Zurich
- Coordinates: 47°25′N 8°25′E
- Country: Switzerland
- Canton: Zurich
- District: Dietikon

Area
  - Total: 1.91 km^{2} (0.74 sq mi)
- Elevation: 395 m (1,296 ft)

Population (December 2020)
  - Total: 5,046
  - Density: 2,640/km^{2} (6,840/sq mi)
- Time zone: UTC+01:00 (CET)
  - Summer (DST): UTC+02:00 (CEST)
- Postal code: 8954
- SFOS number: 244
- ISO 3166 code: CH-ZH
- Surrounded by: Dietikon, Oetwil an der Limmat, Weiningen
- Website: www.geroldswil.ch

Geroldswil is a municipality in the district of Dietikon in the canton of Zürich in Switzerland, located in the Limmat Valley.

== History ==
Geroldswil is first mentioned in 1255 as Geroltzwiler.

== Geography ==
Geroldswil has an area of 1.9 km^{2} (0.73 sq mi). Of this area, 27% is used for agricultural purposes, while 24.3% is forested. Of the rest of the land, 42.9% is settled (buildings or roads) and the remainder (5.8%) is non-productive (rivers, glaciers or mountains). In 1996 housing and buildings made up 36.1% of the total area, while transportation infrastructure made up the rest (7.9%). Of the total unproductive area, water (streams and lakes) made up 3.1% of the area. As of 2007 43.8% of the total municipal area was undergoing some type of construction.

Originally a linear village (Strassendorf) in the Limmattal, in the second half of the 20th century, Geroldswil has grown into a suburban extension of the agglomeration of Zürich.

== Demographics ==
Geroldswil has a population (as of 31 December 2020) of 5,046. As of 2007, the gender distribution of the population was 50.2% male and 49.8% female. As of 2019, 26.72% of the population was made up of foreign nationals. Over the last 10 years the population has decreased at a rate of -3.9%. Most of the population (as of 2000) speaks German (89.8%), with Italian being second most common ( 2.9%) and Serbo-Croatian being third ( 0.9%).

In the 2007 election the most popular party was the SVP which received 44.3% of the vote. The next three most popular parties were the FDP (17.4%), the SPS (12.7%) and the CVP (11.7%).

The age distribution of the population (as of 2000) is that children and teenagers (0–19 years old) make up 22.2% of the population, while adults (20–64 years old) make up 66.9% and seniors (over 64 years old) make up 10.9%. The entire Swiss population is generally well educated. In Geroldswil about 78.6% of the population (between age 25-64) have completed either non-mandatory upper secondary education or additional higher education (either university or a Fachhochschule). There are 2011 households in Geroldswil.

Geroldswil has an unemployment rate of 2.5% as of 2018. As of 2005, there were 9 people employed in the primary economic sector and about 4 businesses involved in this sector. 450 people are employed in the secondary sector and there are 37 businesses in this sector. 1400 people are employed in the tertiary sector, with 187 businesses in this sector. As of 2007 75% of the working population were employed full-time, and 25% were employed part-time.

As of 2008 there were 1660 Catholics and 1537 Protestants in Geroldswil. In the 2000 census, religion was broken down into several smaller categories. From the 2000 census, 41.9% were some type of Protestant, with 40.3% belonging to the Swiss Reformed Church and 1.6% belonging to other Protestant churches. 36.4% of the population were Catholic. Of the rest of the population, 0% were Muslim, 4.8% belonged to another religion (not listed), 2.7% did not give a religion, and 13.5% were atheist or agnostic.

The historical population is given in the following table:

year	population
1467	3 Households
1634	56
1799	137
1850	194
1900	141
1950	441
1960	844
1970	2,818
2000	4,540

== Notable people ==
- Daniel Jositsch, law professor and Sozialdemokratische Partei der Schweiz (SP) politician.

== Culture ==
The Geroldswil library is located beside the village square. It serves the population and the school as a place for information, encounters, education, culture, leisure, and entertainment, offering a wide range of current media for children, young people, and adults. The cultural association Spektrum Geroldswil was dissolved in 2015 after 42 years by a majority decision.
