= Limmat Valley =

River valley in Switzerland

Coordinates: 47°30′N 8°15′E

The Limmat Valley (German: Limmattal) is a river valley and a region in the cantons of Zürich and Aargau in Switzerland.

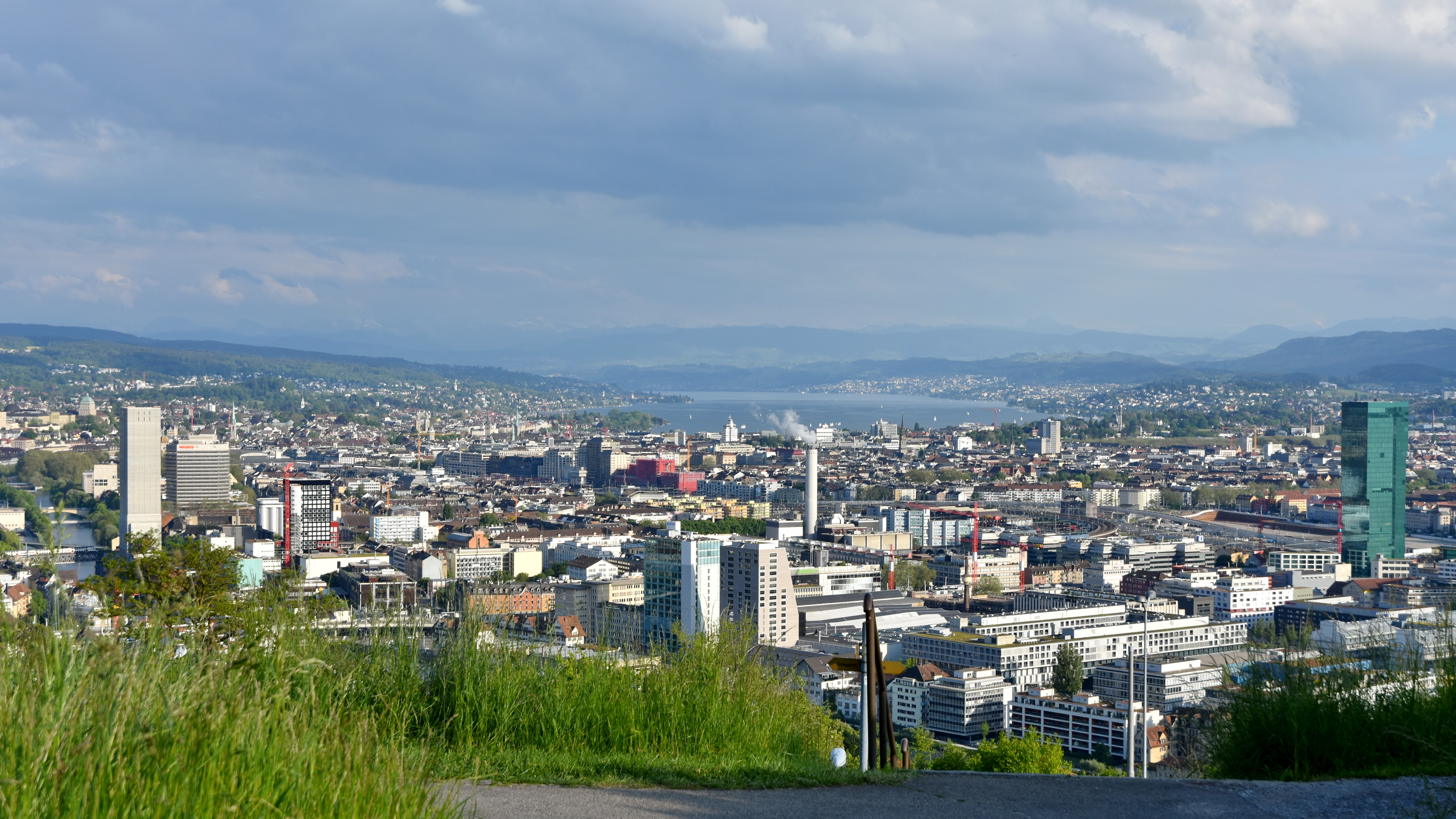
View from the Käferberg hill in Zürich on the upper Limmat Valley at Zürich towards Zürichsee: Adlisberg and Pfannenstiel to the left, the Zimmerberg plateau, Albis and Sihl Valley to the right.

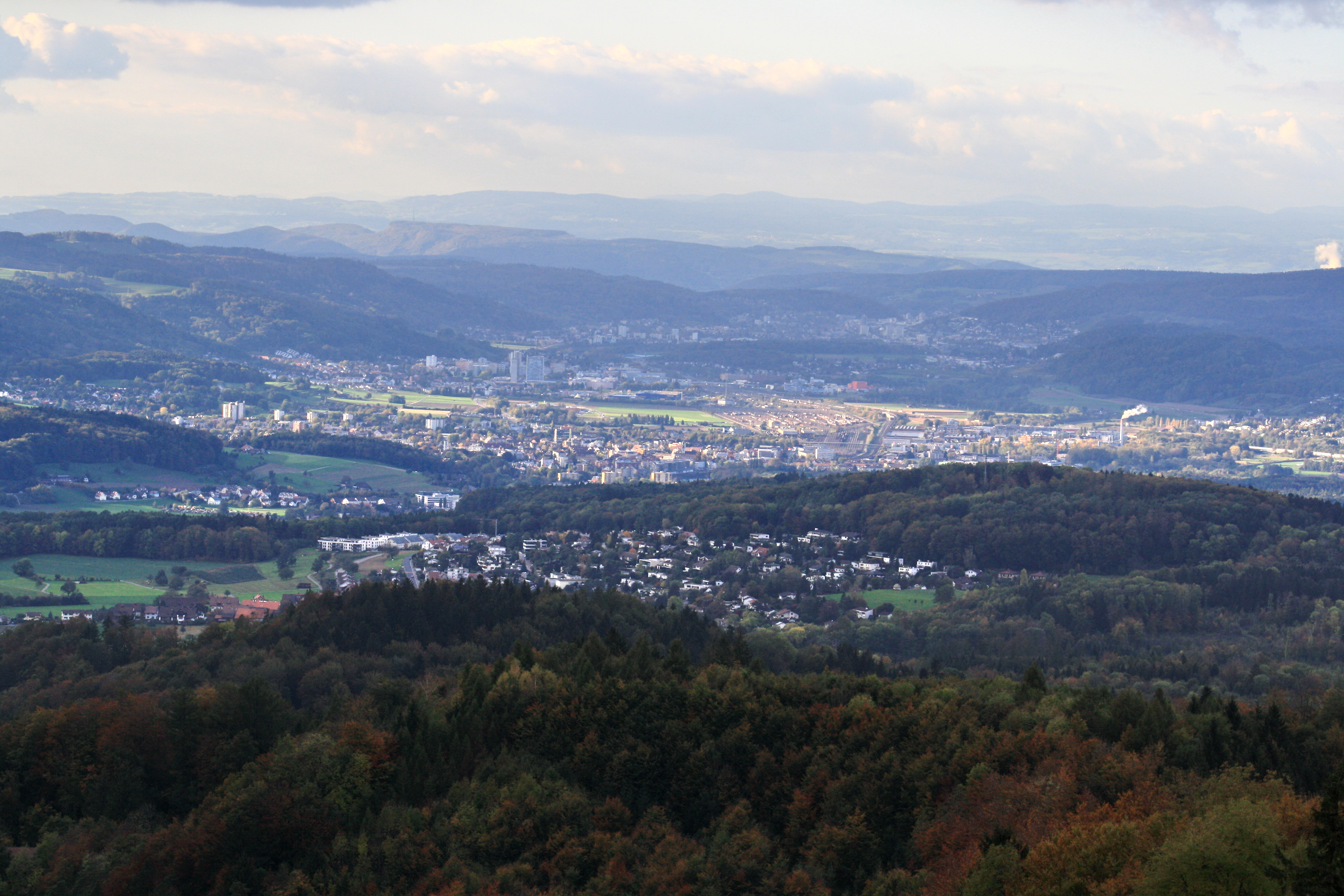
Limmat Valley as seen from Uetliberg tower

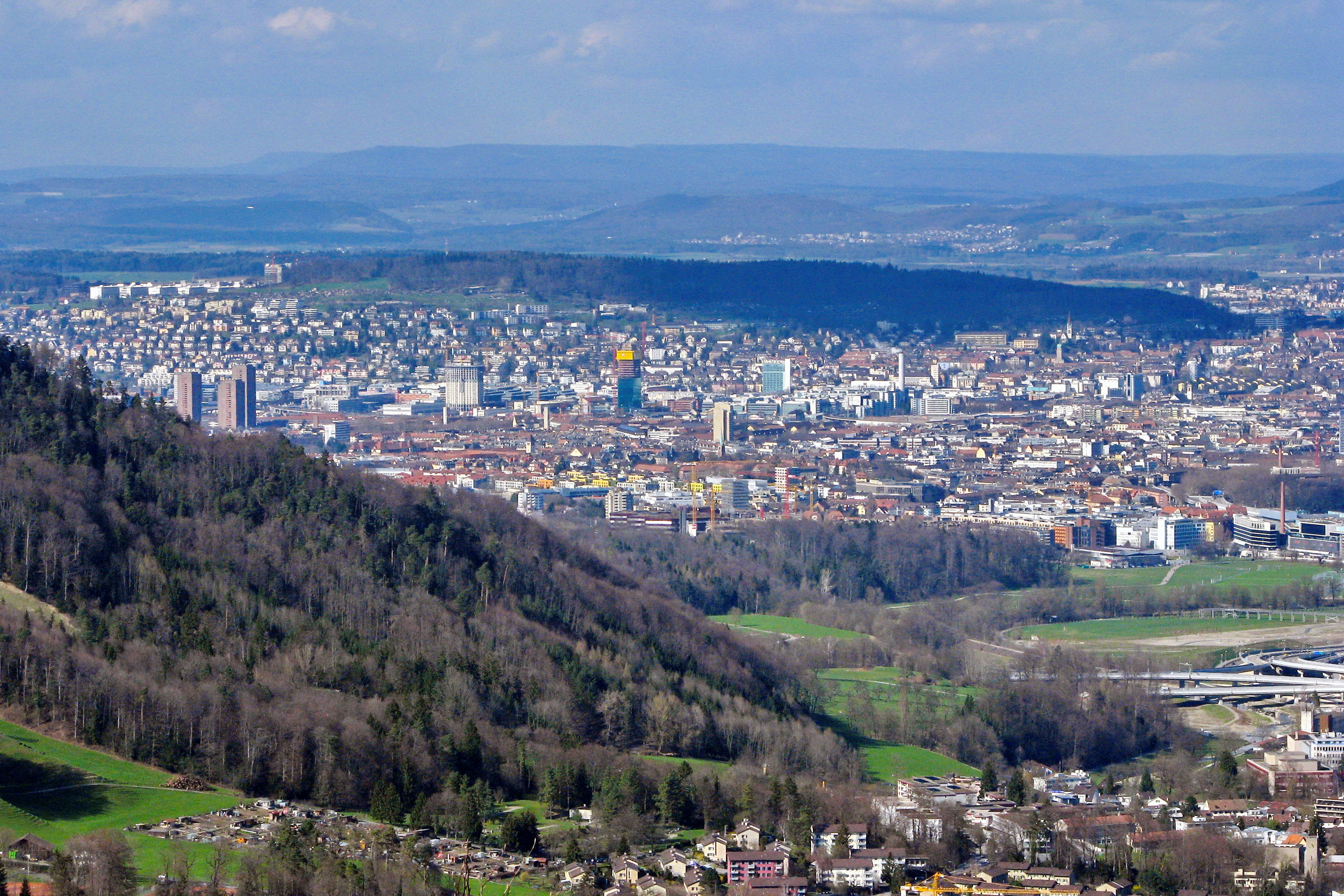
Käferberg and upper Limmat Valley, as seen from Felsenegg

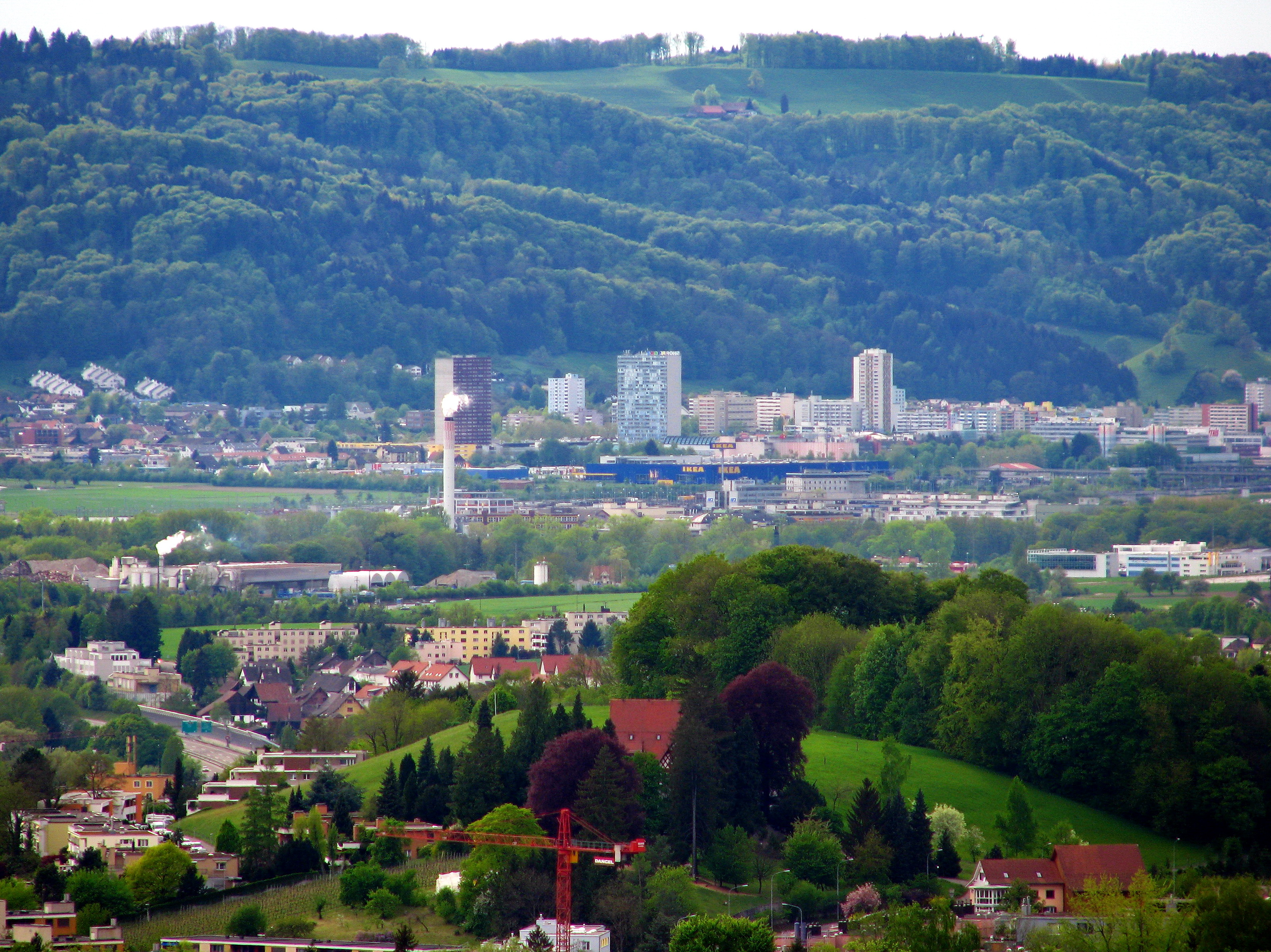
Limmat Valley at Spreitenbach as seen from Waidberg

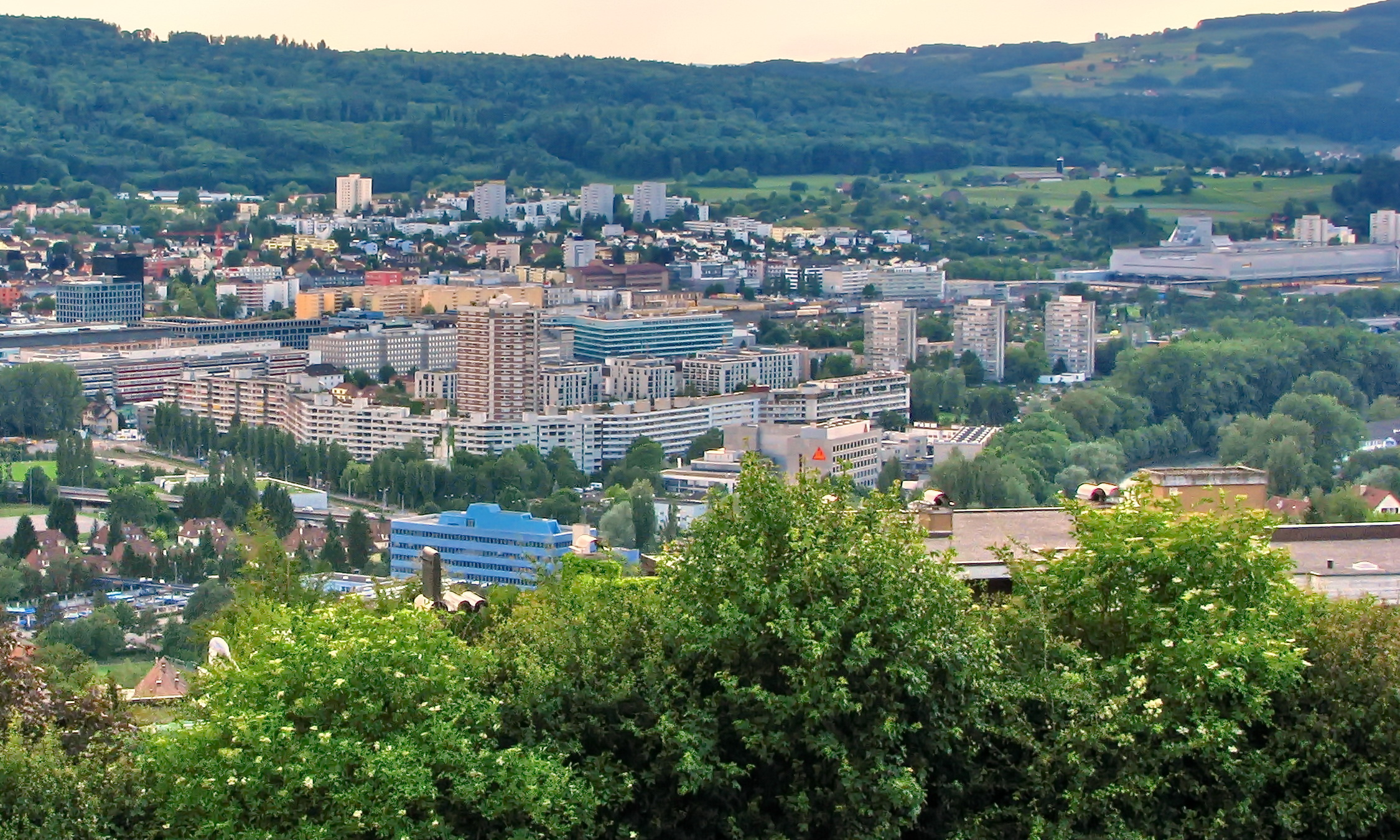
Limmat Valley at Altstetten (Zürich)

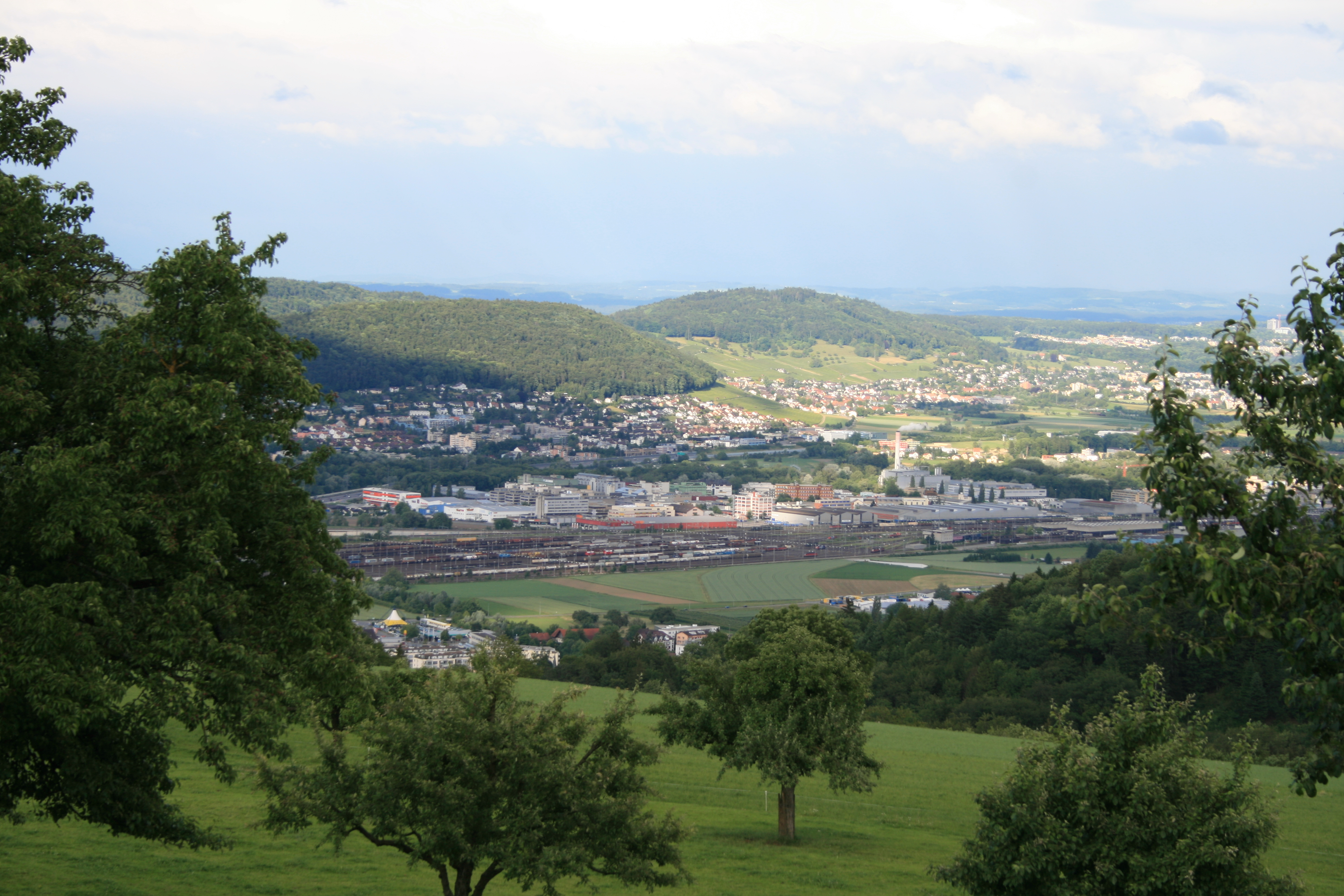
The valley and Rangierbahnhof Limmattal as seen from Heitersberg Pass

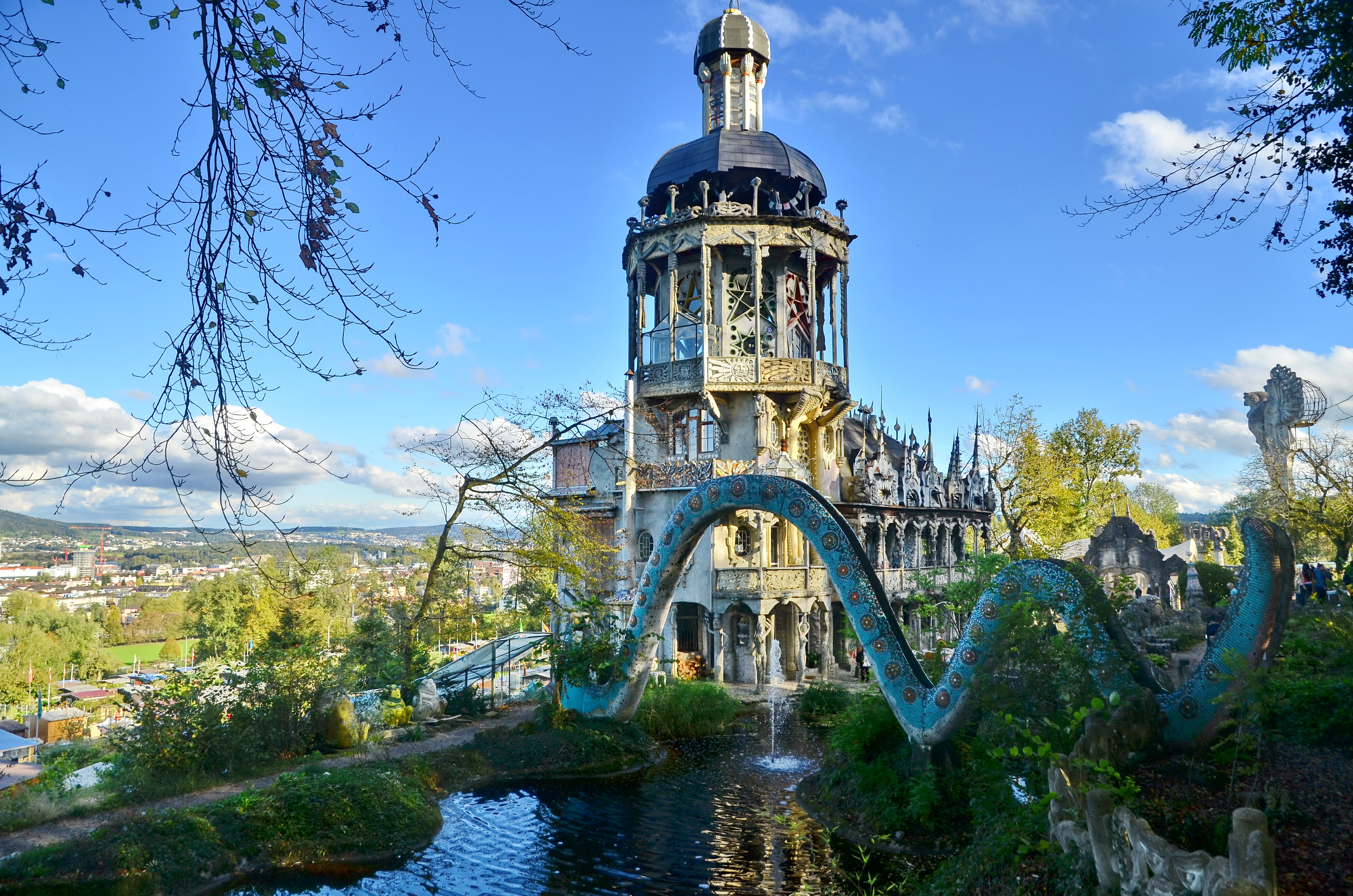
Limmattal as seen from the Bruno Weber Park

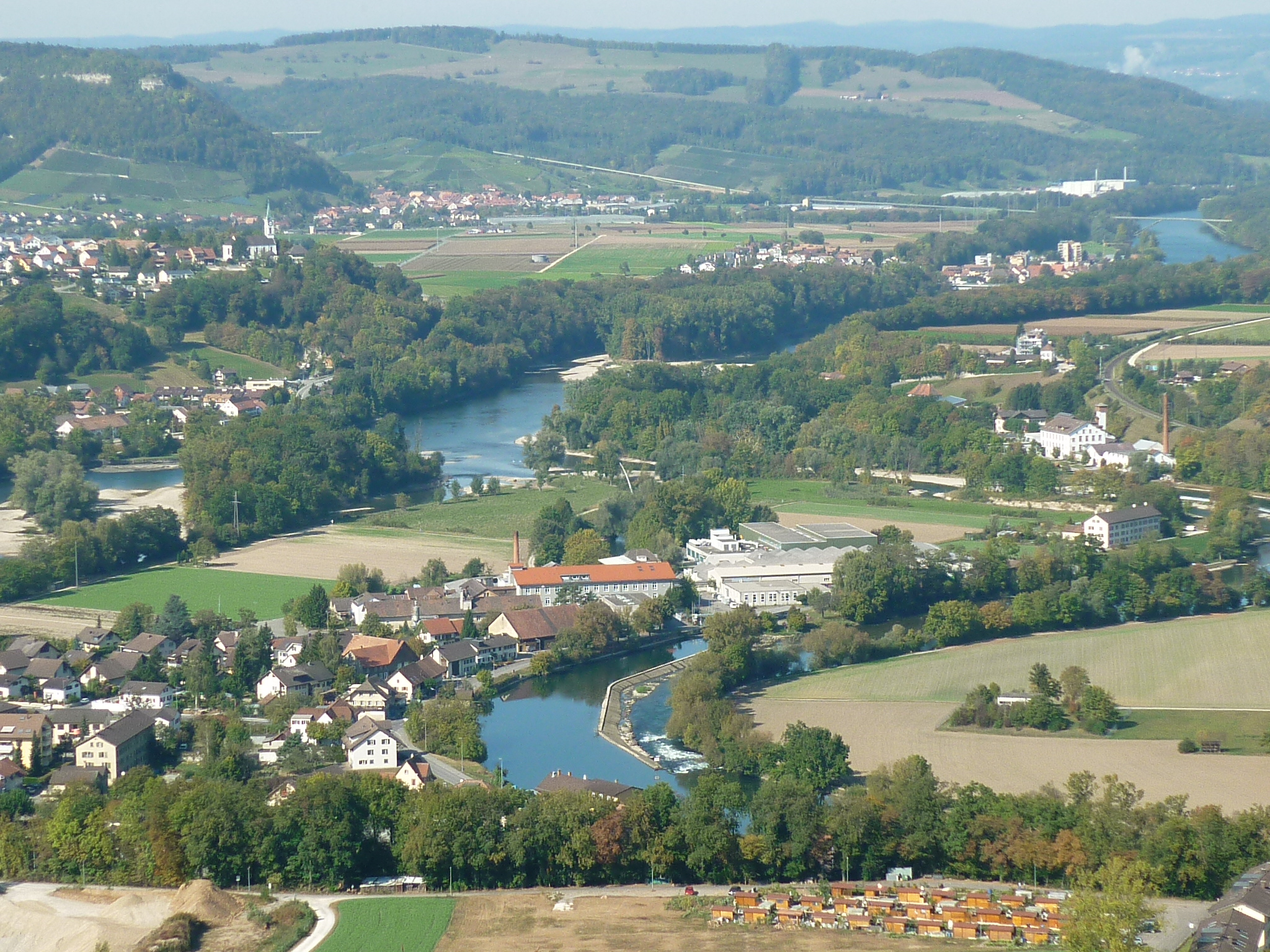
Wasserschloss near Gebenstorf

== Geography ==
The Limmat (German pronunciation: [ˈlɪmət]) is a 35 km (22 mi) long river located in the cantons of Zürich (ZH) and Aargau (AG). It is the continuation of the Linth, and is known as the Limmat from the point of effluence from Lake Zürich, in the city of Zürich, flowing in a northwesterly direction to the Aare. The confluence is located northeast of the small town of Brugg (AG), shortly after the mouth of the Reuss, and shortly before the Aare joins the Rhine. The confluence of the three rivers Aare, Reuss and Limmat is known as Wasserschloss.

== Nature ==
In 1930 the government of the canton of Zurich set the remains of the original Limmat riverside meadows and floodplains near Dietikon (Dietiker Altläufe) under conservation, as well in 2005 the floodplains (Dietiker Schachen) near Wettingen accommodating more than 150 plant species and rare species as common kingfisher, little ringed plover and grass snake.

== Region Limmattal ==
=== Cities and villages ===
The economical Region Limmattal comprises, among other communities in the districts of Dietikon (ZH) and Baden (AG), the cities and municipalities of Zürich, Oberengstringen, Unterengstringen, Schlieren, Weiningen, Urdorf, Dietikon, Bergdietikon, Geroldswil, Oetwil, Spreitenbach, Würenlos, Killwangen, Neuenhof, Wettingen, Baden, Ennetbaden, Obersiggenthal, Untersiggenthal and Turgi.

=== Economics ===
The Limmattal is heavily populated thanks to the good location factor, nearby the city of Zürich, among them excellent infrastructure, growing economics and attractive residential area besides the Limmat valley. Standortförderung Limmattal is a society to enhance networking of the region and to realize common projects by the communities in the region Limmatal.

The term "Limmattal" is also used for many organizations, such as the Regional Hospital Limmattal (German: Spital Limmattal) in Urdorf, the classification yard RBL (Rangierbahnhof Limmattal) provided by the SBB CFF FFS, the Limmattal's regional newspaper (Limmattaler Zeitung) and the regional gymnasium (Gymnasium Limmattal).

=== Transportation ===
The Limmattal has excellent transport links: S-Bahn Zürich is a modern rapid-transit system on the lines S3, S9, S12 and S17, in addition to the services of the Swiss Federal Railways (SBB CFF FFS), and around the city of Zürich provided by Verkehrsbetriebe Zürich (VBZ), the public transport operator in the city of Zurich and its suburbs. Near realization is an additional tramway called Limmattalbahn, between Zürich-Farbhof (Altstetten) and Killwangen-Spreitenbach, as continuation of the Zürich tram line 2 and of the Bremgarten-Dietikon-Bahn.

== Visitor attractions ==
- Bruno Weber Park
- Fahr Monastery
- Limmatauen
- Limmatspitz and Wasserschloss respectively confluences of Limmat, Reuss and Aare
