= Urs Allemann =

Swiss writer and journalist (1948–2024)

Urs Allemann (1 April 1948 – 24 November 2024) was a Swiss writer and journalist.

== Life and career ==
Allemann was born on 1 April 1948 in Schlieren, Switzerland, and grew up in Bonn and Berlin. He studied German and English at the University of Marburg and sociology and social psychology at Leibniz University Hannover. From 1975 to 1976 he was editor of the magazine Theater heute. From 1986 to 2005 he was literary editor on the arts section of the Basler Zeitung newspaper in Basel.

His work won several awards, including the Heimrad Bäcker Prize and the Swiss Literature Prize. He is known for his experimental prose style and has courted controversy in the past: his 1992 novel Babyfucker caused a minor scandal when it was presented in a literary competition (where despite protests from some of the judges, it went on to win the second-place Prize of Carinthia). Alleman died on 24 November 2024, at the age of 76.

== Selected works ==
- Fuzzhase. Ammann, Zürich, 1988
- Öz & Kco: Sieben fernmündliche Delirien. Ammann, Zürich, 1990
- Babyficker. Deuticke, Vienna. 1992. (Babyfucker, translated by Peter Smith, Les Figues Press, 2010)
- Der alte Mann und die Bank: Ein Fünfmontagsgequassel. Deuticke, Vienna, 1993. (The Old Man and the Bench, translated by Patrick Greaney, Dalkey Archive Press, 2015)
- Holder die Polder. Engeler, Basel, Weil am Rhein and Vienna, 2001
- schœn! schœn! Engeler, Basel and Weil am Rhein, 2003
- Im Kinde schwirren die Ahnen. Engeler, Basel and Weil am Rhein, 2008
- In Sepps Welt. Klever, Vienna, 2013
