= Oberengstringen =

- Municipality
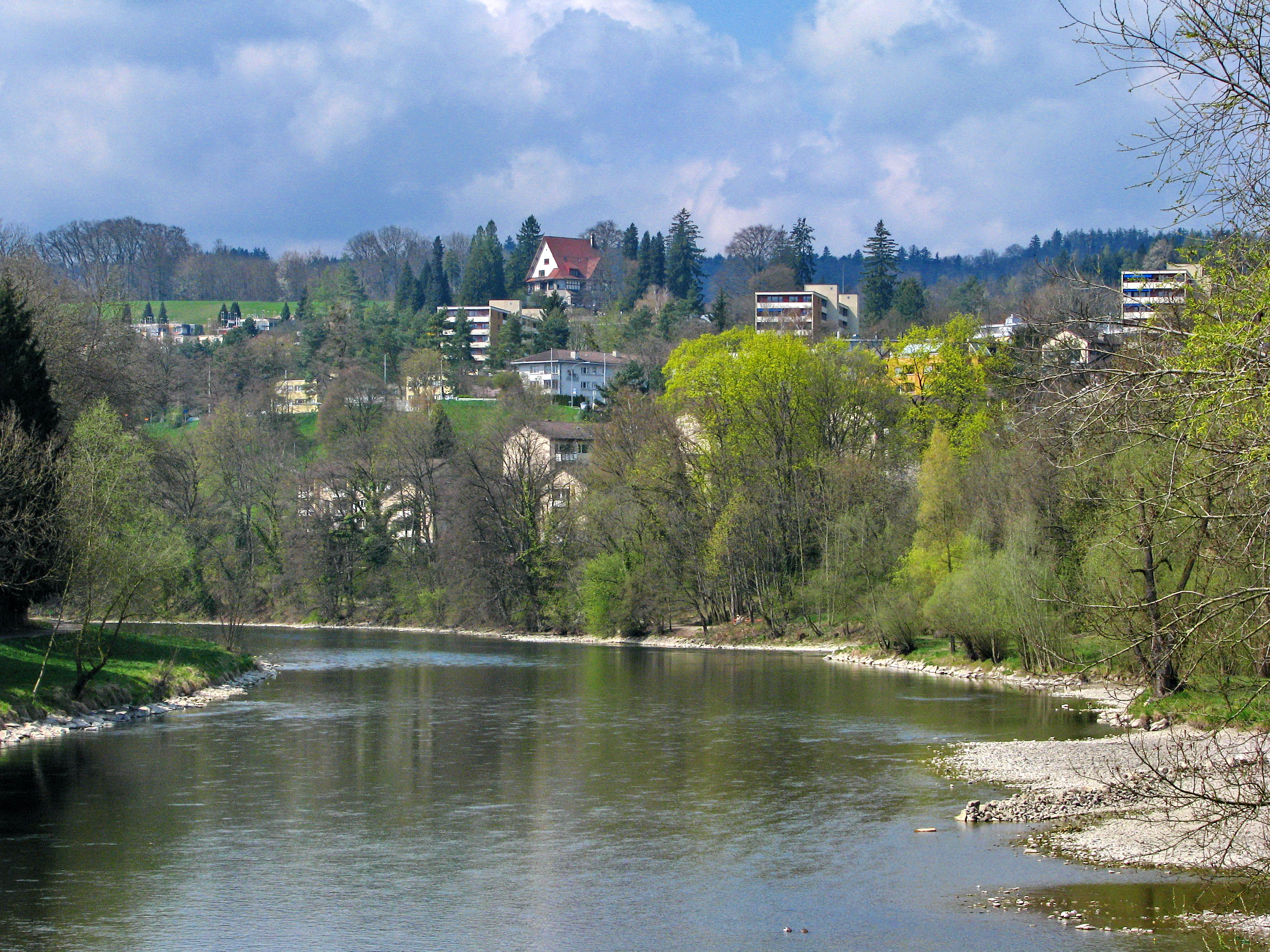

- Flag Coat of arms
- Location of Oberengstringen
- Location within Switzerland Location within Canton of Zurich
- Coordinates: 47°25′N 8°28′E
- Country: Switzerland
- Canton: Zurich
- District: Dietikon

Area
  - Total: 2.13 km^{2} (0.82 sq mi)
- Elevation: 413 m (1,355 ft)

Population (December 2020)
  - Total: 6,721
  - Density: 3,160/km^{2} (8,170/sq mi)
- Time zone: UTC+01:00 (CET)
  - Summer (DST): UTC+02:00 (CEST)
- Postal code: 8102
- SFOS number: 245
- ISO 3166 code: CH-ZH
- Surrounded by: Regensdorf, Schlieren, Unterengstringen, Zurich
- Website: www.oberengstringen.ch

Oberengstringen is a municipality in the district of Dietikon in the canton of Zürich in Switzerland, located in the Limmat Valley (German: Limmattal).

== History ==
Oberengstringen is first mentioned in 870 as Enstelingon. In 1306 it was mentioned as Obren Enstringen.

== Geography ==
Aerial view from 300 m by Walter Mittelholzer (1920)

Oberengstringen has an area of 2.1 km^{2} (0.81 sq mi). Of this area, 23.5% is used for agricultural purposes, while 26.3% is forested. Of the rest of the land, 47.4% is settled (buildings or roads) and the remainder (2.8%) is non-productive (rivers, glaciers or mountains). In 1996 housing and buildings made up 39% of the total area, while transportation infrastructure made up the rest (8.9%). Of the total unproductive area, water (streams and lakes) made up 2.8% of the area. As of 2007 46% of the total municipal area was undergoing some type of construction.

The village is located on the right bank of the Limmat on the road between Zürich through Höngg to Baden. From the 1950s to the 1970s it quickly grew into a suburb of Zürich.

== Werdinsel and Limmatauen ==
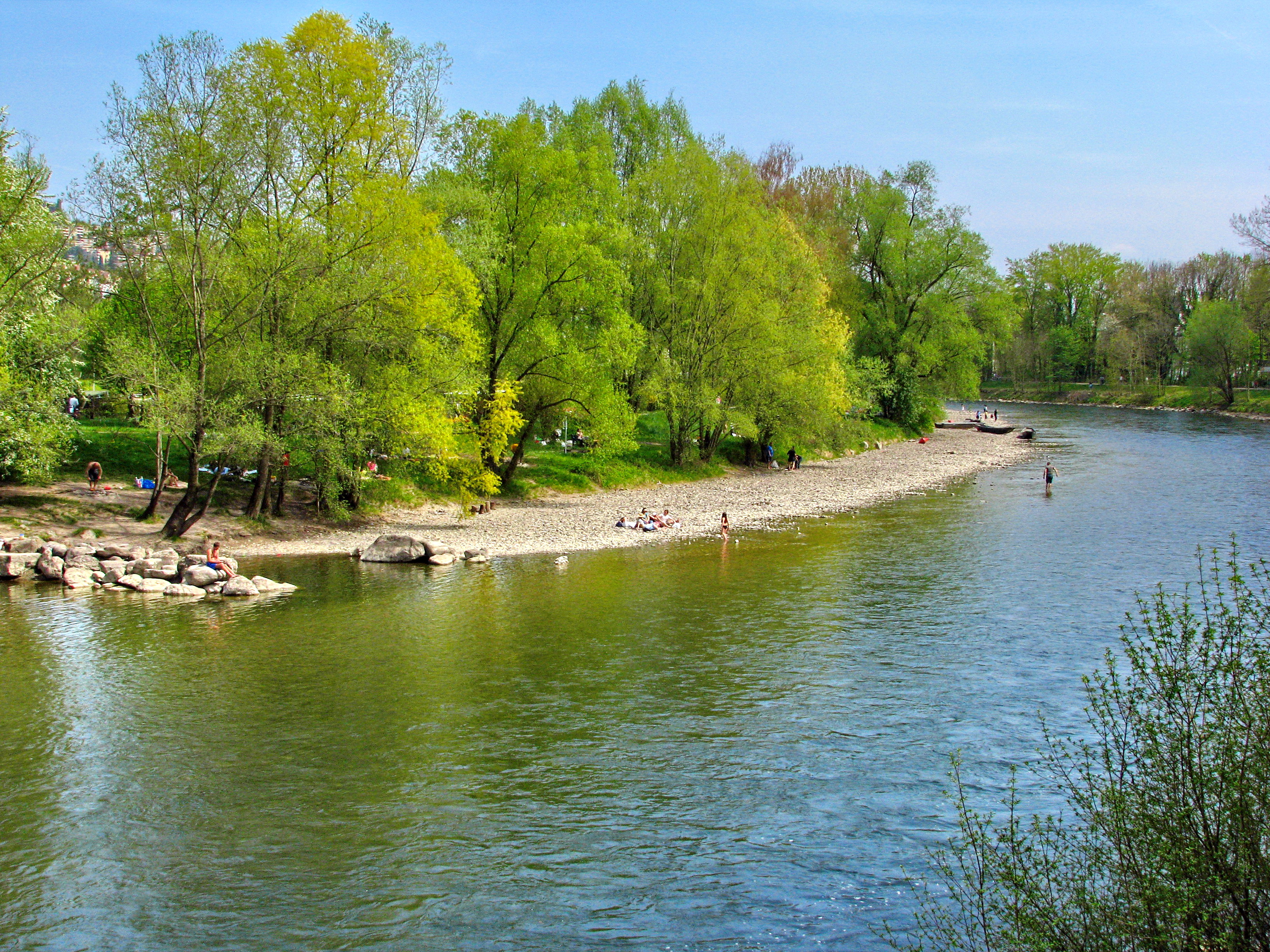
Werdinsel in the Limmat in Zürich

Limmatauen Werdhölzli is a protected forest and river area, partially situated in the municipality of Oberengstringen and between the Limmat weir at the Höngg power plant. Set under protection in 1945, the 1.8 kilometres (1.1 mi) long section of the Limmat and the Werdinsel were renatured, what enhanced the biodiversity, and thus the quality of the river landscape. In cooperation with the Canton of Zurich and the municipalities of Oberengstringen and Zürich, that section of the river was renewed. The access to the Limmat and the hiking path towards the Fahr Abbey was improved and the area was widened for pedestrians and cyclists. Orientation boards inform on the endemic flora and fauna, so the riparian zone may be crossed over a 320 metres (1,050 ft) long wooden bridge those material consists of the urban forest. After nearly a year of construction, the project was officially presented to the public on 20 September 2013. The costs of 9.4 million Swiss Francs are provided by the city and cantonal governments, and some companies in collaboration with the World Wildlife Fund Switzerland, which claims the place as very important to our rivers and streams, so that they can create their very structure.

== Demographics ==
Oberengstringen has a population (as of 31 December 2020) of 6,721. As of 2007, 24.8% of the population was made up of foreign nationals. As of 2008 the gender distribution of the population was 50% male and 50% female. Over the last 10 years the population has grown at a rate of 5.6%. Most of the population (as of 2000) speaks German (81.8%), with Italian being second most common ( 4.7%) and Serbo-Croatian being third ( 1.7%).

In the 2007 election the most popular party was the SVP which received 36.9% of the vote. The next three most popular parties were the SPS (19.5%), the FDP (15.3%) and the CVP (11.1%).

The age distribution of the population (as of 2000) is children and teenagers (0–19 years old) make up 19.6% of the population, while adults (20–64 years old) make up 63% and seniors (over 64 years old) make up 17.4%. In Oberengstringen about 75.2% of the population (between age 25-64) have completed either non-mandatory upper secondary education or additional higher education (either university or a Fachhochschule). There are 2882 households in Oberengstringen.

Oberengstringen has an unemployment rate of 3.01%. As of 2005, there were 10 people employed in the primary economic sector and about 4 businesses involved in this sector. 274 people are employed in the secondary sector and there are 46 businesses in this sector. 977 people are employed in the tertiary sector, with 196 businesses in this sector. As of 2007 66.7% of the working population were employed full-time, and 33.3% were employed part-time.

As of 2008 there were 2291 Catholics and 1923 Protestants in Oberengstringen. In the 2000 census, religion was broken down into several smaller categories. From the 2000 census, 36.7% were some type of Protestant, with 35.1% belonging to the Swiss Reformed Church and 1.6% belonging to other Protestant churches. 37% of the population were Catholic. Of the rest of the population, 0% were Muslim, 8.8% belonged to another religion (not listed), 3.7% did not give a religion, and 12.8% were atheist or agnostic.

The historical population is given in the following table:

year	population
1634	61
1850	453
1888	322
1900	416
1950	1,242
1960	4,088
1980	6,154
2000	5,879
