= Urdorf =

- Municipality
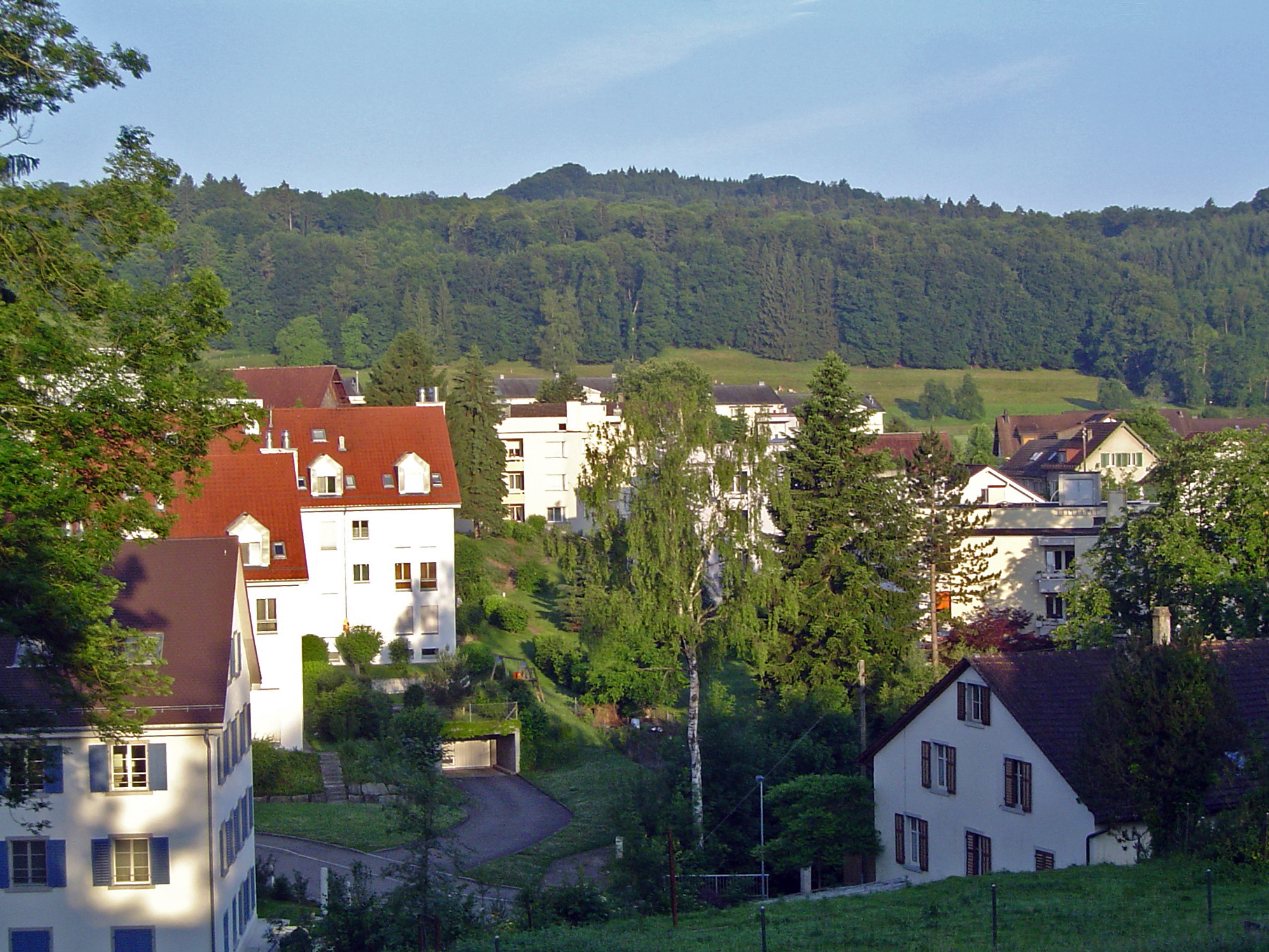

- Flag Coat of arms
- Location of Urdorf
- Location within Switzerland Location within Canton of Zurich
- Coordinates: 47°23′N 8°26′E
- Country: Switzerland
- Canton: Zurich
- District: Dietikon

Area
  - Total: 7.62 km^{2} (2.94 sq mi)
- Elevation: 416 m (1,365 ft)

Population (December 2020)
  - Total: 10,019
  - Density: 1,310/km^{2} (3,410/sq mi)
- Time zone: UTC+01:00 (CET)
  - Summer (DST): UTC+02:00 (CEST)
- Postal code: 8902
- SFOS number: 250
- ISO 3166 code: CH-ZH
- Surrounded by: Bergdietikon (AG), Birmensdorf, Dietikon, Rudolfstetten-Friedlisberg (AG), Schlieren, Uitikon, Zurich
- Website: www.urdorf.ch

Urdorf is a municipality in the district of Dietikon in the canton of Zürich in Switzerland, located in the Limmat Valley (German: Limmattal).

== Geography ==
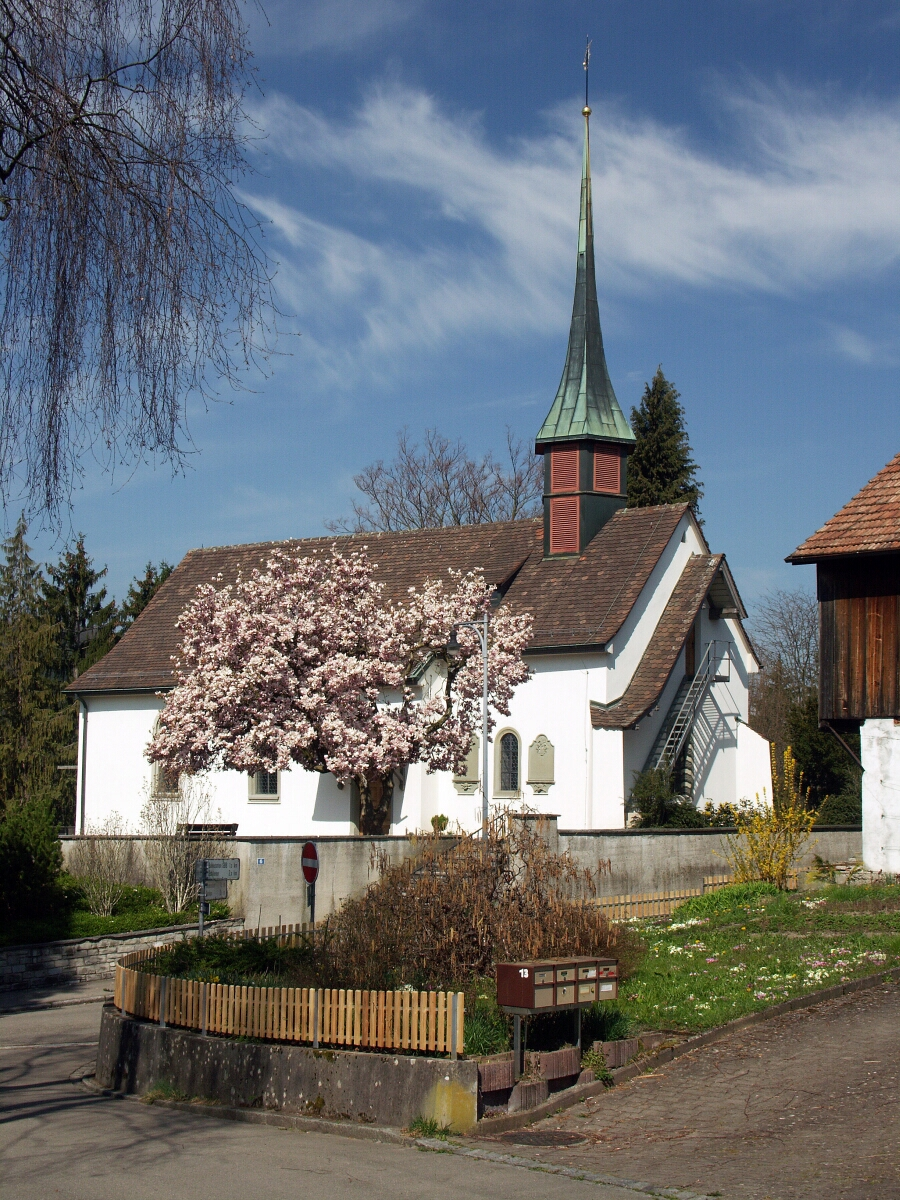
Protestant church Urdorf

Aerial view (1965)

Urdorf has an area of 7.6 km^{2} (2.9 sq mi). Of this area, 32.2% is used for agricultural purposes, while 32.6% is forested. Of the rest of the land, 34.5% is settled (buildings or roads) and the remainder (0.7%) is non-productive (rivers, glaciers or mountains). In 1996 housing and buildings made up 25.9% of the total area, while transportation infrastructure made up the rest (8.8%). Of the total unproductive area, water (streams and lakes) made up 0.4% of the area. As of 2007 26.2% of the total municipal area was undergoing some type of construction. In 1931 Niederurdorf and Oberurdorf were excluded from the Zürich District to form the municipality of Urdorf.

== Demographics ==
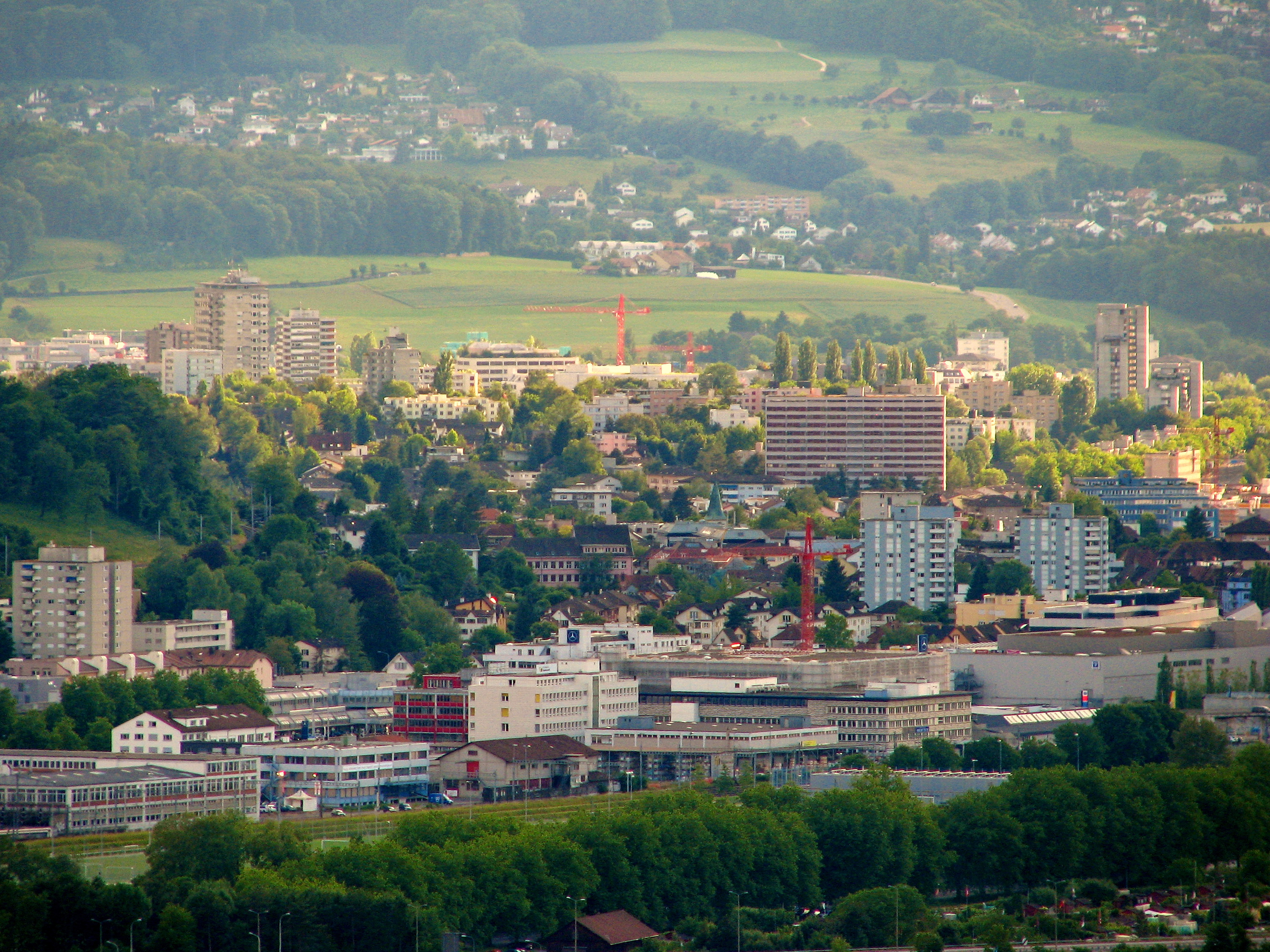
Schlieren (in the foreground) and Urdorf as seen from Käferberg-Waidberg

Urdorf has a population (as of 31 December 2020) of 10,019. As of 2007, 18.9% of the population was made up of foreign nationals. As of 2008 the gender distribution of the population was 49.3% male and 50.7% female. Over the last 10 years the population has grown at a rate of 1.4%. Most of the population (as of 2000) speaks German (85.7%), with Italian being second most common ( 3.6%) and Serbo-Croatian being third ( 2.1%).

In the 2007 election the most popular party was the SVP which received 40.4% of the vote. The next three most popular parties were the SPS (21.1%), the FDP (10.8%) and the CVP (9.2%).

The age distribution of the population (as of 2000) is children and teenagers (0–19 years old) make up 21.7% of the population, while adults (20–64 years old) make up 64.4% and seniors (over 64 years old) make up 13.9%. In Urdorf about 77.4% of the population (between age 25–64) have completed either non-mandatory upper secondary education or additional higher education (either university or a Fachhochschule). There are 4272 households in Urdorf.

Urdorf has an unemployment rate of 1.92%. As of 2005, there were 56 people employed in the primary economic sector and about 14 businesses involved in this sector. 1168 people are employed in the secondary sector and there are 116 businesses in this sector. 4303 people are employed in the tertiary sector, with 382 businesses in this sector. As of 2007 33.3% of the working population were employed full-time, and 66.7% were employed part-time.

As of 2008 there were 3332 Catholics and 3262 Protestants in Urdorf. In the 2000 census, religion was broken down into several smaller categories. From the 2000 census, 42.1% were some type of Protestant, with 39.8% belonging to the Swiss Reformed Church and 2.3% belonging to other Protestant churches. 37.4% of the population were Catholic. Of the rest of the population, 0% were Muslim, 6.2% belonged to another religion (not listed), 2.7% did not give a religion, and 11.1% were atheist or agnostic.

== Transportation ==
The municipality is located on the A3 motorway. The railway stations of Urdorf and Urdorf-Weihermatt are stops of the Zürich S-Bahn on the lines S9 and S15. Urdorf station is a 13-minute ride from Zürich Hauptbahnhof. Bus lines 302, 303, 308, 311, and 314 provide connections to neighbouring Dietikon, Schlieren, and Altstetten.

== New Development ==
The Spitzacker Shopping Center has been renovated, now offering a significantly broadened range of quality for shoppers; construction of the residential will continue into 2015.

== Notable people ==
- Alina Pätz (born 1990 in Urdorf) a two-time World champion Swiss curler
- Marco Schönbächler (born 1990 in Urdorf) a Swiss professional footballer
