= Schlieren, Switzerland =

Schlieren
- Municipality
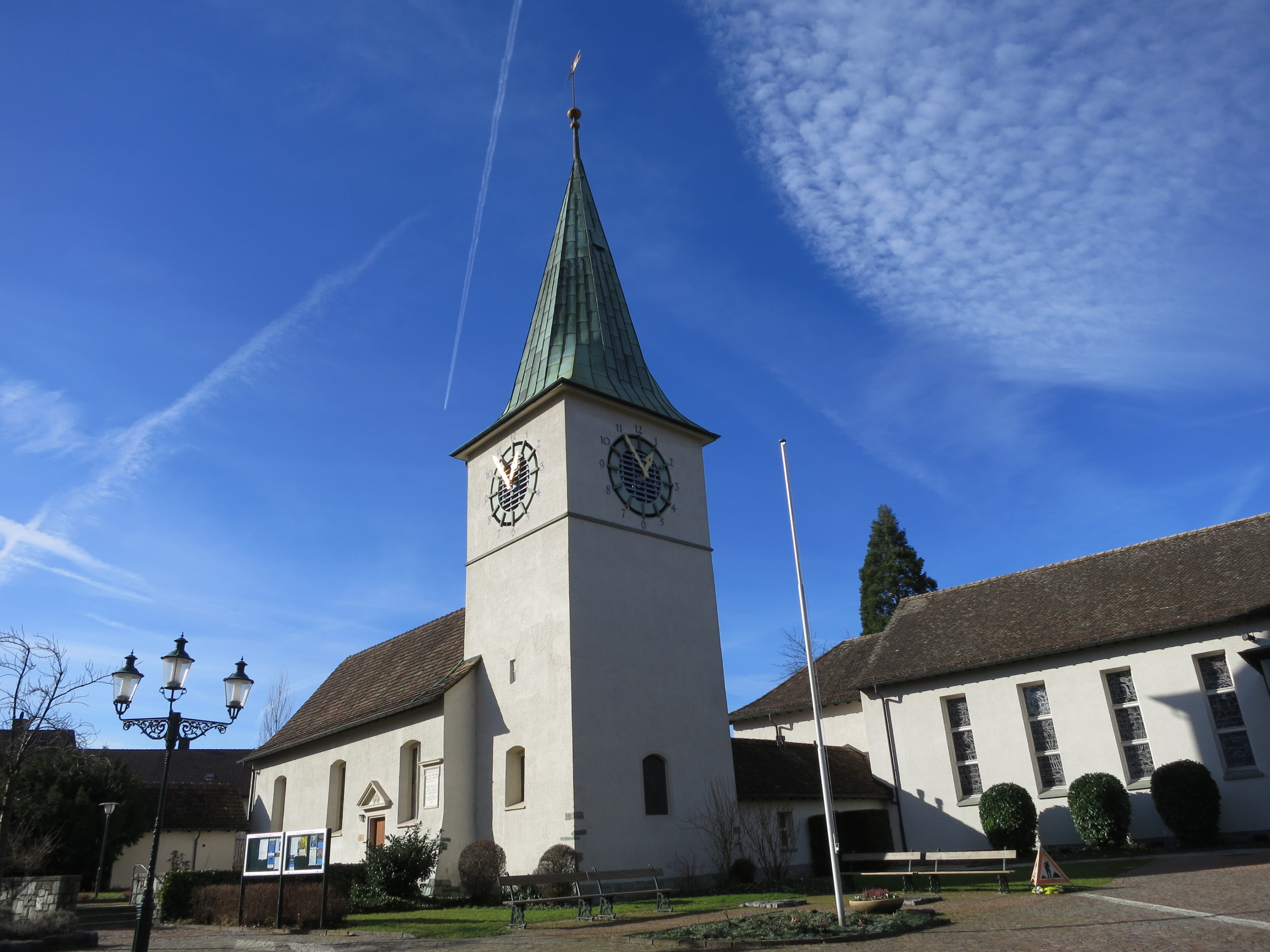

- Flag Coat of arms
- Location of Schlieren
- Location within Switzerland Location within Canton of Zurich
- Coordinates: 47°24′N 8°27′E
- Country: Switzerland
- Canton: Zurich
- District: Dietikon

Government
  - Executive: Stadtrat with 7 members
  - Mayor: Stadtpräsident; Markus Bärtschiger SPS/PSS (as of 09.2020)
  - Parliament: Gemeindeparlament with 36 members

Area
  - Total: 6.38 km^{2} (2.46 sq mi)
- Elevation: 394 m (1,293 ft)

Population (December 2007)
  - Total: 13,860
  - Density: 2,170/km^{2} (5,630/sq mi)
- Time zone: UTC+01:00 (CET)
  - Summer (DST): UTC+02:00 (CEST)
- Postal code: 8952
- SFOS number: 247
- ISO 3166 code: CH-ZH
- Surrounded by: Dietikon, Oberengstringen, Uitikon, Unterengstringen, Urdorf, Zurich
- Website: www.schlieren.ch

Schlieren (Zürich German Schlierä) is a municipality in the district of Dietikon in the canton of Zürich in Switzerland.

== History ==
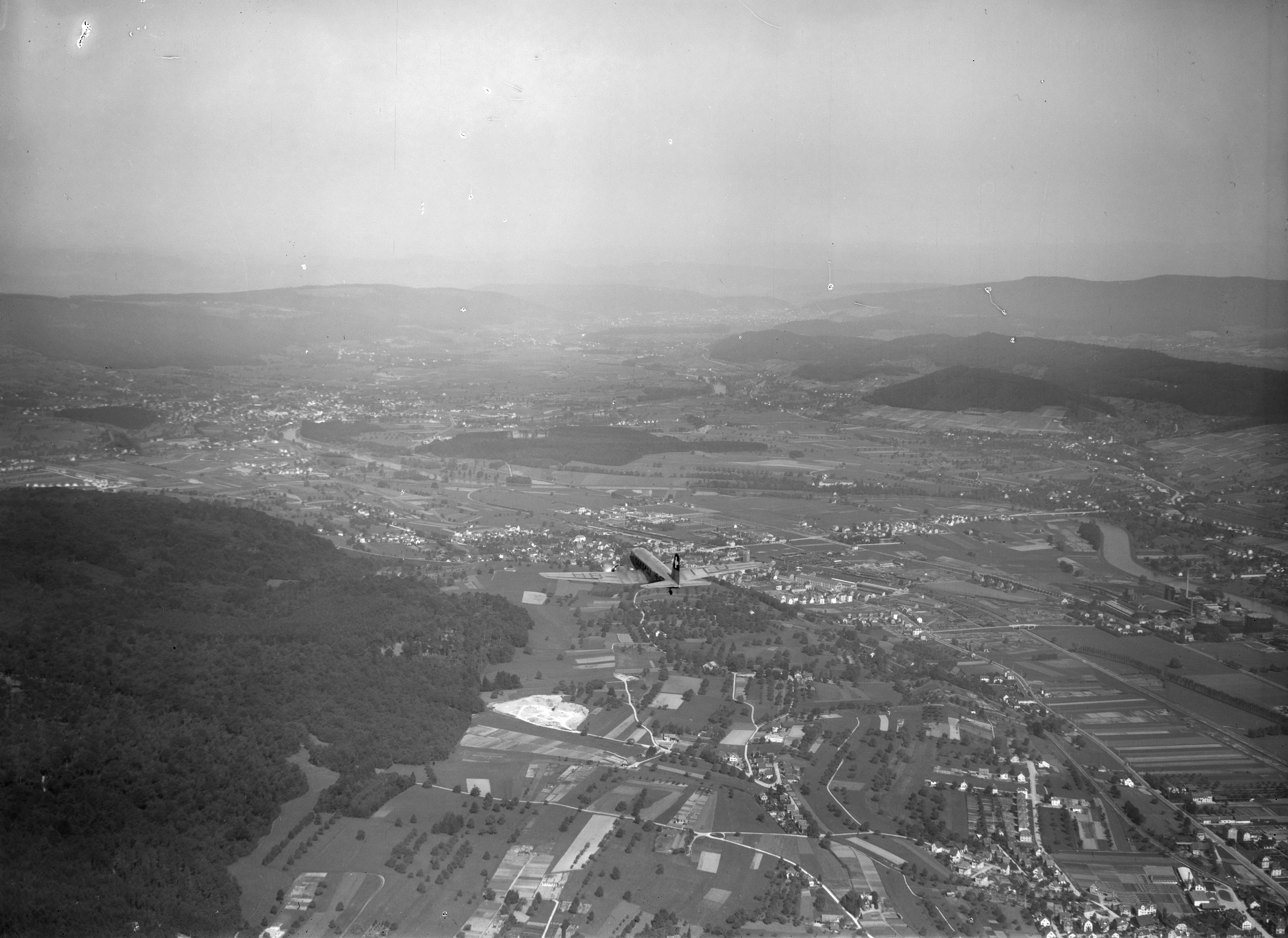
Aerial view by Walter Mittelholzer (1935)

The oldest artifact discovered in the Canton of Zürich is a Stone Age Neanderthal hand axe which was found in Schlieren, and dates back to approximately 100,000 BCE.

Schlieren was first mentioned in 828. Until 1415, Schlieren belonged to Habsburg. After the conquest of Aargau by the Swiss Confederates it was a component of the county of Baden. In 1803 Schlieren was assigned to the Canton of Zürich. In 1777 the minister Heinrich Keller created here the first "deaf-mute school" in Switzerland. In the late 1800s, Schlieren began evolving from a rural agricultural village into a burgeoning urban town, a change driven by the industrial revolution. Thanks to the proximity to the city of Zürich and the good traffic facilities (Tram, S-Bahn), Schlieren showed a population growth of 10,000 since the 1930s.

Schlieren was considered for inclusion of the expansion of Zurich's city limits, but was ultimately not part of the expansion of 1934.

== Geography ==
Schlieren has an area of 6.6 km^{2} (2.5 sq mi). Of this area, 19.5% is used for agricultural purposes, while 28.1% is forested. Of the rest of the land, 50.7% is settled (buildings or roads) and the remainder (1.7%) is non-productive (rivers, glaciers or mountains). In 1996 housing and buildings made up 36.6% of the total area, while transportation infrastructure made up the rest (14.1%). Of the total unproductive area, water (streams and lakes) made up 1.8% of the area. As of 2007 43.5% of the total municipal area was undergoing some type of construction.

Schlieren lies to the south of the river Limmat in the Limmat Valley (German: Limmattal), and west of Zurich. It is part of the Zurich metropolitan area.

== Demographics ==
Schlieren has a population (as of 2022) of 20,350, of which 45.9% (9,324 people) are foreign nationals, the highest figure of all municipalities in the canton of Zurich.

In the 2007 election the most popular party was the SVP which received 40.8% of the vote. The next three most popular parties were the SPS (21.1%), the FDP (10.1%) and the CVP (9.3%).

The age distribution of the population (as of 2000) is children and teenagers (0–19 years old) make up 20.1% of the population, while adults (20–64 years old) make up 64.2% and seniors (over 64 years old) make up 15.7%. In Schlieren about 58.8% of the population (between the ages of 25 and 64) have completed either non-mandatory upper secondary education or additional higher education (either university or a Fachhochschule). There are 6262 households in Schlieren.

Schlieren has an unemployment rate of 4.23%. As of 2005, there were 62 people employed in the primary economic sector and about 11 businesses involved in this sector. 2796 people are employed in the secondary sector and there are 189 businesses in this sector. 8688 people are employed in the tertiary sector, with 659 businesses in this sector. As of 2007 39.1% of the working population were employed full-time, and 60.9% were employed part-time.

As of 2008 there were 5481 Catholics and 2920 Protestants in Schlieren. In the 2000 census, religion was broken down into several smaller categories. From the 2000 census, 29.5% were some type of Protestant, with 27.1% belonging to the Swiss Reformed Church and 2.4% belonging to other Protestant churches. 39.5% of the population were Catholic. Of the rest of the population, 10.2% were Muslim, 15.2% belonged to another religion (not listed), 4.7% did not give a religion, and 9.2% were atheist or agnostic.

== Government and infrastructure ==
Schlieren is home to the Eastern Switzerland Office of the Investigation Bureau for Railway, Funicular and Boat Accidents.

== Transportation ==
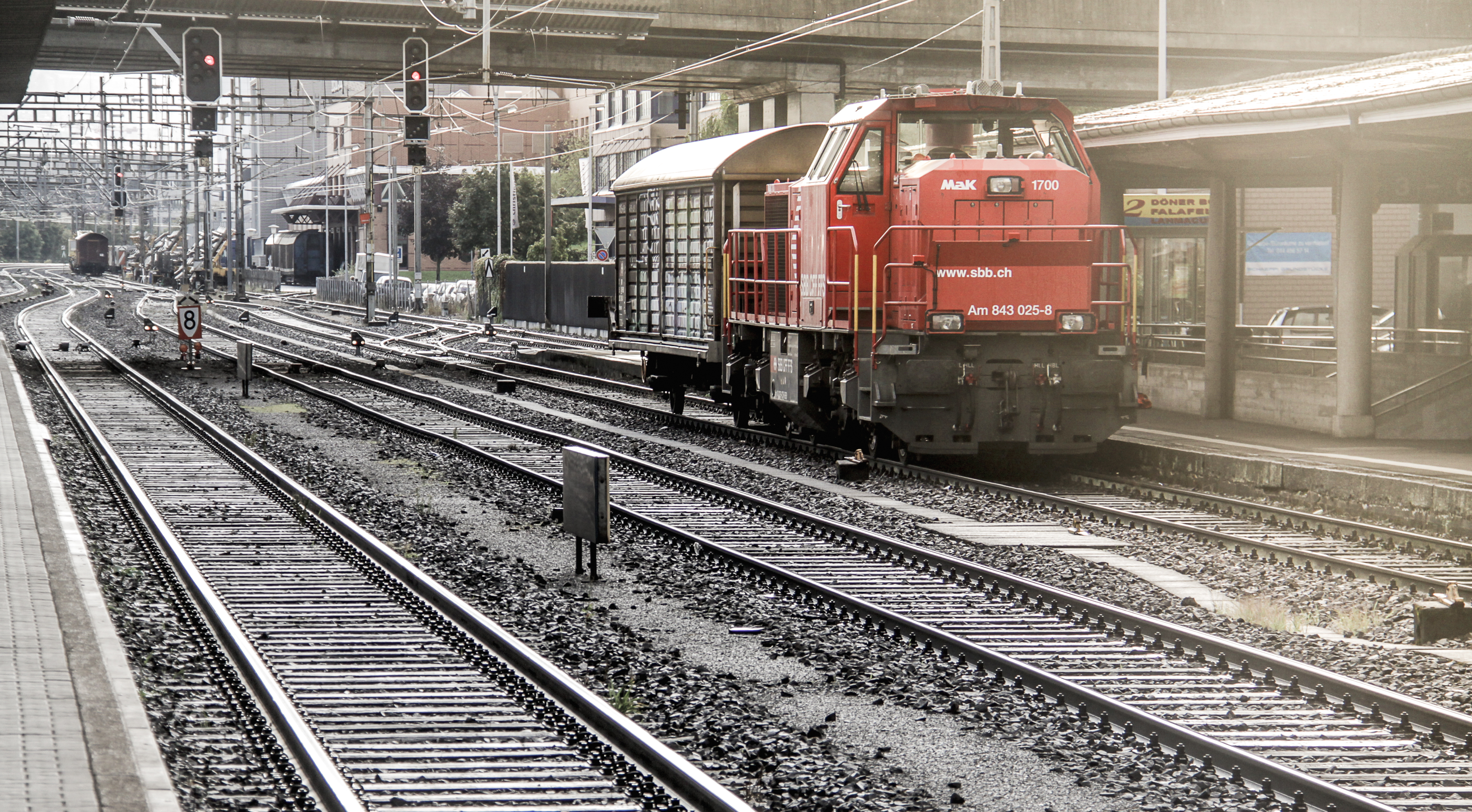
Schlieren train station

The municipality is served by two railway stations, on different lines of the Zürich S-Bahn. Schlieren railway station is in the geographic centre of the municipality and a stop on lines S3 and S12. Although Urdorf railway station takes its name from the adjoining municipality of Urdorf, it is actually located just within the boundaries of Schlieren, and is a stop on lines S9 and S15.

Between 1900 and 1931, Dietikon was a stop on the Limmattal tramway from Zürich, and from 1931 to 1955 it was the terminus of that line. Until recently, it was the terminus of Zürich trolleybus route 31 that replaced the truncated tramway. The Limmattal light rail line follows a similar alignment, from Zürich Altstetten railway station to Killwangen, and Zürich tram route 2 will be extended to Schlieren to replace the trolleybus.

== Objects of interest ==
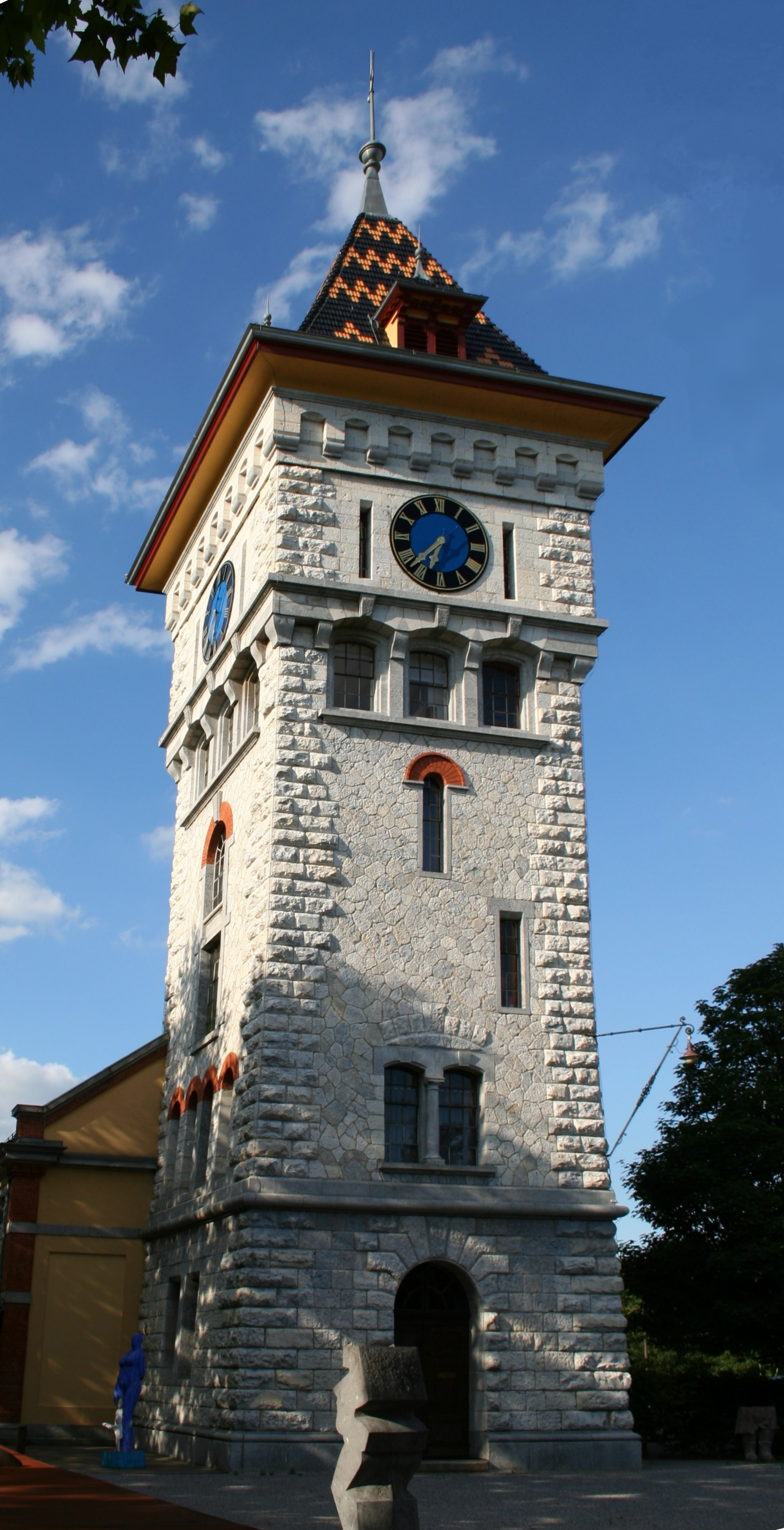
So called Gaswerk tower in Schlieren

Former gas facility. Local museum and several city parks. Biggest covered climbing hall in Europe.

== Politics ==
Since 2019 the town president (mayor) is Markus Bärtschiger of the Social Democratic Party.

== Education ==
Schools in Schlieren include Schule Hofacker, Schule Grabenstrasse, Schule Schulstrasse, Schule Zelgli, and Schule Kalktarren.

== Sports interest ==
At 3 October 1909 in Schlieren, the fourth Gordon Bennett Cup in ballooning was held. "Crowds came out to Schlieren. 40 mounted and 260 unmounted patrolmen took care to keep the traffic flowing. The chronicles report about 400 automobiles, counted a total of 142 trains on the railroad and the tramway should have transported 400.000 persons. It was the most busy traffic, Zurich had ever seen till then, and never at an air show in Switzerland, this amount of spectators was reached again."

== Notable people ==
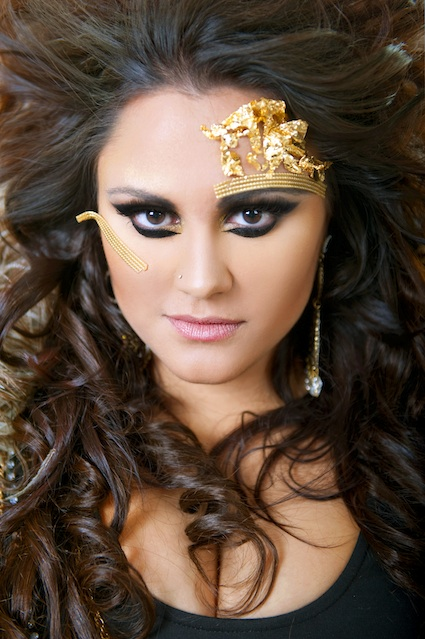
Diamá, 2008

- Paul Zollinger (born 1944), a Swiss former racing cyclist, the Swiss National Road Race champion in 1966
- Urs Allemann (born 1948), writer and journalist
- Mario Cantaluppi (born 1974), former footballer, 500 club caps and 22 caps for Switzerland
- Diamá (born 1980), aka Claudia D'Addio, is a Swiss singer
- Martin Steuble (born 1988), a Filipino professional footballer, approx. 150 club caps and 39 for the Philippines
- Tanja Schärer (born 1989), a Swiss freestyle skier, specializing in aerials, competed at the 2010 Winter Olympics
- Anto Grgić (born 1996), a Swiss professional footballer currently playing for FC Sion
- Arijanet Muric (born 1998), a Swiss professional footballer currently playing for Burnley F.C.
- Kevin Iodice (born 2001), a Swiss professional footballer currently playing for FC Vaduz
