= Dielsdorf railway station =

Railway station in Switzerland

Dielsdorf
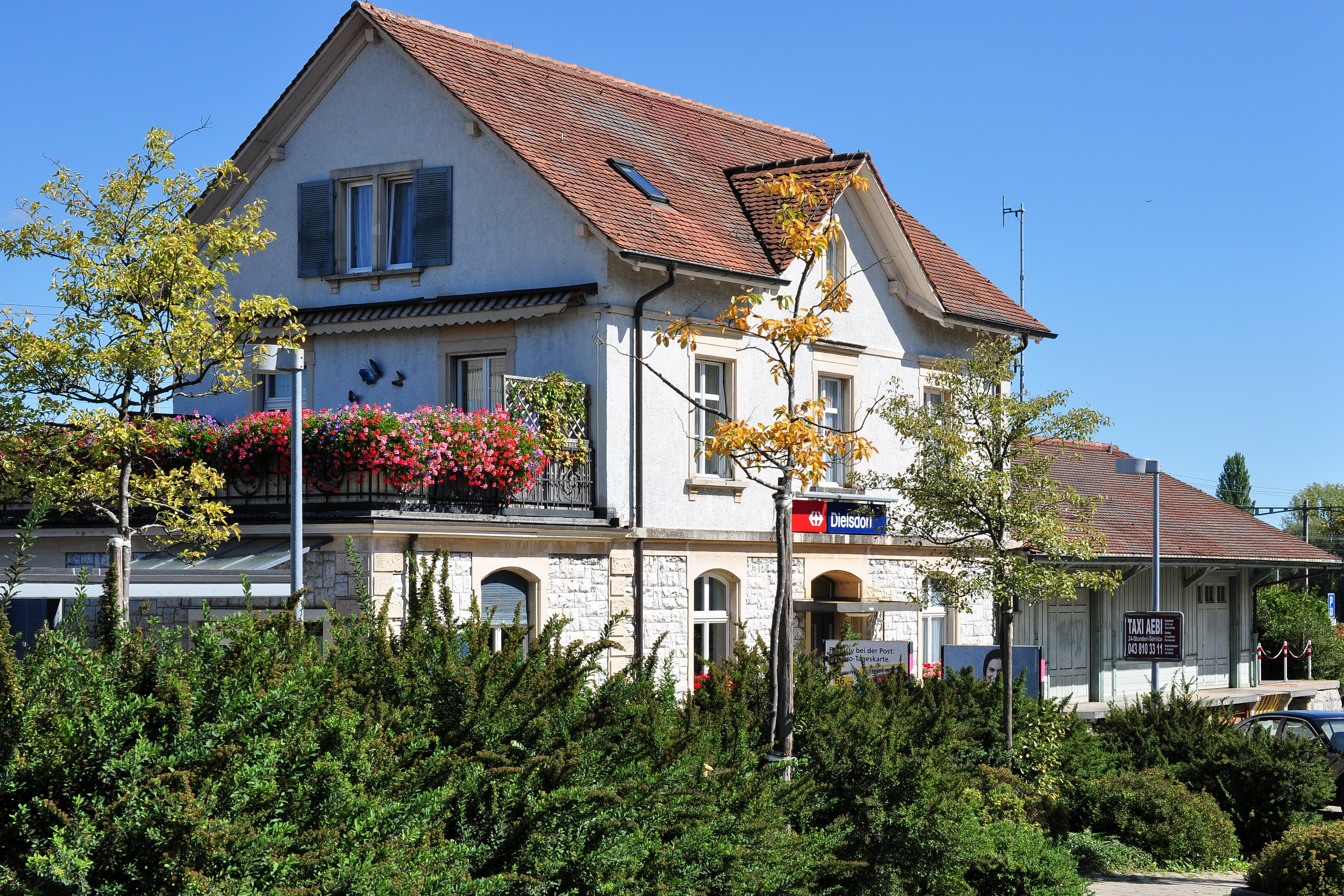
- The station building in 2011

General information
- Location: Dielsdorf; Switzerland
- Coordinates: 47°28′57″N 8°27′34″E
- Elevation: 429 m (1,407 ft)
- Owner: Swiss Federal Railways
- Line: Wehntal line
- Distance: 17.5 km (10.9 mi) from Zürich Hauptbahnhof
- Platforms: 1 island platform
- Tracks: 3
- Train operators: Swiss Federal Railways
- Connections: ZVV
- Bus: PostAuto bus route 535; VBG bus routes 456 593

Other information
- Fare zone: 112 (ZVV)

Passengers
- 2018: 3,200 per weekday

Services
Preceding station	Zurich S-Bahn	Following station
Steinmaur towards Niederweningen	S15	Niederhasli towards Rapperswil
Location
- Location within Switzerland Location within Canton of Zurich

Dielsdorf railway station is a railway station in the Swiss canton of Zurich and municipality of Dielsdorf. The station is located on the Wehntal line, within fare zone 112 of the Zürcher Verkehrsverbund (ZVV).

== History ==
The station was opened in 1865, and was initially the terminus of a branch of the Bülach-Regensberg Railway from Oberglatt. The line was extended by the Swiss Northeastern Railway as part of their Wehntal line to Niederweningen in 1891, and Dielsdorf became a through station.

== Services ==
Dielsdorf railway station is served by S-Bahn trains only. It is an intermediate stop of Zurich S-Bahn line S15, which runs between Niederweningen and Rapperswil-Jona via Zurich. As of the December 2020 timetable change, the following services stop at Dielsdorf:

- Zurich S-Bahn S15: half-hourly service between Niederweningen and Rapperswil, via Zürich HB.

The railway station is also served by regional buses of PostAuto and Verkehrsbetriebe Glattal (VBG).

== See also ==
- Rail transport in Switzerland
