= Niederhasli railway station =

Railway station in Switzerland

Niederhasli
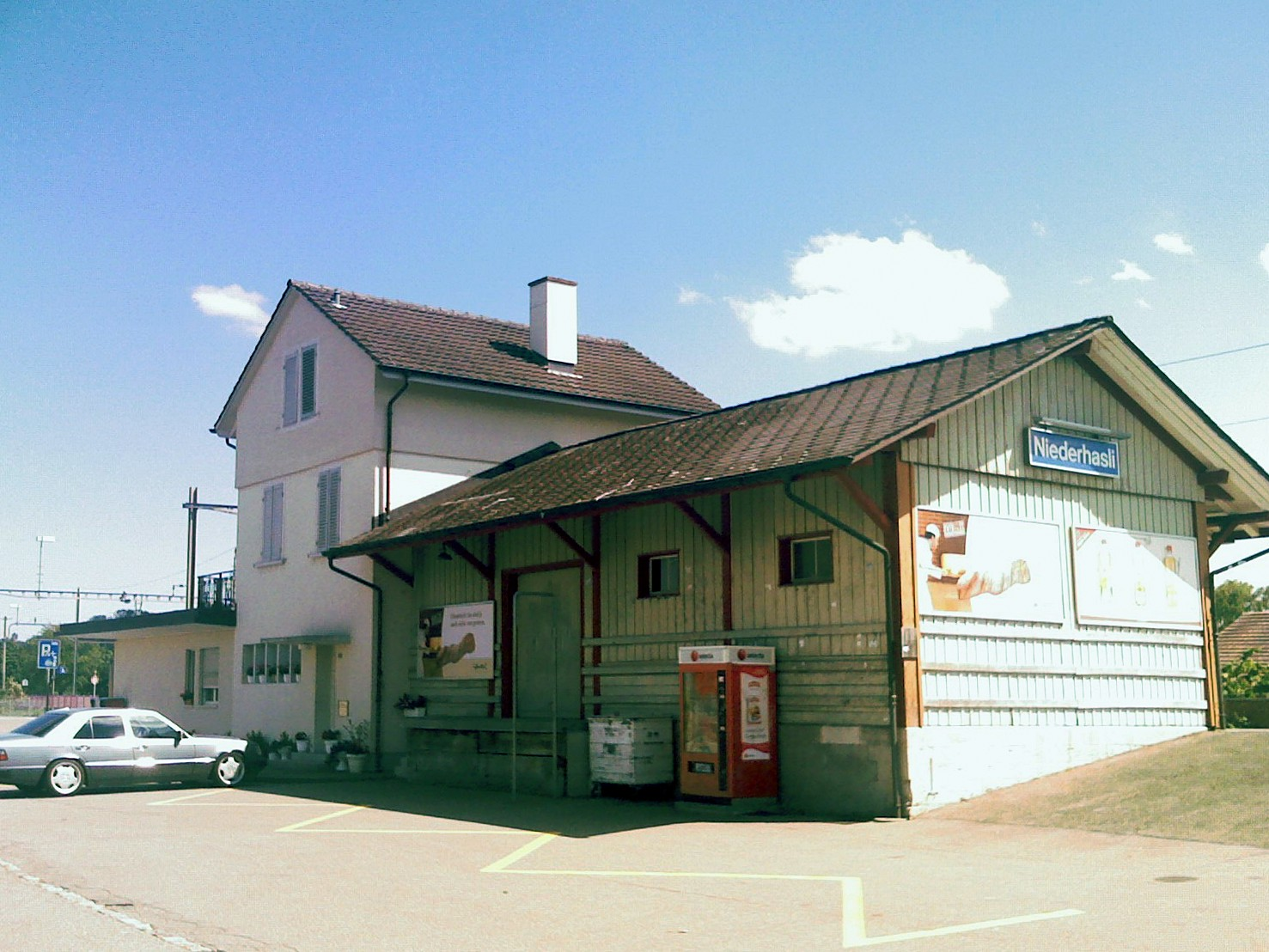
- The station building in 2009

General information
- Location: Stationstrasse; Niederhasli; Switzerland
- Coordinates: 47°28′42″N 8°29′19″E
- Elevation: 424 m (1,391 ft)
- Owner: Swiss Federal Railways
- Line: Wehntal line
- Distance: 15.1 km (9.4 mi) from Zürich Hauptbahnhof
- Platforms: 1 side platform
- Tracks: 1
- Train operators: Swiss Federal Railways
- Connections: PostAuto buses 533 534

Other information
- Fare zone: 112 (ZVV)

Passengers
- 2018: 2,600 per weekday

Services
Preceding station	Zurich S-Bahn	Following station
Dielsdorf towards Niederweningen	S15	Oberglatt towards Rapperswil
Location
- Location within Switzerland Location within Canton of Zurich

Niederhasli railway station is a railway station in the municipality of Niederhasli in the canton of Zurich, Switzerland. It is situated on the Wehntal line, within fare zone 112 of the Zürcher Verkehrsverbund (ZVV).

In the three-story station building is a home, which is currently occupied as of 2023.

== Services ==
Niederhasli railway station is served by S-Bahn trains only. It is an intermediate stop of Zurich S-Bahn line S15, which runs between Niederweningen and Rapperswil-Jona via Zurich. As of the December 2020 timetable change, the following services stop at Dielsdorf:

- Zurich S-Bahn S15: half-hourly service between Niederweningen and Rapperswil, via Zürich HB.

The railway station is also served by regional buses of PostAuto.

== See also ==
- Rail transport in Switzerland
