= Schöfflisdorf-Oberweningen railway station =

Railway station in Switzerland

Schöfflisdorf-Oberweningen
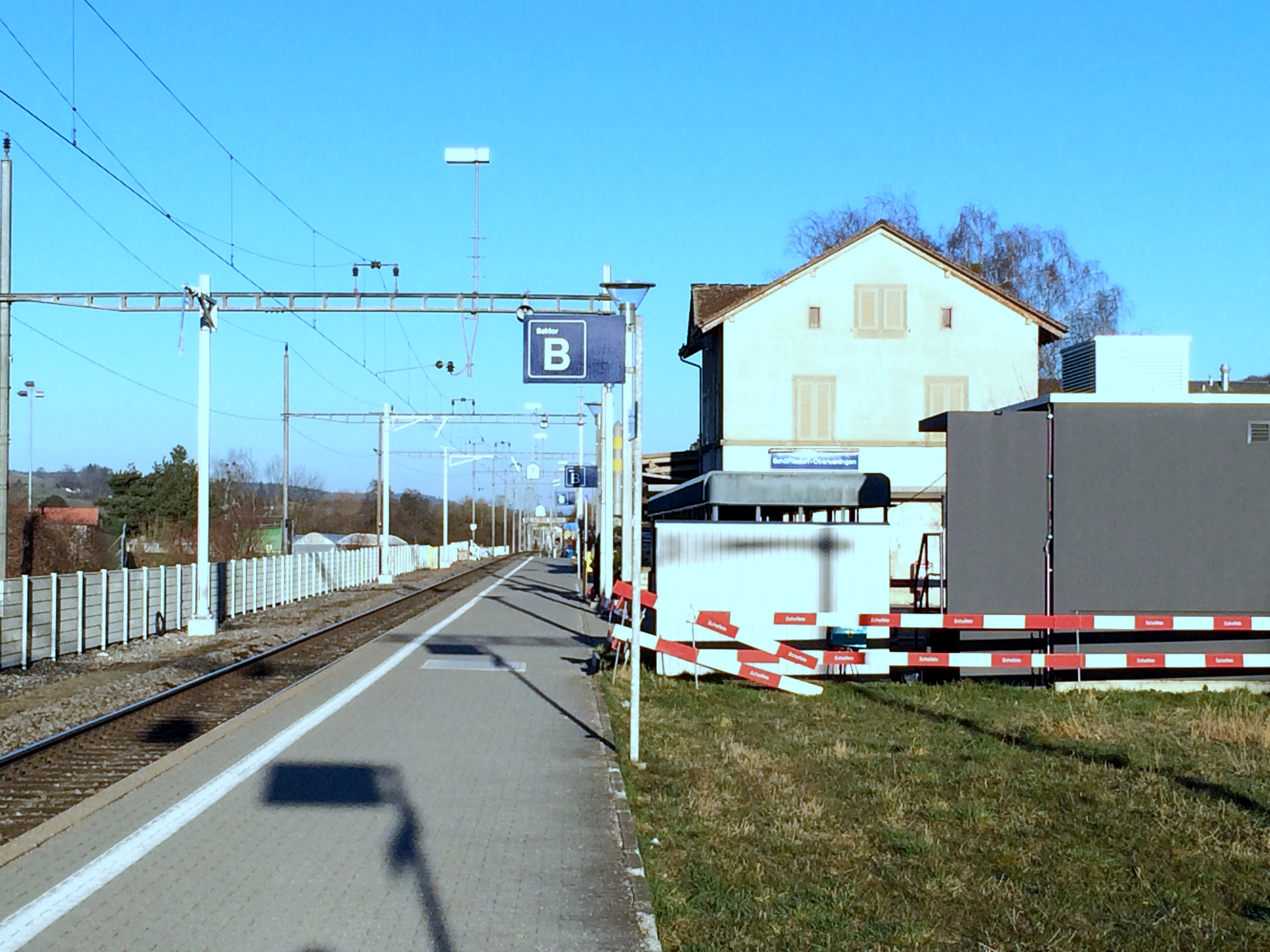
- The station in 2015

General information
- Location: Schöfflisdorf; Switzerland
- Coordinates: 47°29′53″N 8°24′42″E
- Elevation: 461 m (1,512 ft)
- Owner: Swiss Federal Railways
- Line: Wehntal line
- Distance: 21.7 km (13.5 mi) from Zürich Hauptbahnhof
- Platforms: 1 side platform
- Tracks: 1
- Train operators: Swiss Federal Railways
- Connections: PostAuto Schweiz bus route 555

Other information
- Fare zone: 117 (ZVV)

Passengers
- 2018: 1,500 per weekday

Services
Preceding station	Zurich S-Bahn	Following station
Niederweningen Dorf towards Niederweningen	S15	Steinmaur towards Rapperswil
Location
- Location within Switzerland Location within Canton of Zurich

Schöfflisdorf-Oberweningen railway station is a railway station in the municipality of Schöfflisdorf in the Swiss canton of Zurich. The station takes its name from this municipality and the adjoining municipality of Oberweningen. It is located on the Wehntal line, within fare zone 117 of the Zürcher Verkehrsverbund (ZVV).

== Facilities ==
The old station building from the Swiss Northeastern Railway is still standing, but is disused. A waiting room and bike racks are from 1990 when the Zurich S-Bahn was inaugurated. In the front of the station is the turning loop for the bus.

== Services ==
=== S-Bahn ===
Schöfflisdorf-Oberweningen railway station is served by S-Bahn trains only. It is an intermediate stop of Zurich S-Bahn line S15, which runs between Niederweningen and Rapperswil-Jona via Zurich. As of the December 2020 timetable change, the following services stop at the station:

- Zurich S-Bahn S15: half-hourly service between Niederweningen and Rapperswil, via Zürich HB.

=== Bus ===
PostAuto bus line 555 departs from the turning loop north of the station. It connects the station with Oberweningen and Schleinikon. The bus line is only operating Monday through Friday during peak hours.

== See also ==
- Rail transport in Switzerland
