= Steinmaur railway station =

Railway station

Steinmaur
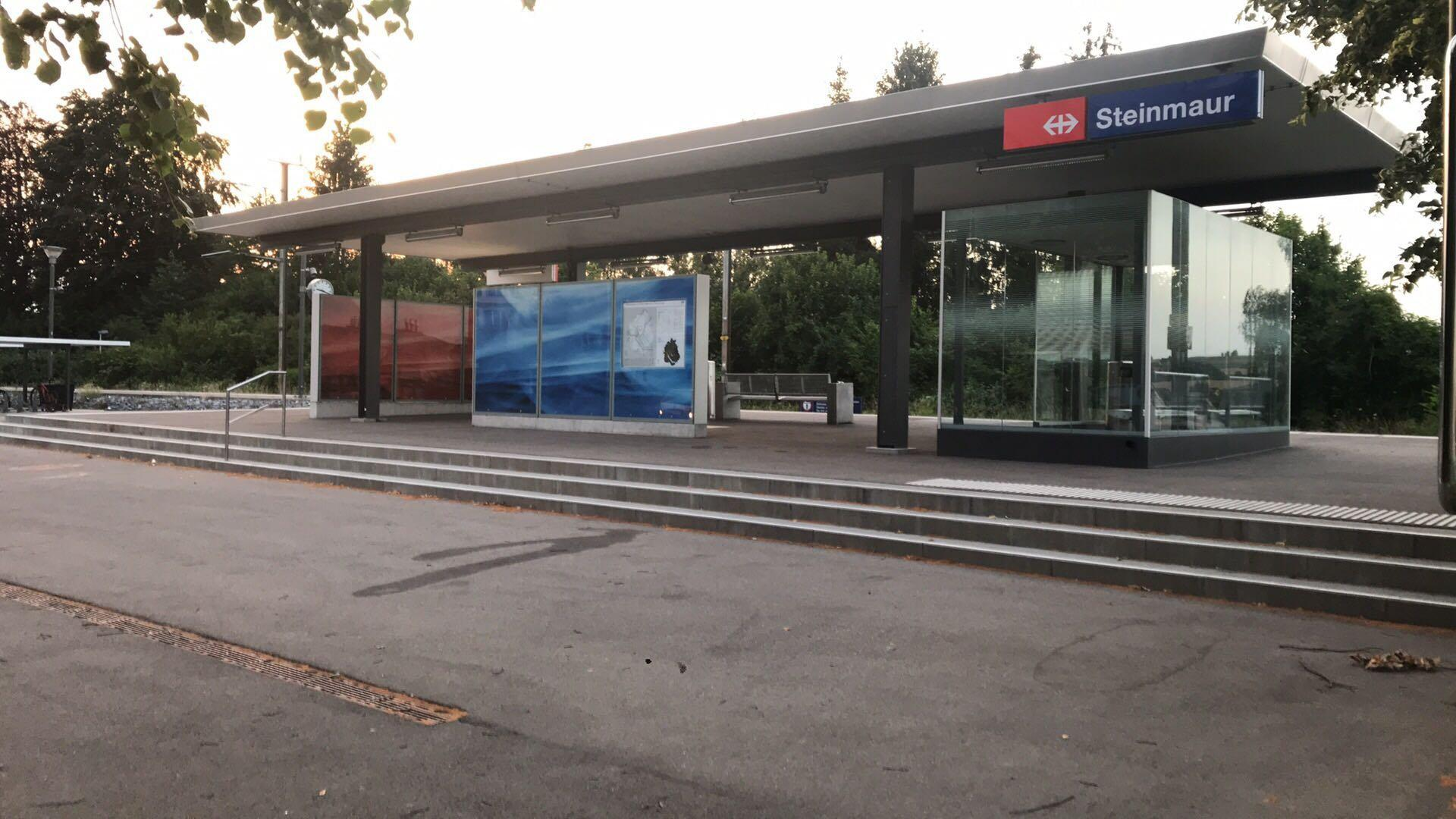
- The station in 2018

General information
- Location: Steinmaur; Switzerland
- Coordinates: 47°29′24″N 8°26′49″E
- Elevation: 451 m (1,480 ft)
- Owner: Swiss Federal Railways
- Line: Wehntal line
- Distance: 18.8 km (11.7 mi) from Zürich Hauptbahnhof
- Platforms: 1 side platform
- Tracks: 1
- Train operators: Swiss Federal Railways
- Connections: PostAuto Schweiz bus routes 535

Other information
- Fare zone: 112 (ZVV)

Passengers
- 2018: 1,300 per weekday

Services
Preceding station	Zurich S-Bahn	Following station
Schöfflisdorf-Oberweningen towards Niederweningen	S15	Dielsdorf towards Rapperswil
Location
- Location within Switzerland Location within Canton of Zurich

Steinmaur railway station (German: Bahnhof Steinmaur) is a railway station in the municipality of Steinmaur, in the Swiss canton of Zurich. It is an intermediate stop on the standard gauge Wehntal line of Swiss Federal Railways. The station lies within fare zone 112 of the Zürcher Verkehrsverbund (ZVV).

== Services ==
Steinmaur railway station is served by S-Bahn trains only. It is an intermediate stop of Zurich S-Bahn line S15, which runs between Niederweningen and Rapperswil-Jona via Zurich. As of the December 2020 timetable change, the following services stop at Steinmaur:

- Zurich S-Bahn S15: half-hourly service between Niederweningen and Rapperswil, via Zürich HB.

== See also ==
- Rail transport in Switzerland
