= Niederhasli =

- Municipality
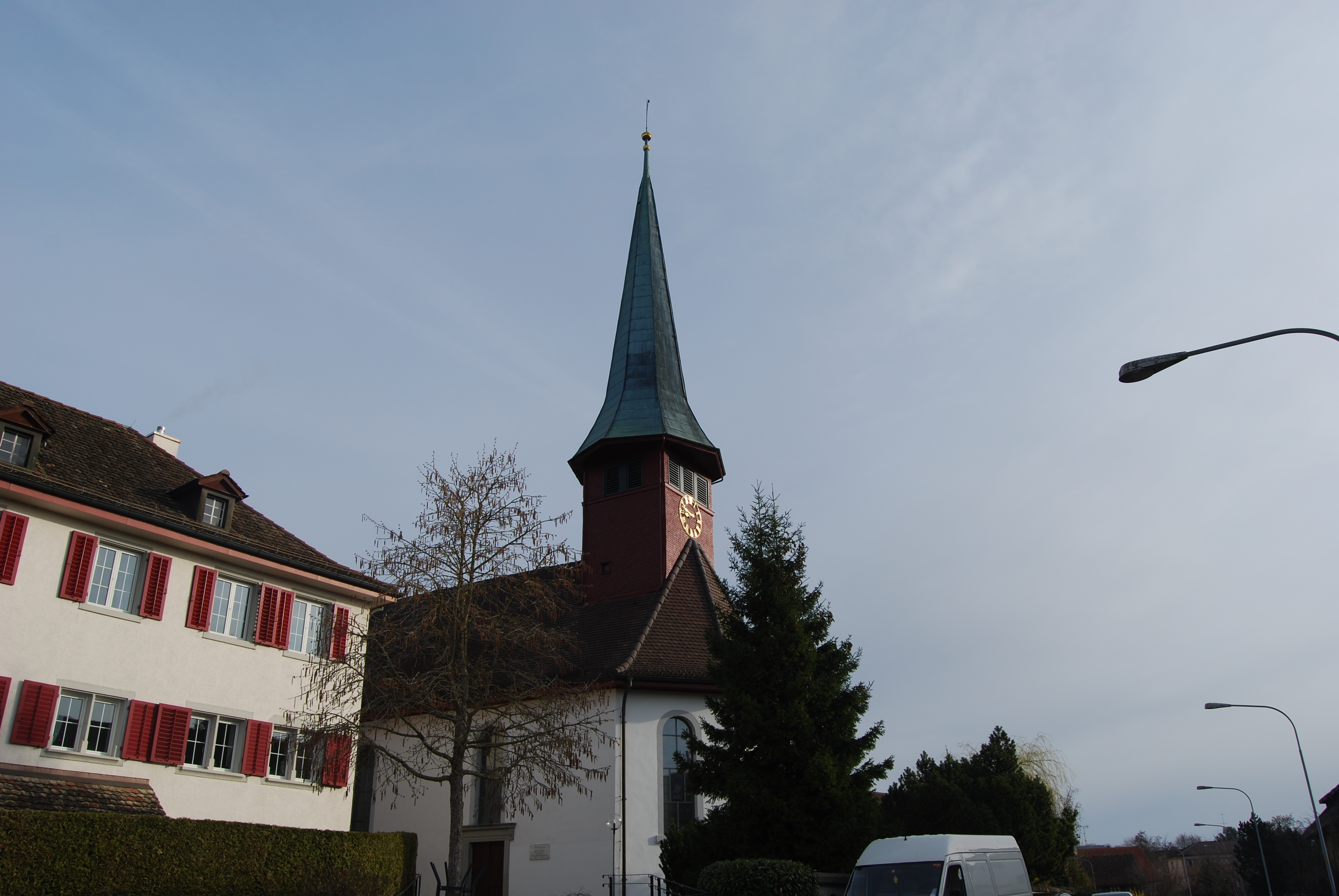

- Flag Coat of arms
- Location of Niederhasli
- Location within Switzerland Location within Canton of Zurich
- Coordinates: 47°29′N 8°29′E
- Country: Switzerland
- Canton: Zurich
- District: Dielsdorf

Area
  - Total: 11.24 km^{2} (4.34 sq mi)
- Elevation: 418 m (1,371 ft)

Population (December 2020)
  - Total: 9,449
  - Density: 840.7/km^{2} (2,177/sq mi)
- Time zone: UTC+01:00 (CET)
  - Summer (DST): UTC+02:00 (CEST)
- Postal code: 8155
- SFOS number: 90
- ISO 3166 code: CH-ZH
- Surrounded by: Buchs, Dielsdorf, Niederglatt, Oberglatt, Regensdorf, Rümlang, Steinmaur Oberhasli
- Website: www.niederhasli.ch

Niederhasli is a municipality in the district of Dielsdorf in the canton of Zürich in Switzerland.

== History ==
Niederhasli is first mentioned in 931 as Hasila.

On 10 January 2000, Crossair Flight 498 crashed in Niederhasli after taking off from Zurich Airport, killing all 10 people on board. The accident was caused by pilot error which lead to loss of control of the aircraft.

== Geography ==
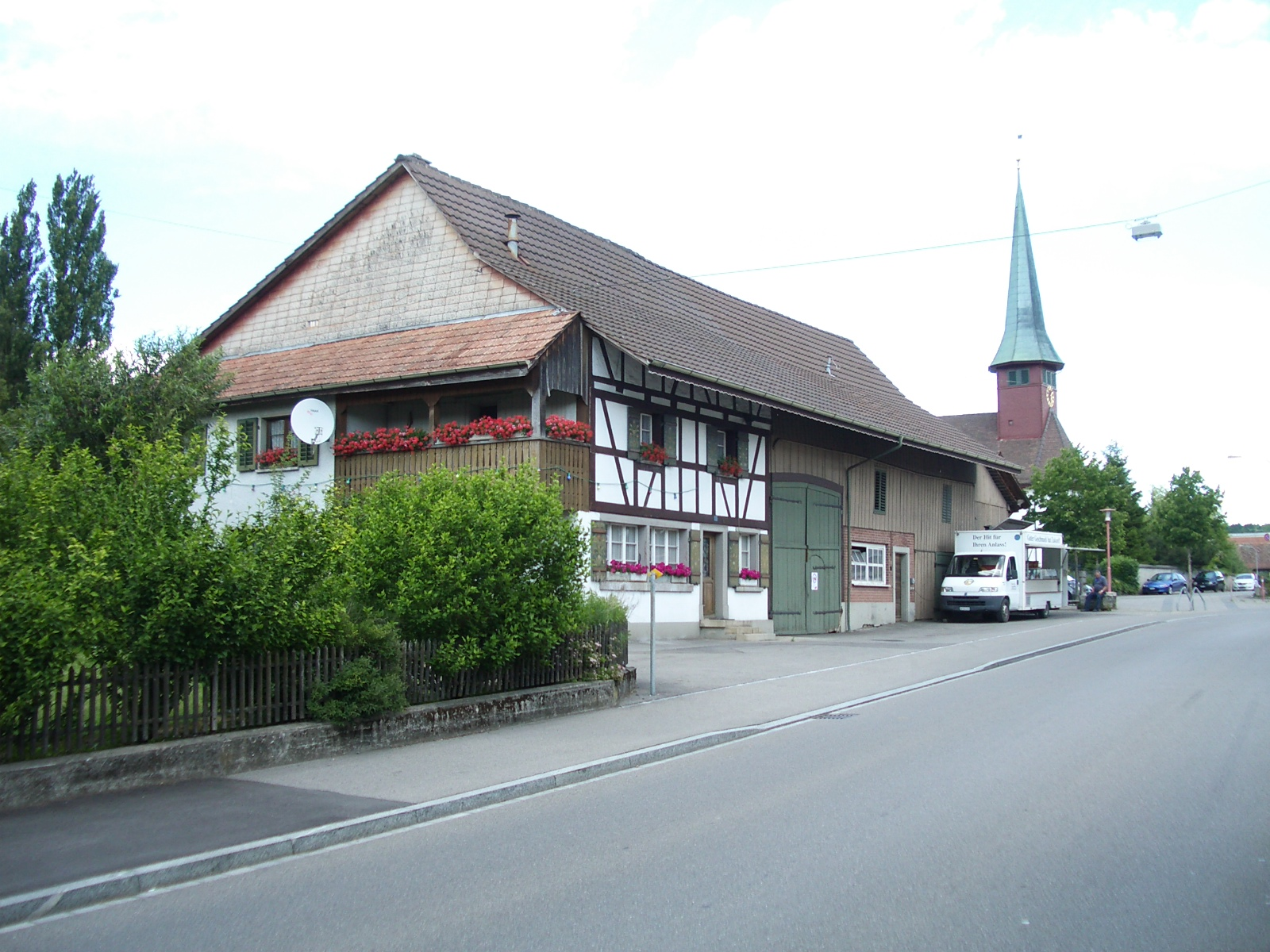
A house in Niederhasli with the church steeple behind it

Aerial view by Walter Mittelholzer (1932)

Niederhasli has an area of 11.3 km^{2} (4.4 sq mi). Of this area, 58.3% is used for agricultural purposes, while 21.5% is forested. Of the rest of the land, 18.7% is settled (buildings or roads) and the remainder (1.5%) is non-productive (rivers, glaciers or mountains).

The municipality is located in the lower Glatttal near the entrance to the Wehntal. It includes the villages of Niederhasli, Oberhasli, Mettmenhasli and Nassenwil. Before 1840 it also included the village of Niederglatt, which became an independent municipality at that time.

== Demographics ==
Niederhasli has a population (as of 31 December 2020) of 9,449. As of 2007, 22.6% of the population was made up of foreign nationals. Over the last 10 years the population has grown at a rate of 18.9%. Most of the population (as of 2000) speaks German (83.9%), with Italian being second most common ( 4.7%) and Albanian being third ( 2.4%).

In the 2007 election the most popular party was the SVP which received 43.8% of the vote. The next three most popular parties were the SPS (15.4%), the CVP (11.9%) and the FDP (9.5%).

The age distribution of the population (as of 2000) is children and teenagers (0–19 years old) make up 25.9% of the population, while adults (20–64 years old) make up 66.9% and seniors (over 64 years old) make up 7.2%. In Niederhasli about 75.8% of the population (between age 25–64) have completed either non-mandatory upper secondary education or additional higher education (either university or a Fachhochschule).

Niederhasli has an unemployment rate of 2.82%. As of 2005, there were 85 people employed in the primary economic sector and about 36 businesses involved in this sector. 573 people are employed in the secondary sector and there are 59 businesses in this sector. 1016 people are employed in the tertiary sector, with 186 businesses in this sector.

The historical population is given in the following table:

year	population
1634	502
1850	1,046
1900	876
1950	1,072
1980	5,057
2000	7,589

== Transport ==
Niederhasli railway station is a stop of the Zürich S-Bahn on the line S15. It is a 20-minute ride from Zürich Hauptbahnhof.
