= Niederweningen Dorf railway station =

Railway station in Switzerland

Niederweningen Dorf
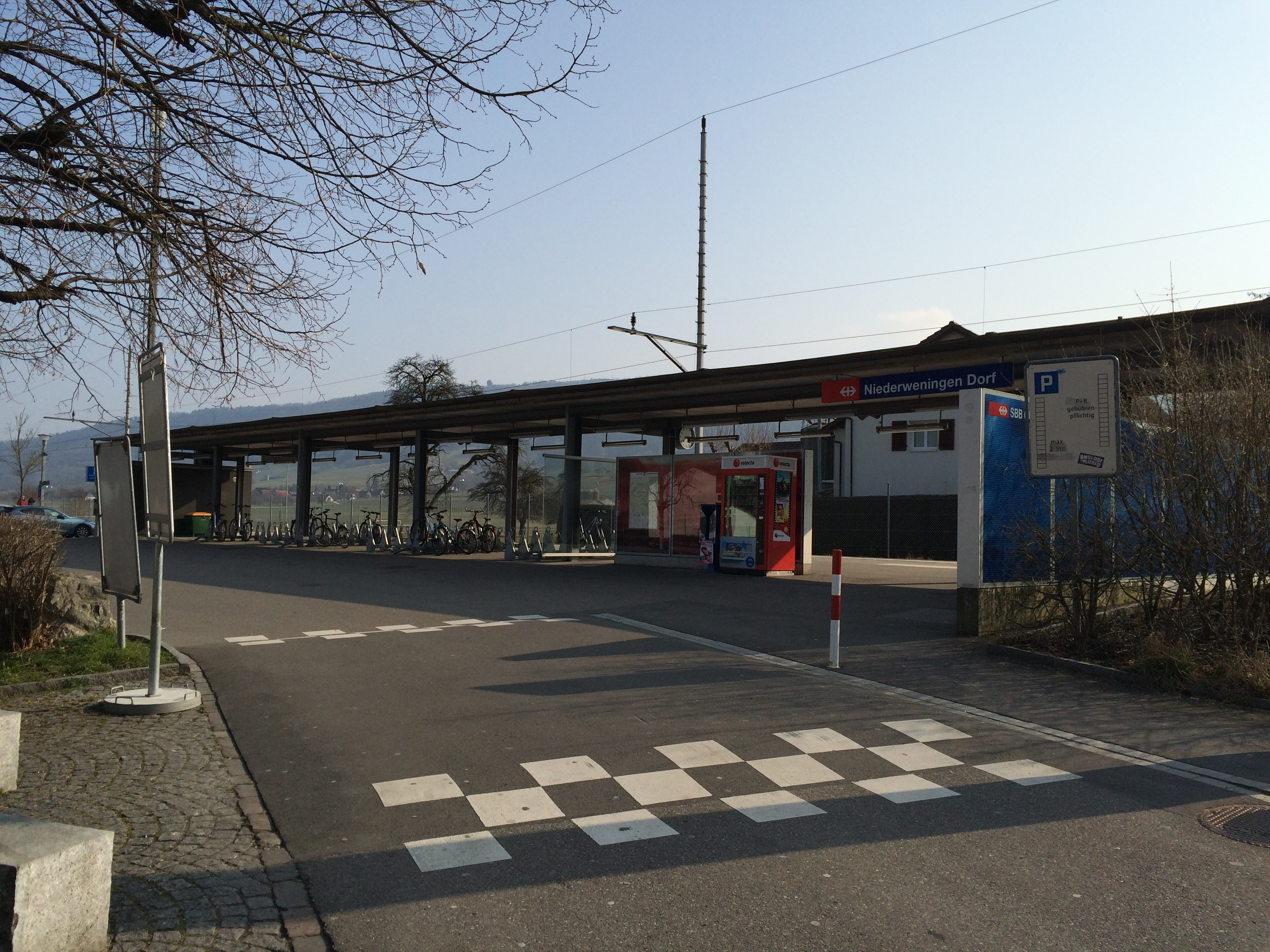
- The station in 2015

General information
- Location: Niederweningen; Switzerland
- Coordinates: 47°30′21″N 8°22′52″E
- Elevation: 452 m (1,483 ft)
- Owner: Swiss Federal Railways
- Line: Wehntal line
- Distance: 24.1 km (15.0 mi) from Zürich Hauptbahnhof
- Platforms: 1 side platform
- Tracks: 1
- Train operators: Swiss Federal Railways

Other information
- Fare zone: 117 (ZVV)

Passengers
- 2018: 1,100 per weekday

Services
Preceding station	Zurich S-Bahn	Following station
Niederweningen Terminus	S15	Schöfflisdorf-Oberweningen towards Rapperswil
Location
- Location within Switzerland Location within Canton of Zurich

Niederweningen Dorf railway station is a railway station in the Swiss canton of Zurich and municipality of Niederweningen. The station is located close to the centre of the municipality, on the Wehntal railway line, within fare zone 117 of the Zürcher Verkehrsverbund (ZVV).

The station is located 350 m (1,150 ft) away from the Mammoth Museum.

== History ==
Niederweningen Dorf station was opened in 1891 as the terminus of the Swiss Northeastern Railway's Wehntal line, and was originally simply known as Niederweningen station. In 1938 the line was extended by a further 1 kilometre (0.62 mi) to the cantonal border and a new terminus created. The new terminus took the name of Niederweningen station, and the previous terminus became a through station by the name of Niederweningen Dorf.

== Services ==
Niederweningen Dorf railway station is served by Zurich S-Bahn line S15. As of the December 2020 timetable change, the following services stop at the station:

- Zurich S-Bahn S15: half-hourly service between Niederweningen and Rapperswil via Zürich HB.

== See also ==
- Rail transport in Switzerland
