= Schöfflisdorf =

- Municipality
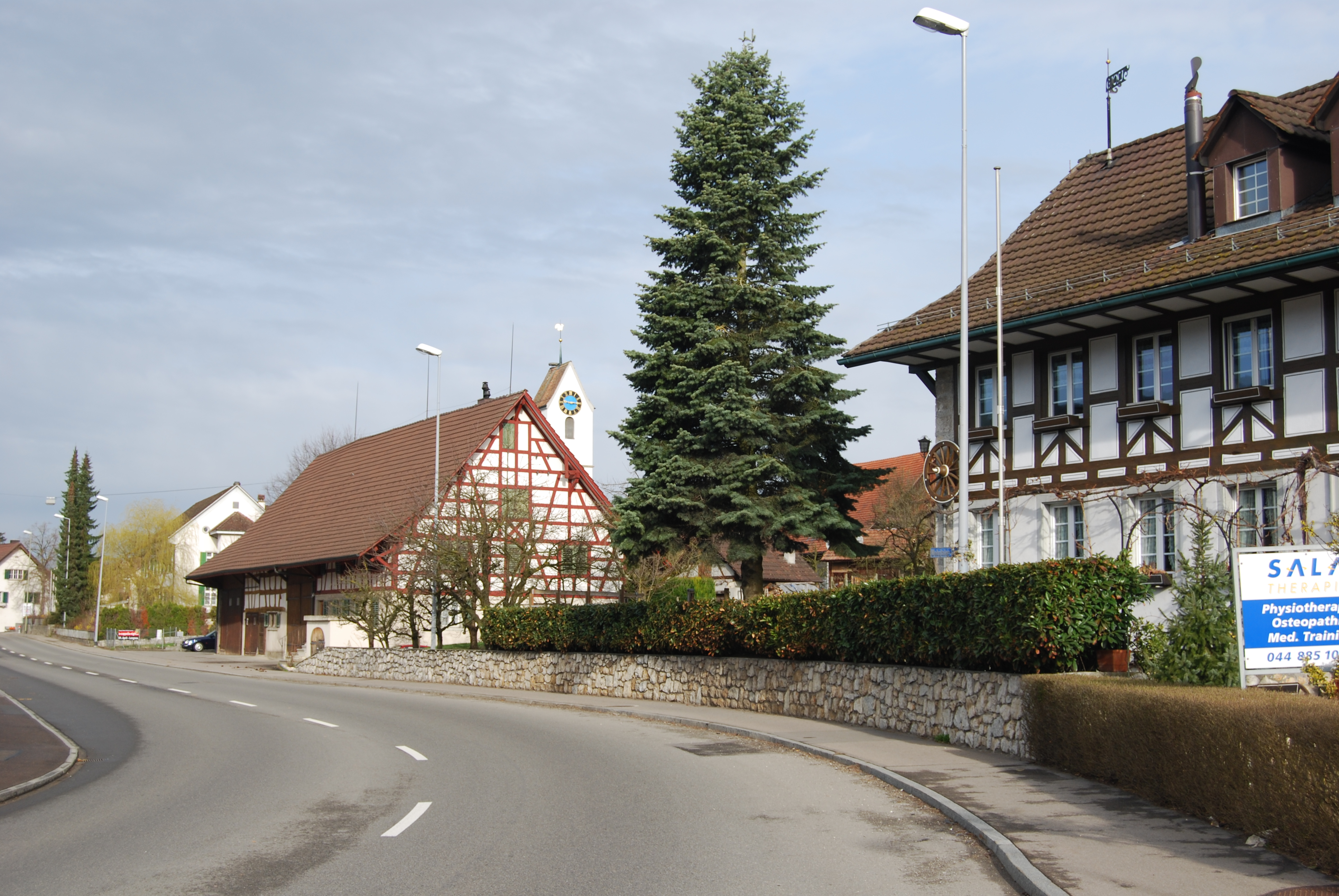

- Flag Coat of arms
- Location of Schöfflisdorf
- Location within Switzerland Location within Canton of Zürich
- Coordinates: 47°29′N 8°25′E
- Country: Switzerland
- Canton: Zürich
- District: Dielsdorf

Area
  - Total: 4.05 km^{2} (1.56 sq mi)
- Elevation: 471 m (1,545 ft)

Population (December 2020)
  - Total: 1,394
  - Density: 344/km^{2} (891/sq mi)
- Time zone: UTC+01:00 (CET)
  - Summer (DST): UTC+02:00 (CEST)
- Postal code: 8165
- SFOS number: 99
- ISO 3166 code: CH-ZH
- Surrounded by: Bachs, Oberweningen, Steinmaur
- Twin towns: Missolonghi (Greece)
- Website: www.schoefflisdorf.ch

Schöfflisdorf is a municipality in the district of Dielsdorf in the canton of Zürich in Switzerland.

== Geography ==
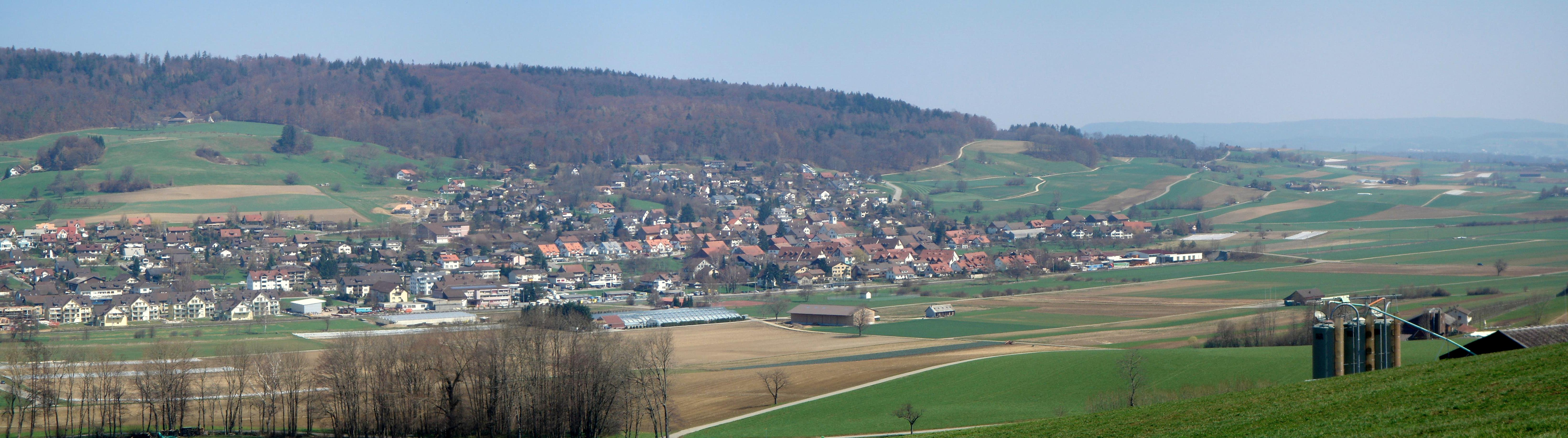
Schöfflisdorf

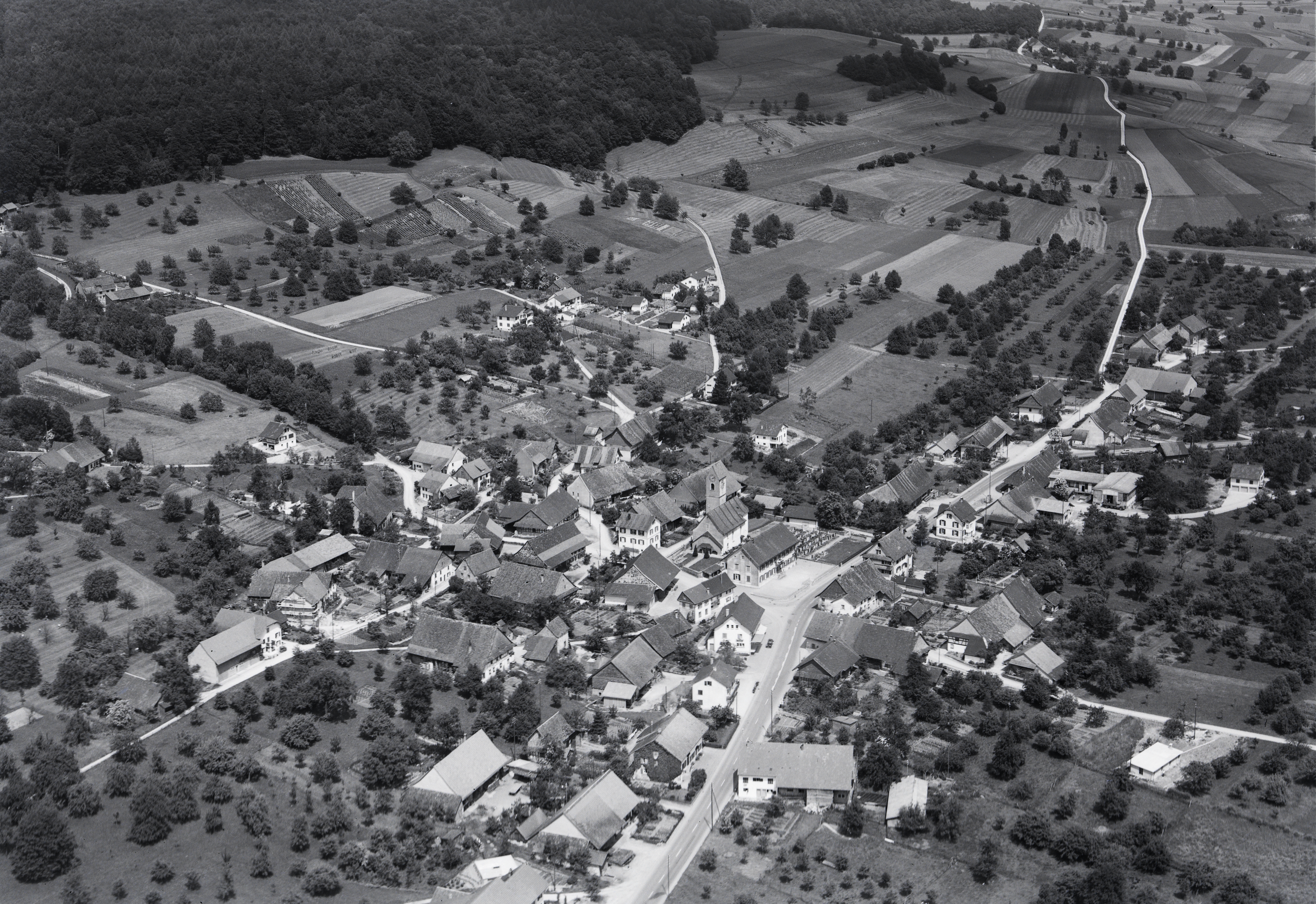
Aerial view (1958)

Situated in the Wehntal, Schöfflisdorf has an area of 4 km^{2} (1.5 sq mi). Of this area, 43.2% is used for agricultural purposes, while 45.2% is forested. Of the rest of the land, 11.3% is settled (buildings or roads) and the remainder (0.3%) is non-productive (rivers, glaciers or mountains).

== Demographics ==
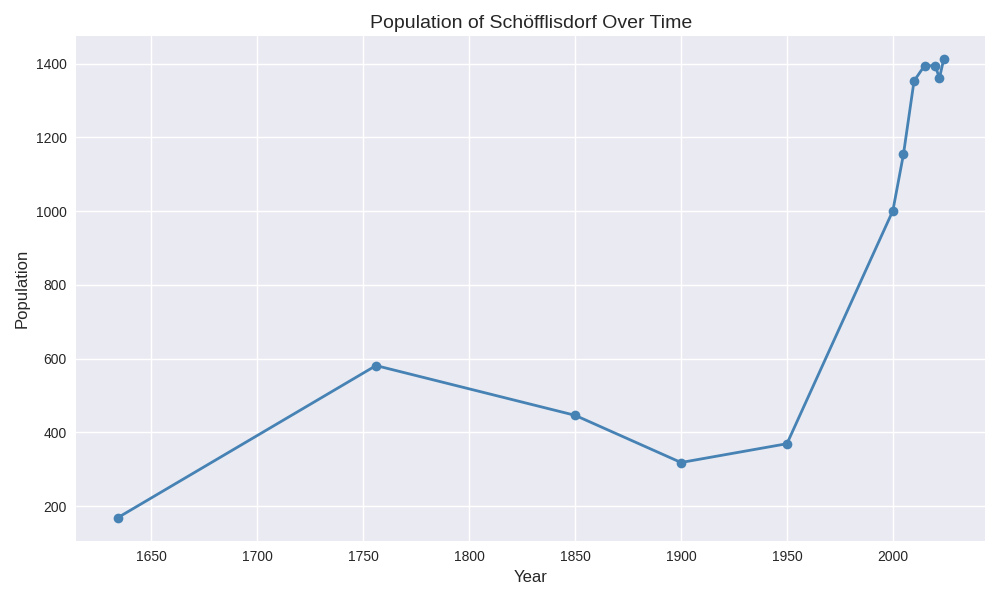
Historic population of Schöfflisdorf (1630-2024

Schöfflisdorf has a population (as of 31 December 2020) of 1,394. As of 2007, 9.8% of the population was made up of foreign nationals. Over the last 10 years the population has grown at a rate of 10.4%. Most of the population (as of 2000) speaks German (92.2%), with Albanian being second most common ( 2.0%) and Italian being third ( 1.4%).

In the 2007 election the most popular party was the SVP which received 42.9% of the vote. The next three most popular parties were the FDP (13%), the SPS (11%) and the CSP (10.6%).

The age distribution of the population (as of 2000) is children and teenagers (0–19 years old) make up 22.6% of the population, while adults (20–64 years old) make up 65.3% and seniors (over 64 years old) make up 12.1%. In Schöfflisdorf about 82.9% of the population (between age 25-64) have completed either non-mandatory upper secondary education or additional higher education (either university or a Fachhochschule).

Schöfflisdorf has an unemployment rate of 1.64%. As of 2005, there were 21 people employed in the primary economic sector and about 9 businesses involved in this sector. 69 people are employed in the secondary sector and there are 17 businesses in this sector. 185 people are employed in the tertiary sector, with 44 businesses in this sector.

== Transport ==
Schöfflisdorf-Oberweningen railway station is a stop of the Zürich S-Bahn on the line S15 (ZVV). It is a 29-minute ride from Zürich Hauptbahnhof.

== International relations ==
=== Twin towns — Sister cities ===
Schöfflisdorf is twinned with:

- Missolonghi, Greece

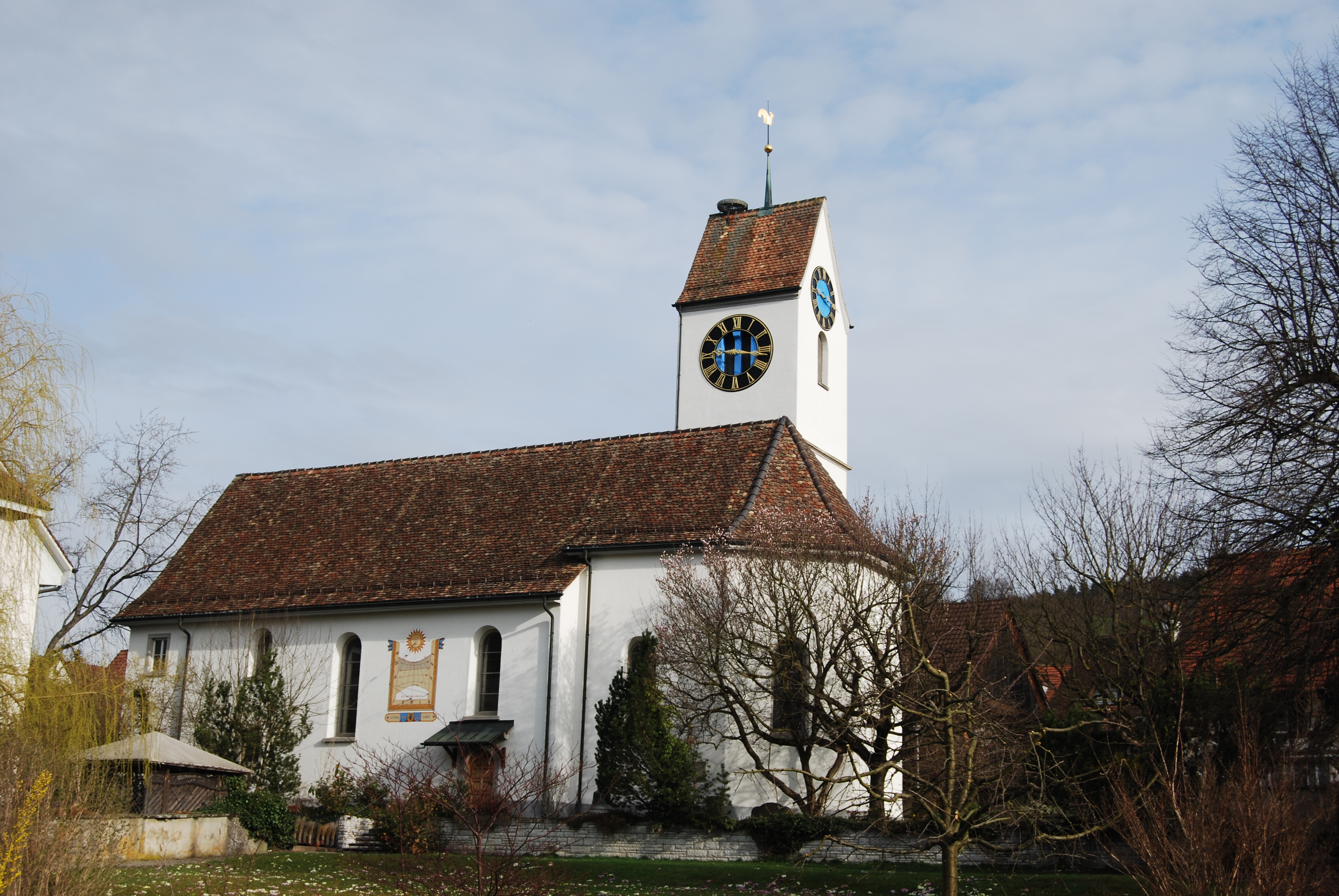
Church of Schöfflisdorf
