= S55 (ZVV) =

Former line of the Zurich S-Bahn

The S55 was a regional railway service of the S-Bahn Zürich in Switzerland on the Zürcher Verkehrsverbund (ZVV), Zürich transportation network.

Until timetable change in late 2015, the S55 linked Niederweningen and Oberglatt, as a short-working of the then routing of service S5. With the timetable change, the service S55 was dropped altogether, and service S5 was diverted away from Niederweningen. Service on this stretch of line is now provided by service S15.
