= Steinmaur =

- Municipality
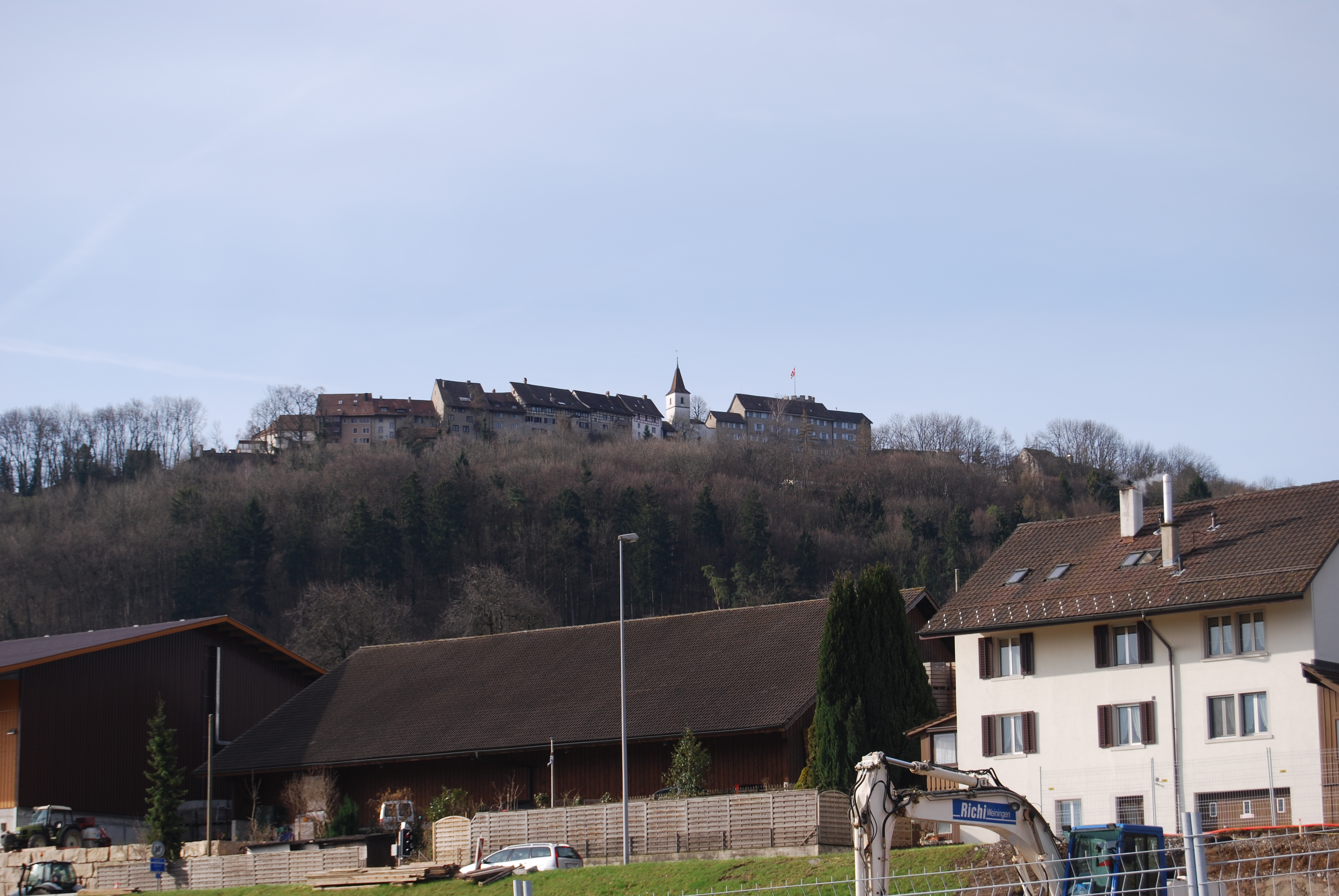

- Flag Coat of arms
- Location of Steinmaur
- Location within Switzerland Location within Canton of Zurich
- Coordinates: 47°30′N 8°27′E
- Country: Switzerland
- Canton: Zurich
- District: Dielsdorf

Area
  - Total: 9.39 km^{2} (3.63 sq mi)
- Elevation: 451 m (1,480 ft)

Population (December 2020)
  - Total: 3,583
  - Density: 382/km^{2} (988/sq mi)
- Time zone: UTC+01:00 (CET)
  - Summer (DST): UTC+02:00 (CEST)
- Postal code: 8162
- SFOS number: 101
- ISO 3166 code: CH-ZH
- Surrounded by: Bachs, Dielsdorf, Neerach, Niederglatt, Niederhasli, Oberweningen, Regensberg, Schöfflisdorf
- Website: www.steinmaur.ch

Steinmaur is a municipality in the district of Dielsdorf in the canton of Zürich in Switzerland.

== Geography ==
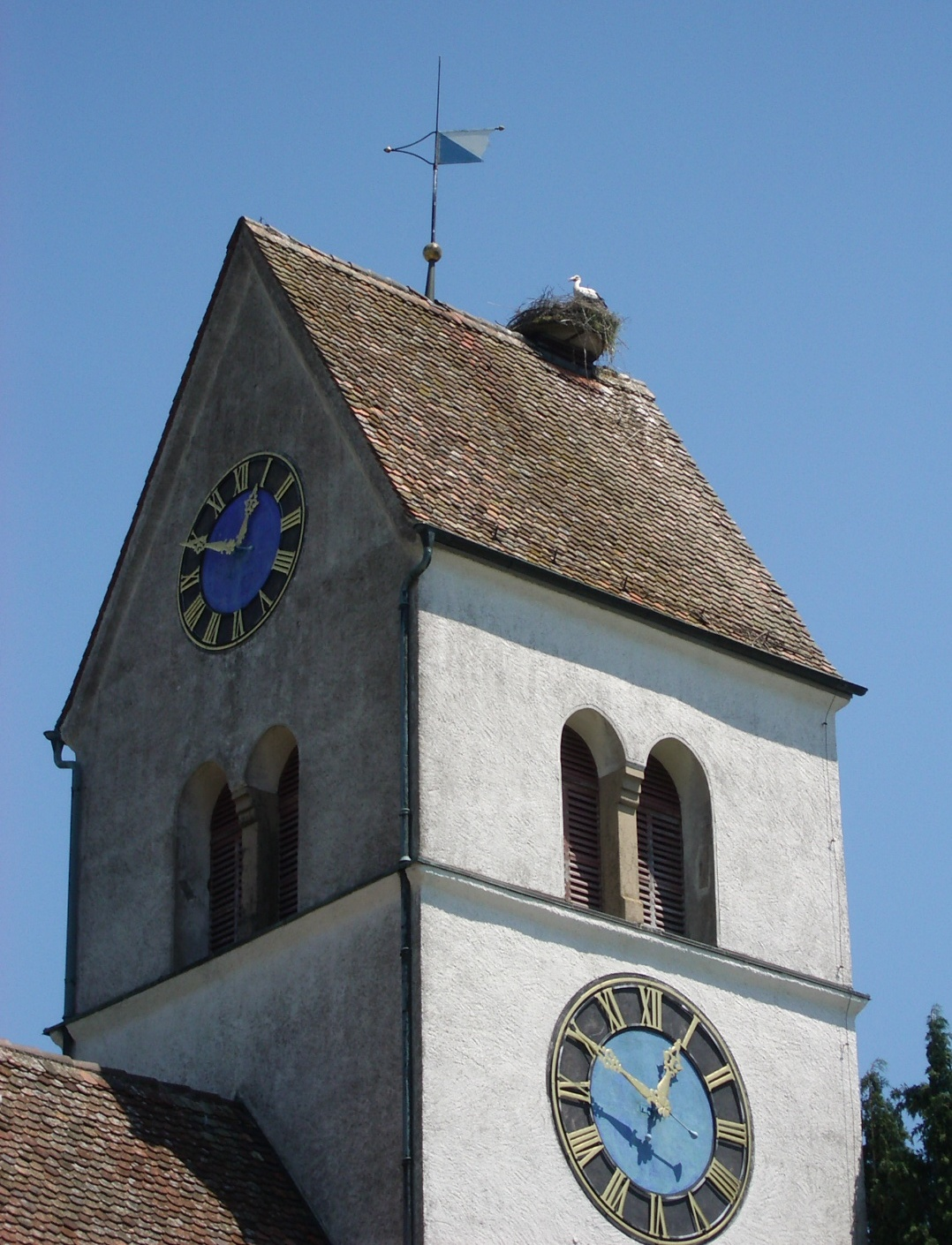
Obersteinmaur church

Situated in the Wehntal, Steinmaur has an area of 9.5 km^{2} (3.7 sq mi). Of this area, 57.1% is used for agricultural purposes, while 29.5% is forested. Of the rest of the land, 12.9% is settled (buildings or roads) and the remainder (0.5%) is non-productive (rivers, glaciers or mountains).

Aerial view (1971)

== Demographics ==
Steinmaur has a population (as of 31 December 2020) of 3,583. As of 2007, 18.4% of the population was made up of foreign nationals. Over the last 10 years the population has grown at a rate of 10.2%. Most of the population (as of 2000) speaks German (88.5%), with Italian being second most common ( 2.1%) and Albanian being third ( 1.9%).

In the 2007 election the most popular party was the SVP which received 40% of the vote. The next three most popular parties were the SPS (13.5%), the FDP (12.1%) and the Green Party (11.3%).

The age distribution of the population (as of 2000) is children and teenagers (0–19 years old) make up 22.4% of the population, while adults (20–64 years old) make up 67.3% and seniors (over 64 years old) make up 10.4%. In Steinmaur about 76.6% of the population (between age 25–64) have completed either non-mandatory upper secondary education or additional higher education (either university or a Fachhochschule).

Steinmaur has an unemployment rate of 3.01%. As of 2005, there were 151 people employed in the primary economic sector and about 32 businesses involved in this sector. 185 people are employed in the secondary sector and there are 36 businesses in this sector. 387 people are employed in the tertiary sector, with 84 businesses in this sector.

== Transport ==
Steinmaur has a station, Steinmaur, on the S15 line of the Zürich S-Bahn. It is a 26-minute ride from Zürich Hauptbahnhof.
