= Wehntal =

Valley in the canton of Zürich, Switzerland

Coordinates: 47°30′N 8°20′E

Wehntal is the name of a valley region in the Canton of Zürich in Switzerland.

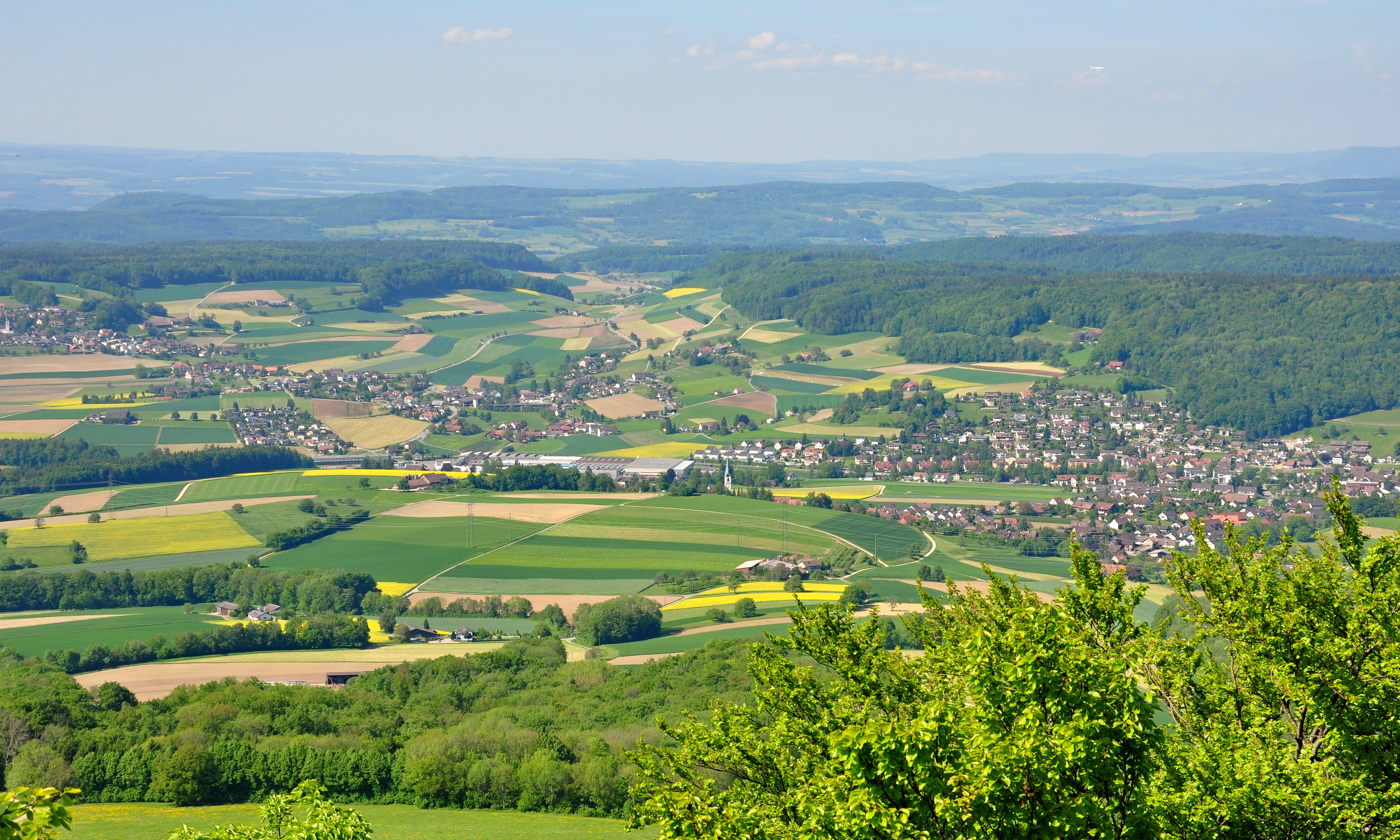
Wehntal at Niederweningen

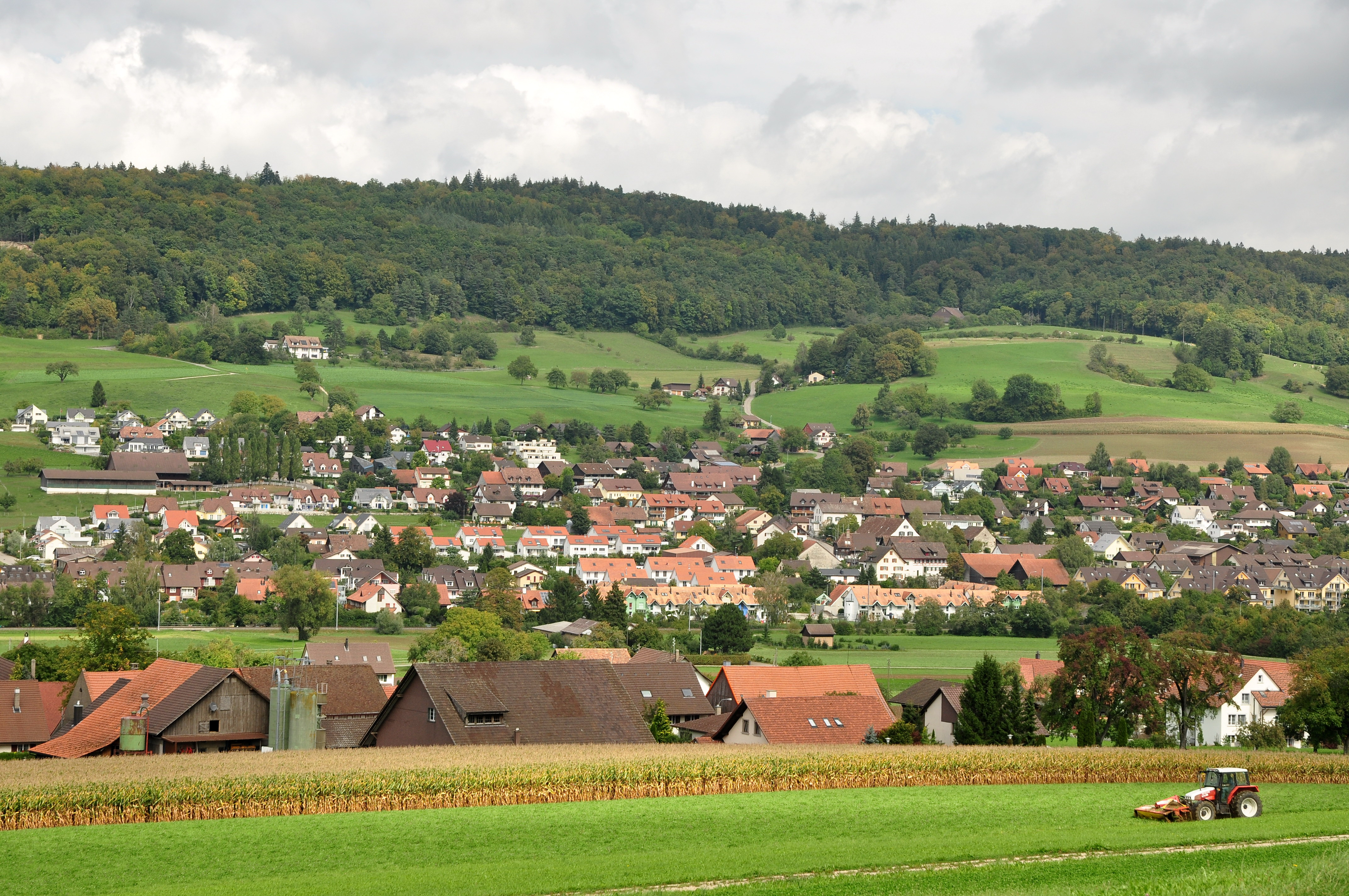
Wehntal at Oberweningen and Schleinikon

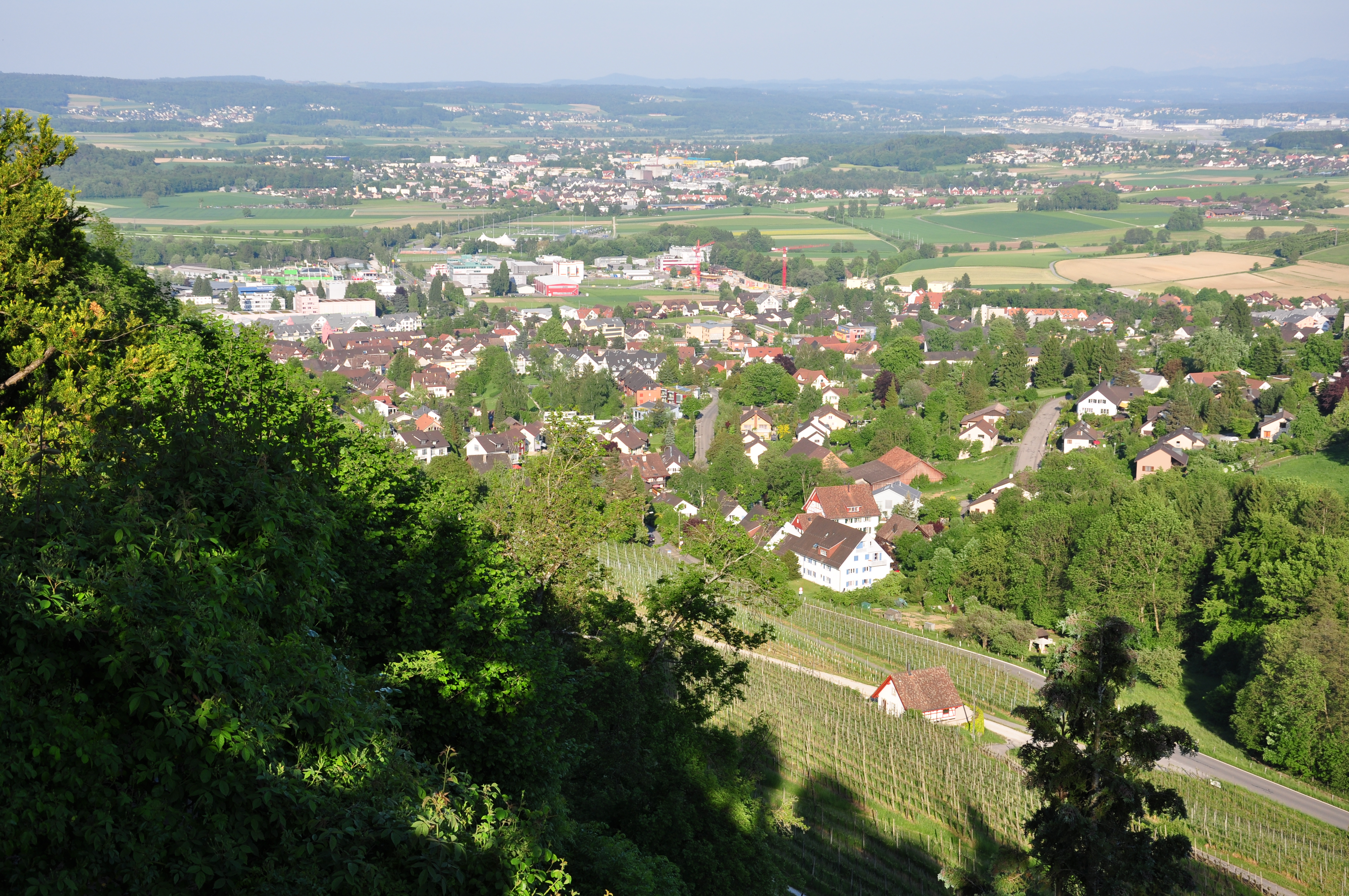
Dielsdorf and western Glatttal as seen from the Regensberg Castle

== Geography ==
The Wehn valley (native German name: Wehntal) area is situated between the Lägern and Egg mountain chain in the Dielsdorf District of the Canton of Zürich in Switzerland. To the east the valley is bounded by a moraine of the Linth glacier, respectively the lower Glatt Valley near Dielsdorf, and in the west it passes over to the border of the Canton of Aargau respectively the drainage bassin of the Surb Valley (native German name: Surbtal) and the river of the same name which rises in the Wehntal. The population of the region is expanding rapidly due to its proximity to city of Zürich and its beautiful landscape.

Wehntal comprises the area of the municipalities:

- Schöfflisdorf
- Oberweningen
- Schleinikon
- Niederweningen
- Steinmaur
- Dielsdorf

== History ==
About 185,000 years ago, a side lobe of the Walensee/Reinglacier overlapped on the threshold at the present Pfannenstiel eastern slope from Hombrechtikon into the Glatttal towards Niederweningen, and eroded the overdeepened rock rut of the present Wehntal area. During melting of the glacier, Wehntal, the lower Glatttal and Furttal filled about 180,000 to 150,000 years ago with cold glacial lakes. After another glacier maximum about 140,000 years ago, the ice melted in the last Eemian (interglacial) period back far into the alpine valleys, and great lakes with border union fens filled the former glacial basin. During the Würm glaciation and again about 45,000 years ago, mammoths and other Ice Age animals lived in the largely silted Wehntal. During the last glacial maximum about 24,000 years ago the glaciers pushed again to the lower Glatttal, but not to Wehntal. With the increasing warming period about 20,000 years ago, the glaciers melted away in stages to Zürich, later Hurden and formed the Seedamm at the Obersee lake shore respectively the Ufenau, Lützelau and Heilig Hüsli islands on Zürichsee, and finally the glaciers retreated into the alpine mountains.

In 1890 the most important site of ice animals in Switzerland was discovered in Niederweningen. Particularly the uppermost deposits with the so-called Mammut turf layer were studied up in about 5 metres (16 ft) depth, and between 1983 and 1985 by three research boreholes to a depth of 21 metres (69 ft). In 1994 a groundwater bore in Oberweningen proved that the Wehntal area originally laid at least 130 metres (430 ft) deeper than the present valley floor and had to be caused by glacial erosion. In 2003 the remains of a Mammoth were found, and further finds resulted in the establishment of the present Mammutmuseum Niederweningen.

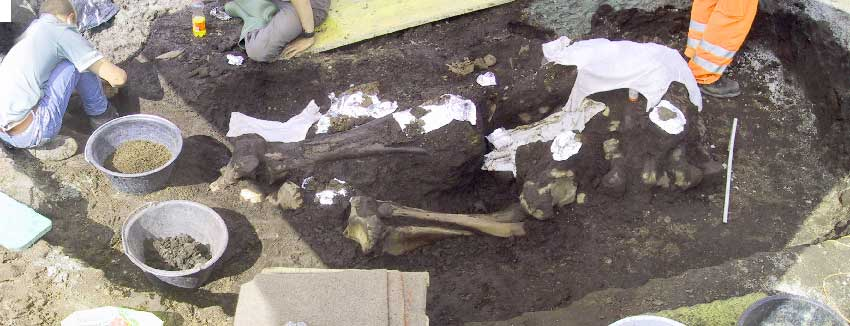
2003 Mammoth find in Niederwenigen

Archaeological finds date back to the Roman era. The term Wehn may derived from the probably Allamanic name Waninc respectively Wano, meaning Wano's valley. The heartland of the possessions of the medieval House of Regensberg was in the Furt and Wehn valleys besides the Lägern chain, where around 1050 AD the family built its ancestral seat Altburg near Zürich-Affoltern and two centuries later Neu-Regensberg on the eastern Lägern slope.

== Transportation ==
The area is part of the S-Bahn Zürich on the line S15, and around the city of Zürich provided by Verkehrsbetriebe Zürich (VBZ), the public transport operator in the city of Zurich and its suburbs.

== Literature ==
- Roger Sablonier: Adel im Wandel. Untersuchungen zur sozialen Situation des ostschweizerischen Adels um 1300. Chronos-Verlag, Zürich 1979/2000. ISBN 978-3-905313-55-0.

== See also ==
- Mammutmuseum Niederweningen
- Surbtal
