= Dielsdorf =

- Municipality
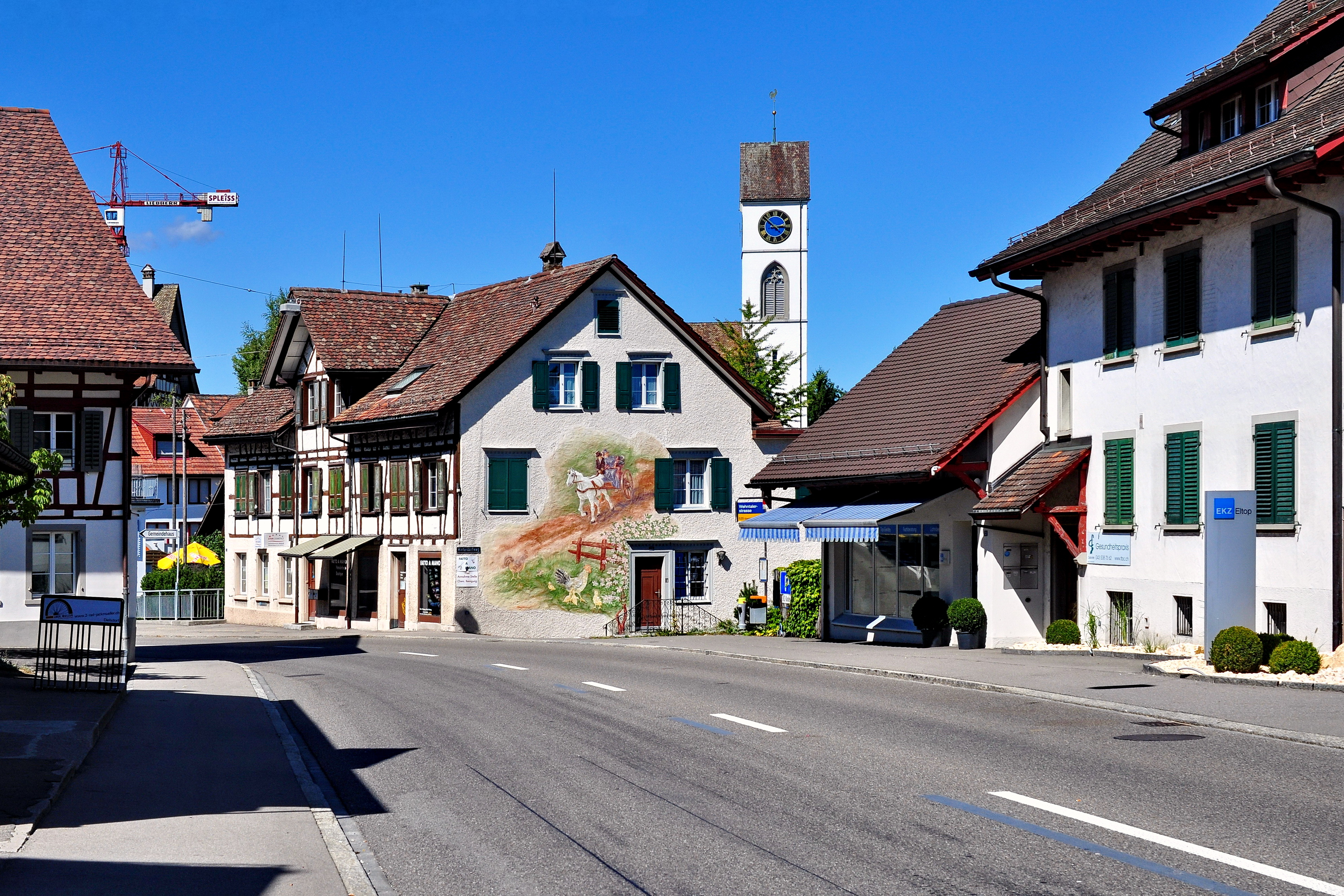

- Flag Coat of arms
- Location of Dielsdorf
- Location within Switzerland Location within Canton of Zurich
- Coordinates: 47°29′N 8°27′E
- Country: Switzerland
- Canton: Zurich
- District: Dielsdorf

Area
  - Total: 5.86 km^{2} (2.26 sq mi)
- Elevation: 455 m (1,493 ft)

Population (December 2020)
  - Total: 5,968
  - Density: 1,020/km^{2} (2,640/sq mi)
- Time zone: UTC+01:00 (CET)
  - Summer (DST): UTC+02:00 (CEST)
- Postal code: 8157
- SFOS number: 86
- ISO 3166 code: CH-ZH
- Surrounded by: Buchs, Niederhasli, Regensberg, Steinmaur
- Website: www.dielsdorf.ch

Dielsdorf (Swiss Standard German pronunciation: [ˈdiːlsdɔrf]) is a municipality, seat of the district of Dielsdorf in the canton of Zürich in Switzerland.

== History ==
Aerial view from 200 m by Walter Mittelholzer (1925)

Dielsdorf is first mentioned in 861 as Theolvesthoruf. The name means estate or farm of Theolf which is supposed to have been the original owner of these lands.

== Geography ==
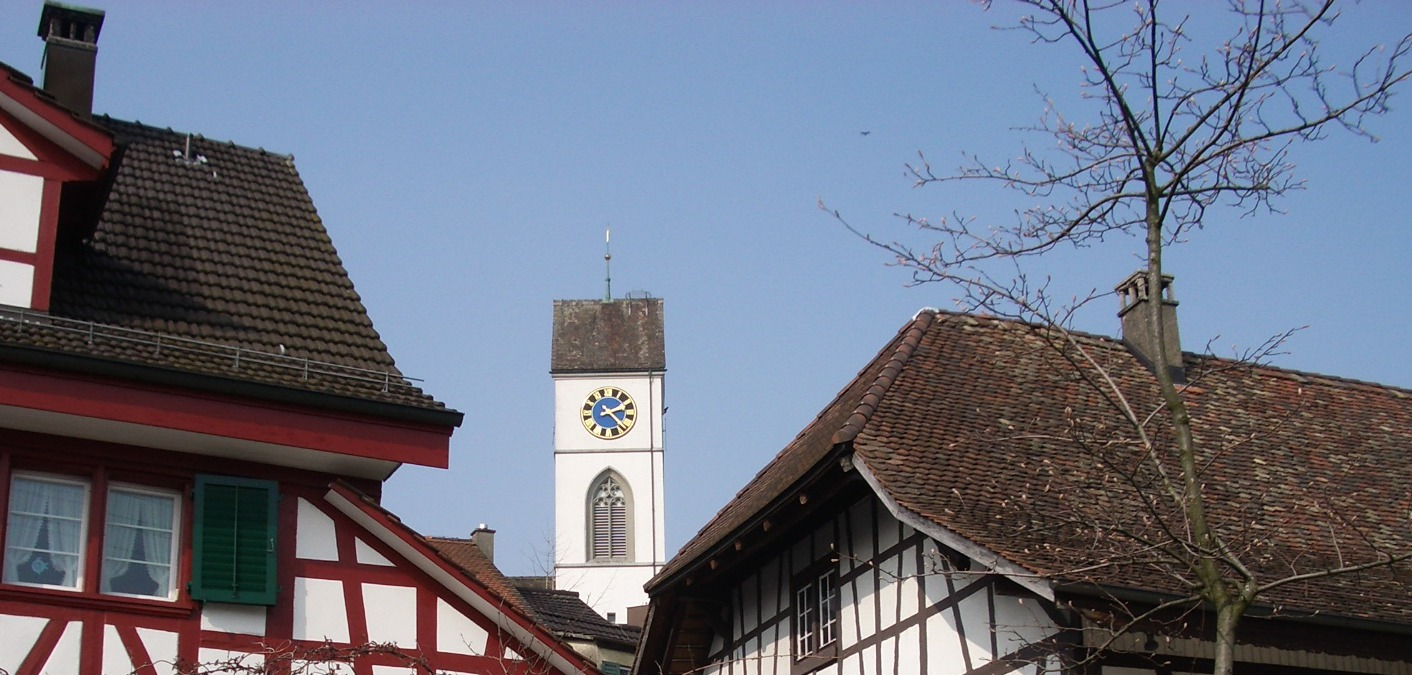

Dielsdorf has an area of 5.9 km^{2} (2.3 sq mi). Of this area, 37% is used for agricultural purposes, while 30.2% is forested. Of the rest of the land, 31% is settled (buildings or roads) and the remainder (1.9%) is non-productive (rivers, glaciers or mountains).

The municipality is located on the eastern flank of the Lägern ridge at the entrance to the Wehntal.

== Demographics ==
Dielsdorf has a population (as of 31 December 2020) of 5,968. As of 2007, 22.5% of the population was made up of foreign nationals. Over the last 10 years the population has grown at a rate of 14.8%. Most of the population (as of 2000) speaks German (84.2%), with Italian being second most common (4.0%) and Albanian being third (2.7%).

In the 2007 election the most popular party was the SVP which received 39.3% of the vote. The next three most popular parties were the SPS (17.3%), the FDP (11.7%) and the CSP (9.9%).

The age distribution of the population (as of 2000) is children and teenagers (0–19 years old) make up 25.1% of the population, while adults (20–64 years old) make up 64.9% and seniors (over 64 years old) make up 10.1%. In Dielsdorf about 73.1% of the population (between age 25–64) have completed either non-mandatory upper secondary education or additional higher education (either University or a Fachhochschule).

Dielsdorf has an unemployment rate of 3.22%. As of 2005, there were 40 people employed in the primary economic sector and about 14 businesses involved in this sector. 894 people are employed in the secondary sector and there are 55 businesses in this sector. 2471 people are employed in the tertiary sector, with 229 businesses in this sector.

The historical population is given in the following table:

year	population
1467	c. 290
1771	466
1836	642
1850	674
1900	734
1950	1,133
1960	1,556
2000	4,882

== Transport ==
Dielsdorf railway station is a stop of the Zürich S-Bahn on the line S15. Its train station is a 23-minute ride from Zürich Hauptbahnhof.
