= Fare zones of Zurich =

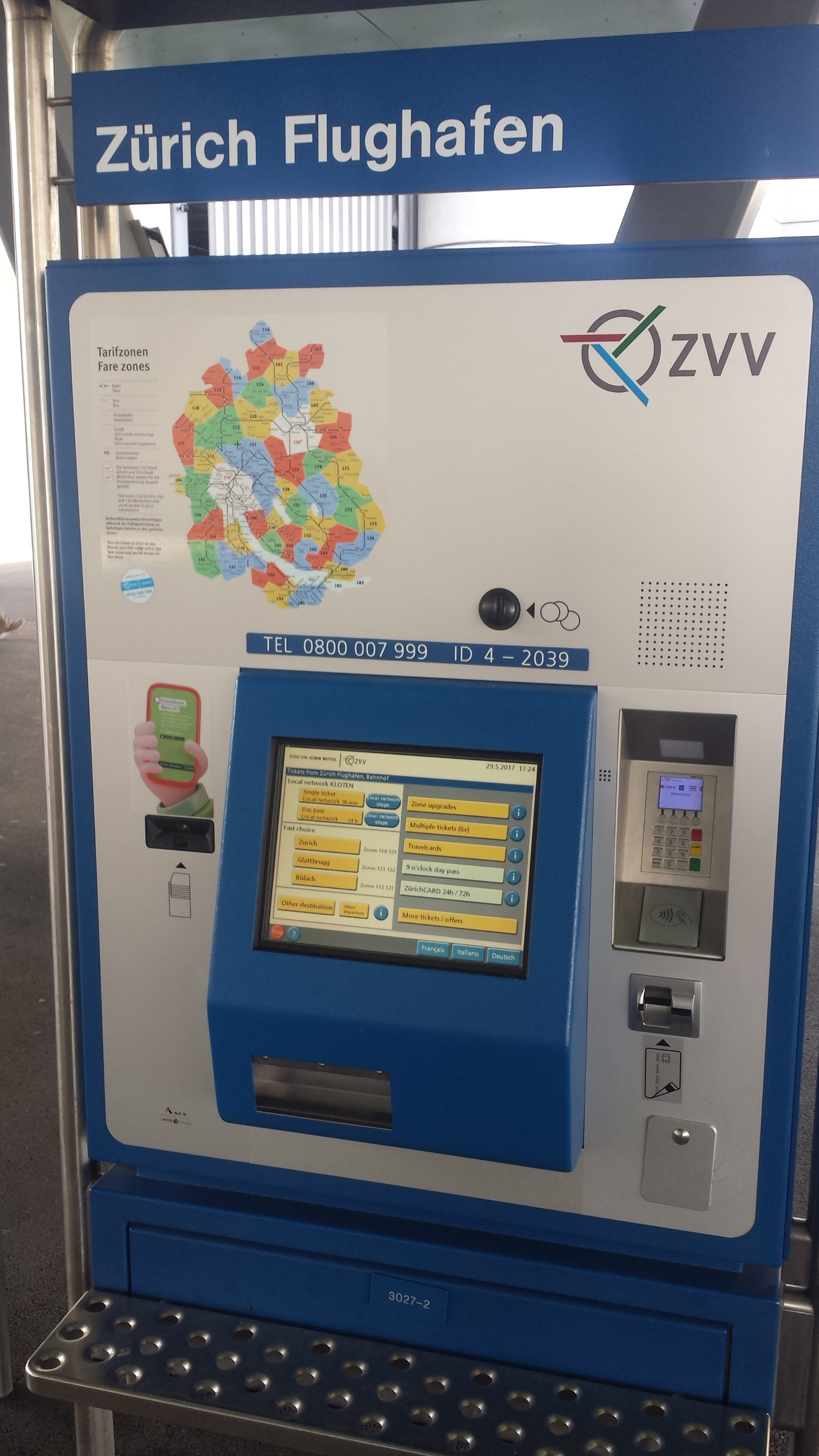
ZVV ticket vending machine, including a zone map

The public transportation network of the Zürcher Verkehrsverbund (ZVV) is divided into 45 fare zones covering Zurich, Switzerland, and nearby regions, mostly in the canton of Zurich. The fare zones (Tarifzonen) are numbered 110 to 184, with zones 180 to 184 designating those outside of the canton of Zurich (Aargau, Schwyz and St. Gallen), while zone 114 includes the southern part of the canton of Schaffhausen and zone 162 part of the canton of Thurgau. The city of Zurich corresponds to fare zone 110. The network covers a major portion of the Zurich metropolitan area.

Trips by tram/light rail, bus, fast and regional trains, such as InterCity (IC), InterRegio (IR), RegioExpress (RE), S-Bahn (S), even international trains (such as EuroCity Zürich HB–Munich), by any operator, are part of the fare network as long as the start and end of the journey both lie within the fare network's boundaries (see integrated ticketing). Passengers can use all modes of public transport within the fare zones covered by their ticket.

The zone system approach has been adopted by many other fare networks in Switzerland, such as libero in the cantons of Bern and Solothurn, and OSTWIND in the cantons of Thurgau, St. Gallen, Glarus, both Appenzells (AI and AR), Schaffhausen, some municipalities in southern Germany, and Liechtenstein.

== Tickets ==
The fares for zones 110 (the City of Zurich) and 120 (the City of Winterthur) are priced double that of the other zones. The six zones bordering central Zurich (111, 121, 140, 150, 154 and 155) are covered by ZVV's Zurich Card, which permits the holder unlimited second-class travel on all forms of public transportation in downtown Zurich for 24 hours or 72 hours. It also allows transfer between Zurich Airport (Zürich Flughafen, zone 121) and downtown Zurich, as well as travel on the Uetliberg railway line (zones 154, 155), the boats of Lake Zurich Navigation Company, the Polybahn, the Funicular Rigiblick (Seilbahn Rigiblick) and the Dolderbahn rack railway.

Passengers purchase a base ticket for particular zones, either one-way (Einzelbillett, valid for a short time) or return (valid for 24 hours). Upgrades and extension tickets are available as supplements, with the price of the ticket being dependent upon the number of zones entered. When combined with a zone upgrade for four zones, a Zurich Card is valid for all zones on the ZVV network. The 9 O'Clock Pass (9-UhrPass), valid Monday to Friday from 9 a.m. (after rush hour) to 5 a.m. the next day, and all day on Saturdays and Sundays, comes with a nearly 50% discount. If a journey covers eight fare zones or more, including a zone upgrade, the ticket holder is entitled to unlimited travel across the entire ZVV network for the ticket's validity period.

Tickets can be purchased through vending machines located at the railway stations, tram stops and most bus stops (otherwise purchased from the bus driver), or online via the websites of ZVV or Swiss Federal Railways.

== Fare zones ==
There are 45 fare zones. The City of Zurich is zone 110. It includes downtown, the main station and urban neighbourhoods. The zones are listed below, sorted by their approximate travel time from zone 110 by S-Bahn or tram.

Core zone:

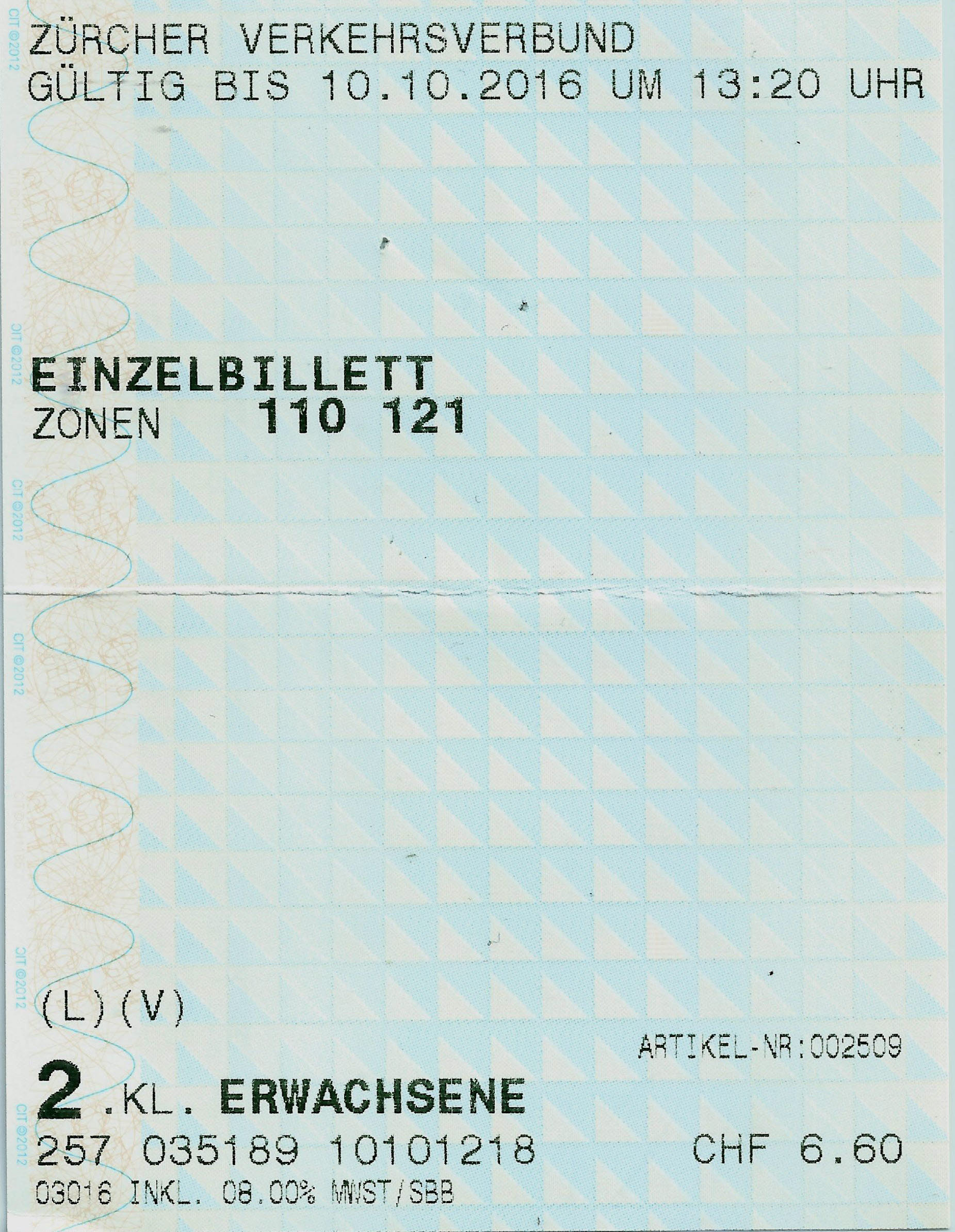
ZVV one-way ticket (Einzelbillett) valid for fare zones 110 and 121

- 110 – City of Zurich

15 to 30 minutes travel:

- 111 – Regensdorf, Buchs and Dällikon
- 117 – Niederweningen, Schöfflisdorf and Otelfingen
- 121 – Zurich Airport, Kloten, Rümlang, Dübendorf and Wallisellen
- 122 – Illnau-Effretikon, Brütten and Lindau
- 130 – Forch, Greifensee, Maur and Volketswil
- 131 – Uster
- 140 – Zollikon, Zumikon, Küsnacht, Erlenbach and Winkel
- 150 – Langnau am Albis, Adliswil (aerial tram to Felsenegg requires the additional zone 155), Thalwil and Oberrieden
- 154 – Urdorf, Birmensdorf, Dietikon and Uitikon
- 155 – Hedingen, Bonstetten and Uetliberg mountain

30 to 40 minutes travel:

- 112 – Bülach, Niederglatt, Niederhasli, Dielsdorf and Steinmaur
- 113 – Hüntwangen, Wil, Eglisau and Glattfelden
- 120 – City of Winterthur, including Wülflingen, Töss and Oberwinterthur
- 123 – Pfungen and Embrach-Rorbas
- 132 – Wetzikon, Gossau and Aathal
- 135 – Fehraltorf and Pfäffikon
- 141 – Herrliberg and Meilen (ferry to Horgen requires the additional zone 151)
- 142 – Uetikon am See and Esslingen
- 151 – Horgen (ferry to Meilen requires the additional zone 141) and Sihlwald
- 152 – Au and Wädenswil
- 156 – Affoltern am Albis, Mettmenstetten and Knonau (also partly included in the Zug Fare Network)
- 184 – Bergdietkon, canton of Aargau

40 to 60+ minutes travel:

- 114 – Rafz and the southern part of the canton of Schaffhausen, also included in the OSTWIND network
- 115 – Marthalen, Benken and Rheinau
- 116 – Laufen-Uhwiesen, Dachsen and Flurlingen, also included in the OSTWIND networks
- 118 – Bachs and Weiach (Kaiserstuhl, canton of Aargau, is on the zone border)
- 124 – Flaach, Volken and Dorf
- 133 – Bubikon, Hombrechtikon and Hinwil
- 134 – Wald, Tann and Ruti
- 143 – Stäfa and Uerikon
- 153 – Richterswil and Samstagern
- 160 – Dinhard, Hettlingen and Thalhem
- 161 – Ossingen and Andelfingen
- 162 – Stammheim and part of the canton of Thurgau
- 163 – Wiesendangen and Rickenbach
- 164 – Elsau and Elgg
- 170 – Kolbrunn, Rikon and Weisslingen
- 171 – Wila and Turbenthal
- 172 – Bauma and Bäretswil
- 173 – Gibswil, Fischenthal and Steg
- 180 – Rapperswil-Jona (located in the canton of St. Gallen but included in both the ZVV and OSTWIND networks) and Hurden
- 181 – Freienbach, Wollerau, Pfäffikon, Ufenau island and Schindellegi, located in the canton of Schwyz but included in the ZVV and partly also in the Tarifverbund Schwyz networks
- 182 – boat landing stages in Altendorf and Lachen, canton of Schwyz
- 183 – boat landing stage in Schmerikon, canton of St. Gallen

=== Corridors ===
For journeys just beyond ZVV's borders, some zones of the neighbouring cantons' fare networks are combined within the extended fare network Z-Pass:

- Aargau: Corridor A-Welle–ZVV
- Schaffhausen/Thurgau/St. Gallen/Glarus: Corridor OSTWIND–ZVV
- Schwyz/Zug: Corridor Schwyz-Zug–ZVV

== See also ==
- List of railway stations in Zurich
- List of Swiss tariff networks
