= Niederweningen railway station =

Railway station in Switzerland

Niederweningen
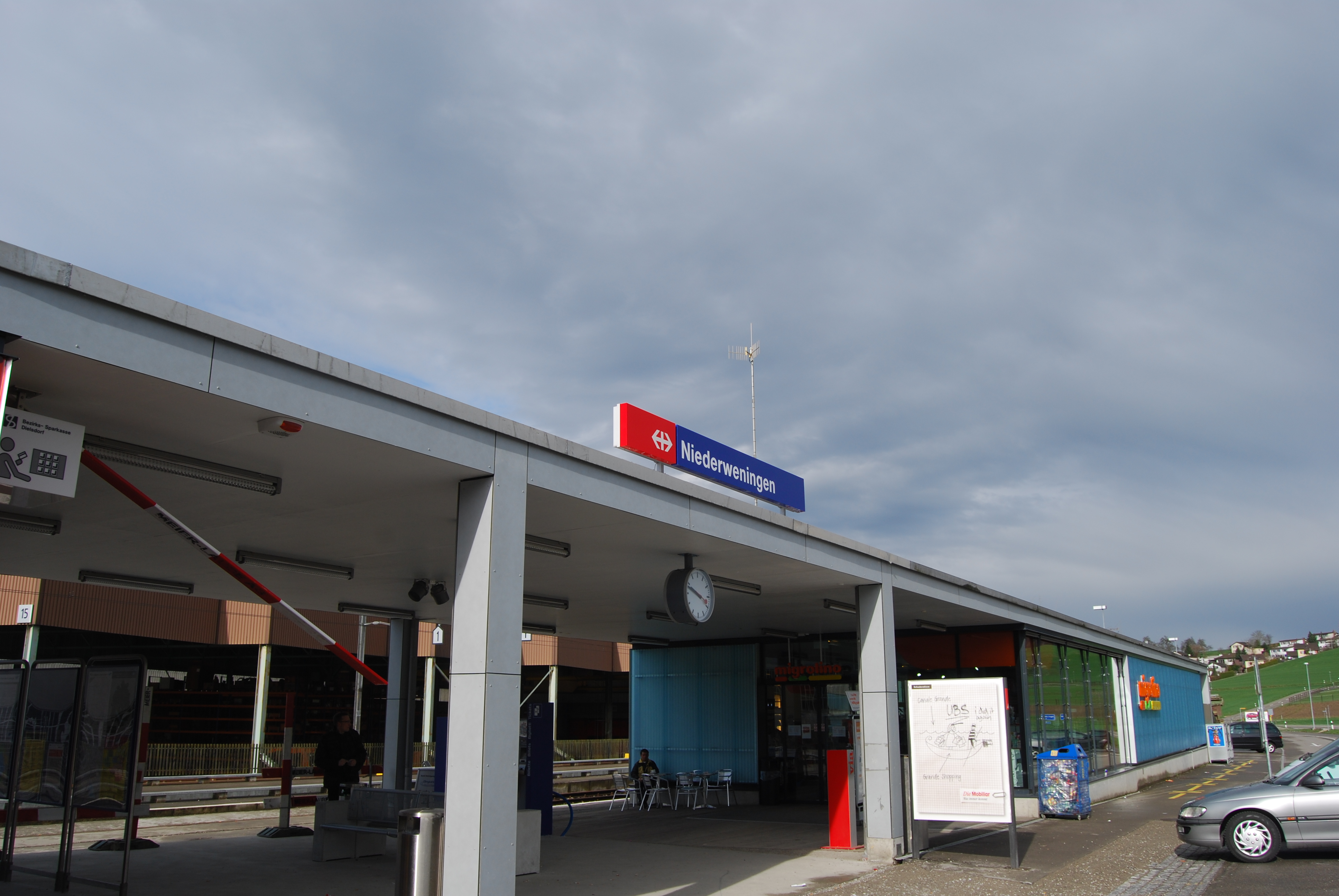
- The station building in 2010

General information
- Location: Wehntalstrasse; Niederweningen; Switzerland
- Coordinates: 47°30′40″N 8°22′11″E
- Elevation: 444 m (1,457 ft)
- Owner: Swiss Federal Railways
- Line: Wehntal line
- Distance: 25.2 km (15.7 mi) from Zürich Hauptbahnhof
- Platforms: 1 side platform
- Tracks: 3
- Train operators: Swiss Federal Railways
- Connections: PostAuto Schweiz buses

Other information
- Fare zone: 117 (ZVV)

Passengers
- 2018: 1,300 per weekday

Services
Preceding station	Zurich S-Bahn	Following station
Terminus	S15	Niederweningen Dorf towards Rapperswil
Location
- Location within Switzerland Location within Canton of Zurich

Niederweningen railway station is a railway station in the municipality of Niederweningen in the Swiss canton of Zurich, located close to the border of both the municipality and the canton. It is the terminal station of the Wehntal railway line, within fare zone 117 of the Zürcher Verkehrsverbund (ZVV).

== History ==
Niederweningen station, and the end of the line, was originally located closer to the centre of Niederweningen, at the location now occupied by Niederweningen Dorf station. In 1938 the line was extended approximately 1 kilometre (0.62 mi) towards the cantonal boundary to serve the company Bucher Industries, and the new terminus retained the name of the previous terminus.

== Facilities ==
The station has a modern station building, which also incorporates a convenience store that is part of the Migrolino chain owned by the Migros company. The Bucher Industries, a manufacturer of agriculture and industrial machinery, is not anymore served by the railway, however some sidings are still visible.

== Services ==
Niederweningen railway station serves as the terminus of Zurich S-Bahn line S15. As of the December 2020 timetable change, the following services stop at the station:

- Zurich S-Bahn S15: half-hourly service to Rapperswil via Zürich HB.

== See also ==
- Rail transport in Switzerland
