= Niederweningen =

- Municipality
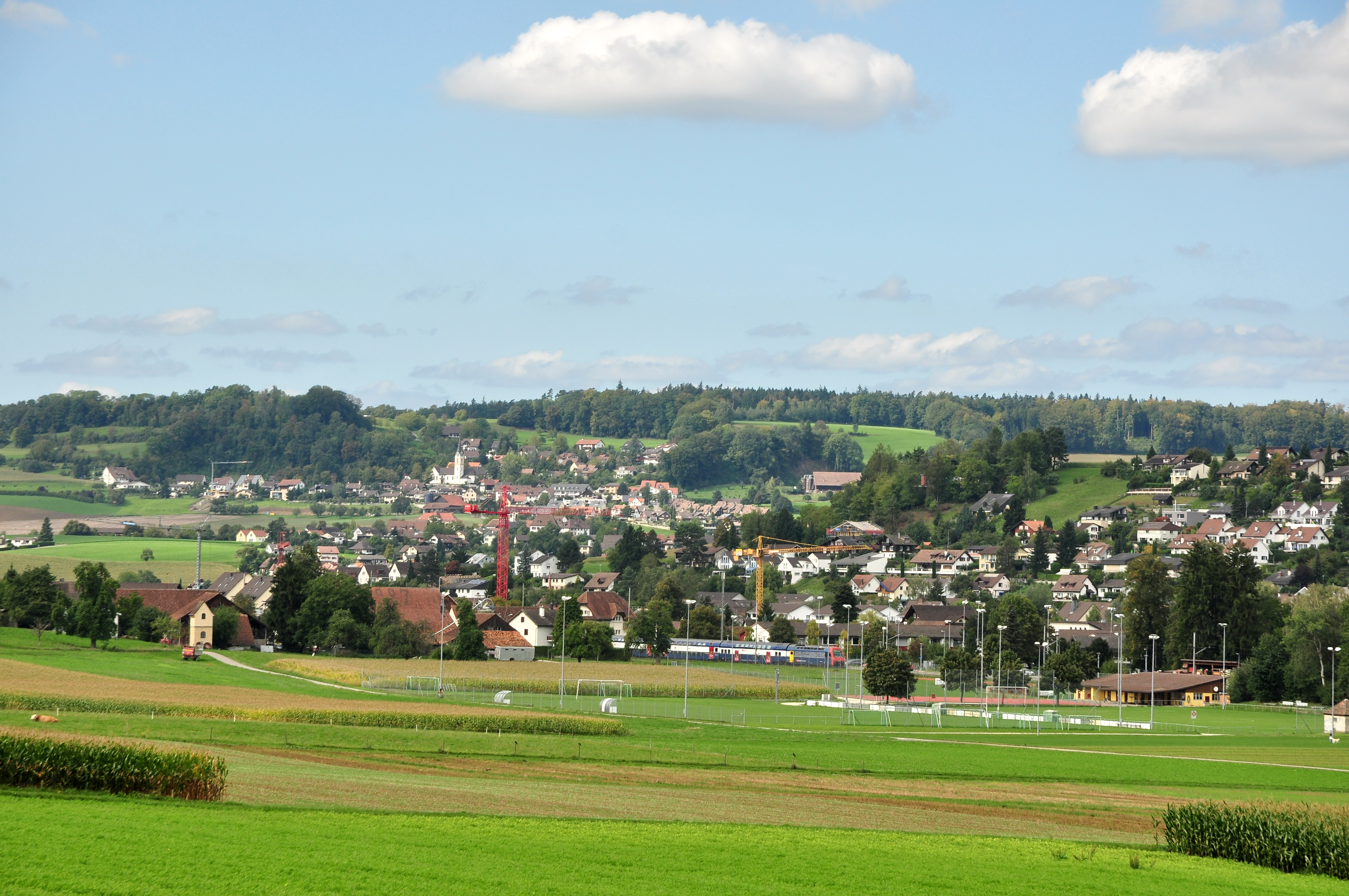

- Flag Coat of arms
- Location of Niederweningen
- Location within Switzerland Location within Canton of Zurich
- Coordinates: 47°30′N 8°23′E
- Country: Switzerland
- Canton: Zurich
- District: Dielsdorf

Area
  - Total: 6.88 km^{2} (2.66 sq mi)
- Elevation: 505 m (1,657 ft)

Population (December 2020)
  - Total: 3,089
  - Density: 449/km^{2} (1,160/sq mi)
- Time zone: UTC+01:00 (CET)
  - Summer (DST): UTC+02:00 (CEST)
- Postal code: 8166
- SFOS number: 91
- ISO 3166 code: CH-ZH
- Surrounded by: Otelfingen, Schleinikon, Schneisingen (AG), Siglistorf (AG), Unterehrendingen (AG), Wettingen (AG)
- Website: www.niederweningen.ch

Niederweningen is a municipality in the district of Dielsdorf in the canton of Zürich in Switzerland.

Niederweningen is particularly known for its mammoth discoveries, which are regarded as the most important Ice Age animal finds in Switzerland.

== Geography ==
Niederweningen lies between the hill ranges of the Egg and the Lägern at the western end of the Wehntal, which is drained by the Surb River. The municipality covers an area of 6.85 km² (2.64 sq mi), of which 45.4% is used for agriculture, 39.0% is forested, 10.8% is settled, 4.2% is occupied by transportation infrastructure and 0.6% consists of water bodies (2018).

Niederweningen borders the municipalities of Siglistorf, Schneisingen, Ehrendingen and Wettingen in the Canton of Aargau, and Schleinikon and Otelfingen in the Canton of Zürich. It is the westernmost municipality in the Canton of Zürich. The highest point is the Burghorn on the Lägern ridge at 859 m (2,818 ft) above sea level.

=== Geology ===
The Wehntal occupies a glacially overdeepened basin in the northern Alpine foreland. Niederweningen is situated at the western end of this basin, which was not completely covered by ice during the last advance of the Rhine Glacier around 24,000 years ago. As a result, older sediment deposits were preserved beneath the valley floor.

A groundwater drilling project near Oberweningen in 1994 demonstrated that the original valley floor extended at least 130 m (430 ft) below the present-day valley floor. Since 2007, interdisciplinary research projects have investigated the morphology and sedimentary fill of this buried glacial basin. These exceptionally well-preserved deposits have contributed to Niederweningen becoming one of Switzerland's most important sites for Ice Age palaeontology.

== History ==
The Wehntal was already inhabited during the Roman period. Two Roman villae rusticae have been identified in nearby Oberweningen and Schleinikon-Dachsleren. The region came under the rule of the Burgundian king Gundobad in AD 507. Around 700, Alemannic settlers established themselves in the valley, including the clan of Wano, from whom the place name is derived. Niederweningen is attested between 1096 and 1111 as Waningen. In 1269 it was documented as Nidirunweningin.

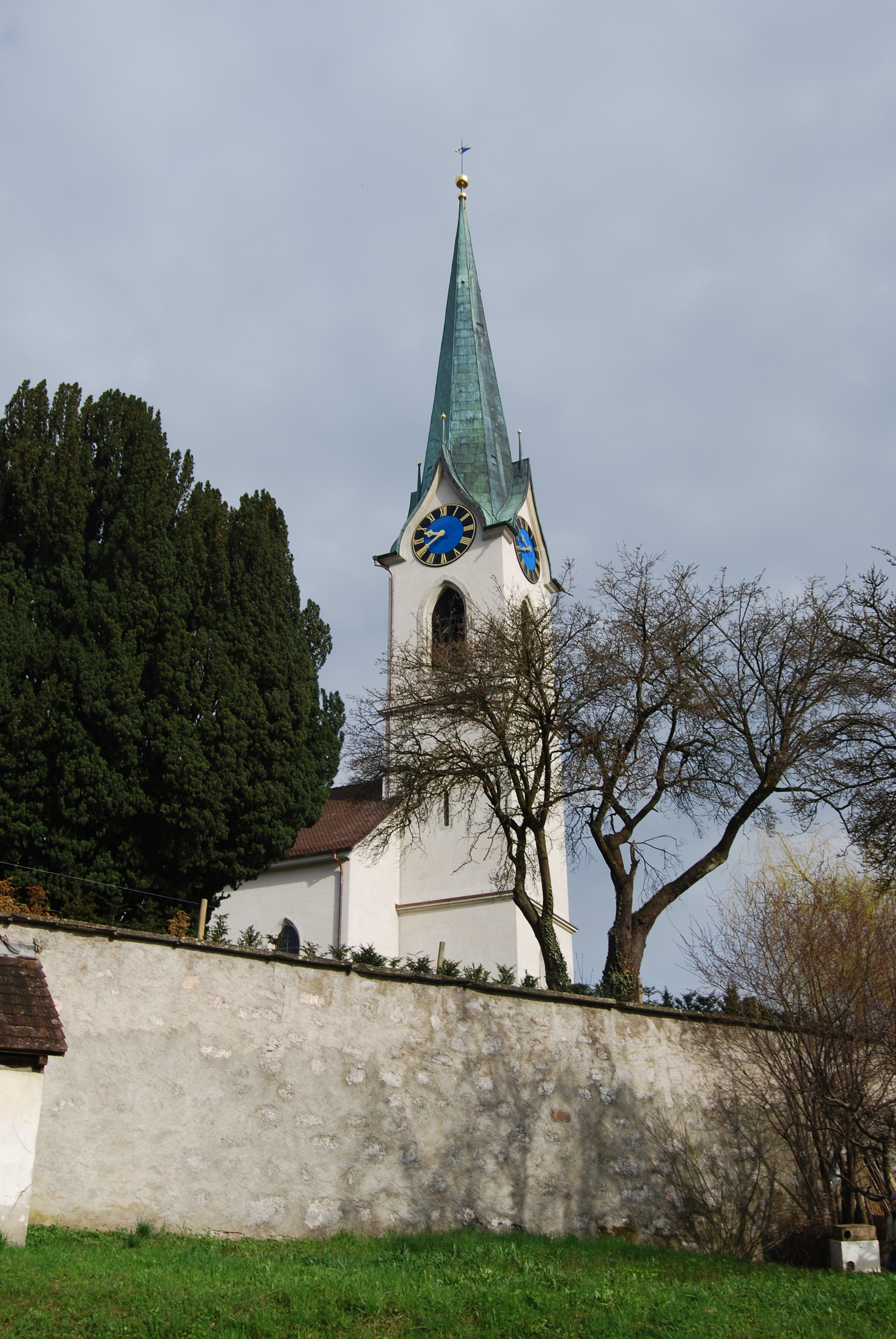
Reformed Church of Niederweningen

During the High Middle Ages the Wehntal formed part of the Duchy of Swabia within the Holy Roman Empire. The region was ruled by the House of Zähringen from 1127 to 1218 and subsequently by the Barons of Regensberg. On 17 March 1409, Niederweningen came under the authority of the city-state of Zürich. Agriculture dominated the local economy throughout the Middle Ages, with rents commonly paid in grain, poultry and livestock. Beekeeping is also documented during this period. Following poor harvests in the 16th and 17th centuries, agriculture underwent significant changes. During the Reformation, pilgrimages were prohibited in the Canton of Zürich and Protestant practices were introduced in the parish of Niederweningen. Between 1608 and 1668, large areas of woodland were cleared to create additional farmland and vineyards. In 1671, the present Reformed church was built on the foundations of an earlier Romanesque church.

The Act of Mediation of 1803 established Niederweningen as a modern political municipality with an elected municipal council and mayor. Until the nineteenth century, the local economy remained strongly dependent on agriculture and water-powered industries. Mills along the Surb River and the processing of gypsum played an important role in the village's economic development.

During construction of the Wehntal railway in 1890, numerous mammoth bones, teeth and tusks were discovered in a gravel pit belonging to the Swiss Northeastern Railway. The palaeontologist Arnold Lang began systematic excavations the same year and published a detailed scientific report in 1892. He described the site as the most important mammoth discovery then known in Switzerland. The remains were found within an ancient peat bog and included bones from several adult animals as well as those of a mammoth foetus or newborn calf. Additional discoveries were made in 1987, 2003 and 2004. Since 2005, some of the finds and related research have been presented at the Mammutmuseum Niederweningen. Others, including the skeleton of a large mammoth bull, are displayed at the Natural History Museum of the University of Zurich.

The railway reached Niederweningen in 1891 with the opening of the Swiss Northeastern Railway's Wehntal line. Improved transport links supported the village's industrial development. Particular importance was attained by Bucher-Guyer, from which the modern engineering group Bucher Industries emerged.

During the Second World War, an internment camp for Polish soldiers operated in the Hasel area between 1942 and 1946. The internees were employed in drainage and land-improvement projects, forestry work, agriculture and later in the workshops of Bucher-Guyer.

On 7 December 1944, Niederweningen was the target of an accidental Allied air attack. A fighter-bomber strafed the Bucher-Guyer factory and nearby residential buildings in Niederweningen and neighbouring Schneisingen. No casualties occurred and damage was estimated at approximately 5,000 Swiss francs. Later research attributed the attack with high probability to an American night fighter that had missed its intended target in southern Germany.

The psychiatrist Adolf Meyer was born in Niederweningen in 1866.

Aerial view (1967)

== Demographics ==
As of 31 December 2025, Niederweningen had a population of 3,273, of whom 587 (17.9%) were foreign nationals. The population has grown steadily since 2000, when the municipality had 2,240 inhabitants.

In 2025, 29.4% of the population belonged to the Swiss Reformed Church and 19.0% were Roman Catholic. A majority of residents (51.5%) belonged to another religion or had no religious affiliation.

The age distribution in 2025 was 22.1% under the age of 20, 61.0% between 20 and 64, and 17.0% aged 65 or older.

In the 2023 Swiss federal election, the Swiss People's Party (SVP) was the largest party with 33.9% of the vote, followed by the Green Liberal Party (GLP) with 13.8%, the Social Democratic Party (SP) with 12.9%, the Free Democratic Party (FDP) with 11.2%, the Green Party with 10.7% and The Centre with 9.2%.

The unemployment rate was 1.3% in June 2025.

The historical population is given in the following table:

| year | population |
|---|---|
| 1634 | 309 |
| 1850 | 806 |
| 1900 | 551 |
| 1950 | 841 |
| 2000 | 2220 |
| 2025 | 3273 |

== Economy ==
Niederweningen is home to the headquarters of Bucher Industries, an internationally active Swiss engineering group whose origins lie in a blacksmith's workshop established in the village in 1807.

In 2023, 877 people were employed within the municipality. Of these, 52 worked in the primary sector (agriculture and forestry), 361 in the secondary sector (manufacturing and construction), and 464 in the tertiary sector (services). The municipality contained 20 businesses in the primary sector, 17 in the secondary sector and 126 in the tertiary sector.

Historically, the local economy was dominated by agriculture and water-powered industries. Mills along the Surb River and the processing of gypsum played an important role in the economic development of the village until the nineteenth century.

== Heritage and culture ==
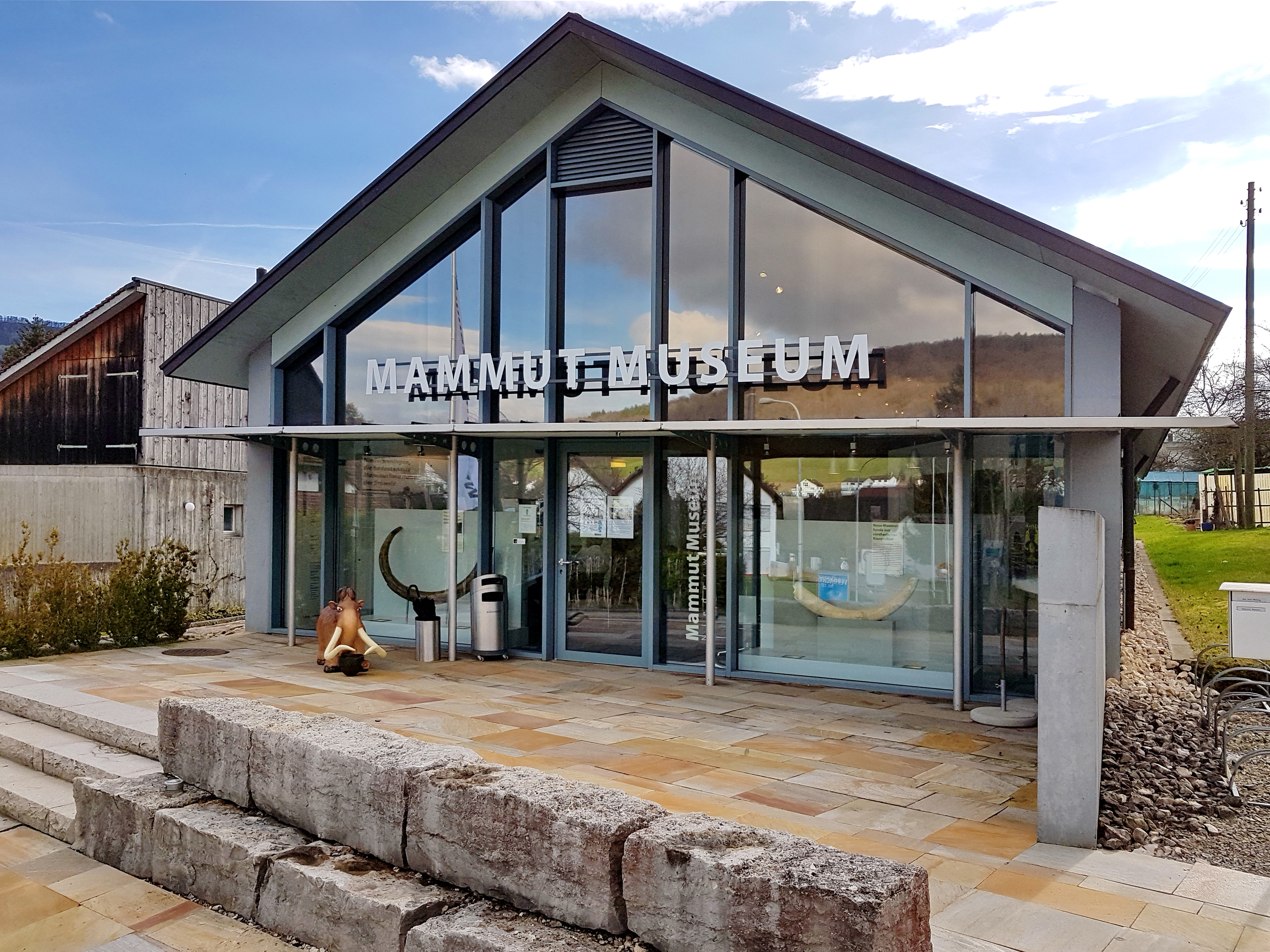
Mammutmuseum Niederweningen

=== Architectural heritage ===
The most notable historic building in Niederweningen is Villa Bucher-Guyer. In addition, the municipal inventory of protected buildings records numerous historic farmhouses, mills and commercial buildings that document the architectural development of the municipality from the early modern period onwards.

=== Mammoth discoveries ===
Niederweningen is regarded as the most important Ice Age animal site in Switzerland. The first major discoveries were made during construction of the Wehntal railway in 1890, and later excavations uncovered remains of at least seven mammoths as well as other Pleistocene fauna. Since 2005, the Mammutmuseum Niederweningen has presented the finds and the environmental history of the Wehntal during the Ice Age.

== Transport ==
Niederweningen is the western terminus of the Wehntal railway line and is served by Zürich S-Bahn line S15, which provides half-hourly services via Oberglatt to Zürich Hauptbahnhof and Rapperswil.

The municipality is served by two railway stations, Niederweningen and Niederweningen Dorf, the former situated close to the border with the neighbouring canton of Aargau. Several PostAuto bus routes connect Niederweningen with Döttingen, Kaiserstuhl, Baden, Siglistorf and surrounding communities.

The Hauptstrasse 17, which links Zürich with the lower Aare valley, passes through the municipality.
