= S15 (ZVV) =

Railway service in Switzerland

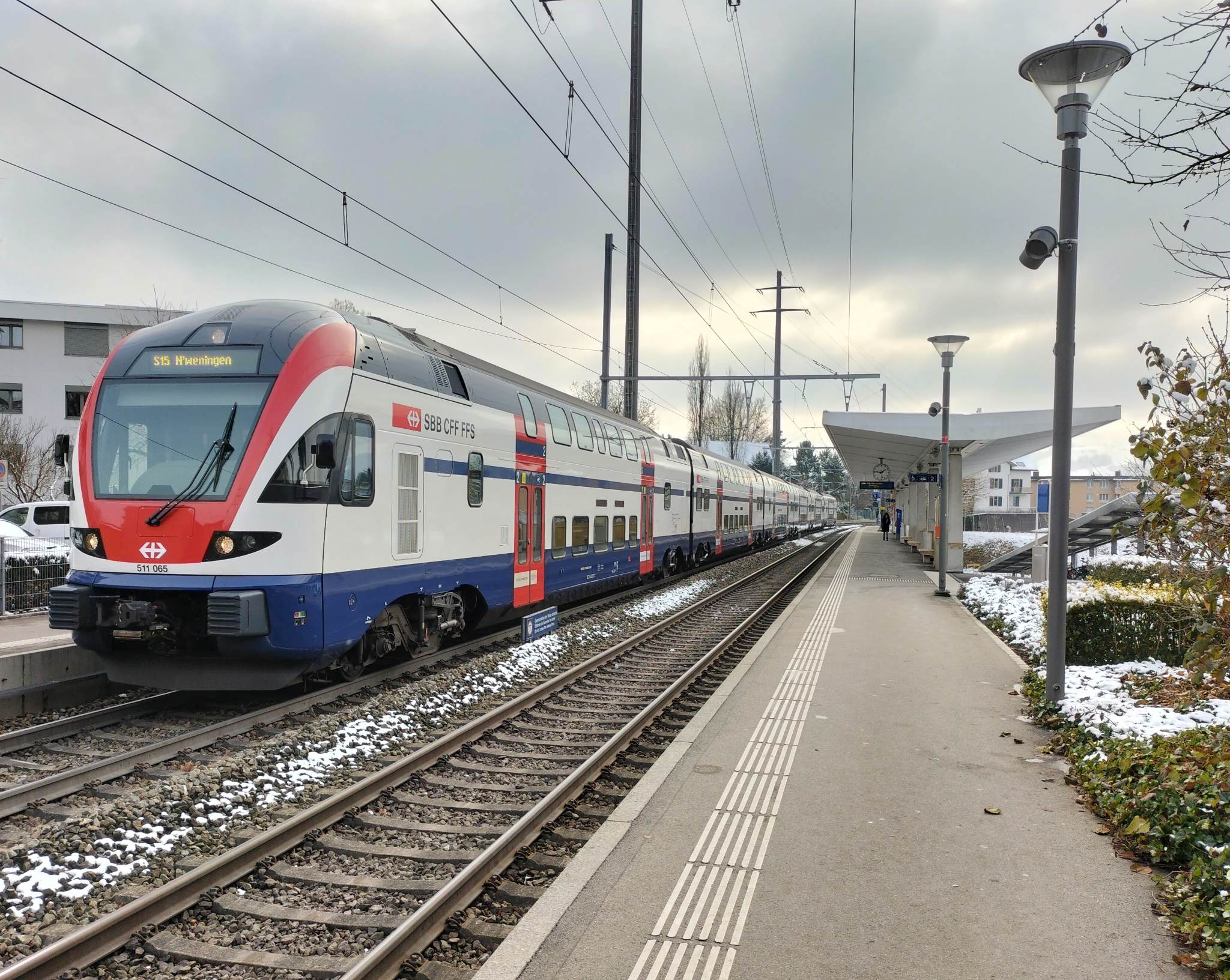
- S15 at Jona railway station.

Overview
- Status: Operational
- Locale: Zürich, Switzerland
- Termini: Niederweningen; Rapperswil
- Stations: 19
- Website: ZVV (in English)

Service
- Type: S-Bahn
- System: Zürich S-Bahn
- Operator(s): Zürcher Verkehrsverbund (ZVV)
- Rolling stock: RABe 511 class; Re 450 class + double-deck coaches

Technical
- Track gauge: 1,435 mm (4 ft 8 1/2 in)

The S15 is a regional railway line of the Zürich S-Bahn on the Zürcher Verkehrsverbund (ZVV), Zürich transportation network, and is one of the network's lines connecting the cantons of Zürich and St. Gallen.

Zürich S-Bahn network as of December 2018

At Zürich HB, trains of the S15 service usually depart from underground tracks (Gleis) 41–44 (Museumstrasse station).

== Route ==
- S15 Niederweningen–Hardbrücke–Zürich HB–Uster–Wetzikon–Rapperswil
  Stops between Stadelhofen and Wetzikon only in Uster.

The line runs from Niederweningen (abbreviated as "N'weningen" on the destination sign), in the north-west of the canton of Zürich, to Zurich Oerlikon and Zurich Hauptbahnhof before continuing via Zürich Stadelhofen and Uster to Rapperswil-Jona (Canton of St. Gallen). It serves the following stations:

- Niederweningen
- Niederweningen Dorf
- Schöfflisdorf-Oberweningen
- Steinmaur
- Dielsdorf
- Niederhasli
- Oberglatt
- Rümlang
- Glattbrugg
- Zürich Oerlikon
- Zürich Hardbrücke
- Zürich Hauptbahnhof
- Zürich Stadelhofen
- Uster
- Wetzikon
- Bubikon
- Rüti ZH
- Jona
- Rapperswil

== Rolling stock ==
Most services were operated once with RABe 514 class (weekdays) and RABe 511 (weekends) trains, before the timetable change in late 2015. Some services are run by Re 450 class locomotives pushing or pulling double-deck passenger carriages. As of the December 2022 timetable change, services are operated with RABe 511 class multiple units or Re 450 class locomotives with double-deck coaches.

== Scheduling ==
The train frequency on the line is usually 30 minutes and the trip takes 72 minutes. Combined with the S5, the S15 provides quarter-hourly services at stations between Hardbrücke and Rapperswil.

== History ==
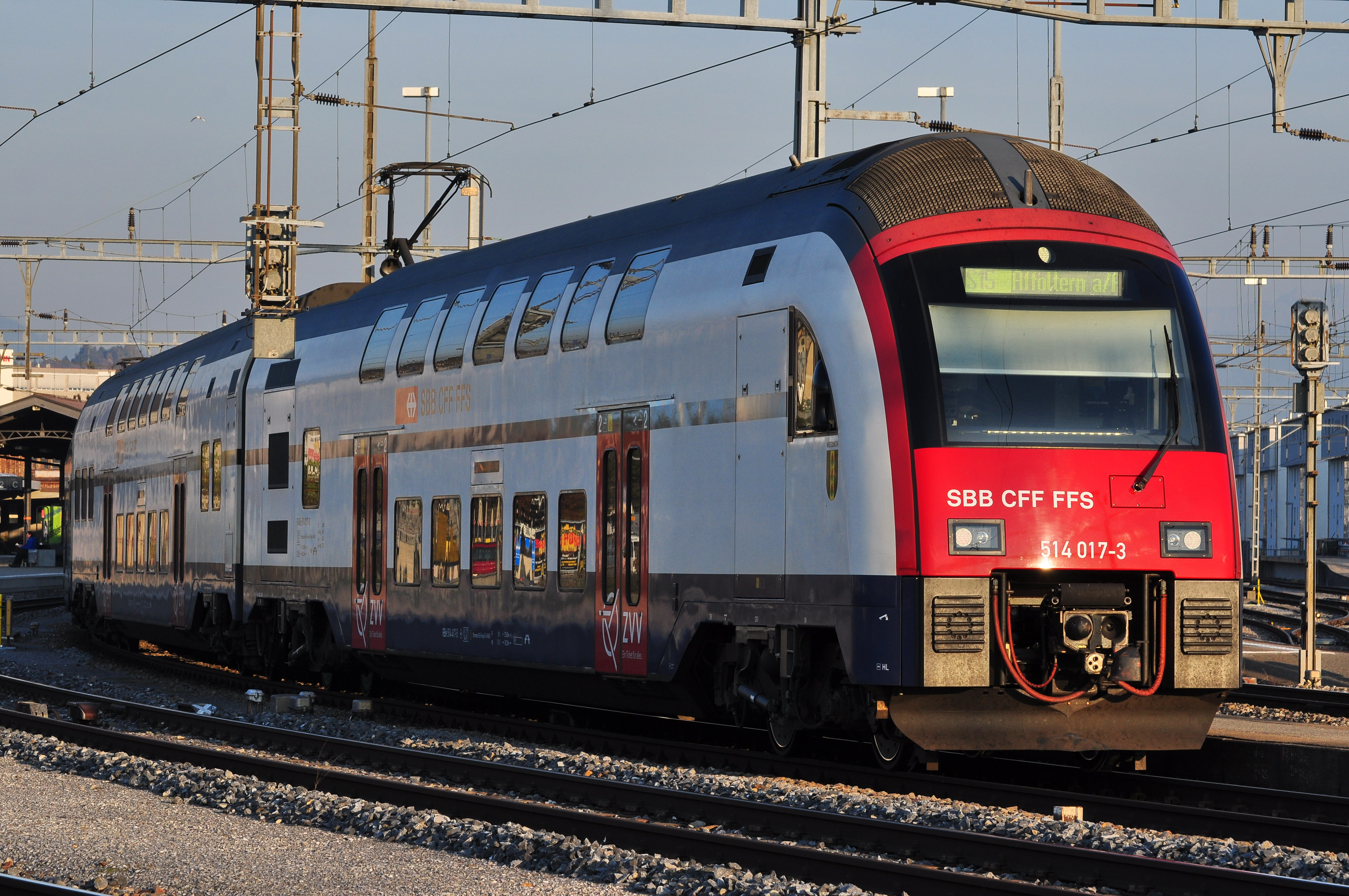
Former S15, headed for Affoltern a.A., in Rapperswil

The service was started between Rapperswil and Birmensdorf on 10 December 2006, following line improvements. On 9 December 2007, the line was extended from Birmensdorf to Affoltern am Albis. RABe 514 ("DTZ") EMUs were mostly used.

With the introduction of the new timetable in late 2015, the western terminus of the service was switched from Affoltern am Albis to Niederweningen. The stations between Zürich Altstetten and Affoltern am Albis that are no longer served by the S15 are now served by the S14. The S55 between Oberglatt and Niederwenigen was subsumed into the S15.

== See also ==
- Rail transport in Switzerland
- List of railway stations in Zurich
- Public transport in Zurich
- ZVV fare zones
