= Alitalia Flight 404 =

1990 aviation accident in Switzerland

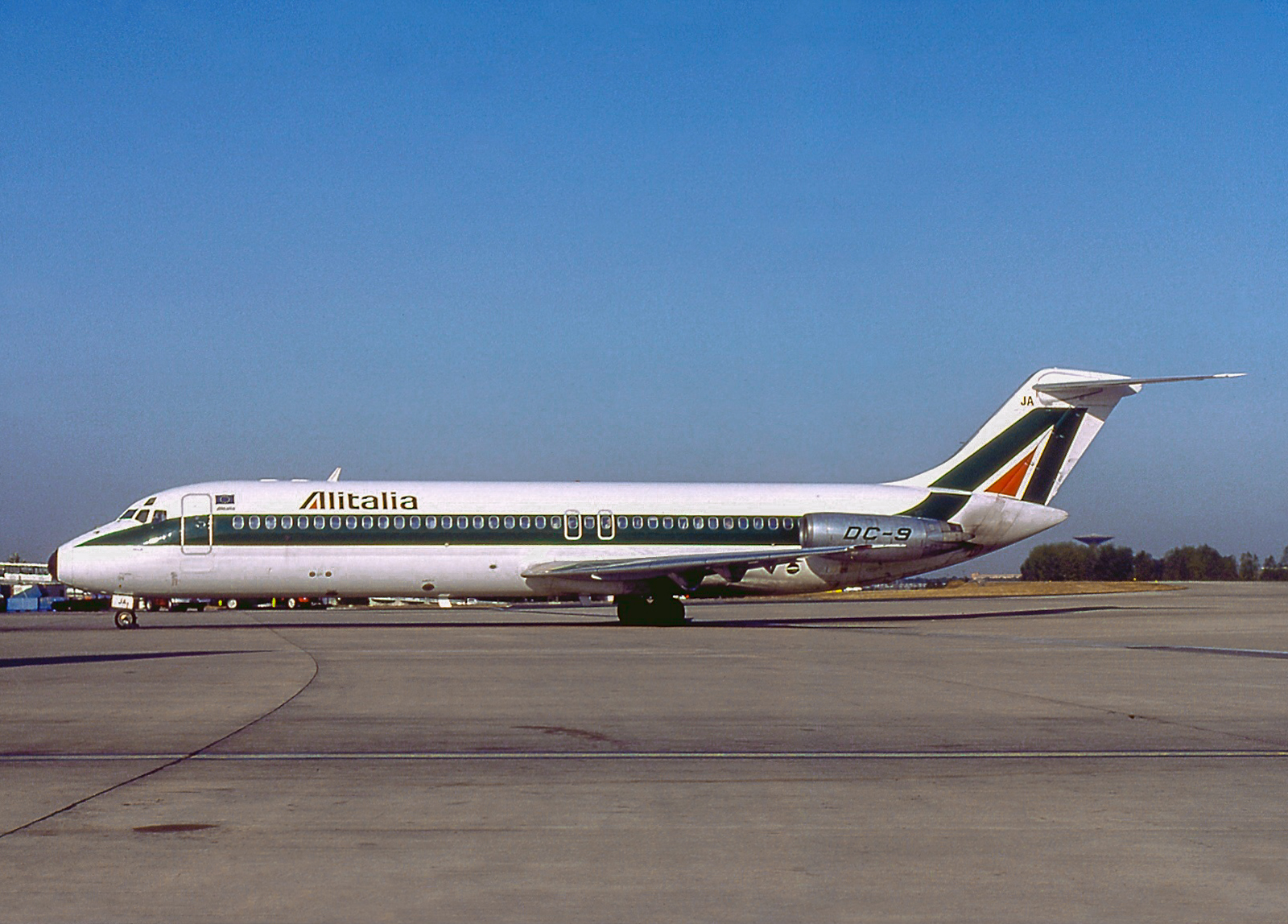
- I-ATJA, the aircraft involved in the accident, seen in August 1990

Accident
- Date: 14 November 1990
- Summary: Controlled flight into terrain due to NAV receiver failure and pilot error
- Site: Stadlerberg Mountain, Weiach, Switzerland; 47°32′50″N 8°26′51″E

Aircraft
- Aircraft type: McDonnell Douglas DC-9-32
- Aircraft name: Sicilia
- Operator: Alitalia
- IATA flight No.: AZ404
- ICAO flight No.: AZA404
- Call sign: ALITALIA 404
- Registration: I-ATJA
- Flight origin: Linate Airport, Milan, Italy
- Destination: Zurich Airport, Zurich, Switzerland
- Occupants: 46
- Passengers: 40
- Crew: 6
- Fatalities: 46
- Survivors: 0

Alitalia Flight 404 (AZ404/AZA404) was an international passenger flight scheduled to fly from Linate Airport in Milan, Italy, to Zurich Airport in Zurich, Switzerland, which crashed on 14 November 1990. The McDonnell Douglas DC-9-32, operated by Alitalia, crashed into the woodlands of Weiach as it approached Zurich Airport, killing all 46 occupants on board.

A Swiss investigation concluded that the accident was caused by a short circuit, which led to the failure of the aircraft's NAV receiver. The malfunction went unnoticed by the crew, who likely believed they were on the correct flight path until the crash. Swiss authorities also blamed inadequate crew resource management, exemplified when the captain vetoed the first officer's attempted go-around, along with the absence of lighting on Stadlerberg Mountain and a known problem with errors in reading the drum pointer altimeter of the aircraft.

The final report by the Federal Aircraft Accidents Inquiry Board requested several major changes and made further recommendations.

== Accident ==
During the approach to runway 14 of Zurich Airport, the captain's instrument landing system (ILS) display gave incorrect values due to a faulty receiver. It falsely indicated that the aircraft was about 1,000 feet higher than it actually was, which also prevented the Ground proximity warning system (GPWS) from reading the situation and sounding a warning. The ILS receiver of the first officer was working correctly and displayed the dangerously low approach. Without thoroughly examining which value was correct, the captain decided to ignore the second device, aborting a go-around maneuver initiated by the first officer. Shortly afterward, at 20:11 CET, the plane struck Stadlerberg Mountain at 1,660 feet (510 m), killing all 40 passengers and six crew.

The aircraft's first impact was with trees on the right side of the aircraft, causing several essential parts on the right side of the aircraft, such as the right-wing flaps and the outer right wing, to detach. As a result, the aircraft produced an asymmetric lift force and began to roll to the right, finally slamming into the mountain in a nearly inverted position.

Firefighters and police were immediately dispatched to the accident site but the fire was so intense that it took an entire day to put out. Eyewitnesses stated that "the plane was burning like a volcano." Linate Airport immediately set up a crisis center to handle the relatives of the victims aboard the flight.

== Aircraft ==
The aircraft involved was a McDonnell Douglas DC-9-32, built-in 1974 with serial number 47641 and the registered number I-ATJA. The aircraft, originally delivered to Aero Trasporti Italiani, a subsidiary of Alitalia, was soon transferred to Alitalia. According to investigators, the aircraft had accumulated more than 43,894 cycles and also stated that the aircraft had been inspected 10 days prior to the accident.

== Passengers and crew ==
Nation	Pax	Crew	Total
Switzerland	26	0	26
Italy	6	6	12
United States	6	0	6
Japan	2	0	2
Total	40	6	46

The aircraft was carrying 40 passengers and 6 crew members. The crew members consisted of two pilots and four flight attendants, all of whom were Italian citizens. Two Japanese officials from the Oki Electric Industry were also on board and many other passengers were laborers heading home after working in Milan's industrial area. Among the passengers on board was Italian actor Roberto Mariano.

The captain was Raffaele Liberti, aged 47, a 20-year veteran of Alitalia with a total flying time of more than 10,000 hours. The first officer (the pilot flying) was Massimo De Fraia, aged 28, who had joined Alitalia in 1989 and with 831 hours was much less experienced than captain Liberti.

== Investigation ==
Swiss officials were informed of the accident approximately one hour after it occurred, and at least 80 Swiss investigators were involved in the inquiry. Additionally, Italian Interior Minister Vincenzo Scotti sent a team of investigators to the accident site along with the United States' NTSB and FAA. Both the Flight Data Recorder and the Cockpit Voice Recorder were recovered from the accident site.

In the initial hours after the accident, several witnesses claimed that the aircraft was on fire before it hit Stadlerberg while others claimed that the aircraft had exploded before it impacted terrain. Josef Meier, a spokesman for Swiss air traffic control authorities stated in a news conference that all possible causes, including terrorism, were being evaluated by the investigators.

Italian news media reported that the mountain was covered with cloud and that there was heavy rain in the area, while Swiss investigators claimed that visibility was good during the accident with light showers occurring at the airport.

On 16 November, an official from the Swiss investigation team stated that the aircraft was flying at a lower altitude than it should have been: "The plane was 300 metres (980 ft) too low on its approach, and was slightly off course. [The captain] was not following the radio beacon signals." The statement did not say why the plane was too low.

=== Pilot error ===
The first officer had initiated a go-around but the captain aborted it. He said, "Hold the glide slope, can you hold it?". The first officer replied, "Yes, sir". Investigators working with McDonnell Douglas concluded that, if the captain had not interrupted the go-around and had a situational awareness as the first officer had, the disaster would have been completely averted. Investigators believe that the reason for the bad call was that the captain had no situational awareness at all and was completely dissatisfied with the first officer's performance during the flight. As a result, the captain showed a lack of trust in his first officer.

=== Stadlerberg Mountain ===
As Stadlerberg Mountain is relatively far from the runway, per International Civil Aviation Organization (ICAO) standards, obstruction lighting was not required. The 2,090-foot (640 m) mountain could not be seen during the night, and thus could endanger flights. This problem had been discussed between Swissair, Swiss airport authorities, and the Swiss Federal Office of Civil Aviation (FOCA) since 1976. Analysis of the cockpit voice recorder did not give any indications that the crew was looking for the cloud-capped mountain during the approach.

=== NAV Receiver failure ===
Recordings from the black boxes showed that the navigation instrument, the ADI/HSI, had apparently captured the glideslope. At the time when the glide slope was captured, the aircraft was flying about 1,300 feet below the glide path. Examining the receiver with a microscope, the investigation revealed that during the impact, the glide path indicator had been positioned just above the center "on glide" position, which means that the glide path had been captured. Investigators also revealed that all NAV instruments were following the glide path, although the aircraft was flying below the nominal glide path. At the time, investigators didn't find any defects on the instrument.

Detailed examination of the NAV showed that the NAV mode, during its operation in-flight, can lead to a completely false LOC (horizontal alignment) or GS (vertical alignment) indication ("ON" indication). A small red flag should have appeared on the indicator when the error occurred, but it did not. McDonnell Douglas provided the investigators a letter, which it had sent six years earlier (24 August 1984) to every operator of DC-8, DC-9, C-9, and MD-80 aircraft equipped with the faulty NAV receiver, which related to the NAV switching failure mode. McDonnell Douglas had held a seminar about the faulty NAV in 1985 in Long Beach, California, and Alitalia had sent three pilots there. However, the message from both the letter and the seminar was not transmitted to Alitalia operating crews. They, including the crew of Flight 404, were unaware of the possible false indication.

==== Cause of NAV Receiver failure ====
According to McDonnell Douglas, a short circuit or an open circuit in certain models of radio navigation (VOR/ILS) receivers could cause navigation instruments to indicate "zero deviation". Thus, raw data deviation information on the attitude direction indicator, displayed by the flight director bars, and the horizontal situation indicator could center and remain centered with no failure or warning flag in view.

Not only did it fail to warn the pilots about the problem, but this open circuit also prevented the autopilot and the Ground proximity warning system (GPWS) from receiving the proper course and glide path deviation signals, resulting in neither instrument warning about the imminent danger. The autopilot continued to guide the aircraft according to the previously established crew inputs and the GPWS did not sound an alarm since the crew believed that they were on the correct glide path, while in reality, they were not.

As a crosscheck of the system, the captain and the first officer would normally use two separate VOR/LOC receivers for navigation information. However, due to the absence of a warning flag, the captain and the first officer believed that they were on the right track, and later used the NAV switching function to select the malfunctioning VOR/LOC receiver on both panels.

=== Altimeter misreading ===
Examples of altitude displays prone to misreading. Though all indicates an altitude of 12,950 ft, but a) the three-pointer altimeter and b) the drum-pointer altimeter are easily misread as 13,950 ft.

The aircraft was equipped with an older "drum pointer" altimeter. This type of altimeter has several disadvantages; for instance, in certain pointer positions, the needles partially obscure the readout resulting in the inability to accurately determine altitude.

The United States Air Force had noted this altimeter design as problematic in several training and safety reports.

In the previous year, there were several accidents that were caused due to altimeter misreading. NASA research showed that, from a survey of 169 US pilots, 137 pilots said that they had already misread an altimeter at least once, 134 pilots had observed another pilot misreading an altimeter, 85% of the pilots explained that they had noticed that misreading has occurred more than once in the cockpit during their work, and most of the misreading occurred during the approach phase.

The survey then concluded several things, based on the comments from the pilots:

- "This altimeter takes more concentration than should be necessary to read accurately."
- "The small drum window is a complication in the instrument and [is] quite small, often requiring a 'double look' and diverting attention from the needle."
- "Misreads always occur at a lower altitude when pilots split attention between more activities."
- "The most stressful situations produced more misreads."
- "A quick look after [being distracted] can induce a reading of 1,000 feet off if the barrel drum is halfway between thousands."

Investigators stated that the crew of Flight 404 might have misread the altimeter. It is plausible that the captain had misread the altimeter, believing that the outer marker height of 2,650 feet had only been undershot by a small amount. He then countermanded the co-pilot's order for a go-around, as he thought that he could attain the correct glide path within a short time with a reduced rate of descent.

== Aftermath ==
The memorial for the victims at the crash site.
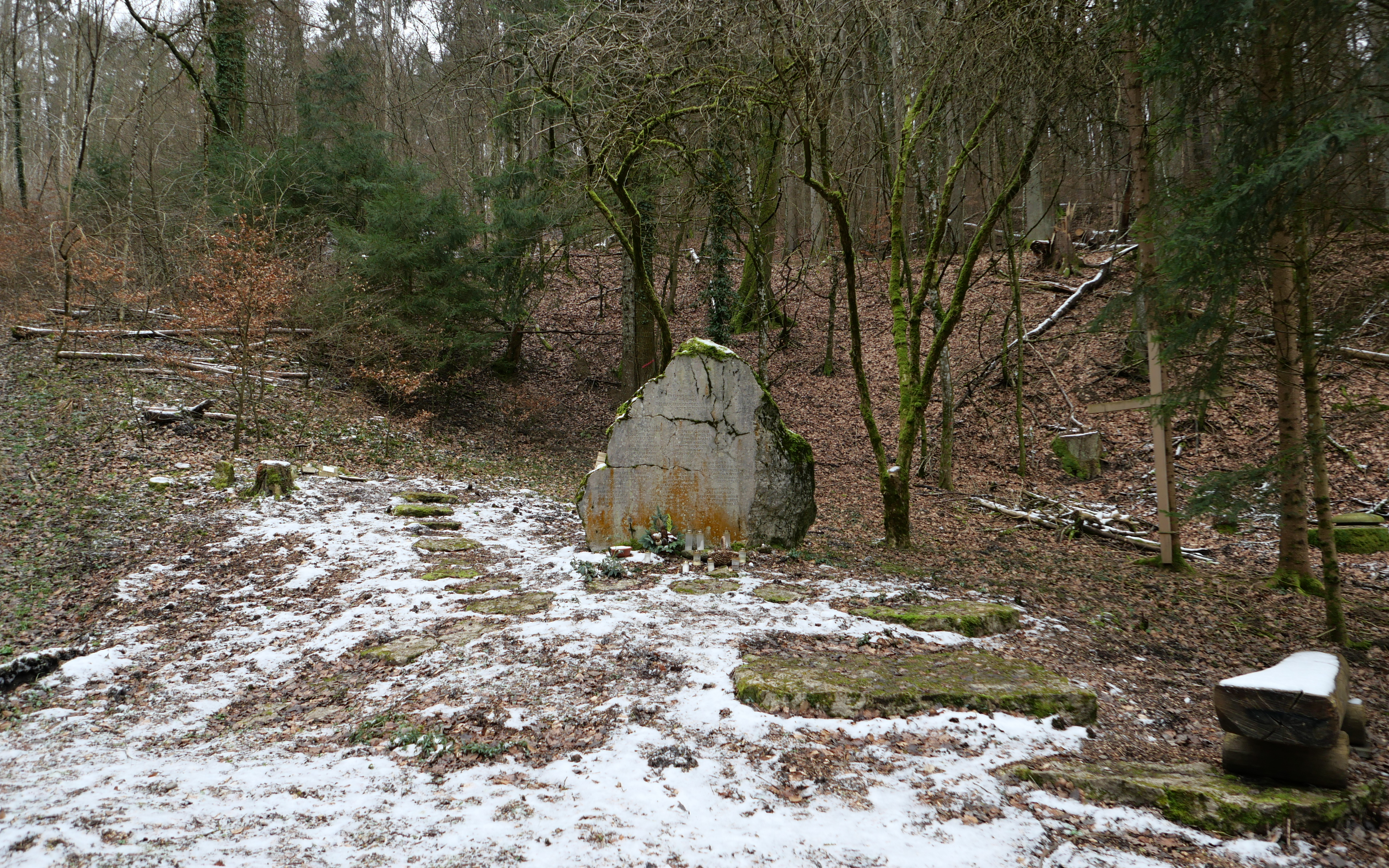
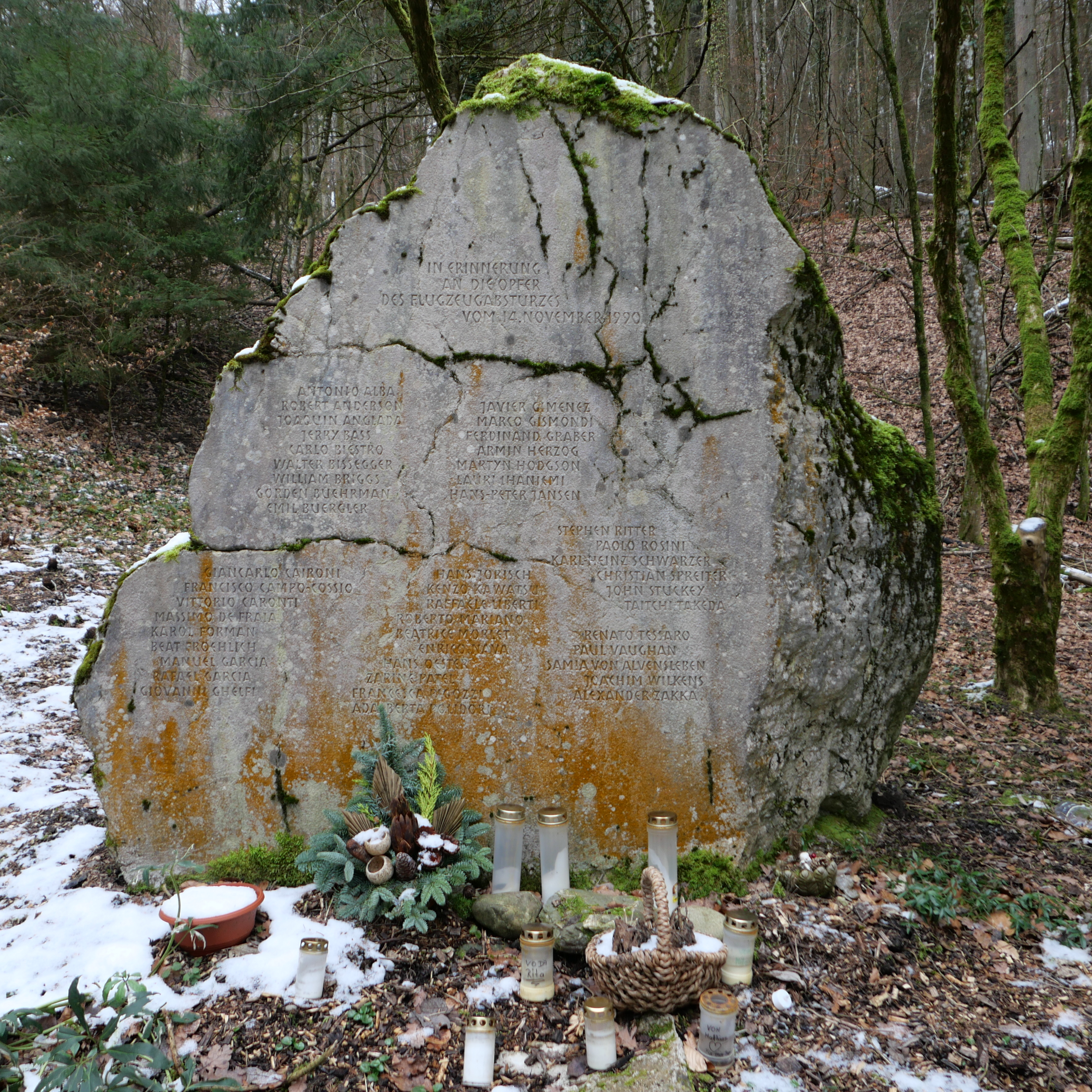

Reviewing the chain of events, the investigation board made several recommendations in order to avoid similar scenarios. Improved rules for communication among pilot and co-pilot during landing have been implemented, and the possibilities of misreading flight altimeters have been pointed out to pilots. Most importantly, new rules prohibit the aborting of a go-around once initiated, regardless of the rank and function of the crew member initiating the go-around. Proper review of decisions and clear communications are part of crew resource management.

Several major changes were made after the accident:

- Alitalia added the NAV receiver failure problem to their training and also added the actions that the crew should take in case it happens.
- Alitalia and all other airlines issued an order that forbade interrupting a go-around. Once called, the go-around procedure has to be done. This rule is now general in almost all airlines.
- Swiss aviation authorities added lights to Stadlerberg Mountain.
- McDonnell Douglas revised their training manual to add information about the possibility of NAV failure.

Additionally, several recommendations were made:

- NAV equipment without monitoring of the output signal should no longer be used.
- The drum pointer altimeter should no longer be used. Authorities asked that this recommendation be implemented with immediate effect.
- The GPWS should operate even in the case of NAV failure.

Alitalia continued to utilize the callsign of the accident aircraft ("Alitalia 404") after the accident. It was primarily used, until Alitalia ceased operations, on a Rome–Frankfurt route.

== In popular culture ==
The crash of Alitalia flight 404 was featured in the eighth episode of the 18th season of Mayday: Air Disasters. The episode was titled "Deadly Inclination".
