= Mammutmuseum Niederweningen =

Paleontological and geological museum in the Canton of Zürich, Switzerland

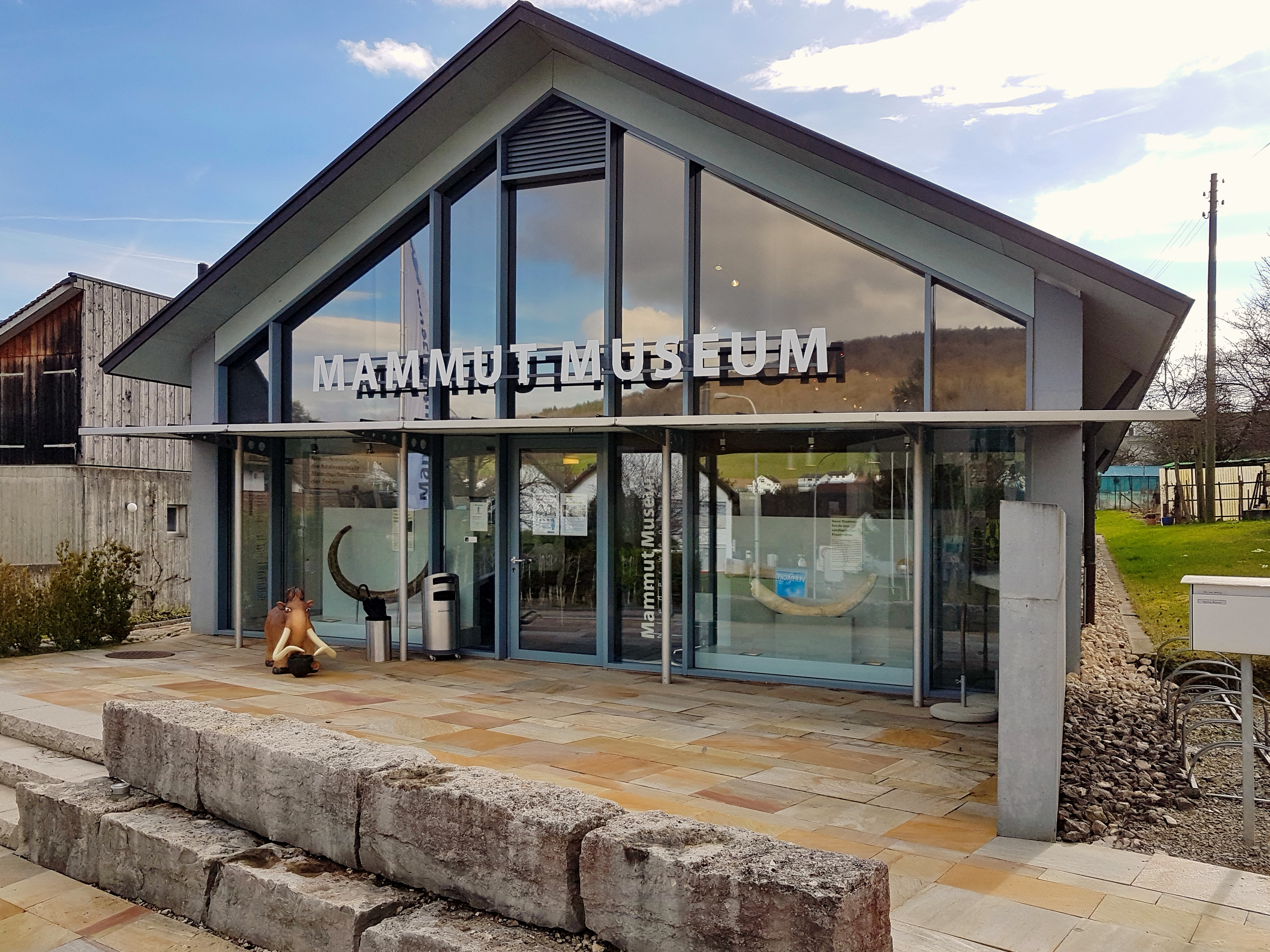

- Location in Switzerland Location in the canton of Zurich
- Established: 2005
- Location: Im Mitteldorf 1, CH-8166 Niederweningen, Switzerland
- Coordinates: 47°30′19″N 8°22′38″E
- Type: Mammoth and geology museum
- Visitors: 30,000 (2014)
- Public transit access: Zurich S-Bahn, S15
- Website: Official website (in German)

The Mammutmuseum Niederweningen, lit. 'Mammoth Museum Niederweningen', is a paleontological and geological museum in the municipality of Niederweningen in the Wehntal (Wehn Valley), canton of Zurich, Switzerland, and one of the few mammoth museums in Europe.

== Background ==
About 185,000 years ago (Pleistocene epoch), a side lobe of the Walensee/Rhine glacier overlapped on the threshold at the present Pfannenstiel eastern slope from Hombrechtikon into the Glatttal towards Niederweningen, and eroded the overdeepened rock rut of the present Wehntal area. During melting of the glacier about 180,000 to 150,000 years ago, the Wehntal, lower Glatttal and Furttal valleys filled with cold glacial lakes. After another glacier maximum about 140,000 years ago, the ice melted in the last Eemian (interglacial) period back far into the alpine valleys, and during the Würm glaciation and again about 45,000 years ago, mammoths and other Ice Age animals lived in the largely silted Wehntal. With the increasing warming period about 20,000 years ago, the glaciers melted away in stages, initially to present-day Zurich and then Hurden, where they formed the Seedamm (west of the Obersee) and the Ufenau, Lützelau and Heilig Hüsli islands in Lake Zurich, respectively. The glacier finally retreated to the Alps.

== History and orientation ==
In 1890 the most important site of Ice Age animals in Switzerland was discovered in Niederweningen: 100 bones, molar teeth and tusks of at least 7 different individuals of mammoths, including a very young calf, were found in a peat horizon at the base of a gravel pit.

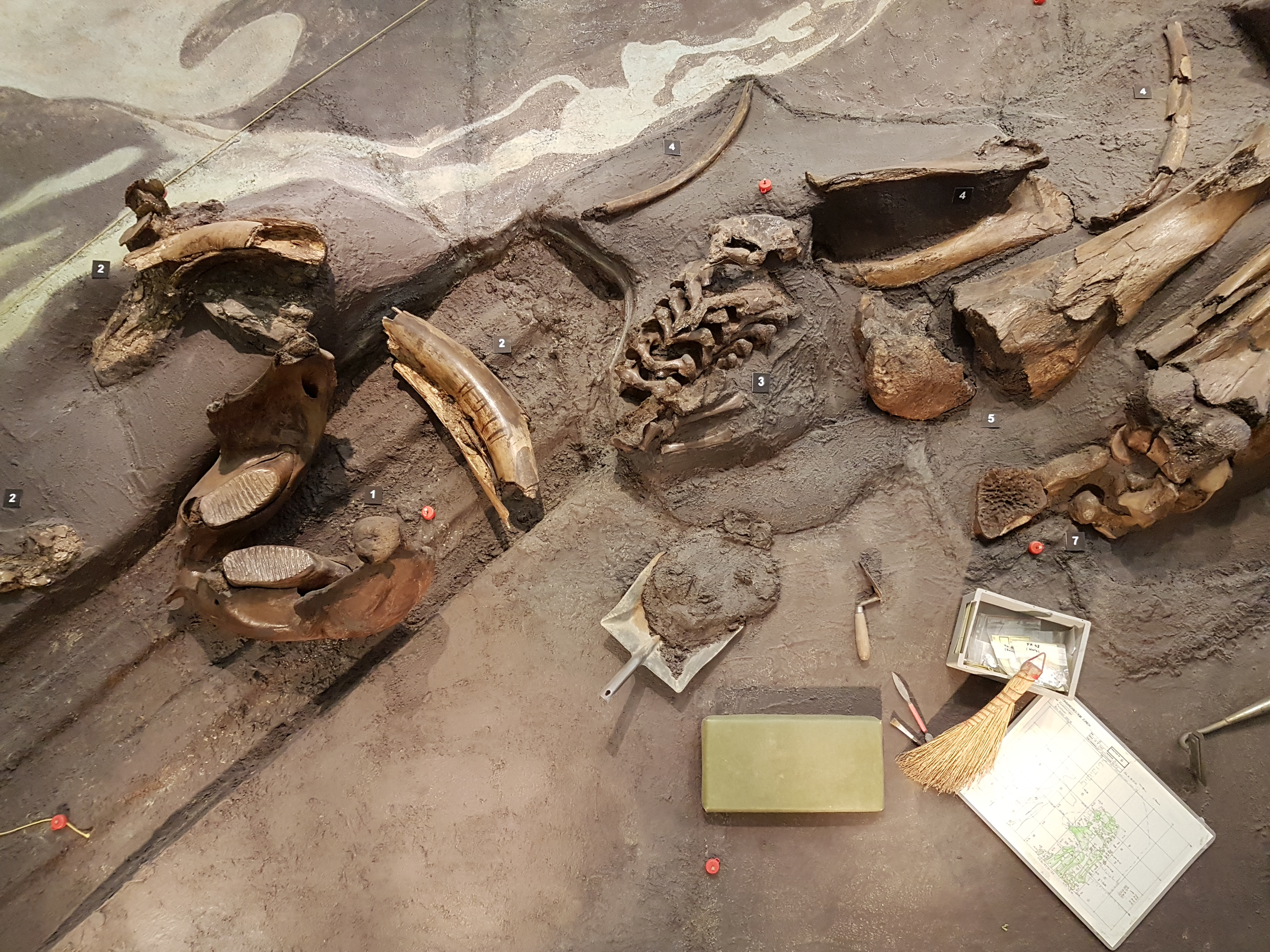
2003 mammoth find in Niederwenigen, display at the museum

In particular, the uppermost deposits with the so-called Mammuttorf (lit. 'mammoth turf') layer were studied up to about 5 metres (16 ft) depth, and between 1983 and 1985 by using three research boreholes to a depth of 21 metres (69 ft). In 2003, the remains of a mammoth were found. Further finds resulted in the establishment of the present Mammutmuseum Niederweningen near the site of the first findings.

Various exhibits range from the colonization in historical times to the flora and fauna of the Würm Ice Age, and further back to the living resources of the tropical Jura sea. Along with the historical finds of 1890/91, at least another ten mammoths have been found nearby, including a very young mammoth calf. Other fossil finds are of other glacial animals, such as woolly rhinoceros, wild horse, steppe bison, wolf and cave hyena.

In October 2015, an interactive multimedia installation for visitors was inaugurated, when the exhibition was renewed on the occasion of the museum's 10th anniversary. Some of the most important objects in the museum are the reconstructions of the 2003 finding and of a mammoth calf found near the museum site in 2005. The museum also houses the geological project Eiszeiten und Klimawandel der vergangenen 500 000 Jahre im Wehntal ("Ice ages and climate variations of the past 500,000 years in the Wehn Valley"). In the past ten years more than 41,000 visitors have viewed the exhibitions. The small museum team is also supported by a volunteer team of 35 active members of its booster club.

== Facilities ==
Public transportation is provided by the Zurich S-Bahn line S15, which operates half-hourly between Zürich HB and Niederweningen Dorf railway station. The museum is located about 500 metres (0.3 mi) away from Niederweningen Dorf railway station.

The museum only opens on Sundays from 2 pm to 5 pm (as of May 2016), but after-hours visits are available by appointment, as well as guided tours for groups.

== See also ==
- List of museums in Switzerland
- Paleolithic in Switzerland
