= Siglistorf =

- Municipality
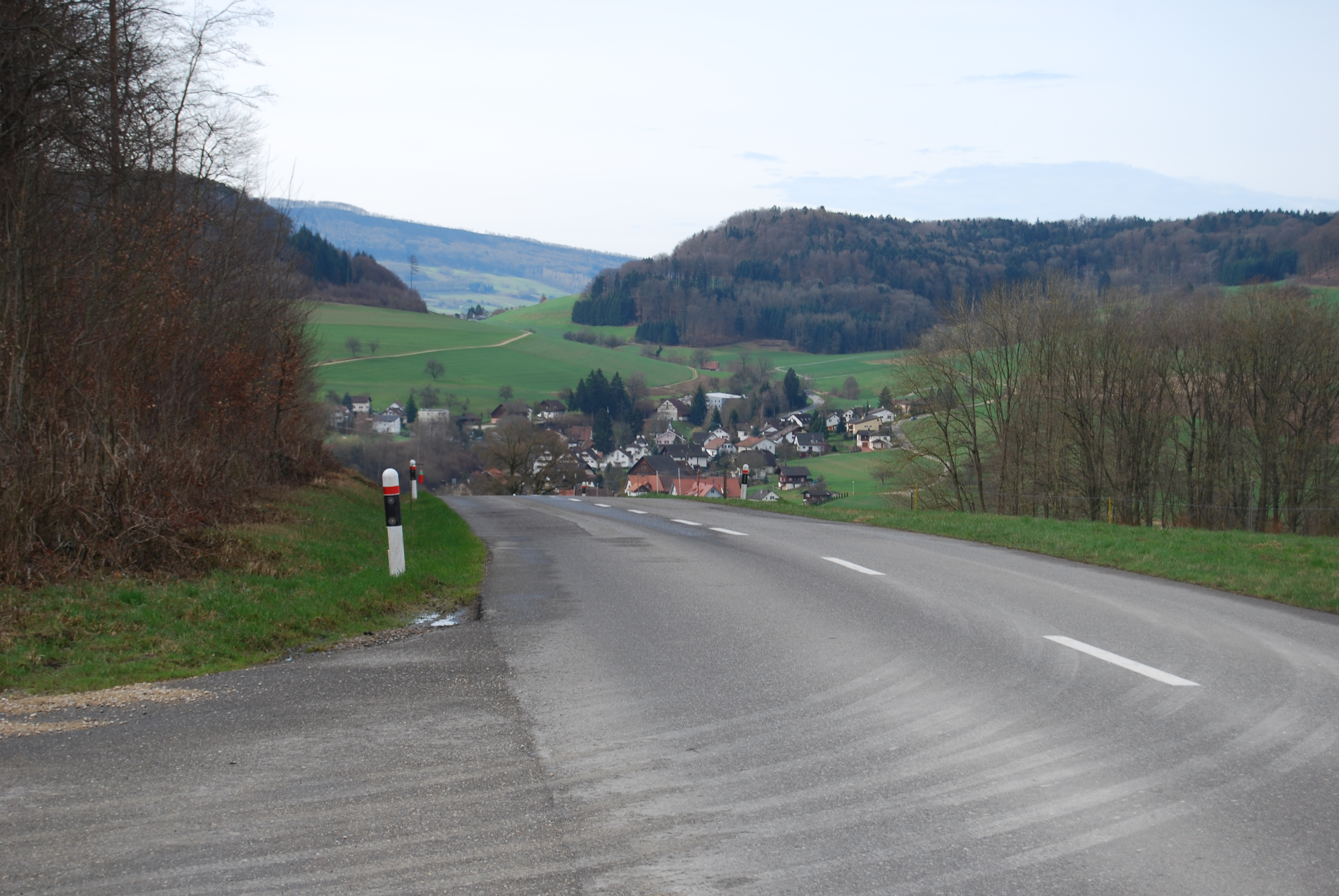

- Flag Coat of arms
- Location of Siglistorf
- Location within Switzerland Location within Canton of Aargau
- Coordinates: 47°33′N 8°23′E
- Country: Switzerland
- Canton: Aargau
- District: Zurzach

Area
  - Total: 5.51 km^{2} (2.13 sq mi)
- Elevation: 444 m (1,457 ft)

Population (December 2005)
  - Total: 557
  - Density: 101/km^{2} (262/sq mi)
- Time zone: UTC+01:00 (CET)
  - Summer (DST): UTC+02:00 (CEST)
- Postal code: 5462
- SFOS number: 4319
- ISO 3166 code: CH-AG
- Surrounded by: Bachs (ZH), Fisibach, Niederweningen (ZH), Oberweningen (ZH), Schleinikon (ZH), Schneisingen, Wislikofen
- Website: www.siglistorf.ch

Siglistorf is a municipality in the district of Zurzach in the canton of Aargau in Switzerland.

== Geography ==
Siglistorf has an area, as of 2009, of 5.51 square kilometers (2.13 sq mi). Of this area, 2.29 km^{2} (0.88 sq mi) or 41.6% is used for agricultural purposes, while 2.89 km^{2} (1.12 sq mi) or 52.5% is forested. Of the rest of the land, 0.33 km^{2} (0.13 sq mi) or 6.0% is settled (buildings or roads) and 0.02 km^{2} (4.9 acres) or 0.4% is unproductive land.

Of the built up area, housing and buildings made up 3.1% and transportation infrastructure made up 2.5%. Out of the forested land, 51.2% of the total land area is heavily forested and 1.3% is covered with orchards or small clusters of trees. Of the agricultural land, 23.6% is used for growing crops and 16.7% is pastures, while 1.3% is used for orchards or vine crops. Of the unproductive areas, and .

== Coat of arms ==
The blazon of the municipal coat of arms is Azure a Deer salient to sinister Or on Coupeaux Vert.

== Demographics ==
Siglistorf has a population (as of December 2020) of 669 As of 2008, 43.4% of the population are foreign nationals. Over the last 10 years (1997–2007) the population has changed at a rate of 1.5%. Most of the population (as of 2000) speaks German(92.7%), with Albanian being second most common ( 4.8%) and English being third ( 0.8%).

As of 2008, the gender distribution of the population was 51.0% male and 49.0% female. The population was made up of 253 Swiss men (40.4% of the population), and 67 (10.7%) non-Swiss men. There were 259 Swiss women (41.3%), and 48 (7.7%) non-Swiss women. In 2008 there were 5 live births to Swiss citizens and 4 births to non-Swiss citizens, and in same time span there were 4 deaths of Swiss citizens. Ignoring immigration and emigration, the population of Swiss citizens increased by 1 while the foreign population increased by 4. There were 1 Swiss woman who emigrated from Switzerland to another country, 13 non-Swiss men who emigrated from Switzerland to another country and 12 non-Swiss women who emigrated from Switzerland to another country. The total Swiss population change in 2008 (from all sources) was an increase of 16 and the non-Swiss population change was an increase of 20 people. This represents a population growth rate of 6.1%.

The age distribution, as of 2008, in Siglistorf is; 69 children or 11.5% of the population are between 0 and 9 years old and 78 teenagers or 13.0% are between 10 and 19. Of the adult population, 56 people or 9.3% of the population are between 20 and 29 years old. 86 people or 14.3% are between 30 and 39, 117 people or 19.4% are between 40 and 49, and 96 people or 15.9% are between 50 and 59. The senior population distribution is 62 people or 10.3% of the population are between 60 and 69 years old, 13 people or 2.2% are between 70 and 79, there are 21 people or 3.5% who are between 80 and 89, and there are 4 people or 0.7% who are 90 and older.

As of 2000, there were 25 homes with 1 or 2 persons in the household, 81 homes with 3 or 4 persons in the household, and 87 homes with 5 or more persons in the household. As of 2000, there were 206 private households (homes and apartments) in the municipality, and an average of 2.5 persons per household. In 2008 there were 91 single family homes (or 36.4% of the total) out of a total of 250 homes and apartments. There were a total of 1 empty apartments for a 0.4% vacancy rate. As of 2007, the construction rate of new housing units was 0 new units per 1000 residents.

In the 2007 federal election the most popular party was the SVP which received 48.89% of the vote. The next three most popular parties were the CVP (22.68%), the SP (8.2%) and the FDP (7.84%). In the federal election, a total of 157 votes were cast, and the voter turnout was 41.8%.

The historical population is given in the following table:

Historical population
Year	Pop.	±%
1975	307	—
1980	355	+15.6%
1990	536	+51.0%
2000	537	+0.2%

== Economy ==
As of 2007, Siglistorf had an unemployment rate of 3.46%. As of 2005, there were 22 people employed in the primary economic sector and about 9 businesses involved in this sector. 10 people are employed in the secondary sector and there are 6 businesses in this sector. 89 people are employed in the tertiary sector, with 28 businesses in this sector.

In 2000 there were 302 workers who lived in the municipality. Of these, 235 or about 77.8% of the residents worked outside Siglistorf while 39 people commuted into the municipality for work. There were a total of 106 jobs (of at least 6 hours per week) in the municipality. Of the working population, 10.1% used public transportation to get to work, and 63.5% used a private car.

== Religion ==
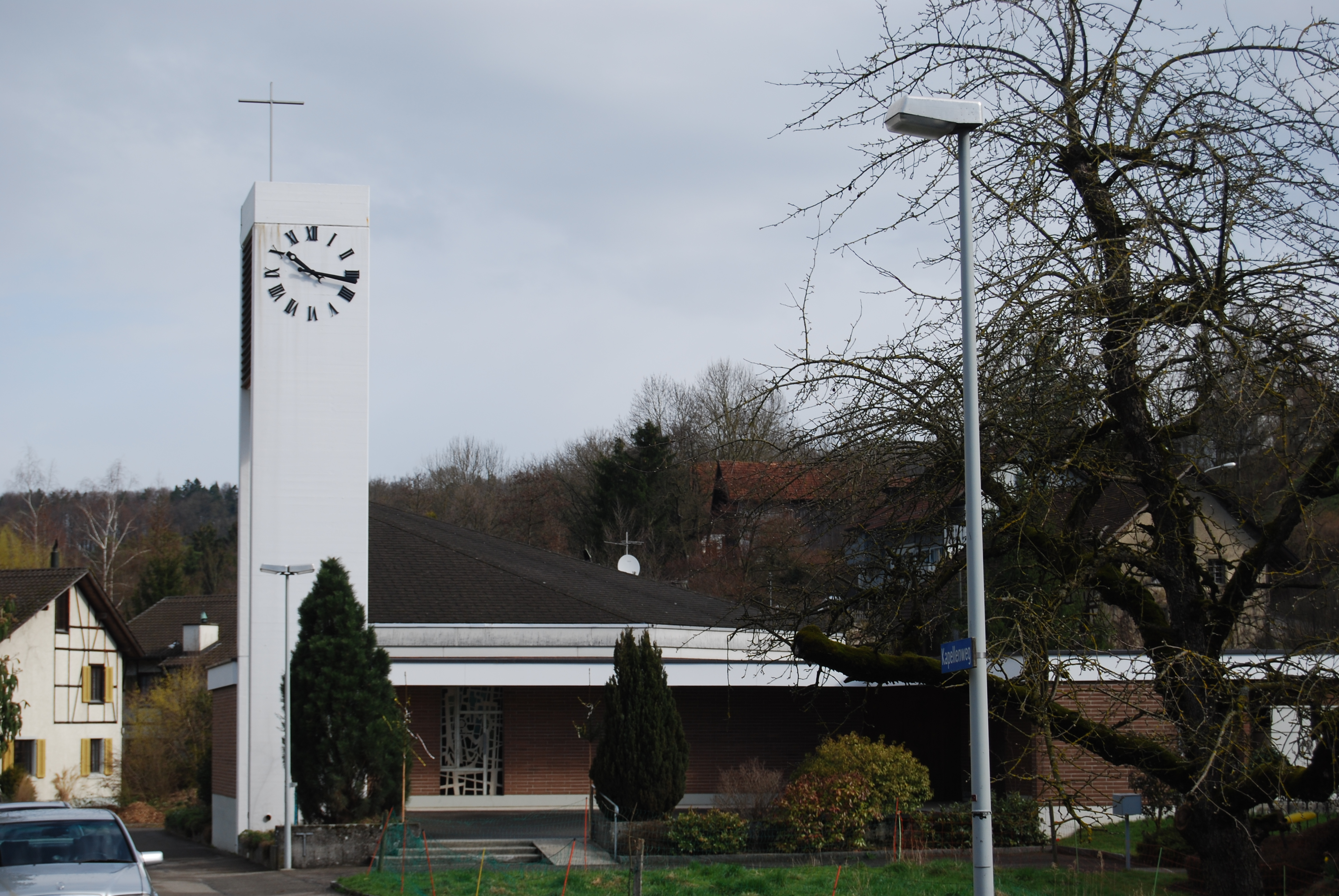
Church of Sigilistorf

From the 2000 census, 287 or 55.3% were Roman Catholic, while 134 or 25.8% belonged to the Swiss Reformed Church.

== Education ==
In Siglistorf about 77.7% of the population (between age 25-64) have completed either non-mandatory upper secondary education or additional higher education (either university or a Fachhochschule). Of the school age population (in the 2008/2009 school year), there are 51 students attending primary school in the municipality.
