= Schneisingen =

- Municipality
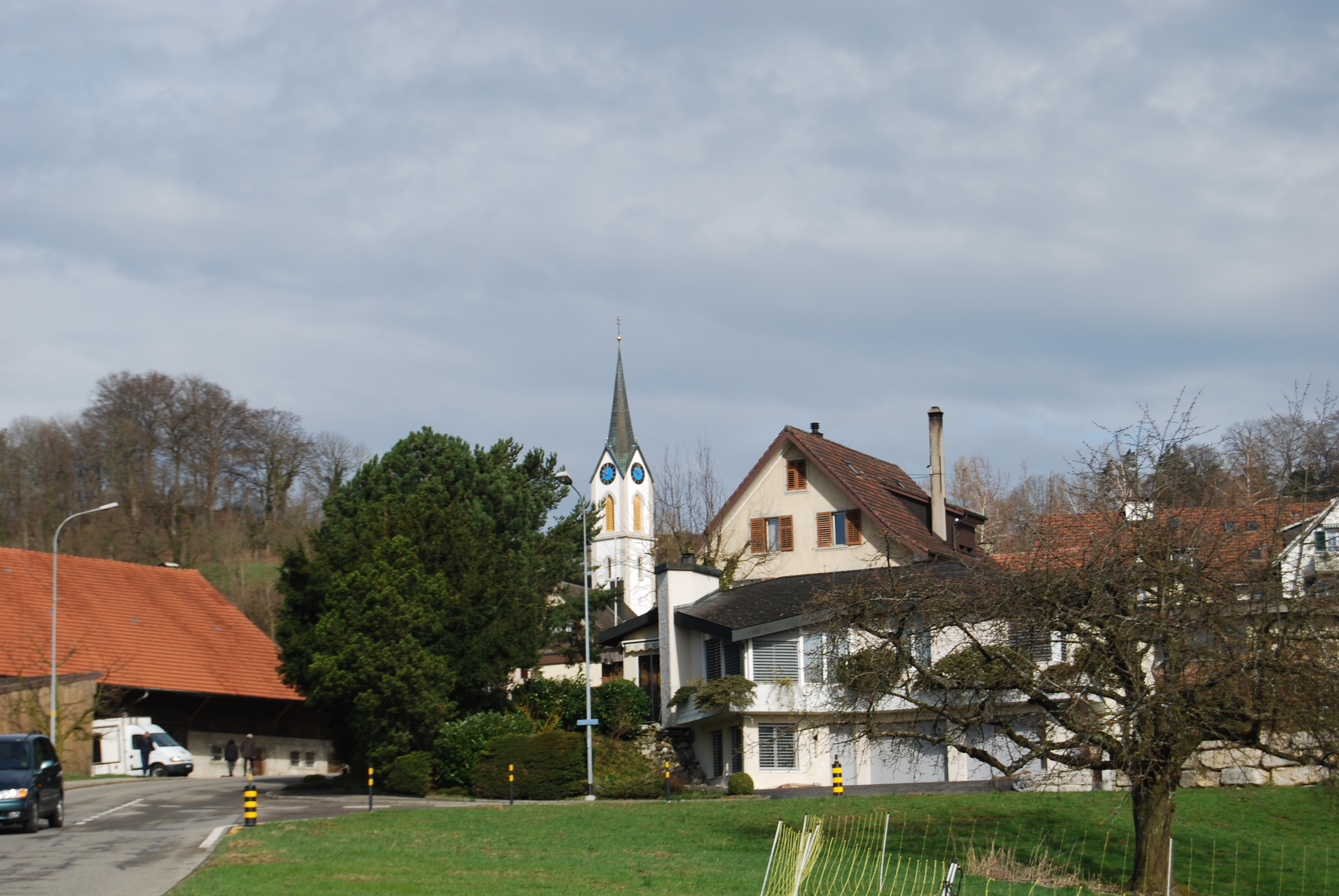

- Flag Coat of arms
- Location of Schneisingen
- Location within Switzerland Location within Canton of Aargau
- Coordinates: 47°31′N 8°22′E
- Country: Switzerland
- Canton: Aargau
- District: Zurzach

Area
  - Total: 8.25 km^{2} (3.19 sq mi)
- Elevation: 493 m (1,617 ft)

Population (December 2005)
  - Total: 1,226
  - Density: 149/km^{2} (385/sq mi)
- Time zone: UTC+01:00 (CET)
  - Summer (DST): UTC+02:00 (CEST)
- Postal code: 5425
- SFOS number: 4318
- ISO 3166 code: CH-AG
- Surrounded by: Lengnau, Niederweningen (ZH), Siglistorf, Unterehrendingen, Wislikofen
- Website: www.schneisingen.ch

Schneisingen is a municipality in the district of Zurzach in the canton of Aargau in Switzerland.

== Geography ==
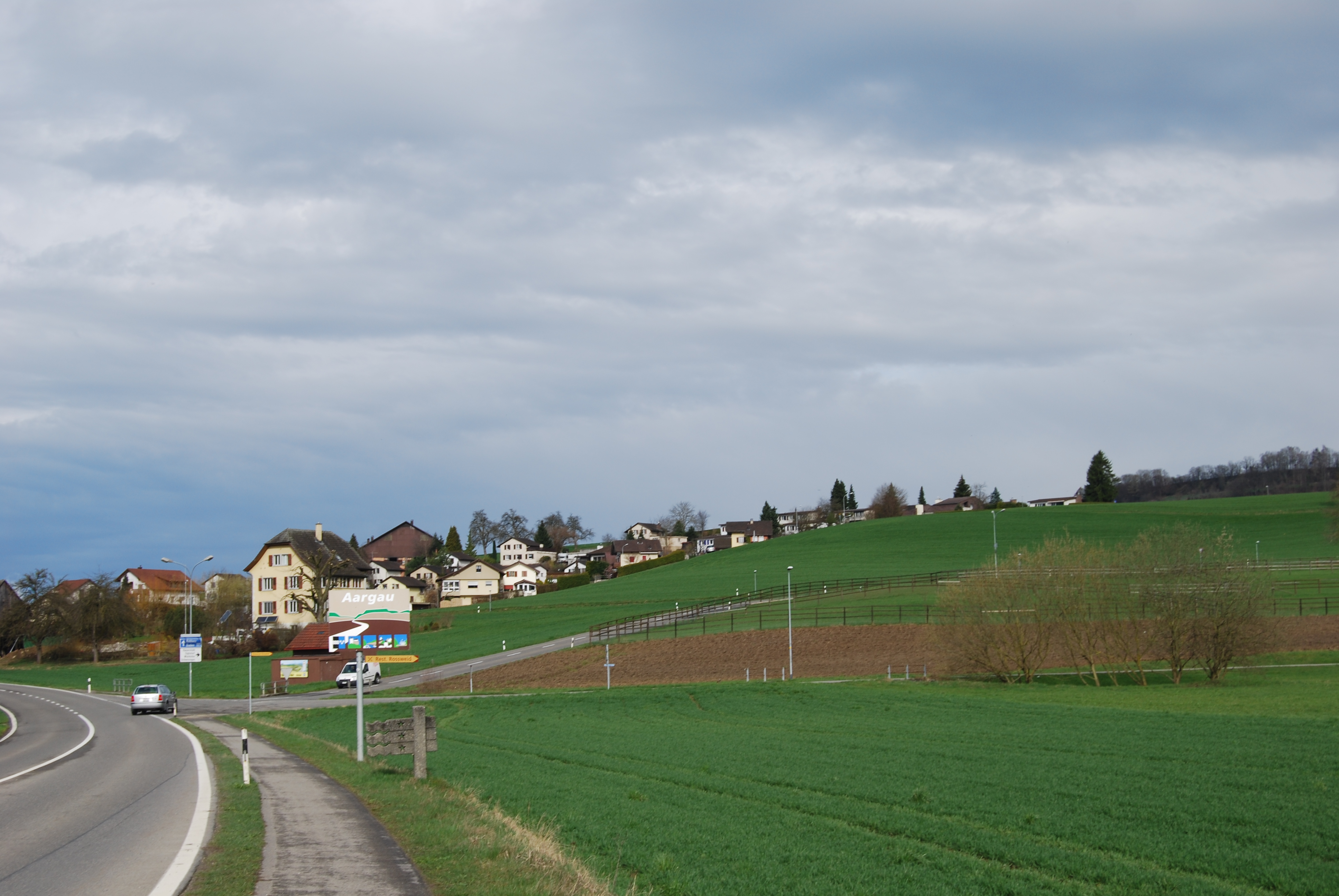
Schneisingen

Aerial view (1971)

Located in the Surb river valley, Schneisingen has an area, as of 2009, of 8.25 square kilometers (3.19 sq mi). Of this area, 4.08 km^{2} (1.58 sq mi) or 49.5% is used for agricultural purposes, while 3.43 km^{2} (1.32 sq mi) or 41.6% is forested. Of the rest of the land, 0.77 km^{2} (0.30 sq mi) or 9.3% is settled (buildings or roads).

Of the built up area, housing and buildings made up 5.2% and transportation infrastructure made up 2.5%. Out of the forested land, 40.4% of the total land area is heavily forested and 1.2% is covered with orchards or small clusters of trees. Of the agricultural land, 38.4% is used for growing crops and 9.2% is pastures, while 1.8% is used for orchards or vine crops.

== Coat of arms ==
The blazon of the municipal coat of arms is Azure three Peaks Vert and in chief two Mullets Or.

== Demographics ==
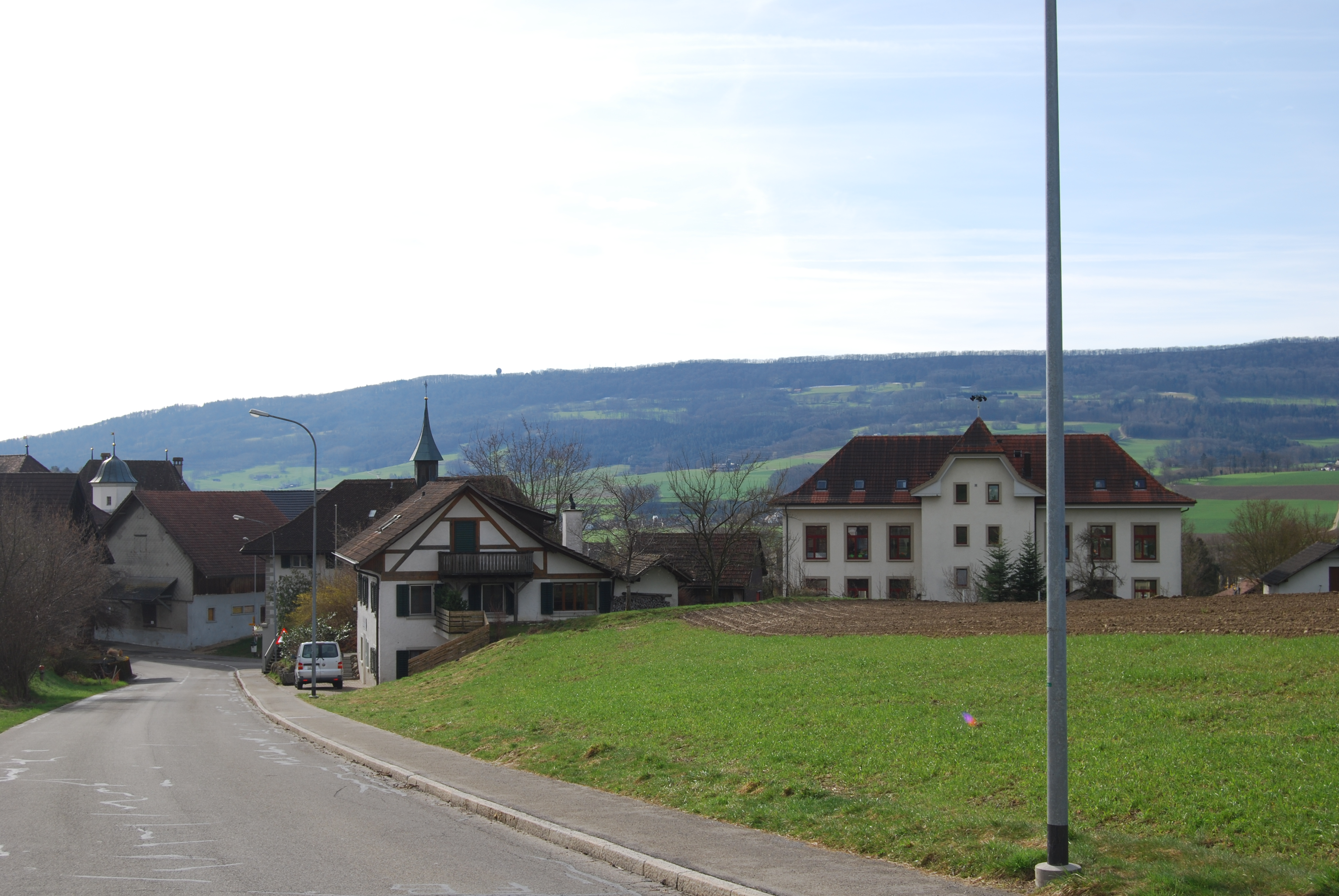
Houses in Schneisingen

Schneisingen has a population (as of December 2020) of 1,491. As of 2008, 45.5% of the population are foreign nationals. Over the last 10 years (1997–2007) the population has changed at a rate of 4.5%. Most of the population (as of 2000) speaks German (95.5%), with Albanian being second most common ( 1.1%) and French being third ( 0.6%).

As of 2008, the gender distribution of the population was 50.1% male and 49.9% female. The population was made up of 580 Swiss men (46.0% of the population), and 52 (4.1%) non-Swiss men. There were 592 Swiss women (46.9%), and 38 (3.0%) non-Swiss women. In 2008 there were 9 live births to Swiss citizens and 2 births to non-Swiss citizens, and in same time span there were 6 deaths of Swiss citizens. Ignoring immigration and emigration, the population of Swiss citizens increased by 3 while the foreign population increased by 2. There were 3 non-Swiss men who emigrated from Switzerland to another country and 2 non-Swiss women who immigrated from another country to Switzerland. The total Swiss population change in 2008 (from all sources) was a decrease of 4 and the non-Swiss population change was an increase of 3 people. This represents a population growth rate of -0.1%.

The age distribution, as of 2008, in Schneisingen is; 140 children or 10.9% of the population are between 0 and 9 years old and 117 teenagers or 9.1% are between 10 and 19. Of the adult population, 111 people or 8.7% of the population are between 20 and 29 years old. 176 people or 13.8% are between 30 and 39, 222 people or 17.4% are between 40 and 49, and 188 people or 14.7% are between 50 and 59. The senior population distribution is 174 people or 13.6% of the population are between 60 and 69 years old, 93 people or 7.3% are between 70 and 79, there are 49 people or 3.8% who are between 80 and 89, and there are 9 people or 0.7% who are 90 and older.

As of 2000, there were 26 homes with 1 or 2 persons in the household, 185 homes with 3 or 4 persons in the household, and 259 homes with 5 or more persons in the household. As of 2000, there were 474 private households (homes and apartments) in the municipality, and an average of 2.6 persons per household. In 2008 there were 291 single family homes (or 53.0% of the total) out of a total of 549 homes and apartments. There were a total of 7 empty apartments for a 1.3% vacancy rate. As of 2007, the construction rate of new housing units was 11.1 new units per 1000 residents.

In the 2007 federal election the most popular party was the SVP which received 37.69% of the vote. The next three most popular parties were the CVP (25.32%), the SP (14.08%) and the FDP (8.97%). In the federal election, a total of 538 votes were cast, and the voter turnout was 56.6%.

The historical population is given in the following table:

Historical population
Year	Pop.	±%
1975	955	—
1980	1,037	+8.6%
1990	1,141	+10.0%
2000	1,248	+9.4%

== Economy ==
As of 2007, Schneisingen had an unemployment rate of 1.08%. As of 2005, there were 80 people employed in the primary economic sector and about 26 businesses involved in this sector. 97 people are employed in the secondary sector and there are 17 businesses in this sector. 196 people are employed in the tertiary sector, with 38 businesses in this sector.

In 2000 there were 672 workers who lived in the municipality. Of these, 535 or about 79.6% of the residents worked outside Schneisingen while 104 people commuted into the municipality for work. There were a total of 241 jobs (of at least 6 hours per week) in the municipality. Of the working population, 13.8% used public transportation to get to work, and 51.9% used a private car.

== Religion ==
From the 2000 census, 707 or 57.4% were Roman Catholic, while 349 or 28.3% belonged to the Swiss Reformed Church.

== Education ==
In Schneisingen about 85.9% of the population (between age 25-64) have completed either non-mandatory upper secondary education or additional higher education (either university or a Fachhochschule). Of the school age population (in the 2008/2009 school year), there are 104 students attending primary school in the municipality.
