= Hohentengen am Hochrhein =

- Municipality
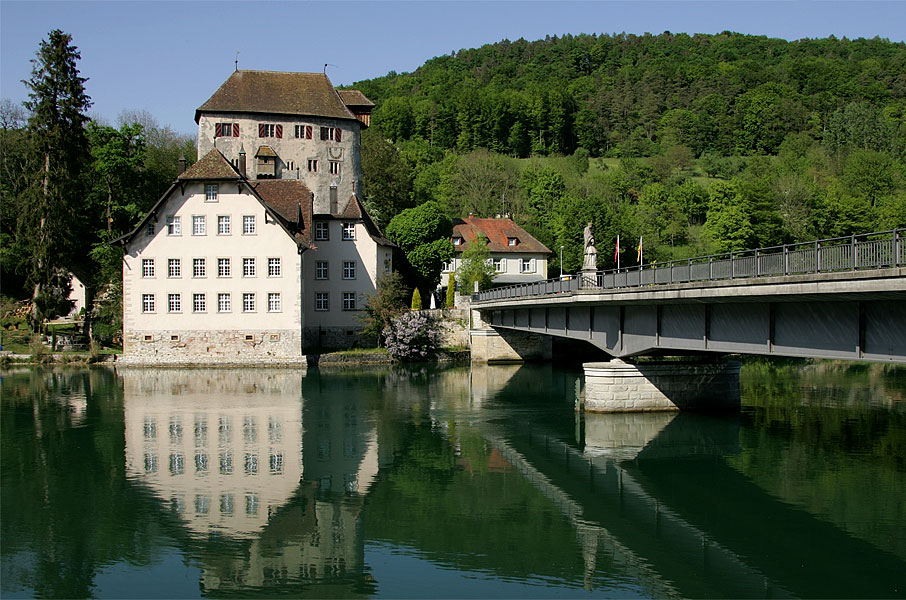
- Schloss Rötteln

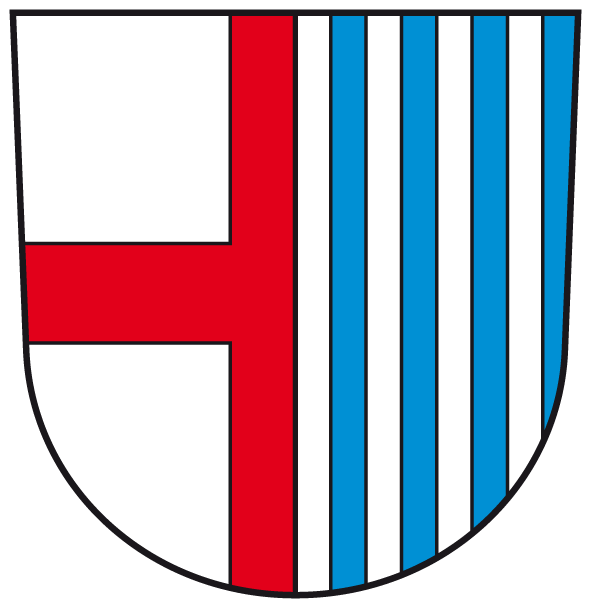
- Coat of arms

- Location of Hohentengen am Hochrhein within Waldshut district
- Interactive map of Hohentengen am Hochrhein
- Location within Germany Location within Baden-Württemberg
- Coordinates: 47°34′12″N 08°26′02″E
- Country: Germany
- State: Baden-Württemberg
- Admin. region: Freiburg
- District: Waldshut

Government
  - Mayor (2023–31): Jürgen Wiener

Area
  - Total: 27.57 km^{2} (10.64 sq mi)
- Elevation: 368 m (1,207 ft)

Population (2025-12-31)
  - Total: 3,652
  - Density: 132.5/km^{2} (343.1/sq mi)
- Time zone: UTC+01:00 (CET)
  - Summer (DST): UTC+02:00 (CEST)
- Postal codes: 79801
- Dialling codes: 07742
- Vehicle registration: WT
- Website: www.hohentengen.de

Hohentengen am Hochrhein (German pronunciation: [ˈhoːəntɛŋən ʔam ˈhoːxʁaɪn], lit. 'Hohentengen on the High Rhine') is a municipality in the district of Waldshut in Baden-Württemberg in Germany.

== Geography ==
=== Location ===
The village Hohentengen lies on the northern banks of the Rhine, overlooking Switzerland. The right weather-conditions allow a view of the Swiss Alpes from the Kalten Wangen (lit. "cold cheeks"), a mountain in the district of Stetten. Hohentengen am Hochrhein comprises six districts: Hohentengen, Lienheim, Herdern, Bergöschingen, Günzgen, and Stetten.

=== Neighboring towns ===
Hohentengen borders Klettgau to the north, the Swiss towns of Wasterkingen and Hüntwangen to the east, Glattfelden and Weiach to the south, which are all part of the Kanton Zürich, as well as Kaiserstuhl, Aargau, Fisibach, and Rümikon, which are part of the Kanton Aargau. To the West, Hohentengen borders the German town of Küssaberg.

== Villages ==
The following villages are located within the municipality of Hohentengen am Hochrhein.

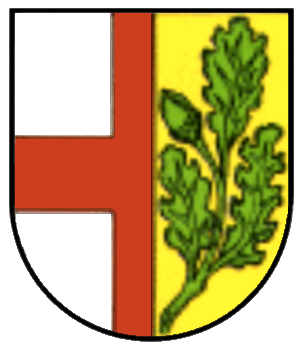
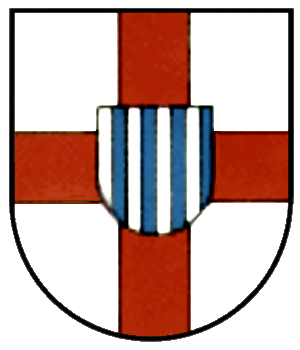
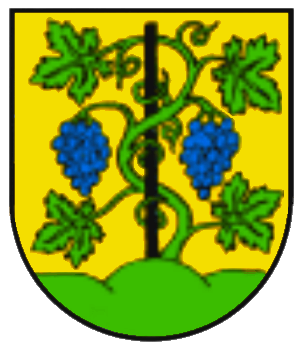
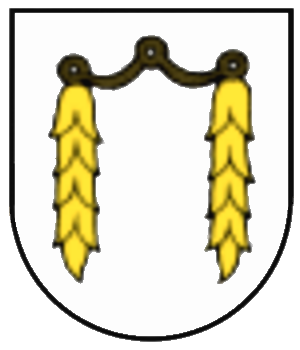
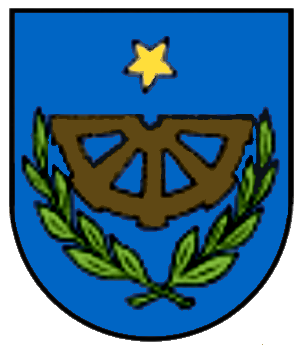
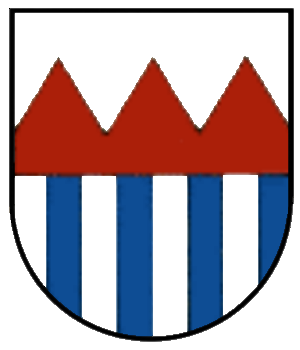
The town of Hohentengen, the center of the municipality and the seat of the municipal government.
Bergöschingen, the smallest village in the municipality, which is characterized by agriculture and natural spaces.
Lienheim, the second-largest village in the municipality
Günzgen, a village situated directly on the border, neighboring the Swiss municipality of Wasterkingen. The picturesque village achieved its current look following a long period of planning.
Herdern, the third-largest village, located on the banks of the Rhine just east of Hohentengen. It is located halfway to the Eglisau-Glattfelden Power Plant.
Stetten, a village with nearly 300 residents and one of the smallest villages in the municipality. Stetten is located at the foot of the mountain Kalten Wangen, surrounded by fields and pastures. Hiking on Kalten Wangen is a popular summer activity, especially due to a view of the alps during clear weather.
