= Weiach =

- Municipality
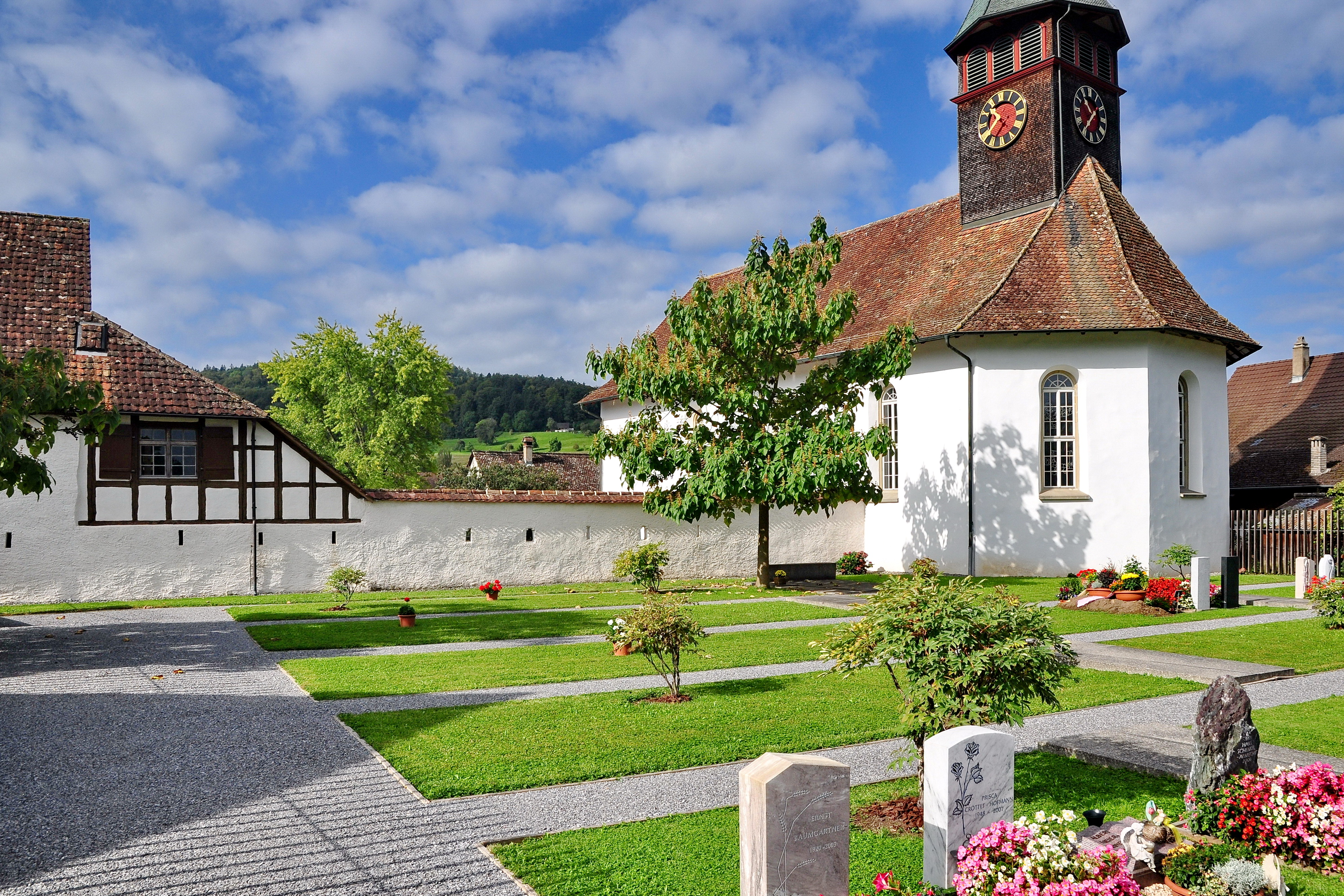

- Flag Coat of arms
- Location of Weiach
- Location within Switzerland Location within Canton of Zurich
- Coordinates: 47°33′N 8°26′E
- Country: Switzerland
- Canton: Zurich
- District: Dielsdorf

Area
  - Total: 9.64 km^{2} (3.72 sq mi)
- Elevation: 390 m (1,280 ft)
- Highest elevation (Haggenberg (Stadlerberg)): 615 m (2,018 ft)
- Lowest elevation (Rhine): 332 m (1,089 ft)

Population (December 2020)
  - Total: 1,990
  - Density: 206/km^{2} (535/sq mi)
- Time zone: UTC+01:00 (CET)
  - Summer (DST): UTC+02:00 (CEST)
- Postal code: 8187
- SFOS number: 102
- ISO 3166 code: CH-ZH
- Surrounded by: Fisibach (AG), Kaiserstuhl (AG), Hohentengen am Hochrhein (D), Glattfelden, Stadel bei Niederglatt, Bachs
- Website: www.weiach.ch

Weiach is a municipality in the district of Dielsdorf in the canton of Zürich in Switzerland.

== History ==
Aerial view from 600 m by Walter Mittelholzer (1925)

Weiach is first mentioned in 1271. It has belonged to Swiss Confederation since 1424. Since 1962 there has been a gravel industry located in Weiach. On 14 November 1990, Alitalia Flight 404 crashed into Stadlerberg Mountain near Weiach while attempting to land at Zurich Airport. The crash, which was caused by a faulty navigation system, killed all 40 passengers and 6 crew.

== Geography ==
Weiach has an area of 9.5 square kilometers (3.7 sq mi). Of this area, 36.9% is used for agricultural purposes, while 49.5% is forested. Of the rest of the land, 11.7% is settled (buildings or roads) and the remainder (1.9%) is non-productive (rivers, glaciers or mountains).

Weiach (dialect: «Weych») is situated at approximately 390 metres above sea level in the northwestern corner of the Zürich Lowlands («Zuercher Unterland»), at the cantonal boundary between Zürich and Aargau. The River Rhine, flows some 100 meters north of the village and forms the natural border line to Germany, marking the lowest spot in the canton of Zürich (332 meters above sea level).

== Population ==
Historical population

Year	Pop.	±%
1634	361	—
1640	428	+18.6%
1650	483	+12.9%
1670	624	+29.2%
1689	767	+22.9%
1695	583	−24.0%
1711	668	+14.6%
1754	547	−18.1%
1759	573	+4.8%
1790	530	−7.5%
1799	548	+3.4%
1820	550	+0.4%
1827	700	+27.3%
1836	675	−3.6%
1850	716	+6.1%
1860	720	+0.6%

Year	Pop.	±%
1870	737	+2.4%
1880	743	+0.8%
1888	643	−13.5%
1900	601	−6.5%
1910	583	−3.0%
1920	655	+12.3%
1930	642	−2.0%
1941	610	−5.0%
1950	590	−3.3%
1960	646	+9.5%
1970	688	+6.5%
1980	692	+0.6%
1990	719	+3.9%
2000	994	+38.2%
2010	980	−1.4%

The Zürich Tax Records (Zürcher Steuerbücher) of 1470 only contains a record of the manor of Weiach. At the time, the village comprised 16 households, with 48 inhabitants over the age of 15 liable to pay tax. Between 1634 and 1760, having been requested to do so by the Zürich authorities, the priests kept detailed records of population size, albeit with sporadic intervals. Later figures have been taken from the following sources: 1790 Werdmüller's Memorabilia Tigurina, 1799 Priests' Inquiry of the Helvetian Government, 1820 Erni's Memorabilia Tigurina, 1827 Lutz's Vollständige Beschreibung des Schweizerlandes. The figure for 1836 is based on the Zürich cantonal census. Figures from 1850 onwards have been taken from the Confederational Census. (The criteria for recording population data have changed considerably over the centuries. Each interpretation can cause the figures to vary considerably. The figures are taken from different sources. For the years 1710 to 1820, data are hardly available.)

Over the centuries, the population size has been closely linked to the profitability of the land, since exports were rare. The resident population oscillated between 500 and 750 persons, making Weiach the largest parish in Neuamt. From the end of the 17th Century onwards, many began to look for work outside Weiach, resulting in emigration. This emigration was often to the United States. Many of the forefathers of Americans with the surname Baumgardner were originally from Weiach.

By the 1960s and 1970s, a few new apartment blocks had been built here and there. In the wake of the agglomeration of Zürich, Weiach became subsumed by the city in the mid 1980s. New residential areas were designated according to the Quartierpläne. This triggered a construction boom, beginning on the edge of Sanzenberg. 30 per cent of the apartments which existed in 2000 had been built in the previous ten years. The population grew by over 35 per cent thanks to the building of 80 new apartment blocks between 1991 and 2000. Never before had so many people lived simultaneously in the parish of Weiach. The start of urbanisation can be seen from the explosion in the number of single person households from 1990 (an increase of 132 per cent).

A large-scale construction project was planned at the end of 2007 to build a further 55 apartment blocks in the Bedmen area. If this goes ahead, the population figure will again pass the 1000 mark.

=== Demographics ===
Weiach has a population (as of 31 December 2020) of 1,990. As of 2007, 10.1% of the population was made up of foreign nationals. Over the last 10 years the population has grown at a rate of 6.9%. Most of the population (as of 2000) speaks German (93.6%), with Albanian being second most common ( 1.5%) and Serbo-Croatian being third ( 1.2%).

In the 2007 election the most popular party was the SVP which received 54.8% of the vote. The next three most popular parties were the SPS (12.9%), the CSP (9.4%) and the FDP (8%).

The age distribution of the population (as of 2000) is children and teenagers (0–19 years old) make up 26.7% of the population, while adults (20–64 years old) make up 61% and seniors (over 64 years old) make up 12.4%. In Weiach about 80.4% of the population (between age 25-64) have completed either non-mandatory upper secondary education or additional higher education (either university or a Fachhochschule).

Weiach has an unemployment rate of 2.46%. As of 2005, there were 47 people employed in the primary economic sector and about 17 businesses involved in this sector. 120 people are employed in the secondary sector and there are 16 businesses in this sector. 96 people are employed in the tertiary sector, with 27 businesses in this sector.
