= Bachs =

- Municipality
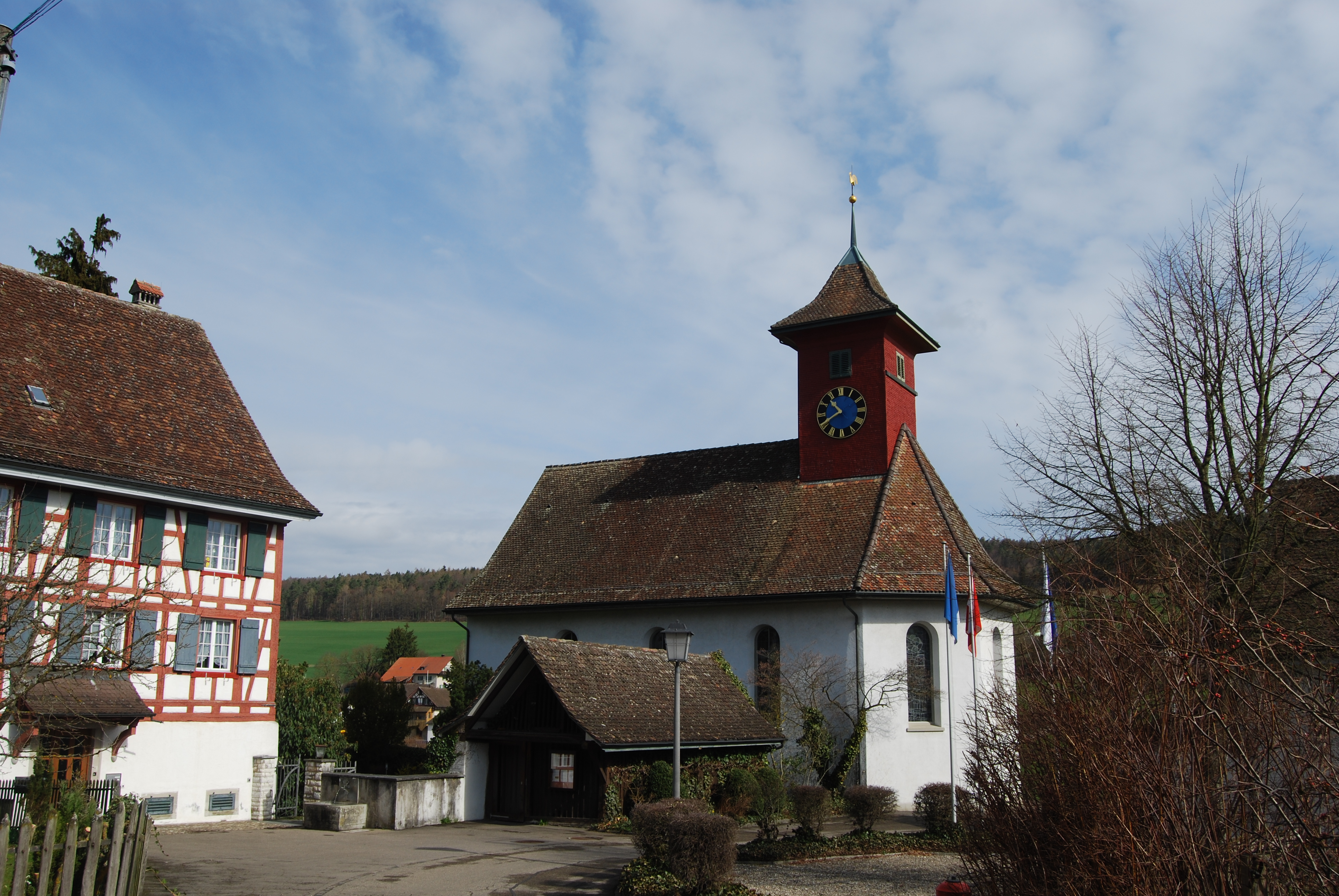

- Flag Coat of arms
- Location of Bachs
- Location within Switzerland Location within Canton of Zurich
- Coordinates: 47°31′N 8°26′E
- Country: Switzerland
- Canton: Zurich
- District: Dielsdorf

Area
  - Total: 9.12 km^{2} (3.52 sq mi)
- Elevation: 470 m (1,540 ft)

Population (December 2020)
  - Total: 613
  - Density: 67.2/km^{2} (174/sq mi)
- Time zone: UTC+01:00 (CET)
  - Summer (DST): UTC+02:00 (CEST)
- Postal code: 8164
- SFOS number: 81
- ISO 3166 code: CH-ZH
- Surrounded by: Fisibach (AG), Neerach, Oberweningen, Schöfflisdorf, Siglistorf (AG), Stadel bei Niederglatt, Steinmaur, Weiach
- Website: www.bachs.ch

Bachs is a municipality in the district of Dielsdorf in the canton of Zürich in Switzerland.

== History ==
Bachs is first mentioned in 1100 as Fusebach and Fuisipach. In 1384 the village section of Altbachs (Old Bachs) was mentioned as Obern Fisibach.

== Geography ==
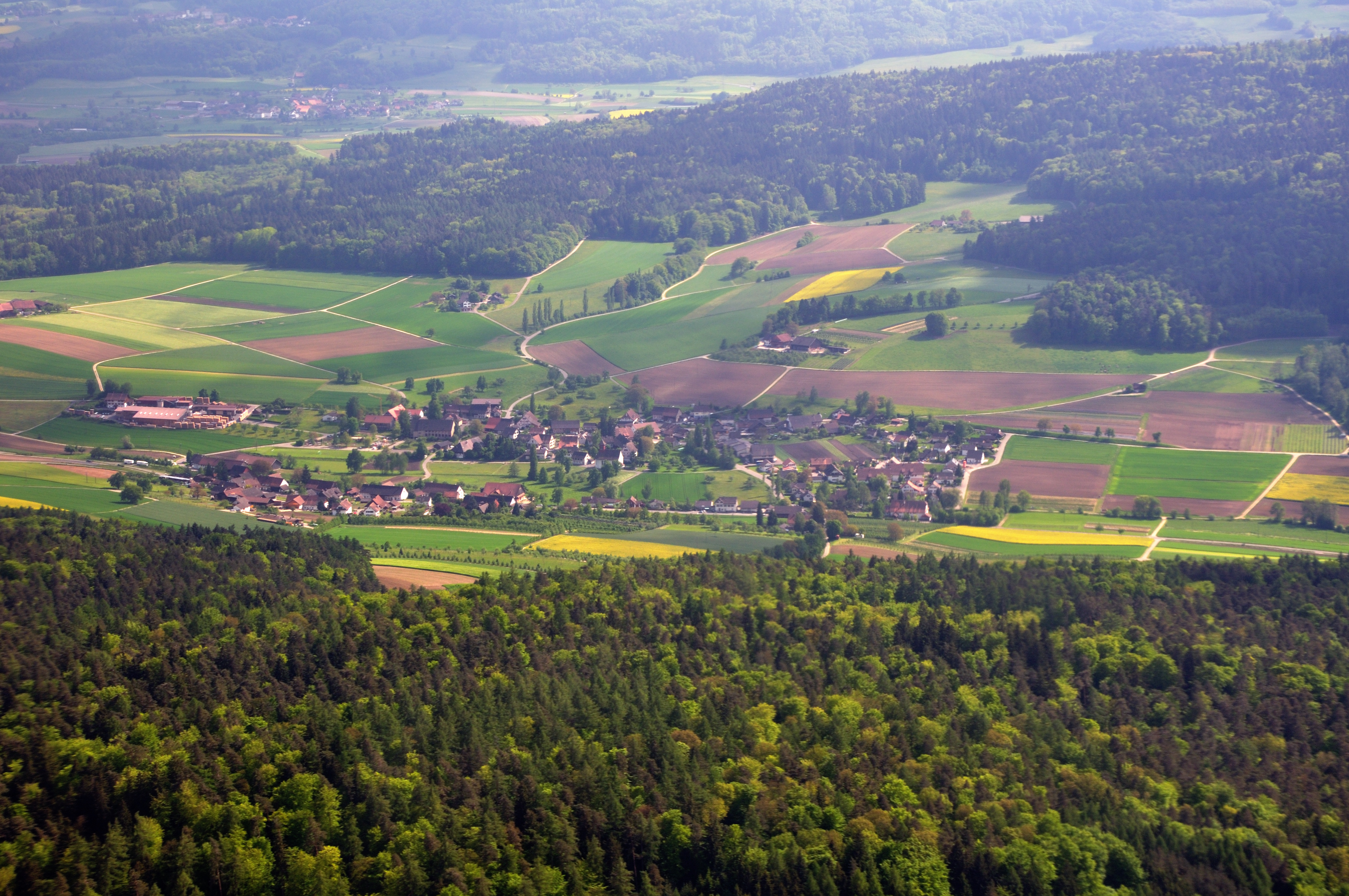
Bachs and surrounding countryside

Aerial view (1950)

Bachs has an area of 9.1 km^{2} (3.5 sq mi). Of this area, 49% is used for agricultural purposes, while 44.1% is forested. Of the rest of the land, 6.8% is settled (buildings or roads) and the remainder (0.1%) is non-productive (rivers, glaciers or mountains).

The municipality is located at the mouth of the Fisibach stream. Bachs is a village with two centers which, since the fire of 1763, are known as Alt- and Neubachs (Old and New Bachs).

== Demographics ==
Bachs has a population (as of 31 December 2020) of 613. As of 2007, 6.0% of the population was made up of foreign nationals. Over the last 10 years the population has decreased at a rate of -4%. Most of the population (as of 2000) speaks German (95.8%), with French being second most common ( 1.0%) and Spanish being third ( 0.9%).

In the 2007 election the most popular party was the SVP which received 55.1% of the vote. The next three most popular parties were the SPS (11.6%), the Green Party (10%) and the CSP (6.4%).

The age distribution of the population (as of 2000) is children and teenagers (0–19 years old) make up 25% of the population, while adults (20–64 years old) make up 62.4% and seniors (over 64 years old) make up 12.7%. About 77.8% of the population (between age 25-64) have completed either non-mandatory upper secondary education or additional higher education (either university or a Fachhochschule).

Bachs has an unemployment rate of 0.79%. As of 2005, there were 92 people employed in the primary economic sector and about 29 businesses involved in this sector. 36 people are employed in the secondary sector and there are 3 businesses in this sector. 171 people are employed in the tertiary sector, with 19 businesses in this sector. The historical population is given in the following table:

year	population
1467	11 Households 36 Adults
1634	391
1836	596
1860	673
1960	414
1990	519
