= Oberweningen =

- Municipality
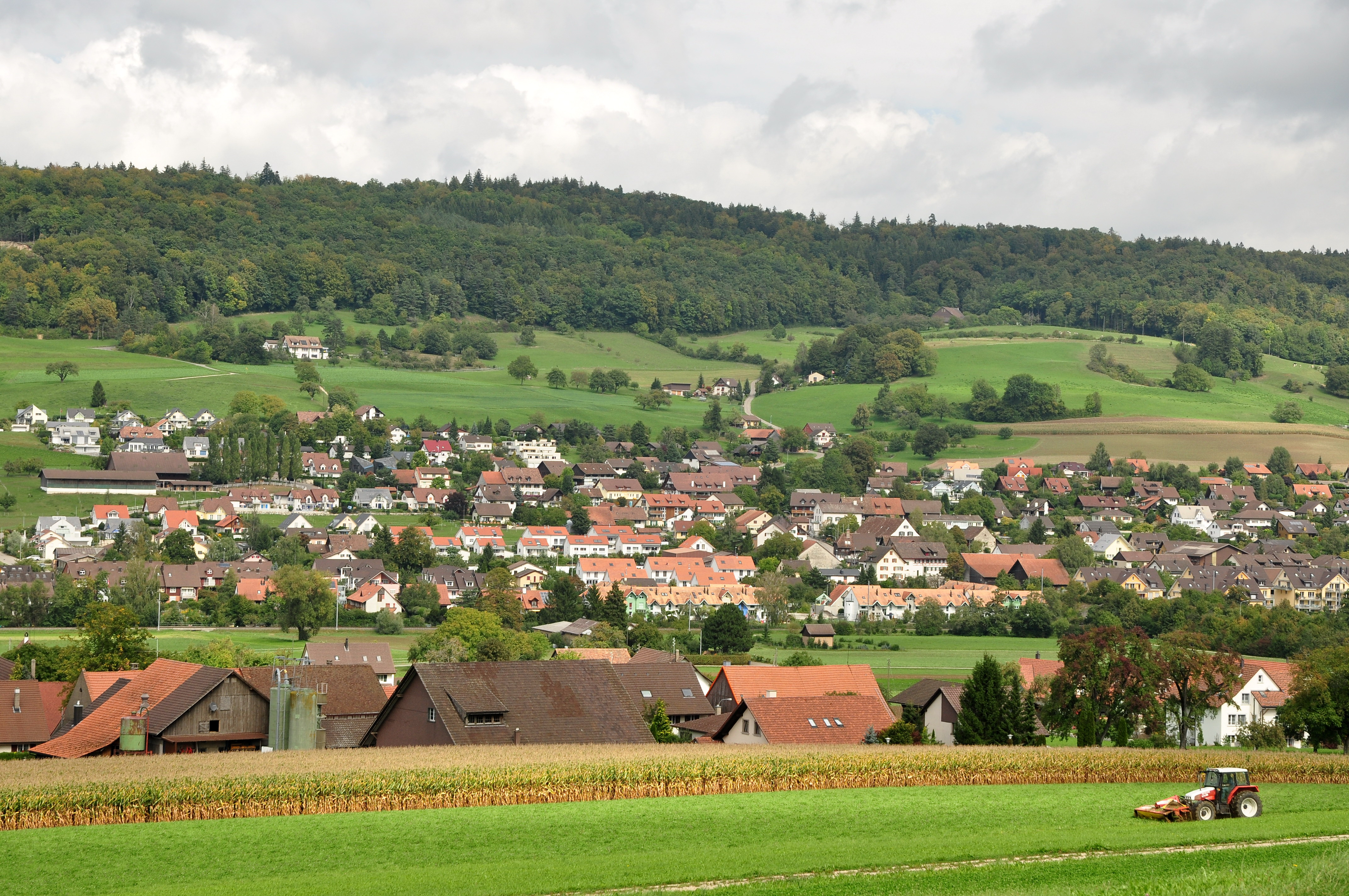

- Flag Coat of arms
- Location of Oberweningen
- Location within Switzerland Location within Canton of Zurich
- Coordinates: 47°30′N 8°24′E
- Country: Switzerland
- Canton: Zurich
- District: Dielsdorf

Area
  - Total: 4.86 km^{2} (1.88 sq mi)
- Elevation: 465 m (1,526 ft)

Population (December 2020)
  - Total: 1,897
  - Density: 390/km^{2} (1,010/sq mi)
- Time zone: UTC+01:00 (CET)
  - Summer (DST): UTC+02:00 (CEST)
- Postal code: 8165
- SFOS number: 93
- ISO 3166 code: CH-ZH
- Surrounded by: Bachs, Fisibach (AG), Regensberg, Schleinikon, Schöfflisdorf, Siglistorf (AG)
- Website: www.oberweningen.ch

Oberweningen is a municipality in the district of Dielsdorf in the canton of Zürich in Switzerland.

== History ==
Oberweningen is first mentioned around 1096-1111 as Waningen. In 1291 it was mentioned as Oberenweningen.

Aerial view (1971)

== Geography ==
Oberweningen has an area of 4.9 km^{2} (1.9 sq mi). Of this area, 35% is used for agricultural purposes, while 55.9% is forested. Of the rest of the land, 8.6% is settled (buildings or roads) and the remainder (0.4%) is non-productive (rivers, glaciers or mountains).

The municipality is made up scattered farm houses and single family homes between the Lägern ridge and the Egg forest (Eggwald) in the Wehntal.

== Demographics ==
Oberweningen has a population (as of 31 December 2020) of 1,897. As of 2007, 15.1% of the population was made up of foreign nationals. Over the last 10 years the population has grown at a rate of 16.6%. Most of the population (as of 2000) speaks German (92.1%), with Italian being second most common ( 1.7%) and Albanian being third ( 1.2%).

In the 2007 election the most popular party was the SVP which received 42% of the vote. The next three most popular parties were the SPS (13.1%), the FDP (12.3%) and the CSP (10.2%).

The age distribution of the population (as of 2000) is children and teenagers (0–19 years old) make up 28.9% of the population, while adults (20–64 years old) make up 63.8% and seniors (over 64 years old) make up 7.3%. In Oberweningen about 81.2% of the population (between age 25-64) have completed either non-mandatory upper secondary education or additional higher education (either university or a Fachhochschule).

Oberweningen has an unemployment rate of 2.35%. As of 2005, there were 41 people employed in the primary economic sector and about 11 businesses involved in this sector. 49 people are employed in the secondary sector and there are 11 businesses in this sector. 115 people are employed in the tertiary sector, with 30 businesses in this sector.

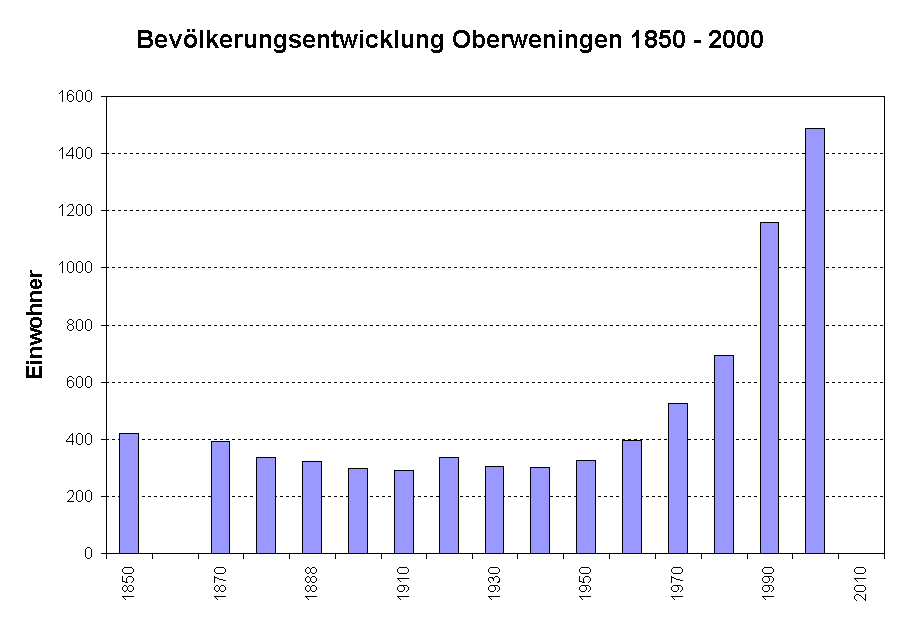
Population 1850-2000

The historical population is given in the following table:

year	population
1634	116
1850	419
1900	297
1950	325
2000	1,290

== Transport ==
Schöfflisdorf-Oberweningen railway station is a stop of the Zürich S-Bahn on the lines S5 and S55. It is a 29 minute ride from Zürich Hauptbahnhof.

== Notable people ==
- Inigo Gallo (1932–2000), actor and playwright
