= Fisibach =

- Municipality
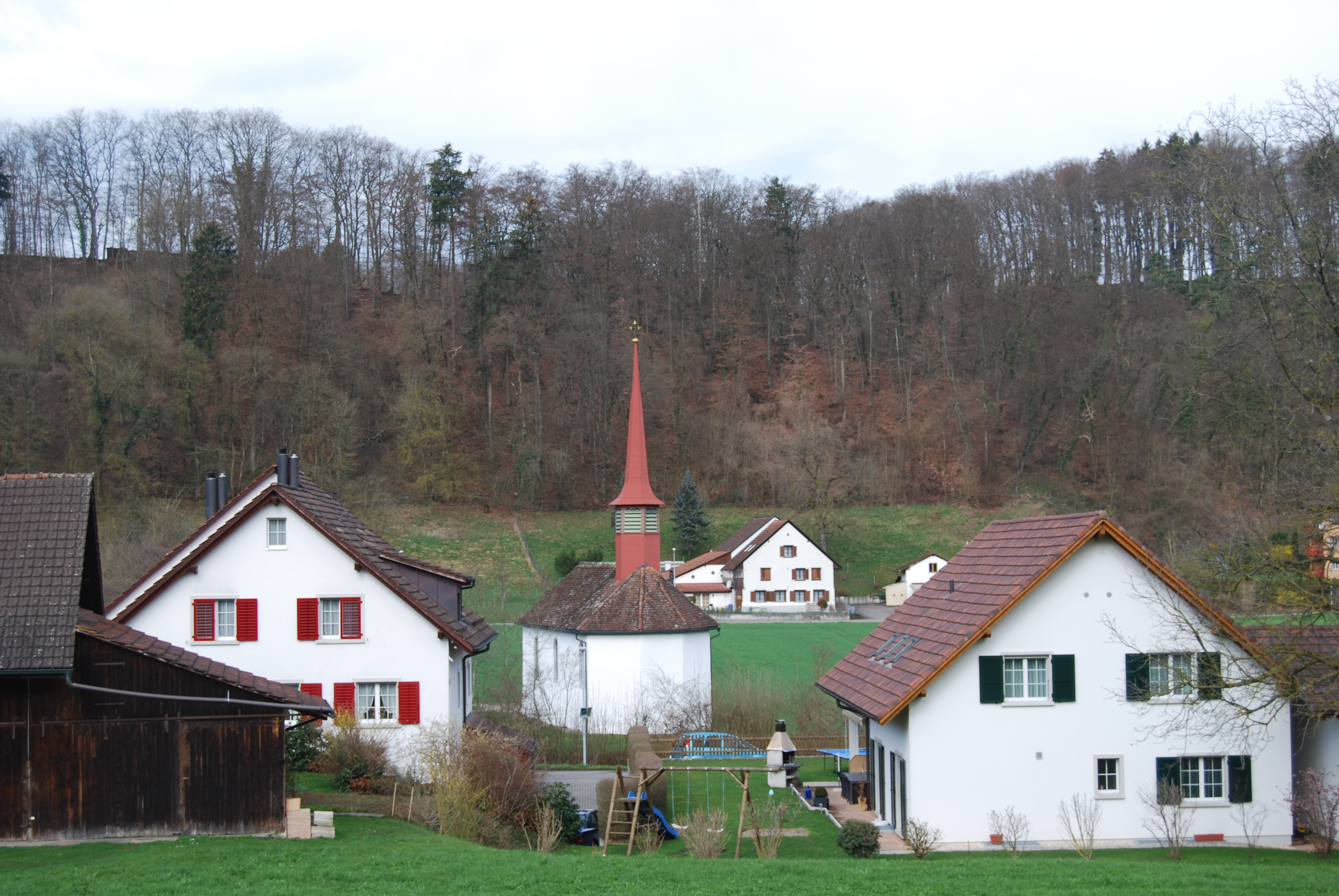

- Flag Coat of arms
- Location of Fisibach
- Location within Switzerland Location within Canton of Aargau
- Coordinates: 47°34′N 8°24′E
- Country: Switzerland
- Canton: Aargau
- District: Zurzach

Area
  - Total: 5.79 km^{2} (2.24 sq mi)
- Elevation: 378 m (1,240 ft)

Population (December 2003)
  - Total: 383
  - Density: 66.1/km^{2} (171/sq mi)
- Time zone: UTC+01:00 (CET)
  - Summer (DST): UTC+02:00 (CEST)
- Postal code: 5467
- SFOS number: 4306
- ISO 3166 code: CH-AG
- Surrounded by: Bachs (ZH), Hohentengen am Hochrhein (DE-BW), Kaiserstuhl, Oberweningen (ZH), Rümikon, Siglistorf, Weiach (ZH), Wislikofen
- Website: www.fisibach.ch

Fisibach is a village and municipality in the district of Zurzach in the canton of Aargau in Switzerland.

== History ==
While some scattered items from the Bronze Age were discovered in Fisibach, the first evidence of a settlement is a Roman era watchtower along the Rhine River. The modern village of Fisibach is first mentioned in 1050 as Fusibach. The owners of Waldhausen Castle in the hamlet of Waldhausen, granted St. Blaise's Abbey extensive landholdings around their castle in 1113. However, by the 15th century, the castle was abandoned. On a rock in the Rhine was the Schwarzwasserstelz Castle. This castle, after 1363, was in the possession of the Bishop of Constance, and from 1589 to 1831 in the hands of the Tschudi family of Glarus. In 1875 it was demolished during the construction of the Rhine Valley Railway. The railroad did not have a station in Fisibach. The owner of Schwarzwasserstelz held the low court rights over Fisibach, while the Vogt of Baden held those rights in Waldhausen and Hägelen.

The residents of Fisibach were part of the Hohentengen parish until 1842, when they became part of the Kaiserstuhl parish. A village chapel was built in the 17th century.

Agriculture dominated the economy until the mid-20th century.

== Geography ==
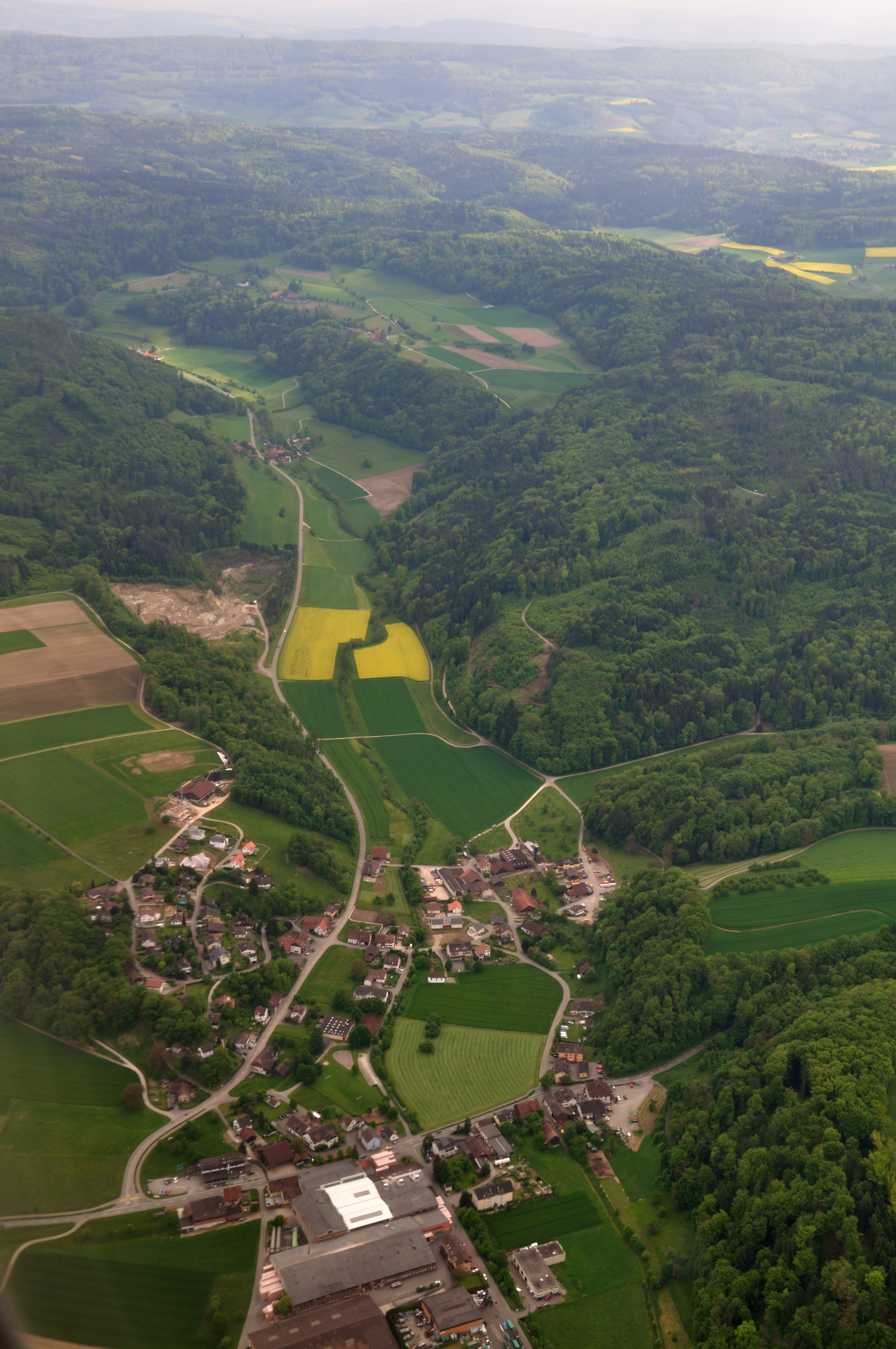
Fisibach from the air

Fisibach has an area, as of 2009, of 5.79 square kilometers (2.24 sq mi). Of this area, 2.5 km^{2} (0.97 sq mi) or 43.2% is used for agricultural purposes, while 2.65 km^{2} (1.02 sq mi) or 45.8% is forested. Of the rest of the land, 0.49 km^{2} (0.19 sq mi) or 8.5% is settled (buildings or roads), 0.13 km^{2} (32 acres) or 2.2% is either rivers or lakes.

Of the built up area, housing and buildings made up 2.1% and transportation infrastructure made up 4.0%. Power and water infrastructure as well as other special developed areas made up 1.4% of the area Out of the forested land, all of the forested land area is covered with heavy forests. Of the agricultural land, 29.9% is used for growing crops and 12.8% is pastures. All the water in the municipality is flowing water.

The village is located in the Zurzach district, at the end of the Fisibach valley. It lies in the northeastern part of Aargau and is neighbored with the Canton of Zürich. The neighboring municipalities are Bachs and Weiach. The place prior to modern times was Visibachs and differed from Obervisibachs (now Bachs in the Canton of Zurich). It consists of the haufendorf village (an irregular, unplanned and quite closely packed village, built around a central square) of Fisibach and the hamlets of Burenmüli, Hägelen and Waldhausen.

== Coat of arms ==
The blazon of the municipal coat of arms is Azure three Wagtails statant Azure beaked and membered Gules on a Bar Or.

== Demographics ==
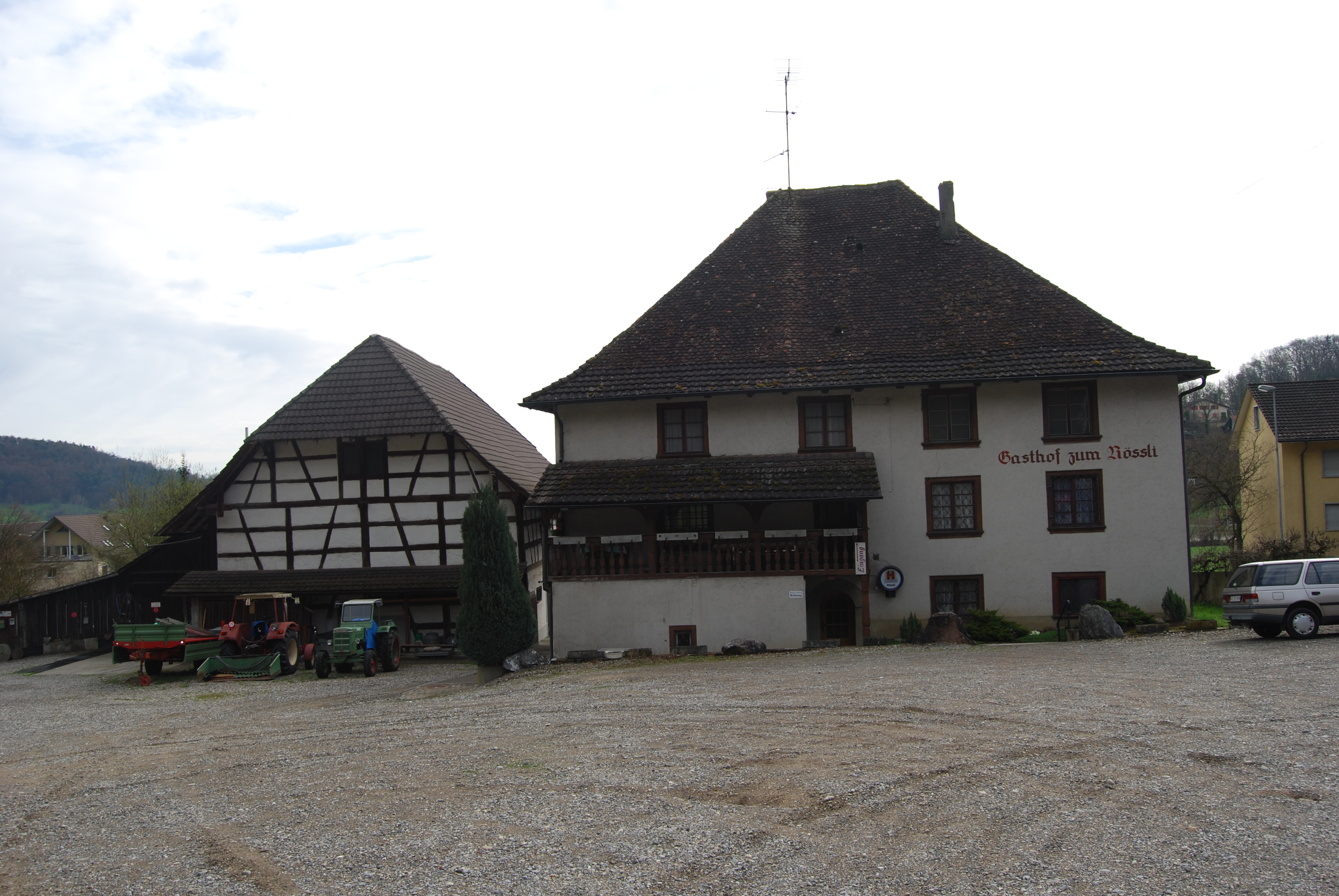
Gasthaus (Restaurant and hotel) near Fisibach

Fisibach has a population (as of December 2020) of 543 As of June 2009, 15.2% of the population are foreign nationals. Over the last 10 years (1997–2007) the population has changed at a rate of 6.3%. Most of the population (as of 2000) speaks German(91.7%), with Italian being second most common ( 1.9%) and French being third ( 1.7%).

The age distribution, as of 2008, in Fisibach is; 39 children or 10.7% of the population are between 0 and 9 years old and 38 teenagers or 10.5% are between 10 and 19. Of the adult population, 45 people or 12.4% of the population are between 20 and 29 years old. 46 people or 12.7% are between 30 and 39, 73 people or 20.1% are between 40 and 49, and 56 people or 15.4% are between 50 and 59. The senior population distribution is 33 people or 9.1% of the population are between 60 and 69 years old, 21 people or 5.8% are between 70 and 79, there are 11 people or 3.0% who are between 80 and 89, and there is 1 person who is 90 or older.

As of 2000 the average number of residents per living room was 0.57 which is about equal to the cantonal average of 0.57 per room. In this case, a room is defined as space of a housing unit of at least 4 m^{2} (43 sq ft) as normal bedrooms, dining rooms, living rooms, kitchens and habitable cellars and attics. About 45.1% of the total households were owner occupied, or in other words did not pay rent (though they may have a mortgage or a rent-to-own agreement).

As of 2000, there were 19 homes with 1 or 2 persons in the household, 63 homes with 3 or 4 persons in the household, and 60 homes with 5 or more persons in the household. As of 2000, there were 144 private households (homes and apartments) in the municipality, and an average of 2.5 persons per household. In 2008 there were 69 single family homes (or 41.1% of the total) out of a total of 168 homes and apartments. There were a total of 7 empty apartments for a 4.2% vacancy rate. As of 2007, the construction rate of new housing units was 0 new units per 1000 residents.

In the 2007 federal election the most popular party was the SVP which received 46.23% of the vote. The next three most popular parties were the CVP (18.49%), the Green Party (14.86%) and the SP (12%). In the federal election, a total of 116 votes were cast, and the voter turnout was 44.3%.

The historical population is given in the following table:

Historical population
Year	Pop.	±%
1799	157	—
1850	404	+157.3%
1900	246	−39.1%
1950	309	+25.6%
1990	372	+20.4%
2000	361	−3.0%

== Heritage sites of national significance ==
The Bleiche, a part of the Roman Rhine fortifications, is listed as a Swiss heritage site of national significance.

== Economy ==
As of 2007, Fisibach had an unemployment rate of 2.09%. As of 2005, there were 30 people employed in the primary economic sector and about 14 businesses involved in this sector. 41 people are employed in the secondary sector and there are 7 businesses in this sector. 78 people are employed in the tertiary sector, with 12 businesses in this sector.

In 2000 there were 206 workers who lived in the municipality. Of these, 146 or about 70.9% of the residents worked outside Fisibach while 31 people commuted into the municipality for work. There were a total of 91 jobs (of at least 6 hours per week) in the municipality. Of the working population, 10.7% used public transportation to get to work, and 50% used a private car.

== Religion ==
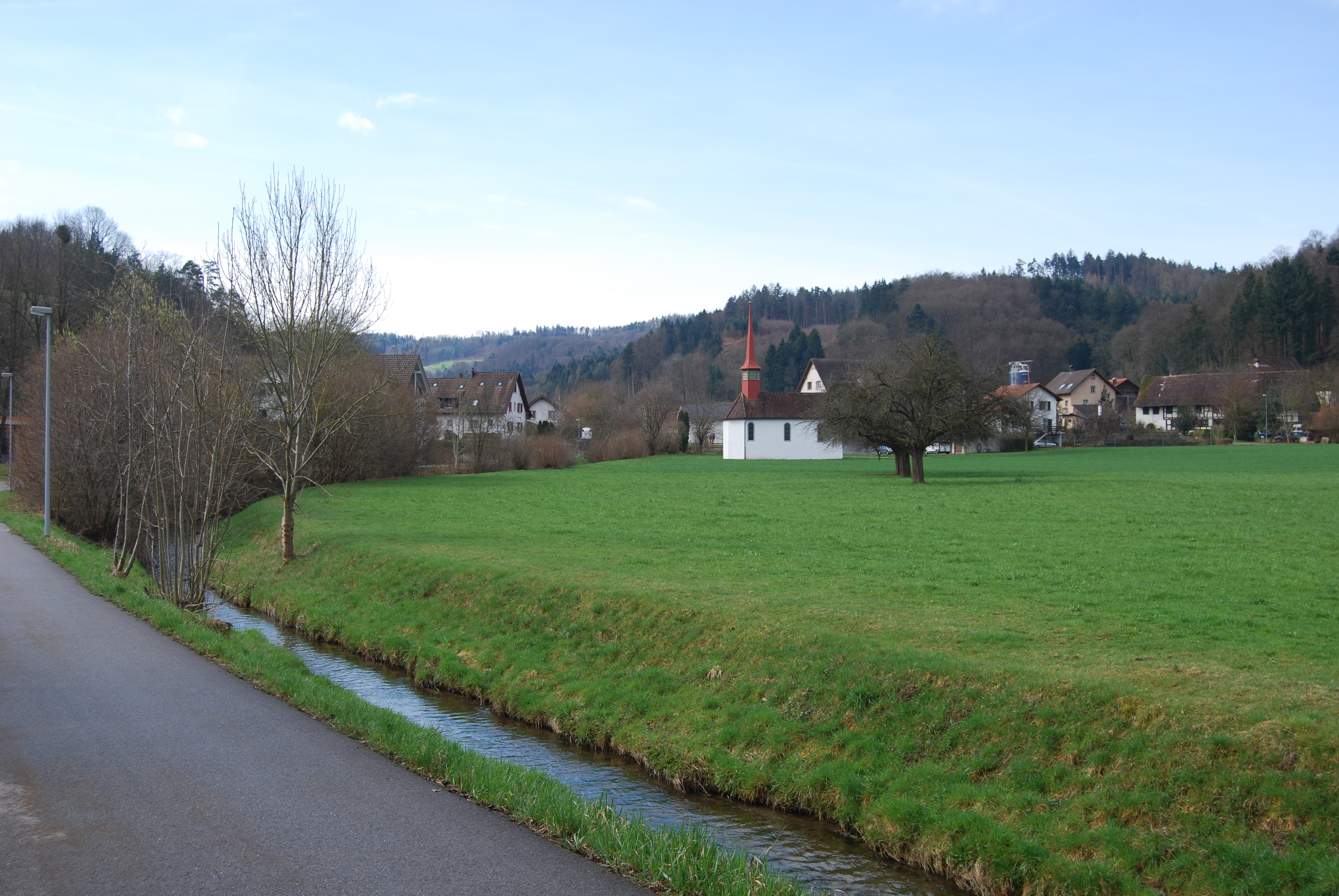
Fisibach church

From the 2000 census, 165 or 45.7% were Roman Catholic, while 140 or 38.8% belonged to the Swiss Reformed Church.

== Education ==
In Fisibach about 74.7% of the population (between age 25-64) have completed either non-mandatory upper secondary education or additional higher education (either university or a Fachhochschule). Of the school age population (in the 2008/2009 school year), there are 62 students attending primary school in the municipality. The municipality has a kindergarten and a primary school. The children of the hamlet of Waldhausen attend school in Bachs in the Canton of Zürich.
