= Schleinikon =

- Municipality
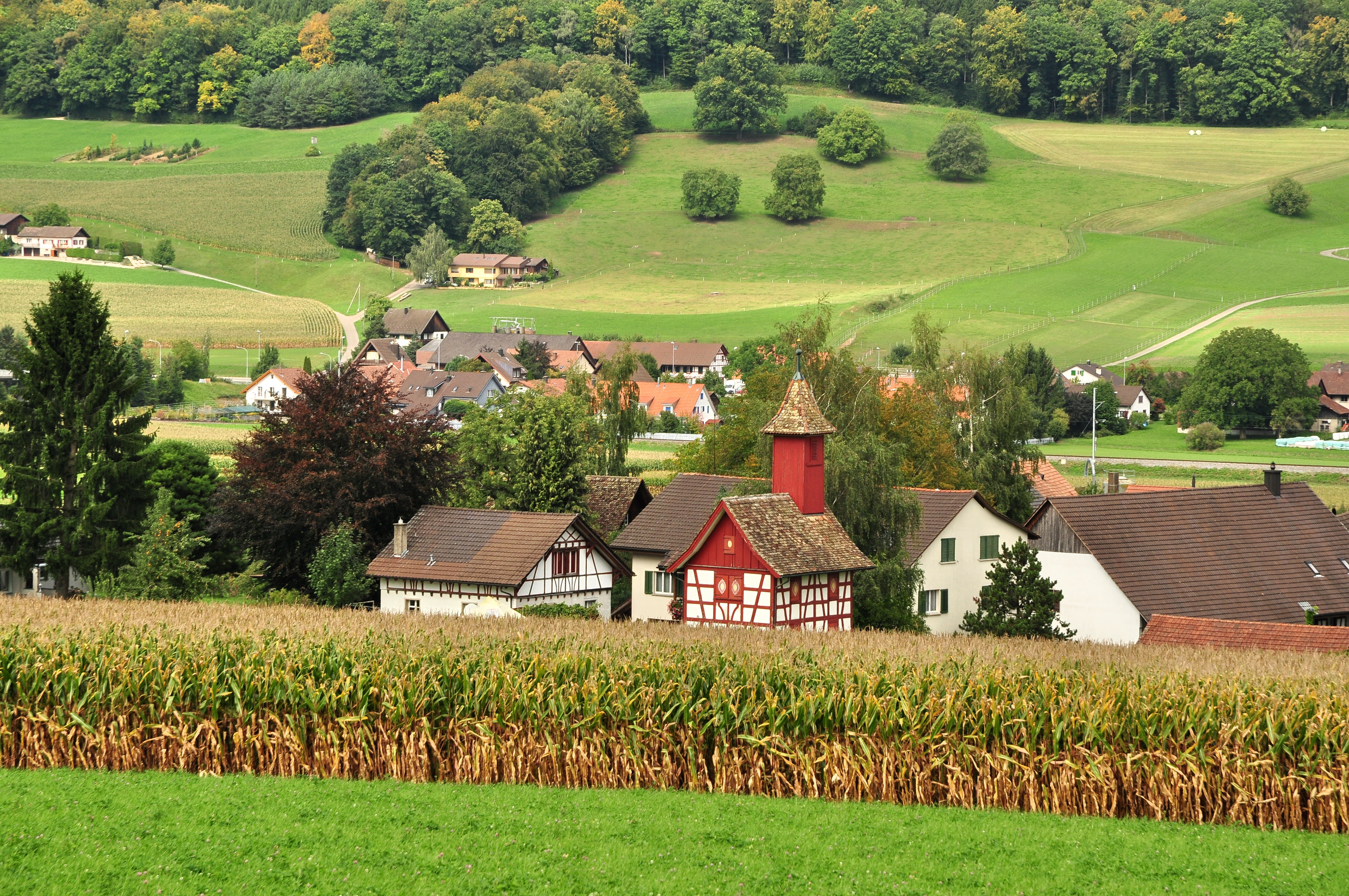

- Flag Coat of arms
- Location of Schleinikon
- Location within Switzerland Location within Canton of Zurich
- Coordinates: 47°30′N 8°24′E
- Country: Switzerland
- Canton: Zurich
- District: Dielsdorf

Area
  - Total: 5.65 km^{2} (2.18 sq mi)
- Elevation: 472 m (1,549 ft)

Population (December 2020)
  - Total: 858
  - Density: 152/km^{2} (393/sq mi)
- Time zone: UTC+01:00 (CET)
  - Summer (DST): UTC+02:00 (CEST)
- Postal code: 8165
- SFOS number: 98
- ISO 3166 code: CH-ZH
- Surrounded by: Boppelsen, Niederweningen, Oberweningen, Otelfingen, Regensberg, Siglistorf (AG)
- Website: http://www.schleinikon.ch SFSO statistics

Schleinikon is a municipality in the district of Dielsdorf in the canton of Zürich in Switzerland.

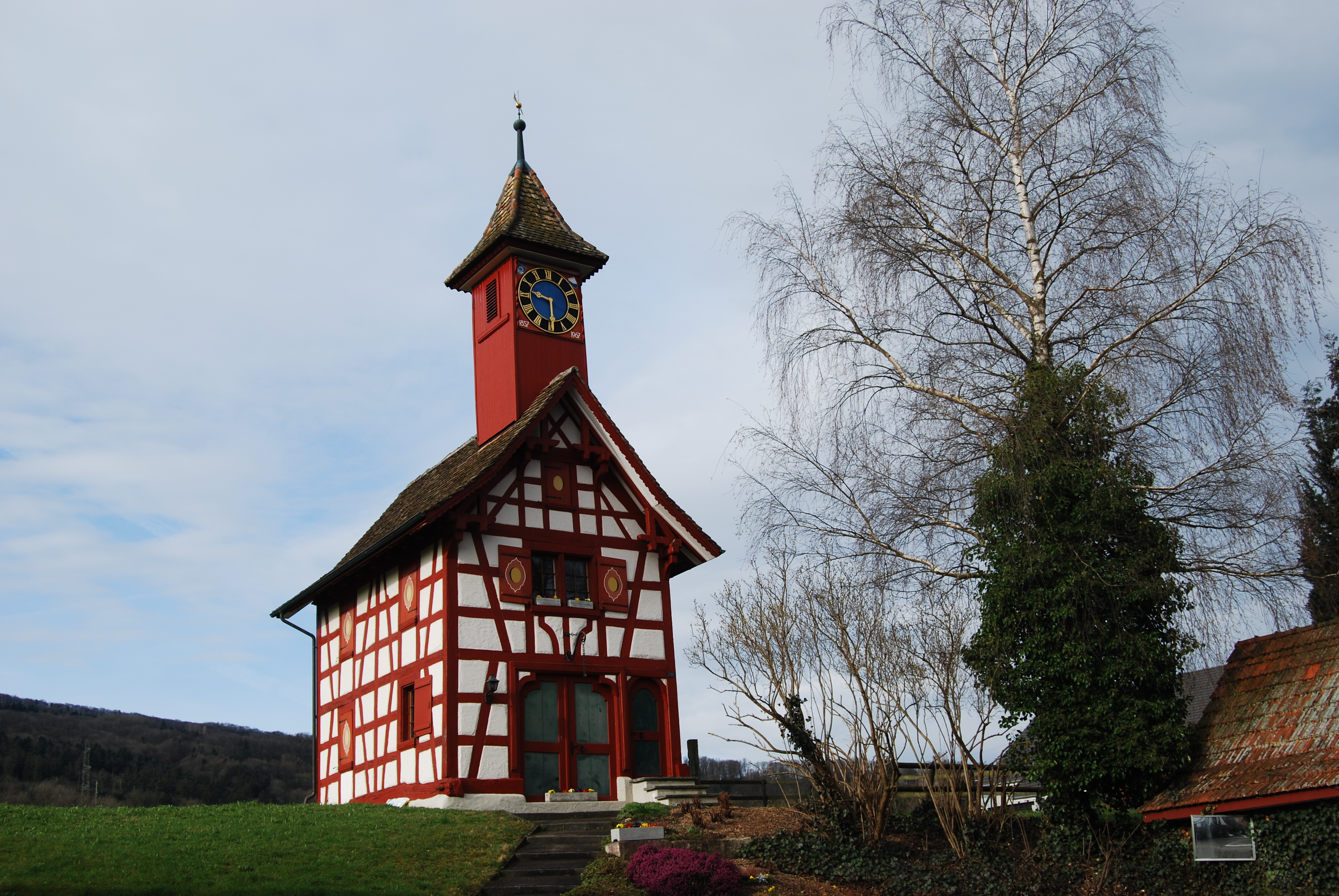
Zythüsli, timber framing construction at Schleinikon

== Geography ==
Aerial view (1967)

Situated in the Wehntal, Schleinikon has an area of 5.7 km^{2} (2.2 sq mi). Of this area, 49.9% is used for agricultural purposes, while 43.2% is forested. Of the rest of the land, 6.7% is settled (buildings or roads) and the remainder (0.2%) is non-productive (rivers, glaciers or mountains).

== Demographics ==
Schleinikon has a population (as of 31 December 2020) of 858. As of 2007, 5.7% of the population was made up of foreign nationals. Over the last 10 years the population has grown at a rate of 9.4%. Most of the population (as of 2000) speaks German (95.8%), with English being second most common ( 0.6%) and Serbo-Croatian being third ( 0.6%).

In the 2007 election the most popular party was the SVP which received 39.8% of the vote. The next three most popular parties were the SPS (18.3%), the CSP (12.9%) and the Green Party (11.4%).

The age distribution of the population (as of 2000) is children and teenagers (0–19 years old) make up 27% of the population, while adults (20–64 years old) make up 63% and seniors (over 64 years old) make up 10%. In Schleinikon about 84% of the population (between age 25-64) have completed either non-mandatory upper secondary education or additional higher education (either university or a Fachhochschule).

Schleinikon has an unemployment rate of 0.92%. As of 2005, there were 45 people employed in the primary economic sector and about 18 businesses involved in this sector. 24 people are employed in the secondary sector and there are 6 businesses in this sector. 34 people are employed in the tertiary sector, with 13 businesses in this sector.
