= Regensdorf =

- Municipality
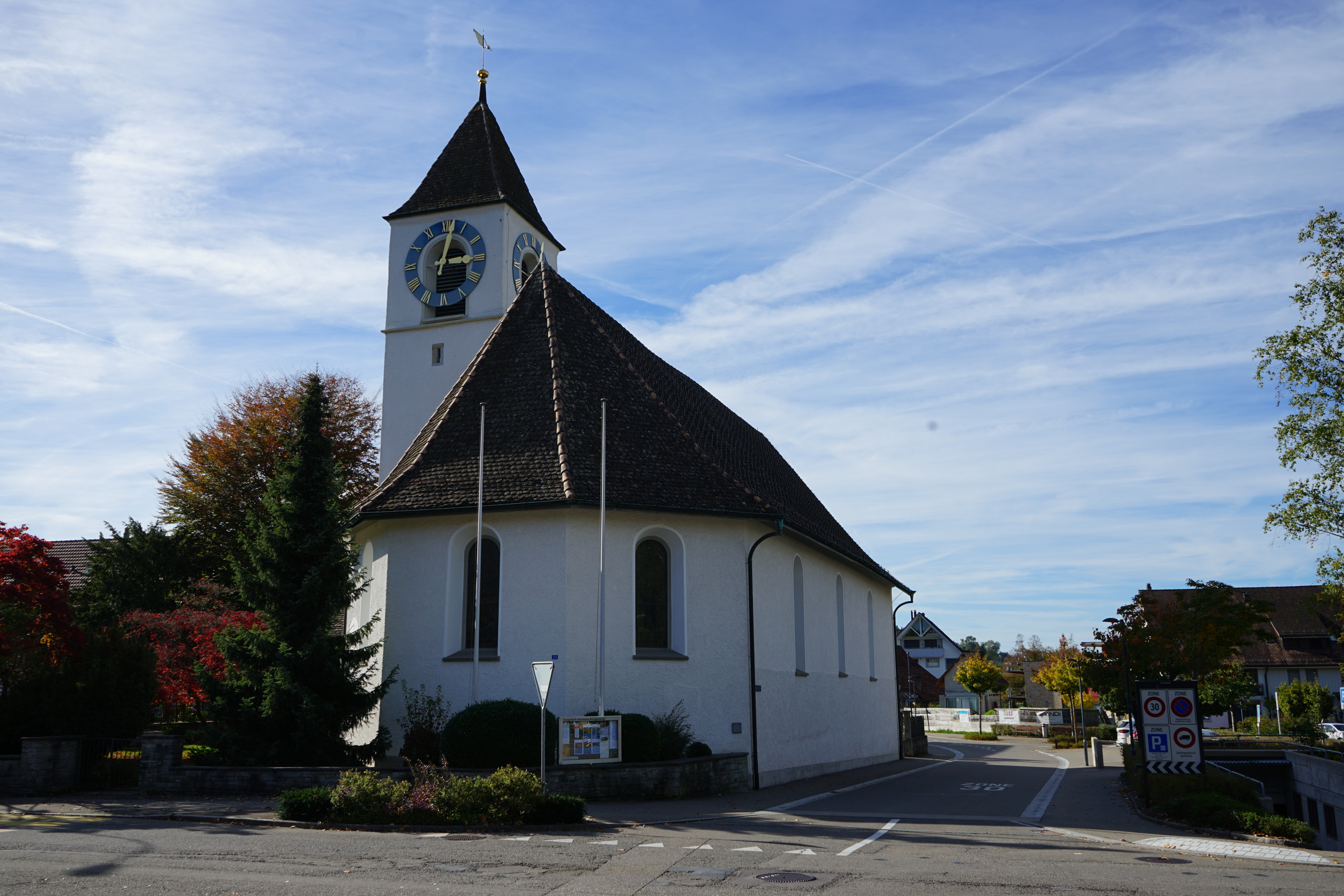
- Regensdorf Reformed Church

- Flag Coat of arms
- Location of Regensdorf
- Location within Switzerland Location within Canton of Zürich
- Coordinates: 47°26′N 8°28′E
- Country: Switzerland
- Canton: Zürich
- District: Dielsdorf

Area
  - Total: 14.62 km^{2} (5.64 sq mi)
- Elevation: 443 m (1,453 ft)

Population (December 2020)
  - Total: 18,568
  - Density: 1,270/km^{2} (3,289/sq mi)
- Time zone: UTC+01:00 (CET)
  - Summer (DST): UTC+02:00 (CEST)
- Postal code: 8105
- SFOS number: 96
- ISO 3166 code: CH-ZH
- Surrounded by: Buchs, Dällikon, Niederhasli, Oberengstringen, Rümlang, Unterengstringen, Weiningen, Zürich
- Website: www.regensdorf.ch

Regensdorf (Swiss Standard German pronunciation: [ˈreːɡn̩sdɔrf]) is a municipality in the Dielsdorf District of the canton of Zürich, Switzerland. It is the largest city in the Furttal region.

Katzensee is a lake that also includes Strandbad Katzensee, a lido on the border with the Affoltern quarter of the city of Zürich.

== History ==
Regensdorf is first mentioned in 870 as Reganesdorf. In 931, it was mentioned as Wat and in 1040 as Adalinchova, probably when Alt-Regensberg Castle was built by the House of Regensberg.

== Geography ==
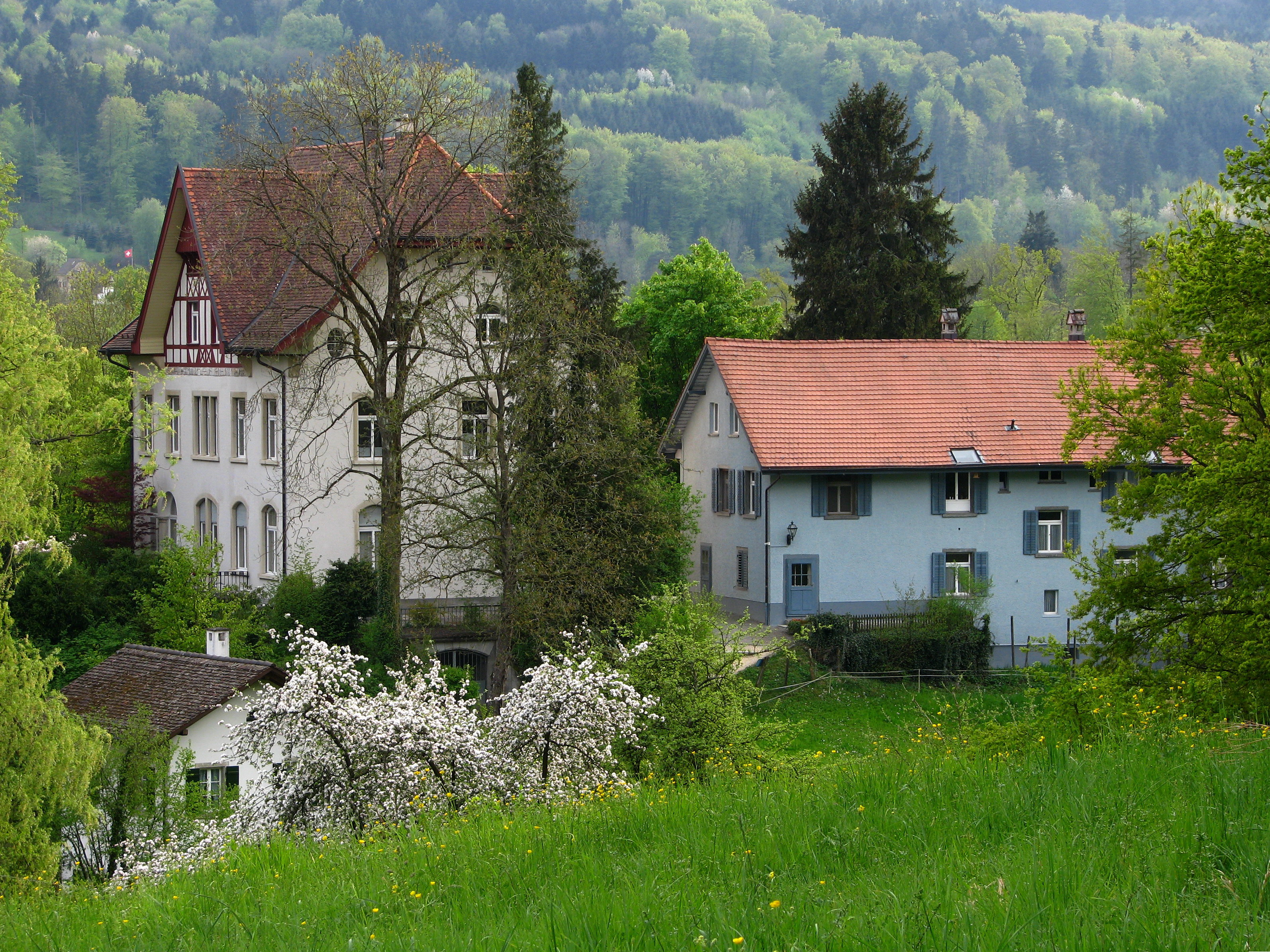
Gut Katzensee, an estate on Lake Katzensee

1923 aerial view by Walter Mittelholzer

Regensdorf has an area of 14.6 km^{2} (5.6 sq mi). Of this area, 43.5% is used for agricultural purposes, while 23.6% is forested. Of the rest of the land, 30.6% is settled (buildings or roads) and the remainder (2.3%) is non-productive (rivers, glaciers or mountains).

The municipality is located on both sides of the Furtbach (Furt stream). It consists of the villages of Watt (which in turn includes the hamlets of Oberdorf, Altburg, Katzensee and Neu-Hard), Adlikon and Regensdorf (which includes the hamlets of Alt-Hard and Geissberg).

Regensdorf sits in a plain, at an elevation of 443 metres (1,453 ft). The shallow east–west Furt valley in which it sits is surrounded by several hills. To the north is Regensberg (617 m (2,024 ft)), on which stands Regensberg Castle. To the northwest, beyond Buchs, is Lägern (866 metres (2,841 ft)). To the south is Gubrist (615 metres (2,018 ft)), through which passes the A1 motorway via the Gubrist Tunnel. To the southwest is Altberg (632 metres (2,073 ft)), on the summit of which stands Waldschenke Altberg.

== Demographics ==
Regensdorf has a population (as of 31 December 2020) of 18,568. As of 2007, 31.4% of the population was made up of foreign nationals. In the early 2000s, the population grew at a rate of 16.5%. Most of the population (as of 2000) speaks German (77.8%), with Italian being second most common (5.6%) and Albanian being third (3.9%).

In the 2007 election the most popular party was the SVP which received 48.2% of the vote. The next three most popular parties were the SPS (16.5%), the FDP (9.5%) and the CVP (8.7%).

The age distribution of the population (as of 2000) is children and teenagers (0–19 years old) make up 21.7% of the population, while adults (20–64 years old) make up 67.7% and seniors (over 64 years old) make up 10.6%. In Regensdorf about 65.6% of the population (between age 25–64) have completed either non-mandatory upper secondary education or additional higher education (either university or a Fachhochschule).

Regensdorf has an unemployment rate of 3.39%. As of 2005, there were 97 people employed in the primary economic sector and about 30 businesses involved in this sector. 2,418 people are employed in the secondary sector and there are 163 businesses in this sector. 6,321 people are employed in the tertiary sector, with 626 businesses in this sector.

The historical population is given in the following table:

year	population
1468	97 (23 households)
1634	553
1850	1,201
1880	1,020
1950	2,093
1970	8,566
2000	14,628

== Transportation ==
=== S-Bahn ===
The Regensdorf-Watt railway station is a stop of the Zürich S-Bahn and is served half-hourly by the S6 service—connecting Regensdorf to Baden AG as well as Zürich HB and Uetikon am See. Furthermore S21 connects Regensdorf with Zürich HB during weekday peak hours, while SN6 runs from Winterthur to Würenlos via Zürich HB and Regensdorf on Friday and Saturday nights.

=== Bus ===
Regensdorf is served by bus lines 451 (Regensdorf Zentrum to Adlikon), 452 (Regensdorf Zentrum to Regensdorf Moosächer), 453 (Regensdorf Watt to Adlikon), 454 (Regensdorf Allmend to Regensdorf Watt), 456 (Dielsdorf to Regensdorf Watt), 485 (Zürich Altstetten to Buchs) and 491 (Hüttikon to Zürich Zehntenhausplatz).

== Sport ==
FC Regensdorf, an amateur football club formed in 1937, play at the Sportanlage Wisacher on Wiesackerstrasse. As of the 2025–26 season, they are in the first section of 2. Liga, the sixth tier of football in Switzerland.

== Notable people ==
- John Gossweiler (1873–1952), state botanist to the Government of Angola from 1899 to 1952
- Heinz Stettler (1952–2006), bobsledder, bronze medallist at the 1984 Winter Olympics
