= Furttal =

Coordinates: 47.46°N 8.42°E

Furttal is a valley region in Switzerland between Lägern and Altberg in the Dielsdorf district of the canton of Zurich.

The area's name stems from the German word for ford, or furt, and is named after the crossing over the Limmat in the community of Würenlos on the west side of the region. The area is bordered in the east near the community of Regensdorf by the Katzensee lakes.

The population of the region is expanding rapidly due to its proximity to city of Zurich and its beautiful landscape.

Furttal consists of the area of the municipalities:

- Buchs
- Dällikon
- Dänikon
- Hüttikon
- Otelfingen
- Boppelsen
- Regensdorf (including Watt and Adlikon)

The old part of Würenlos (including Oetlikon) in the Canton of Aargau is also considered part of the region

== Transportation ==
The Furttal is part of the S-Bahn Zürich on the line S6 (Baden –) Otelfingen – Regensdorf – Zürich HB – Uetikon, and their interconnection to the services of the Swiss Federal Railways (SBB-CFF-FFS), and around the city of Zürich provided by Verkehrsbetriebe Zürich (VBZ), the public transport operator in the city of Zurich and its suburbs. In September 2014 a study was published for the construction of a new rail tunnel and underground station serving the ETH Hönggerberg "Science City". The new tunnel would run directly between Hardbrücke and Regensdorf stations, as opposed to the indirect route via the existing Käferberg Tunnel and Oerlikon station that is currently used by service S6.
