= Dällikon =

- Municipality
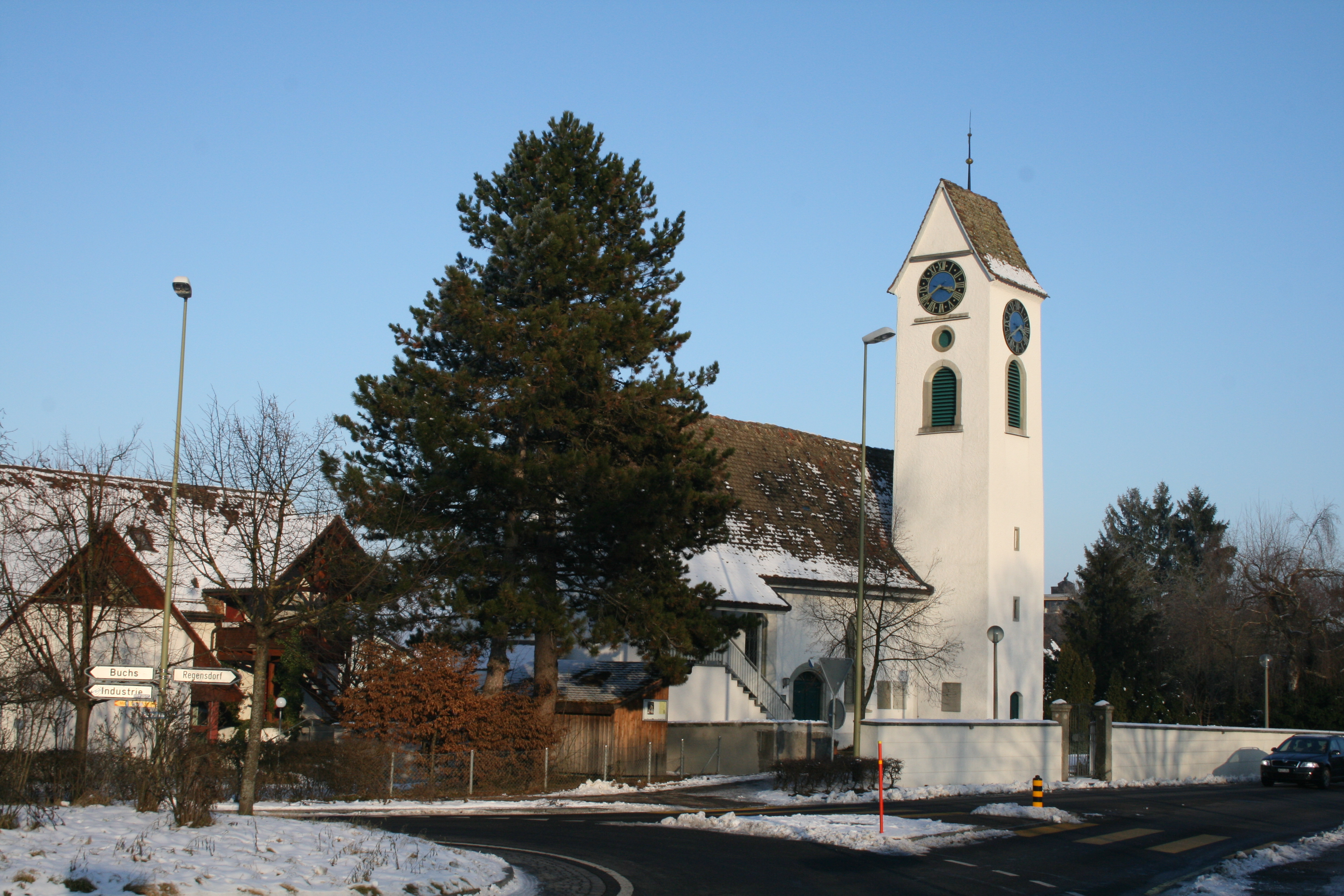

- Flag Coat of arms
- Location of Dällikon
- Location within Switzerland Location within Canton of Zurich
- Coordinates: 47°26′N 8°26′E
- Country: Switzerland
- Canton: Zurich
- District: Dielsdorf

Area
  - Total: 4.49 km^{2} (1.73 sq mi)
- Elevation: 440 m (1,440 ft)

Population (December 2020)
  - Total: 4,278
  - Density: 953/km^{2} (2,470/sq mi)
- Time zone: UTC+01:00 (CET)
  - Summer (DST): UTC+02:00 (CEST)
- Postal code: 8108
- SFOS number: 84
- ISO 3166 code: CH-ZH
- Surrounded by: Buchs, Dänikon, Oetwil an der Limmat, Regensdorf, Weiningen
- Website: www.daellikon.ch

Dällikon is a municipality in the district of Dielsdorf in the canton of Zurich, Switzerland.

== History ==
Aerial view from 300 m by Walter Mittelholzer (1923)

Dällikon is first mentioned in 870 as Tellinghovon. In 1843, the village of Dänikon seceded to become an independent municipality.

== Geography ==
Dällikon has an area of 4.5 km^{2} (1.7 sq mi). Of this area, 45% is used for agricultural purposes, while 32.4% is forested. Of the rest of the land, 22.1% is settled (buildings or roads) and the remainder (0.4%) is non-productive (rivers, glaciers or mountains).

The municipality is located in the Furttal on the northern flank of the Altberg.

== Demographics ==
Dällikon has a population (as of 31 December 2020) of 4,278. As of 2007, 24.4% of the population was made up of foreign nationals. Over the last 10 years the population has grown at a rate of 17.6%. Most of the population (as of 2000) speaks German (83.7%), with Italian being second most common ( 4.0%) and Turkish being third ( 2.7%).

In the 2007 election the most popular party was the SVP which received 50.4% of the vote. The next three most popular parties were the CSP (12.1%), the SPS (12%) and the FDP (9%).

The age distribution of the population (as of 2000) is children and teenagers (0–19 years old) make up 22.9% of the population, while adults (20–64 years old) make up 70% and seniors (over 64 years old) make up 7.1%. The entire Swiss population is generally well educated. In Dällikon about 72.9% of the population (between age 25–64) have completed either non-mandatory upper secondary education or additional higher education (either University or a Fachhochschule).

Dällikon has an unemployment rate of 3.12%. As of 2005, there were 45 people employed in the primary economic sector and about 13 businesses involved in this sector. 1220 people are employed in the secondary sector and there are 74 businesses in this sector. 1156 people are employed in the tertiary sector, with 135 businesses in this sector.

The historical population is given in the following table:

year	population
1467	12 Households
1634	193
1836	360
1850	364
1900	340
1950	377
1980	2,426
2000	3,261

== Transportation ==
Buchs-Dällikon railway station is a stop of the S-Bahn Zürich on the line S6. Additionally, bus lines 491 and 449 run through Dällikon.
