= Däniken (disambiguation) =

Däniken can mean:

- Erich von Däniken (1935–2026), Swiss author
- Däniken, Solothurn, a municipality of Switzerland

== See also ==
- Dänikon, a municipality of the canton of Zürich, Switzerland
