= Buchs, Zürich =

Buchs
- Municipality
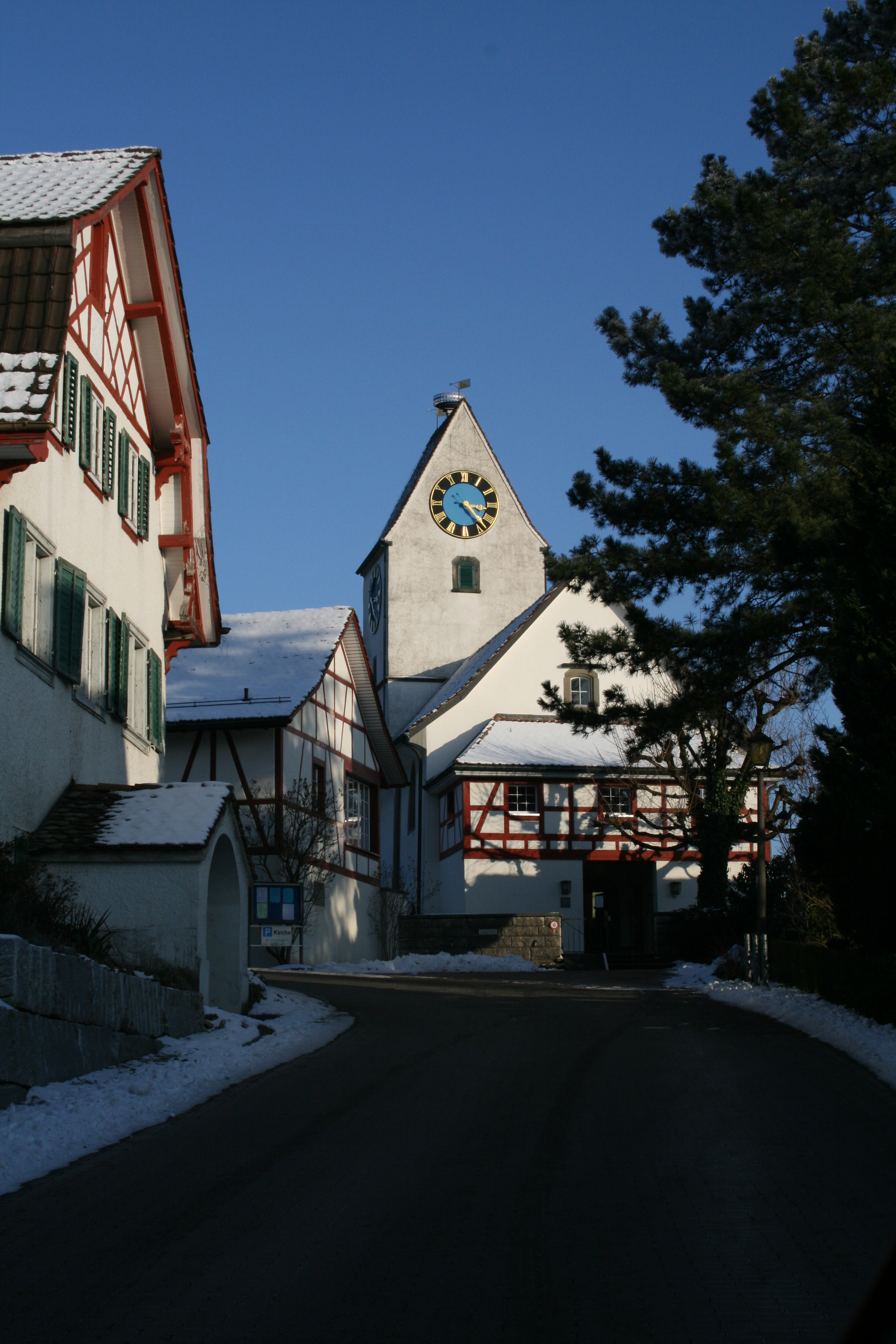
- Swiss Reformed church

- Flag Coat of arms
- Location of Buchs
- Location within Switzerland Location within Canton of Zürich
- Coordinates: 47°28′N 8°26′E
- Country: Switzerland
- Canton: Zürich
- District: Dielsdorf

Area
  - Total: 5.87 km^{2} (2.27 sq mi)
- Elevation: 442 m (1,450 ft)

Population (December 2020)
  - Total: 6,555
  - Density: 1,120/km^{2} (2,890/sq mi)
- Time zone: UTC+01:00 (CET)
  - Summer (DST): UTC+02:00 (CEST)
- Postal code: 8107
- SFOS number: 83
- ISO 3166 code: CH-ZH
- Surrounded by: Boppelsen, Dällikon, Dänikon, Dielsdorf, Niederhasli, Otelfingen, Regensberg, Regensdorf
- Website: www.buchs-zh.ch

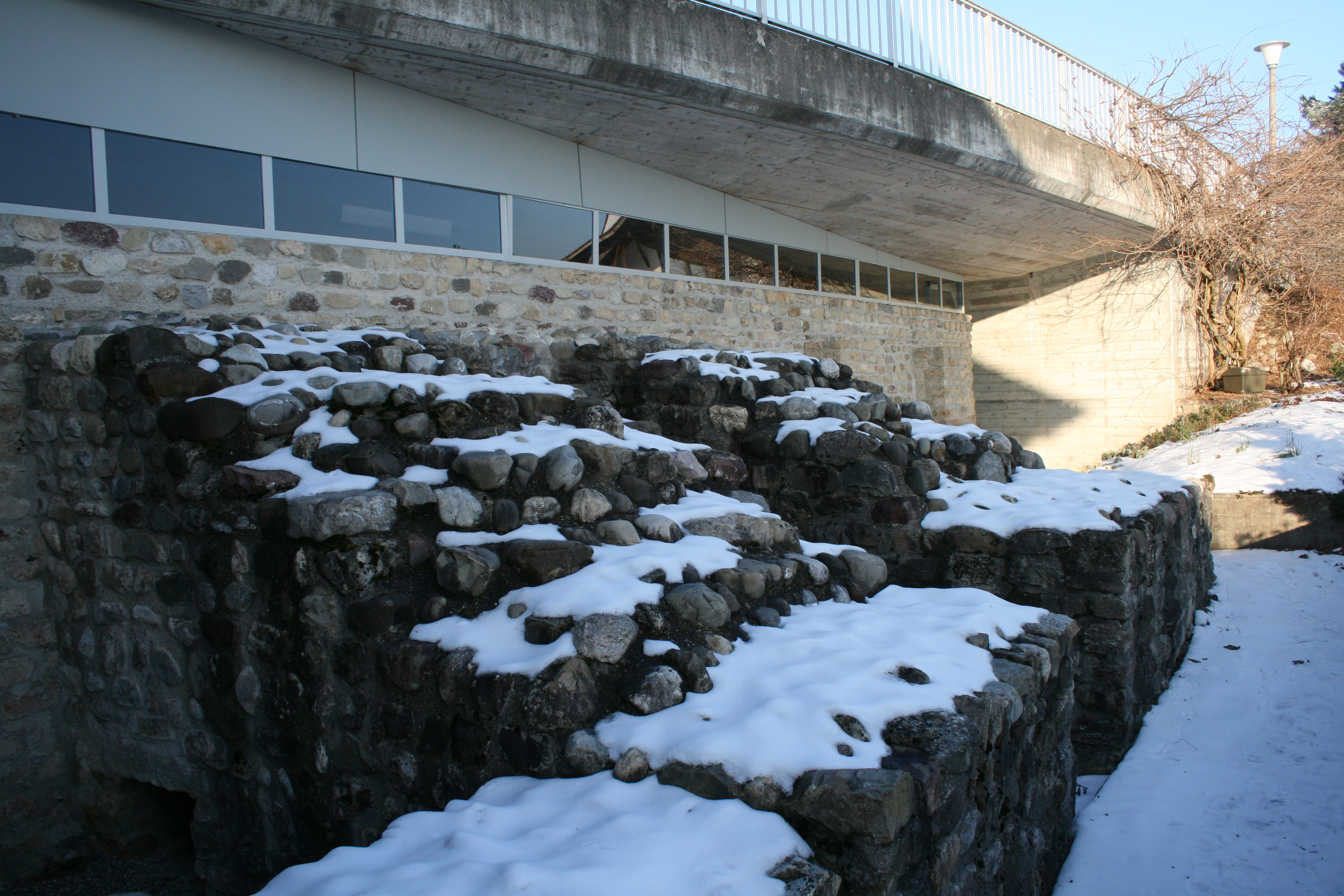
Kryptoportikus

Buchs (German pronunciation: [bʊks]) is a municipality in the district of Dielsdorf in the canton of Zurich, Switzerland.

== History ==
Aerial view by Walter Mittelholzer (1922)

Buchs is first mentioned in 870 as Pusaha. In 1219, it was mentioned as Buhsa.

== Geography ==
Buchs has an area of 5.9 km^{2} (2.3 sq mi). Of this area, 50.3% is used for agricultural purposes, while 26.9% is forested. Of the rest of the land, 21.8% is settled (buildings or roads) and the remainder (1%) is non-productive (rivers, glaciers or mountains).

The municipality is located in the Furttal on the southern flank of the Lägern ridge.

== Demographics ==
Buchs has a population (as of 31 December 2020) of 6,555. As of 2007, 19.0% of the population was made up of foreign nationals. Over the last 10 years the population has grown at a rate of 27.3%. Most of the population (as of 2000) speaks German (88.6%), with Italian being second most common ( 2.7%) and Albanian being third ( 1.7%).

In the 2007 election the most popular party was the SVP which received 46.6% of the vote. The next three most popular parties were the SPS (14.2%), the FDP (12.4%) and the CSP (9.8%).

The age distribution of the population (as of 2000) is children and teenagers (0–19 years old) make up 26.2% of the population, while adults (20–64 years old) make up 66.9% and seniors (over 64 years old) make up 7%. The entire Swiss population is generally well educated. In Buchs about 80.9% of the population (between age 25-64) have completed either non-mandatory upper secondary education or additional higher education (either university or a Fachhochschule).

Buchs has an unemployment rate of 3.11%. As of 2005, there were 221 people employed in the primary economic sector and about 24 businesses involved in this sector. 302 people are employed in the secondary sector and there are 37 businesses in this sector. 1111 people are employed in the tertiary sector, with 112 businesses in this sector. The historical population is given in the following table:

| year | population |
|---|---|
| 1467 | 16 Households |
| 1634 | 326 |
| 1850 | 649 |
| 1900 | 501 |
| 1950 | 627 |
| 1970 | 1,552 |
| 1990 | 3,516 |
| 2000 | 4,182 |

== Transportation ==
Buchs-Dällikon railway station is a stop of the Zürich S-Bahn line S6 on the Wettingen-Effretikon railway line.

Until 1937, Buchs used to have a second railway station, located on the now closed Bülach-Baden railway line. The station building of the former Buchs ZH railway station is still present in the upper part of the village, but the tracks were removed in 1969.
