= Regensdorf Reformed Church =

Church in Regensdord, Switzerland

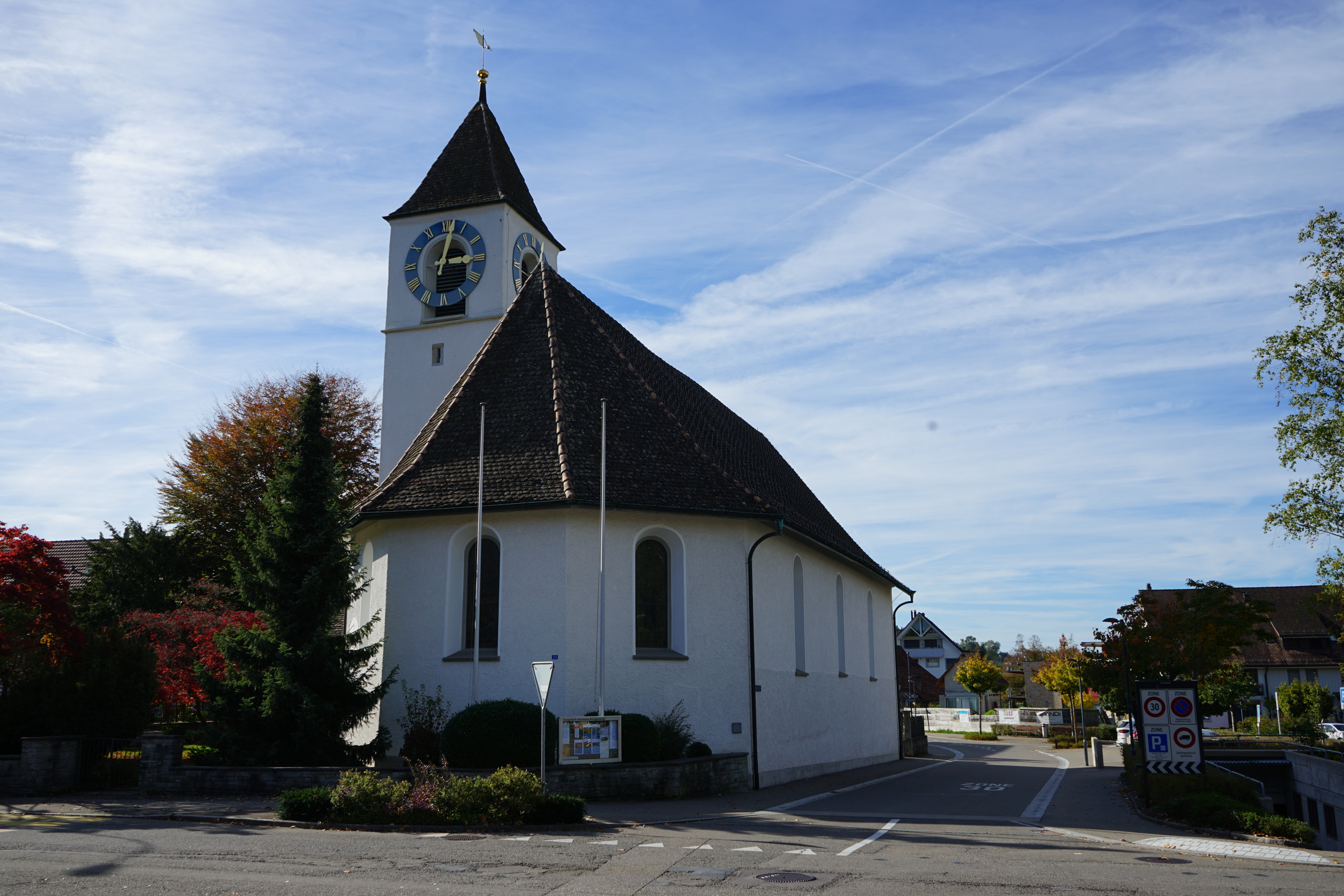
- Looking west across Watterstrasse

Religion
- Affiliation: Reformed
- District: Evangelical Reformed Church of the Canton of Zürich

Location
- Location: Regensdorf; Switzerland
- Interactive map of Regensdorf Reformed Church
- Coordinates: 47.430776°N 8.465636°E

Architecture
- Type: Church
- Completed: 1705 (321 years ago)

Regensdorf Reformed Church stands on Watterstrasse in Regensdorf, Switzerland. It was completed in 1705.
