= Otelfingen =

- Municipality
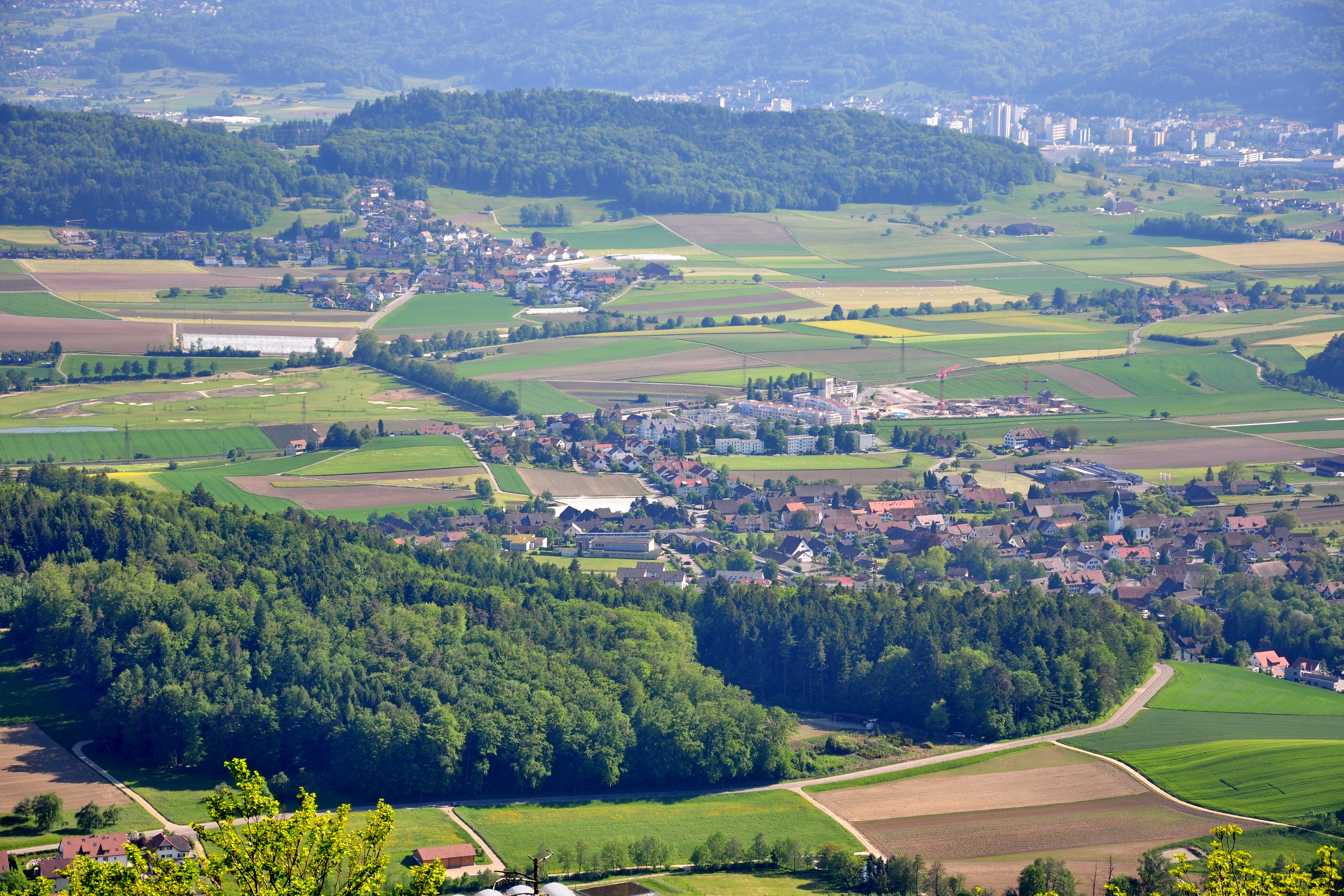

- Flag Coat of arms
- Location of Otelfingen
- Location within Switzerland Location within Canton of Zurich
- Coordinates: 47°28′N 8°23′E
- Country: Switzerland
- Canton: Zurich
- District: Dielsdorf

Area
  - Total: 7.23 km^{2} (2.79 sq mi)
- Elevation: 440 m (1,440 ft)

Population (December 2020)
  - Total: 2,943
  - Density: 407/km^{2} (1,050/sq mi)
- Time zone: UTC+01:00 (CET)
  - Summer (DST): UTC+02:00 (CEST)
- Postal code: 8112
- SFOS number: 94
- ISO 3166 code: CH-ZH
- Surrounded by: Boppelsen, Buchs, Dänikon, Hüttikon, Niederweningen, Schleinikon, Wettingen (AG), Würenlos (AG)
- Website: www.otelfingen.ch

Otelfingen is a municipality in the district of Dielsdorf in the canton of Zürich in Switzerland. The centre of the village, with its typical timber-framed houses, is listed in the Federal Inventory of Swiss Sites of National Importance (ISOS)

== History ==
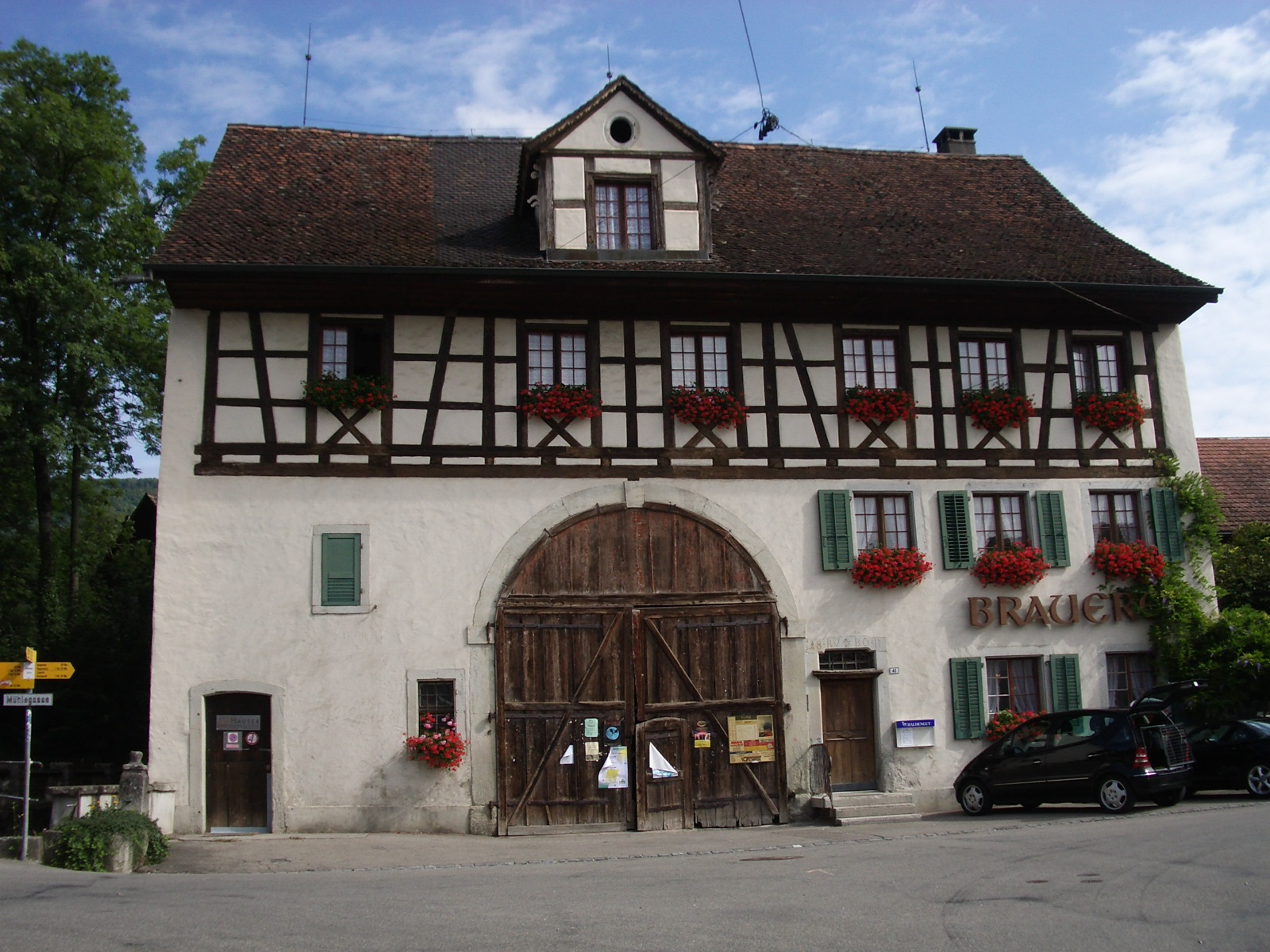

Otelfingen is first mentioned in 1044 as Otilingun though there is some debate about this identification. In 1079 it was mentioned as Notkerus de Otelfingen.

== Geography ==
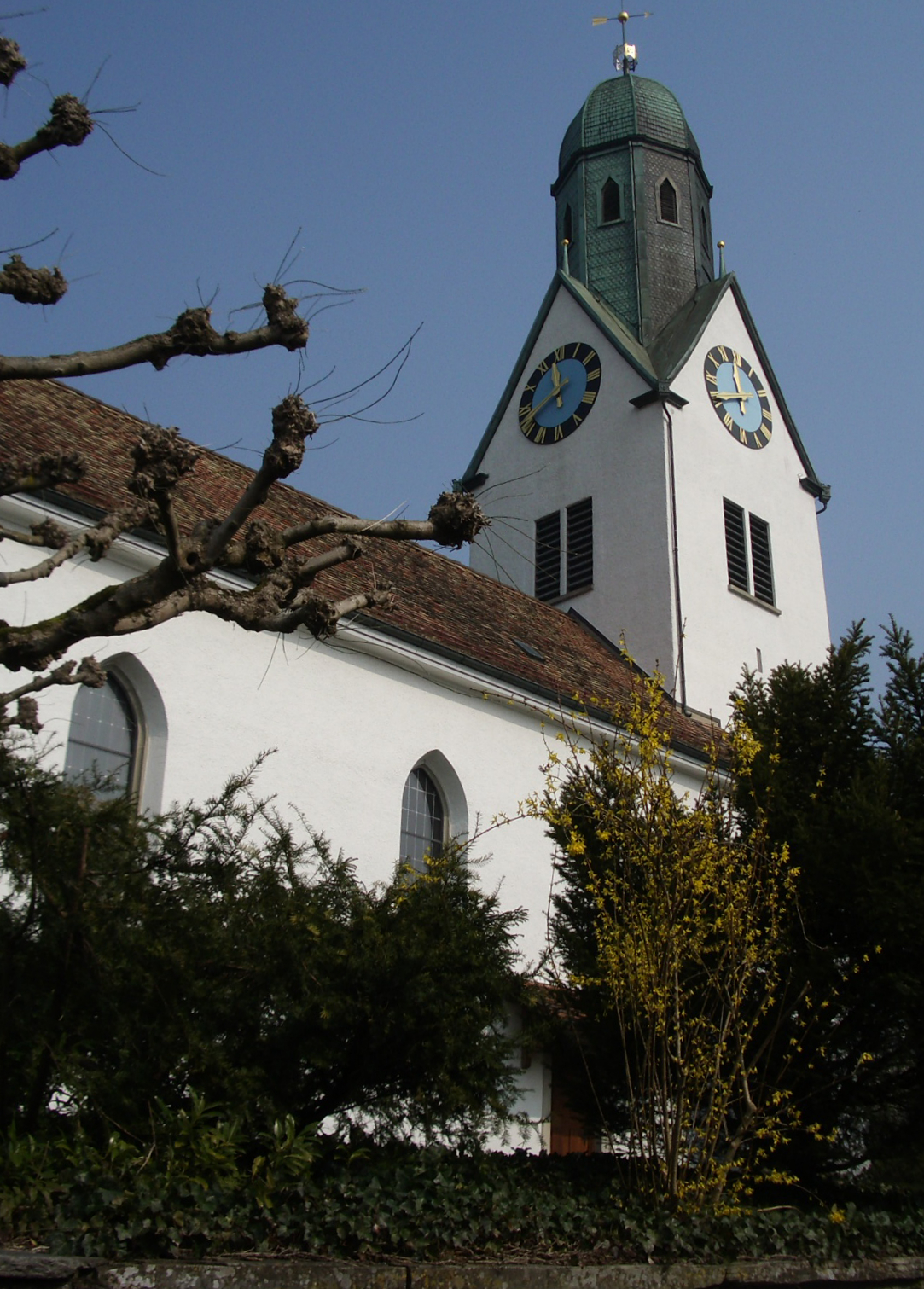
Protestant church

Otelfingen has an area of 7.2 km^{2} (2.8 sq mi). Of this area, 47.1% is used for agricultural purposes, while 37.1% is forested. Of the rest of the land, 14.8% is settled (buildings or roads) and the remainder (1%) is non-productive (rivers, glaciers or mountains).

The majority of the municipality is the village of Otelfingen, a Haufendorf (an irregular, unplanned and quite closely packed village, built around a central square) located in the Furttal on the border with the Canton of Aargau.

Aerial view from 400 m by Walter Mittelholzer (1919)

== Demographics ==
Otelfingen has a population (as of 31 December 2020) of 2,943. As of 2007, 16.2% of the population was made up of foreign nationals. Over the last 10 years the population has grown at a rate of 33.6%. Most of the population (as of 2000) speaks German (91.7%), with Italian being second most common ( 3.0%) and French being third ( 1.1%).

In the 2007 election the most popular party was the SVP which received 41.9% of the vote. The next three most popular parties were the SPS (15.9%), the FDP (12.6%) and the CSP (10.8%).

The age distribution of the population (as of 2000) is children and teenagers (0–19 years old) make up 24.6% of the population, while adults (20–64 years old) make up 65.4% and seniors (over 64 years old) make up 10%. In Otelfingen about 80.7% of the population (between age 25-64) have completed either non-mandatory upper secondary education or additional higher education (either university or a Fachhochschule).

Otelfingen has an unemployment rate of 2.51%. As of 2005, there were 61 people employed in the primary economic sector and about 17 businesses involved in this sector. 381 people are employed in the secondary sector and there are 44 businesses in this sector. 1677 people are employed in the tertiary sector, with 103 businesses in this sector.

Historical population

Year	Pop.	±% p.a.
1634	256	—
1701	301	+0.24%
1799	344	+0.14%
1850	575	+1.01%

Year	Pop.	±% p.a.
1900	481	−0.36%
1950	662	+0.64%
2000	1,852	+2.08%

== Weather ==
Otelfingen has an average of 132.5 days of rain per year and on average receives 1,091 mm (43.0 in) of precipitation. The wettest month is June during which time Otelfingen receives an average of 116 mm (4.6 in) of precipitation. During the wettest month, there is precipitation for an average of 12.7 days. The driest month of the year is October, during which time the municipality receives an average of 72 mm (2.8 in). There are only 8.2 days of precipitation during this month.

== Transportation ==
Otelfingen railway station and Otelfingen Golfpark railway station are stops of the S-Bahn Zürich on the line S6.
