= Hüttikon =

- Municipality
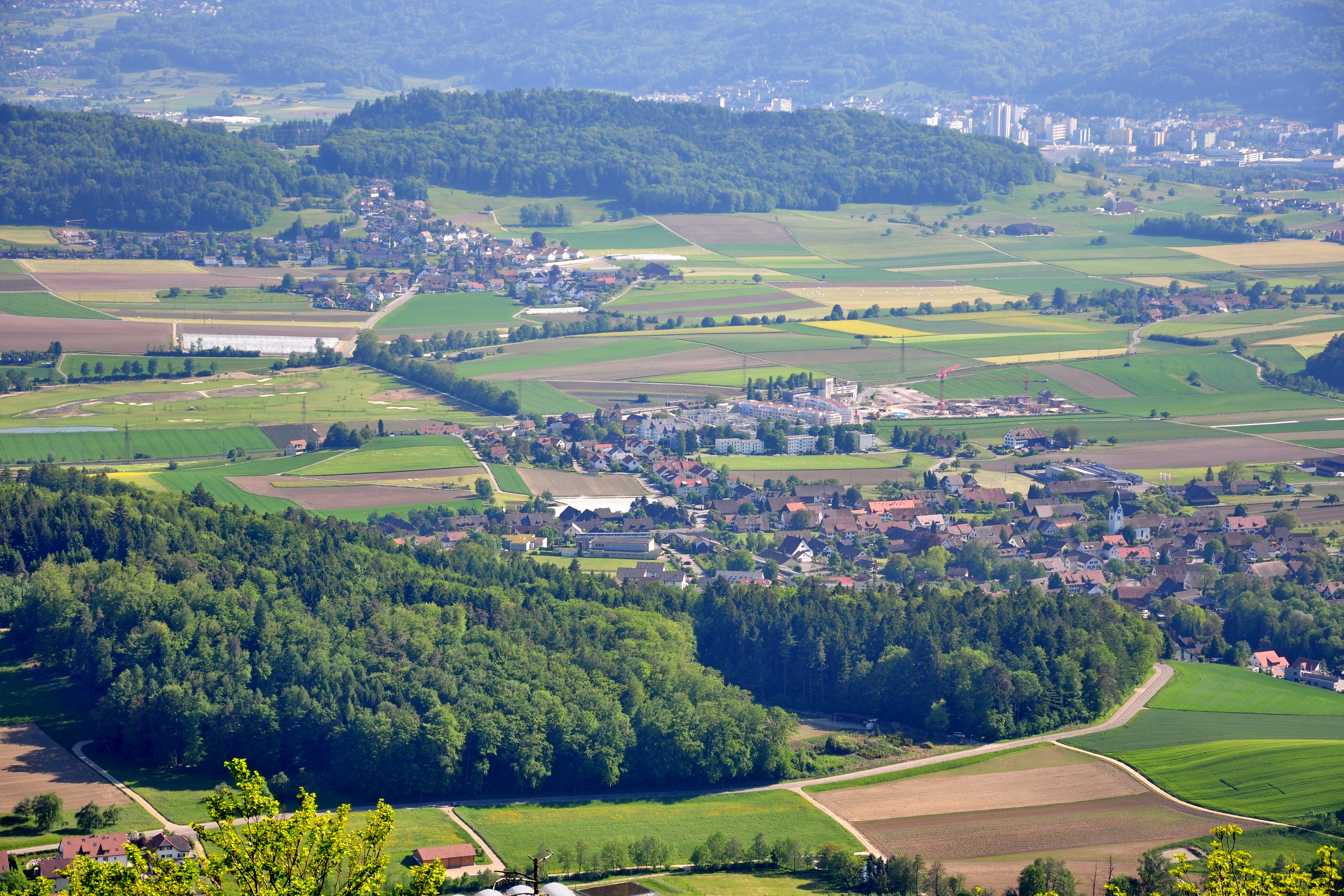

- Flag Coat of arms
- Location of Hüttikon
- Location within Switzerland Location within Canton of Zurich
- Coordinates: 47°27′N 8°23′E
- Country: Switzerland
- Canton: Zurich
- District: Dielsdorf

Area
  - Total: 1.62 km^{2} (0.63 sq mi)
- Elevation: 433 m (1,421 ft)

Population (December 2020)
  - Total: 951
  - Density: 587/km^{2} (1,520/sq mi)
- Time zone: UTC+01:00 (CET)
  - Summer (DST): UTC+02:00 (CEST)
- Postal code: 8115
- SFOS number: 87
- ISO 3166 code: CH-ZH
- Surrounded by: Dänikon, Oetwil an der Limmat, Otelfingen, Würenlos (AG)
- Website: www.huettikon.ch

Hüttikon is a municipality in the district of Dielsdorf in the canton of Zürich in Switzerland.

== History ==
Hüttikon is first mentioned in 883 as Huttinchova.

Aerial view (1958)

== Geography ==
Hüttikon has an area of 1.6 km^{2} (0.62 sq mi). Of this area, 52.2% is used for agricultural purposes, while 36% is forested. The rest of the land, (11.8%) is settled.

The municipality is located in the Furttal on the border with the Canton of Aargau. It includes the village of Hüttikon and the hamlet of Hüttikerberg.

== Demographics ==
Hüttikon has a population (as of 31 December 2020) of 951. As of 2007, 18.8% of the population was made up of foreign nationals. Over the last 10 years the population has grown at a rate of 24.4%. Most of the population (as of 2000) speaks German (89.3%), with Portuguese being second most common ( 4.5%) and Italian being third ( 0.8%).

In the 2007 election the most popular party was the SVP which received 63.4% of the vote. The next three most popular parties were the SPS (10.6%), the FDP (8.3%) and the CSP (7.1%).

The age distribution of the population (as of 2000) is children and teenagers (0–19 years old) make up 23.3% of the population, while adults (20–64 years old) make up 66.4% and seniors (over 64 years old) make up 10.3%. The entire Swiss population is generally well educated. In Hüttikon about 76.6% of the population (between age 25-64) have completed either non-mandatory upper secondary education or additional higher education (either university or a Fachhochschule).

Hüttikon has an unemployment rate of 1.42%. As of 2005, there were 33 people employed in the primary economic sector and about 11 businesses involved in this sector. 270 people are employed in the secondary sector and there are 10 businesses in this sector. 45 people are employed in the tertiary sector, with 14 businesses in this sector.

The historical population is given in the following table:

year	population
1634	71
1836	167
1850	178
1900	120
1950	154
1970	256
2000	533
