= Dielsdorf District =

Coordinates: 47°29′N 8°27′E

Dielsdorf District Bezirk Dielsdorf
- District
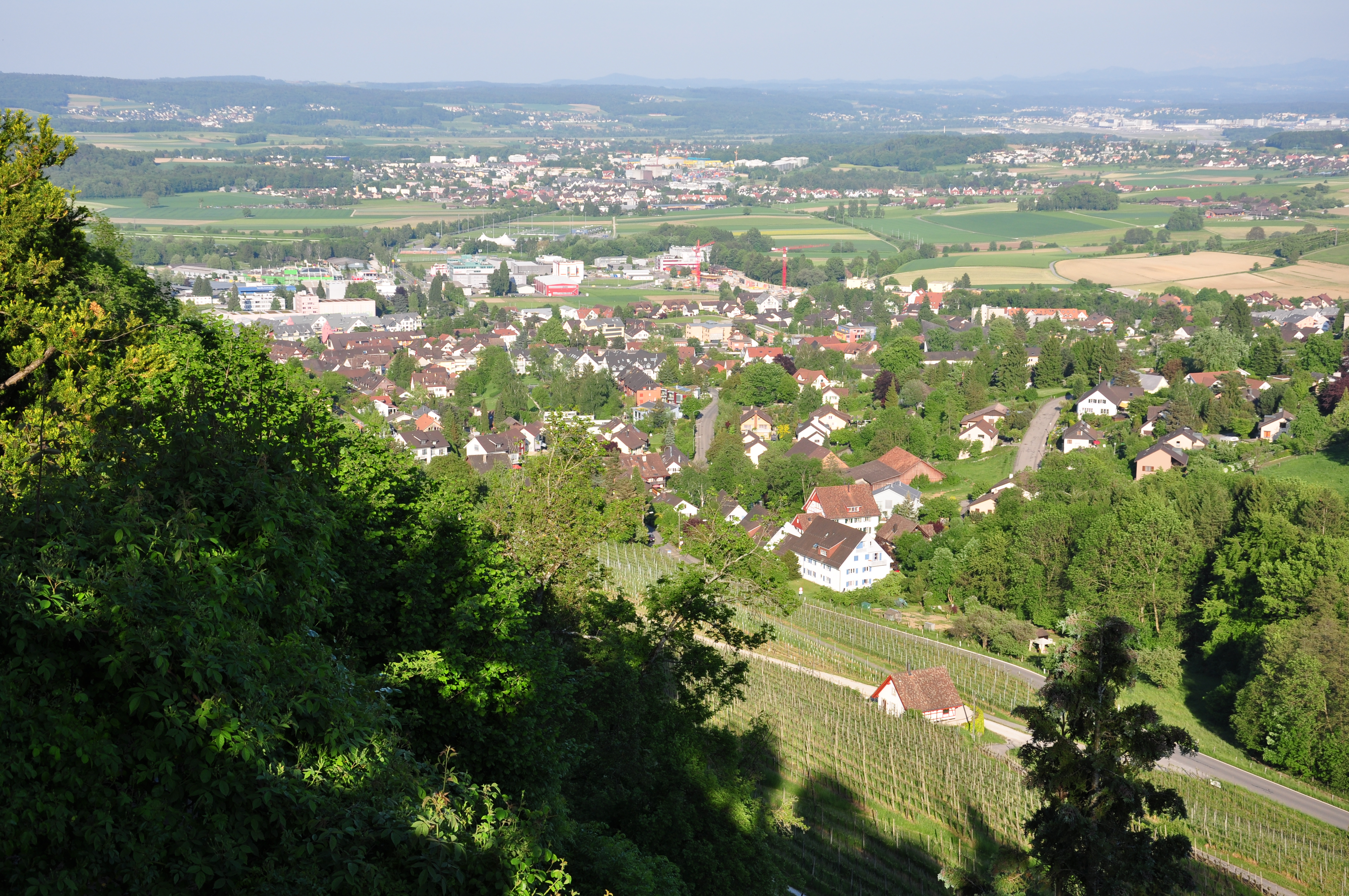
- Dielsdorf as seen from Regensberg

- Flag Coat of arms
- Country: Switzerland
- Canton: Zürich
- Capital: Dielsdorf

Area
  - Total: 152.73 km^{2} (58.97 sq mi)

Population (31 December 2020)
  - Total: 92,079
  - Density: 602.89/km^{2} (1,561.5/sq mi)
- Time zone: UTC+1 (CET)
  - Summer (DST): UTC+2 (CEST)
- Municipalities: 22

Dielsdorf District is a district in the northwestern part of the Swiss canton of Zürich.

Since 1871 the administrative center of the district is located in Dielsdorf. Previously the district was named Bezirk Regensberg, and its capital was Regensberg.

== Municipalities ==
	Name	Population (31 December 2020)	Area in km^{2}	SFSO number
8164	Bachs	613	9.12	0081
8113	Boppelsen	1,472	3.94	0082
8107	Buchs	6,555	5.87	0083
8108	Dällikon	4,278	4.50	0084
8114	Dänikon	1,846	2.80	0085
8157	Dielsdorf	5,968	5.86	0086
8115	Hüttikon	951	1.60	0087
8173	Neerach	3,229	6.01	0088
8172	Niederglatt	4,938	3.62	0089
8155	Niederhasli	9,449	11.24	0090
8166	Niederweningen	3,089	6.88	0091
8154	Oberglatt	7,386	8.29	0092
8165	Oberweningen	1,897	4.86	0093
8112	Otelfingen	2,943	7.23	0094
8158	Regensberg	459	2.39	0095
8105	Regensdorf	18,568	14.62	0096
8153	Rümlang	8,277	12.39	0097
8165	Schleinikon	858	5.65	0098
8165	Schöfflisdorf	1,394	4.05	0099
8174	Stadel	2,336	12.85	0100
8162	Steinmaur	3,583	9.39	0101
8187	Weiach	1,990	9.57	0102
	Total	92,079	152.73	0104

== See also ==
- Municipalities of the canton of Zürich
