= Dänikon =

- Municipality
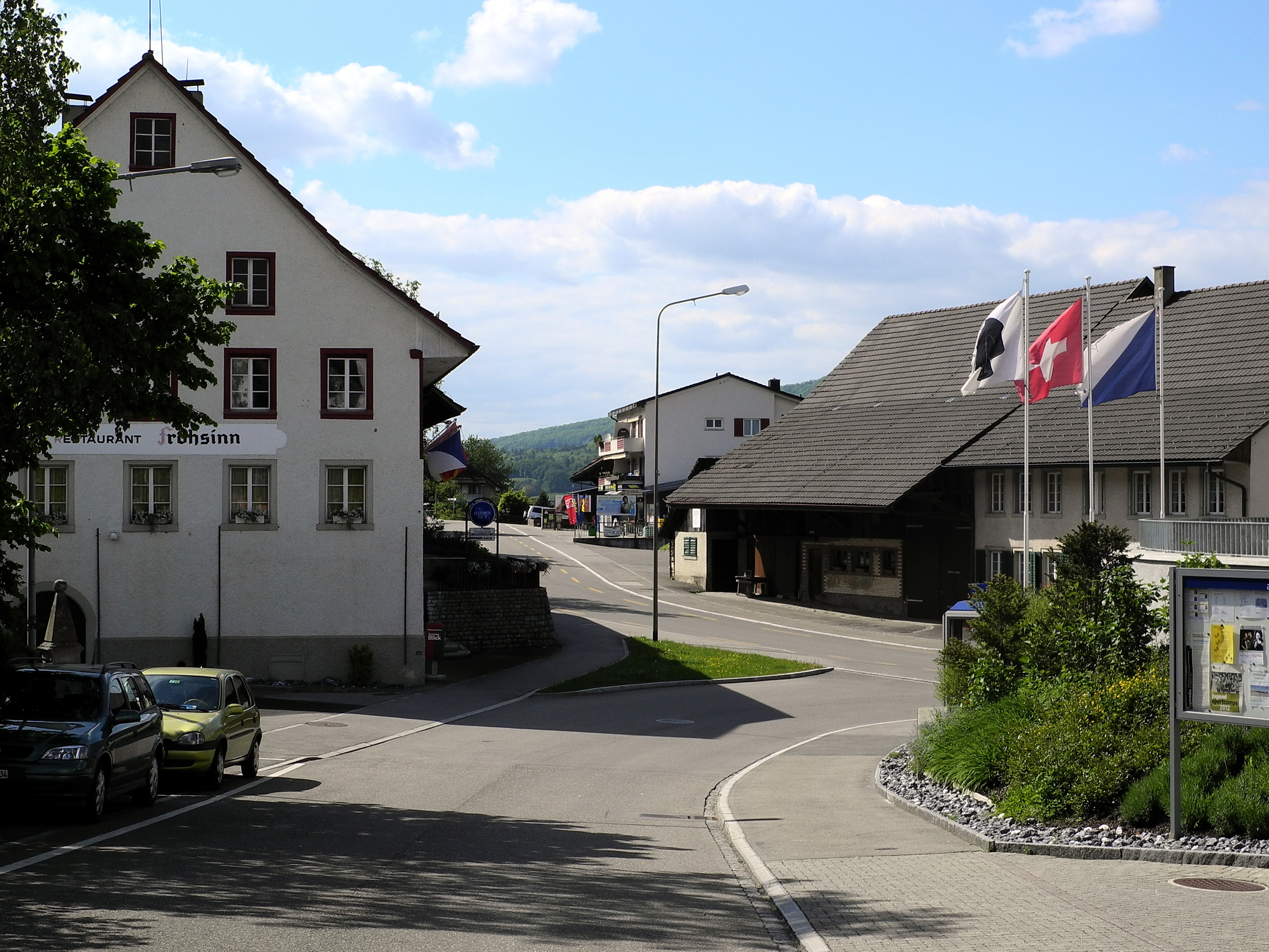
- Main street in Dänikon

- Flag Coat of arms
- Location of Dänikon
- Location within Switzerland Location within Canton of Zurich
- Coordinates: 47°27′N 8°24′E
- Country: Switzerland
- Canton: Zurich
- District: Dielsdorf

Area
  - Total: 2.77 km^{2} (1.07 sq mi)
- Elevation: 437 m (1,434 ft)

Population (December 2020)
  - Total: 1,846
  - Density: 666/km^{2} (1,730/sq mi)
- Time zone: UTC+01:00 (CET)
  - Summer (DST): UTC+02:00 (CEST)
- Postal code: 8114
- SFOS number: 85
- ISO 3166 code: CH-ZH
- Surrounded by: Buchs, Dällikon, Hüttikon, Oetwil an der Limmat, Otelfingen
- Website: www.daenikon.ch

Dänikon is a municipality in the district of Dielsdorf in the canton of Zürich in Switzerland.

== History ==
Dänikon is first mentioned in 1130 as Täninchoven.

Until 1843 it was part of the municipality of Dällikon.

== Geography ==
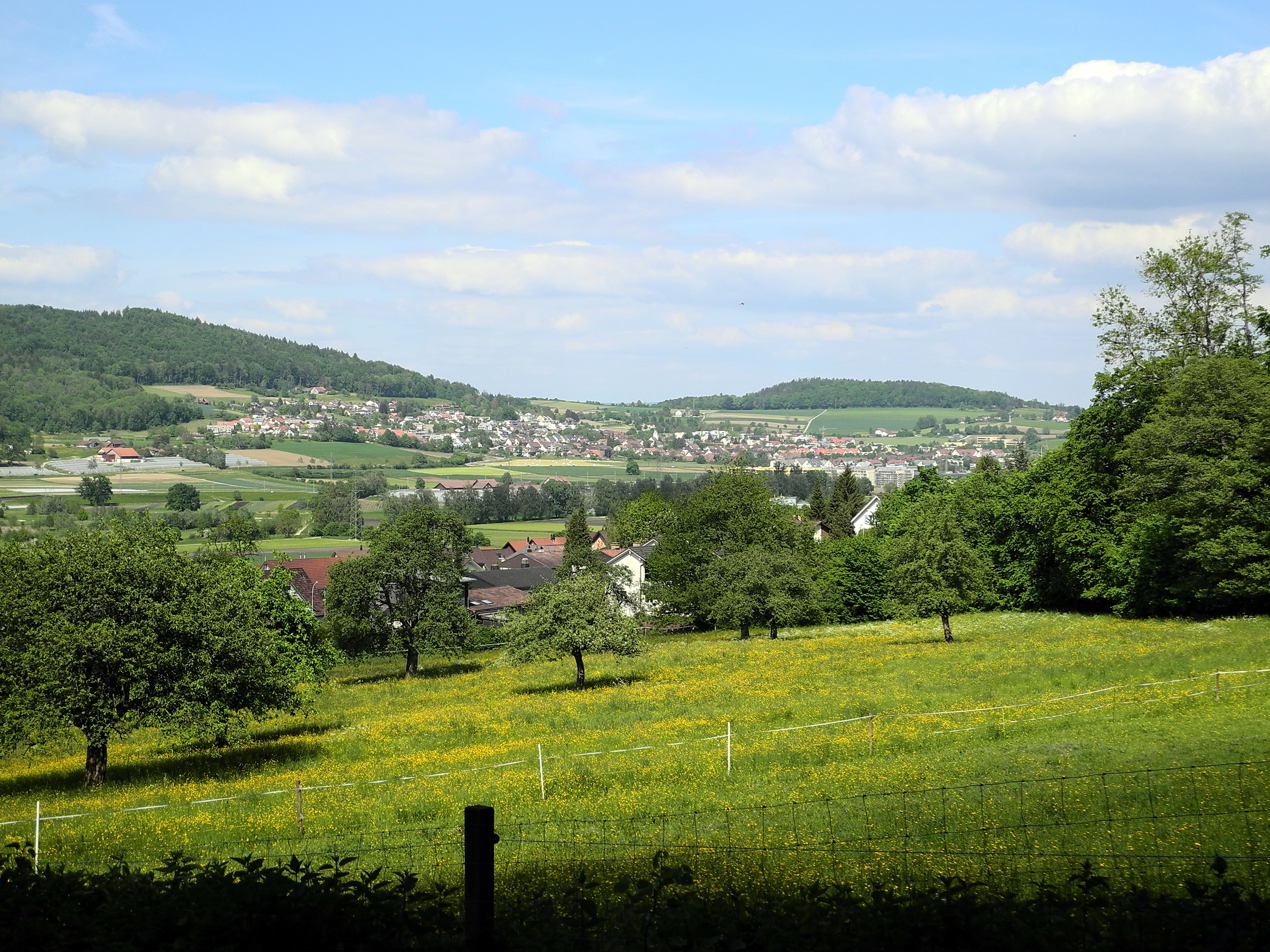
Buchs, Lägern and Dänikon villages

Aerial view (1950)

Dänikon has an area of 2.8 km^{2} (1.1 sq mi). Of this area, 53.6% is used for agricultural purposes, while 31.8% is forested. Of the rest of the land, 13.6% is settled (buildings or roads) and the remainder (1.1%) is non-productive (rivers, glaciers or mountains).

The municipality is located on the left side of the Furttal.

== Demographics ==
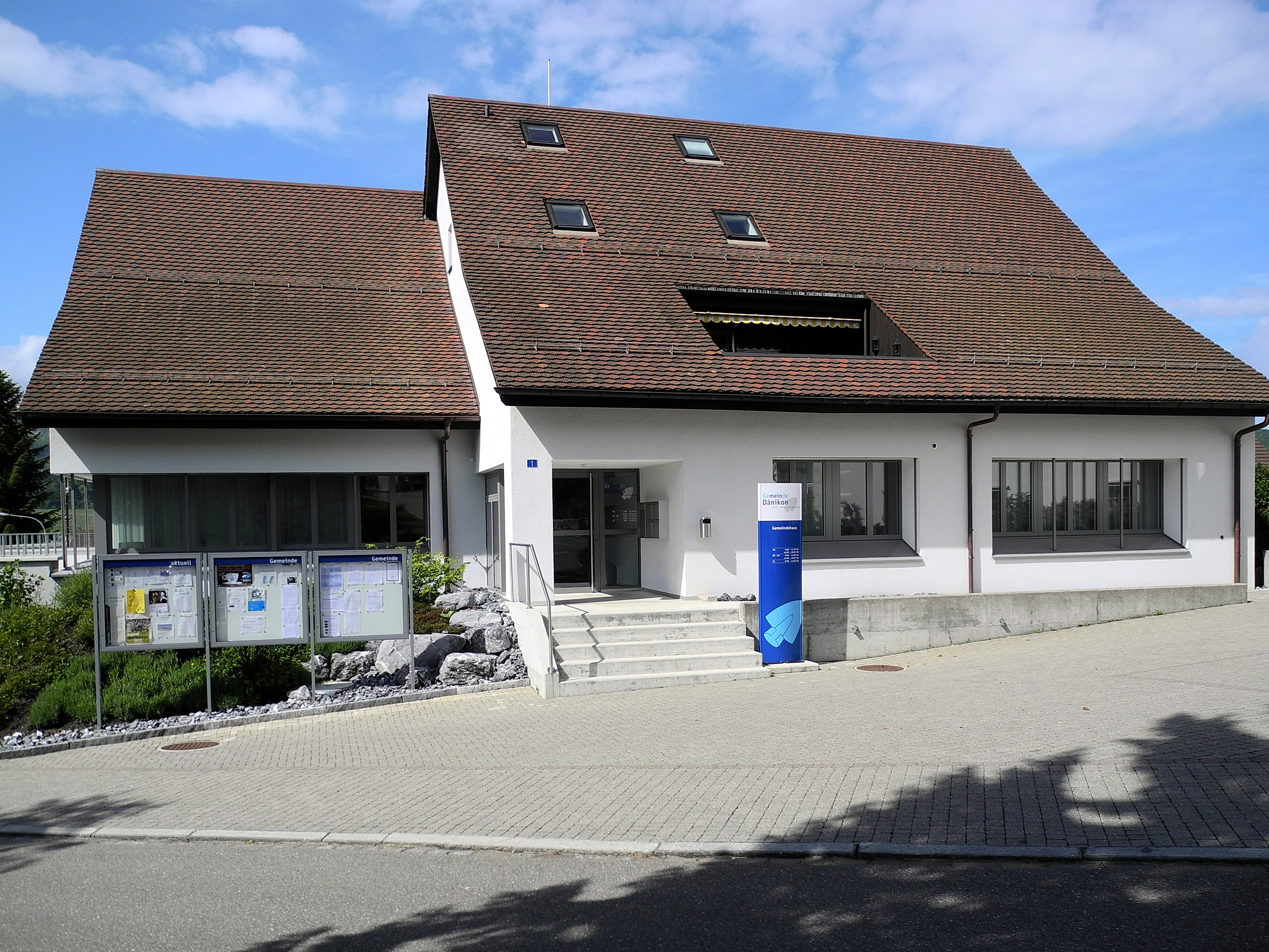
Municipal administration building of Dänikon

Dänikon has a population (as of 31 December 2020) of 1,846. As of 2007, 23.9% of the population was made up of foreign nationals. Over the last 10 years the population has grown at a rate of 2.9%. Most of the population (as of 2000) speaks German (87.4%), with Italian being second most common ( 2.6%) and Turkish being third ( 2.2%).

In the 2007 election the most popular party was the SVP which received 47.4% of the vote. The next three most popular parties were the SPS (14.7%), the FDP (9.6%) and the CSP (9.3%).

The age distribution of the population (as of 2000) is children and teenagers (0–19 years old) make up 28% of the population, while adults (20–64 years old) make up 65.7% and seniors (over 64 years old) make up 6.3%. The entire Swiss population is generally well educated. In Dänikon about 75.9% of the population (between age 25-64) have completed either non-mandatory upper secondary education or additional higher education (either University or a Fachhochschule).

Dänikon has an unemployment rate of 3.08%. As of 2005, there were 68 people employed in the primary economic sector and about 10 businesses involved in this sector. 235 people are employed in the secondary sector and there are 26 businesses in this sector. 121 people are employed in the tertiary sector, with 35 businesses in this sector.

The historical population is given in the following table:

year	population
1467	7 Households
1634	88
1799	173
1850	238
1900	192
1950	175
1970	373
2000	1,749
