= Boppelsen =

- Municipality
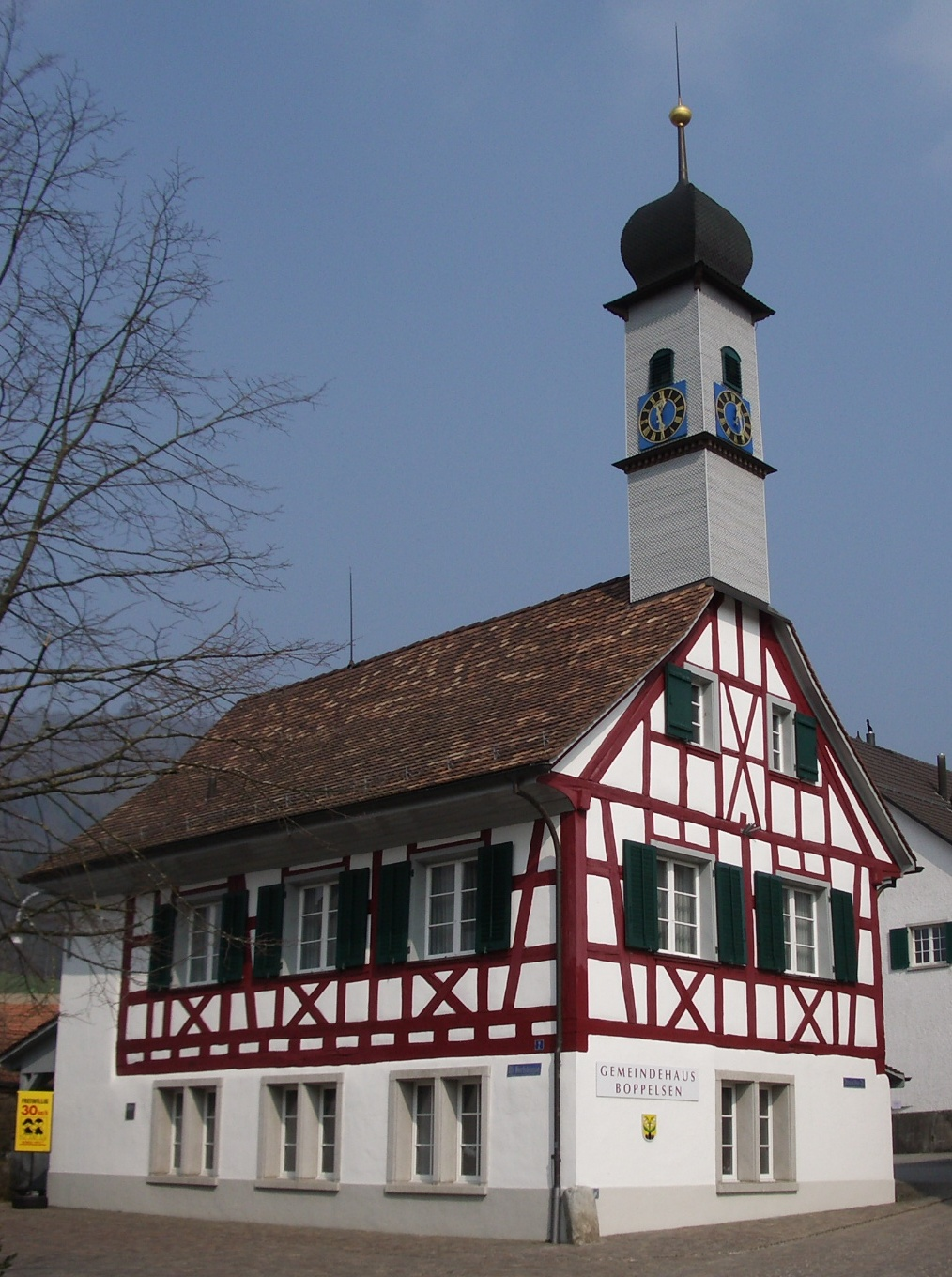

- Flag Coat of arms
- Location of Boppelsen
- Location within Switzerland Location within Canton of Zurich
- Coordinates: 47°28′N 8°24′E
- Country: Switzerland
- Canton: Zurich
- District: Dielsdorf

Area
  - Total: 3.94 km^{2} (1.52 sq mi)
- Elevation: 521 m (1,709 ft)

Population (December 2020)
  - Total: 1,472
  - Density: 374/km^{2} (968/sq mi)
- Time zone: UTC+01:00 (CET)
  - Summer (DST): UTC+02:00 (CEST)
- Postal code: 8113
- SFOS number: 82
- ISO 3166 code: CH-ZH
- Surrounded by: Buchs, Otelfingen, Regensberg, Schleinikon
- Website: www.boppelsen.ch

Boppelsen is a municipality in the district of Dielsdorf in the canton of Zürich in Switzerland.

== History ==
Aerial view from 1200 m by Walter Mittelholzer (1919)

Boppelsen is first mentioned in 1130 as de Bobpinsolo.

== Geography ==
Boppelsen has an area of 3.9 km^{2} (1.5 sq mi). Of this area, 42.6% is used for agricultural purposes, while 47.4% is forested. Of the rest of the land, 9.7% is settled (buildings or roads) and the remainder (0.3%) is non-productive (rivers, glaciers or mountains).

The municipality is located in the hills above the Furttal.

== Demographics ==
Boppelsen has a population (as of 31 December 2020) of 1,472. As of 2007, 11.2% of the population was made up of foreign nationals. Over the last 10 years the population has grown at a rate of 41.7%. Most of the population (as of 2000) speaks German (92.2%), with Portuguese being second most common ( 2.7%) and French being third ( 0.7%).

In the 2007 election the most popular party was the SVP which received 39.8% of the vote. The next three most popular parties were the FDP (16.9%), the CSP (15.1%) and the SPS (10.3%).

The age distribution of the population (as of 2000) is children and teenagers (0–19 years old) make up 21.6% of the population, while adults (20–64 years old) make up 68.4% and seniors (over 64 years old) make up 10%. About 87.8% of the population (between age 25–64) have completed either non-mandatory upper secondary education or additional higher education (either university or a Fachhochschule).

Boppelsen has an unemployment rate of 1.44%. As of 2005, there were 112 people employed in the primary economic sector and about 17 businesses involved in this sector. 21 people are employed in the secondary sector and there are 8 businesses in this sector. 82 people are employed in the tertiary sector, with 31 businesses in this sector. The historical population is given in the following table:

year	population
1634	168
1709	206
1850	334
1900	256
1910	234
1950	292
2000	1,018
