= Lägern =

Mountain of the Jura Mountains

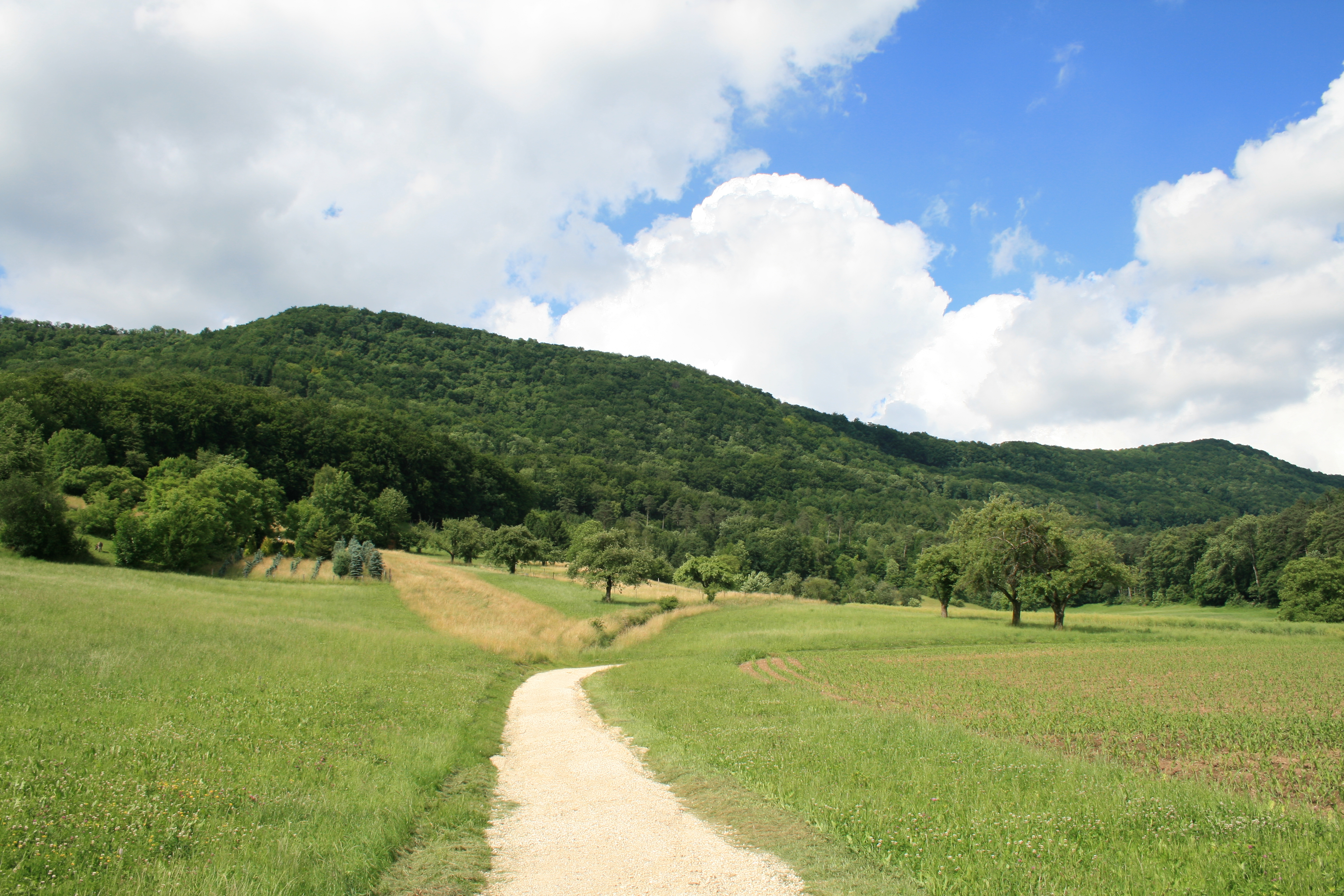
- View from Wettingen (south side)

Highest point
- Elevation: 866 m (2,841 ft)
- Prominence: 425 m (1,394 ft)
- Parent peak: Tweralpspitz
- Isolation: 16.4 km (10.2 mi)
- Coordinates: 47°28′54″N 8°23′41″E

Geography
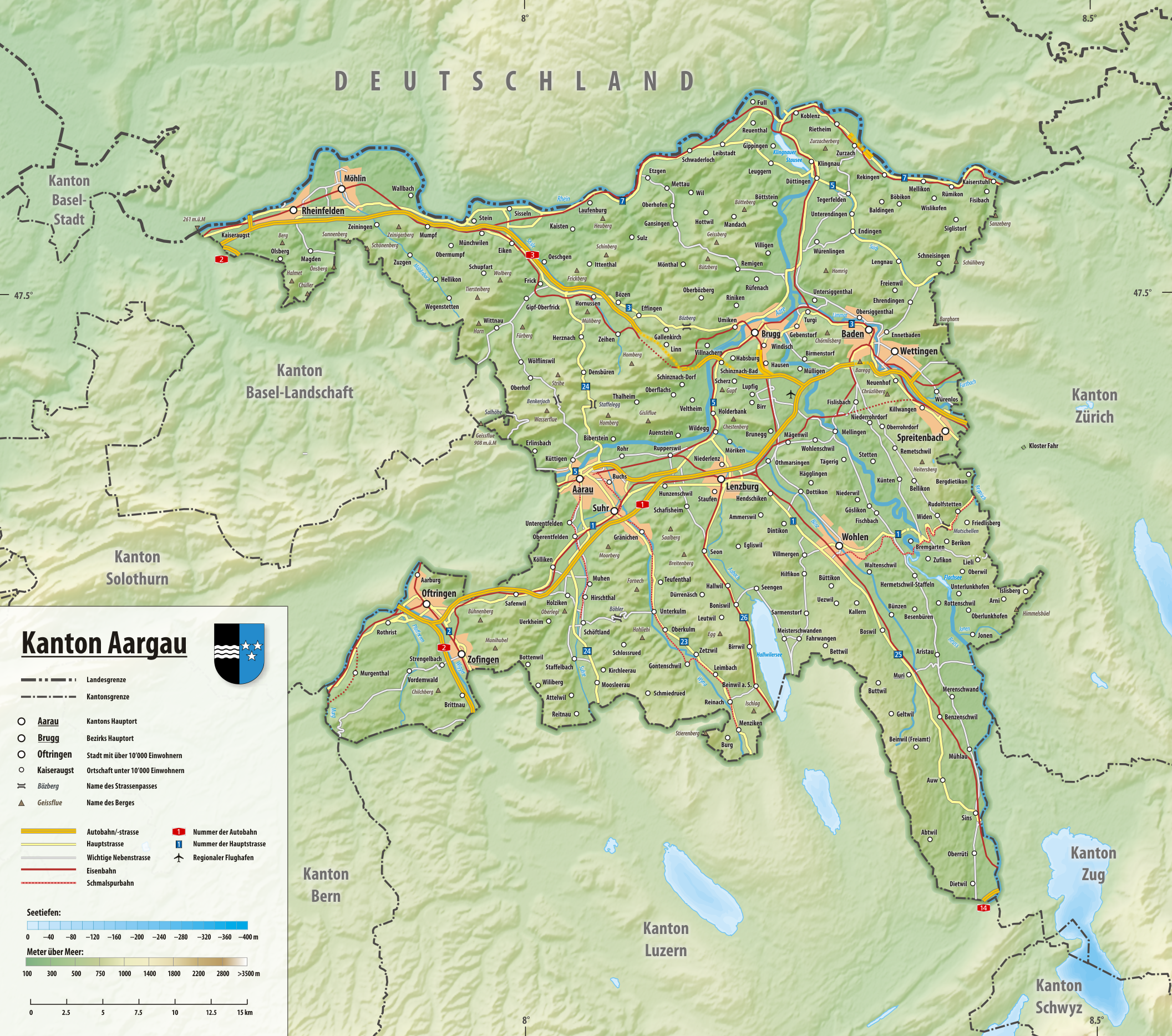
- Location within Switzerland Location within Canton of Aargau Location within Canton of Zurich
- Location: Zurich, Switzerland (massif partially in Aargau)
- Parent range: Jura Mountains

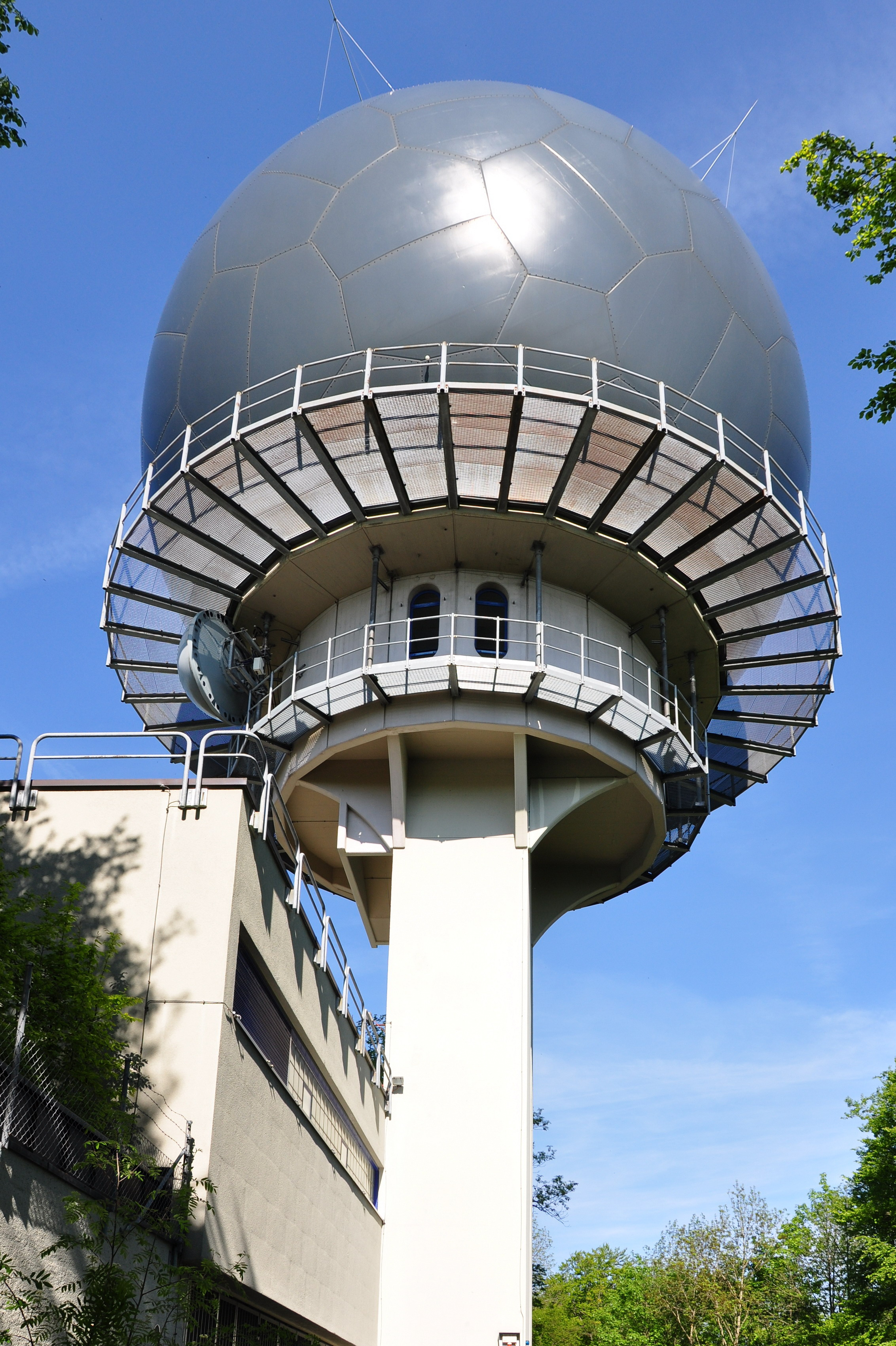
Lägern radar

The Lägern (Swiss Standard German pronunciation: [ˈlɛːɡərn]; also spelled Lägeren) is a 866 m (2,841 ft)-high wooded mountain of the Jura Mountains, stretching from Baden to Dielsdorf. It is located about 15 km (9.3 mi) north-west of Zurich. The culminating point is located 1 km (0.62 mi) west of Hochwacht within the canton of Zurich. The border with the canton of Aargau runs across a slightly lower summit named Burghorn, at an elevation of 859 m (2,818 ft).

The mountain lies in the easternmost part of the Jura Mountains, east of the river Aare. It is the highest summit of the range lying between the High Rhine, Aare and Limmat. Its location east of the Aare makes it topographically connected to the Appenzell Alps by the chain of hills running north of Lake Zurich.

The Lägern is paralleled by two valleys: the Furttal to the south and the Wehntal to the north. To the west lies the Limmat Valley and to the east the Glatt Valley.

A trail follows the crest of the mountain, from Baden to Dielsdorf. From Dielsdorf, a road also leads to Hochwacht, where a radar is operated by Skyguide (municipality of Boppelsen).

== Climate ==
Climate data for Lägern (1981-2010)
Month	Jan	Feb	Mar	Apr	May	Jun	Jul	Aug	Sep	Oct	Nov	Dec	Year
Mean daily maximum °C (°F)	1.0 (33.8)	1.9 (35.4)	6.1 (43.0)	10.3 (50.5)	14.9 (58.8)	17.9 (64.2)	20.3 (68.5)	19.8 (67.6)	15.5 (59.9)	10.9 (51.6)	5.1 (41.2)	2.0 (35.6)	10.5 (50.9)
Daily mean °C (°F)	−1.1 (30.0)	−0.4 (31.3)	3.1 (37.6)	6.6 (43.9)	11.1 (52.0)	14.1 (57.4)	16.4 (61.5)	16.2 (61.2)	12.3 (54.1)	8.2 (46.8)	2.8 (37.0)	−0.2 (31.6)	7.4 (45.3)
Mean daily minimum °C (°F)	−3.3 (26.1)	−2.6 (27.3)	0.4 (32.7)	3.2 (37.8)	7.6 (45.7)	10.6 (51.1)	12.8 (55.0)	12.9 (55.2)	9.4 (48.9)	5.7 (42.3)	0.8 (33.4)	−2.3 (27.9)	4.6 (40.3)
Mean monthly sunshine hours	69	91	128	158	186	207	233	211	161	110	71	54	1,679
Source: MeteoSwiss

== See also ==
- List of most isolated mountains of Switzerland
