= Altberg =

Range of hills near Zurich, Switzerland

Coordinates: 47.43356°N 8.42057°E

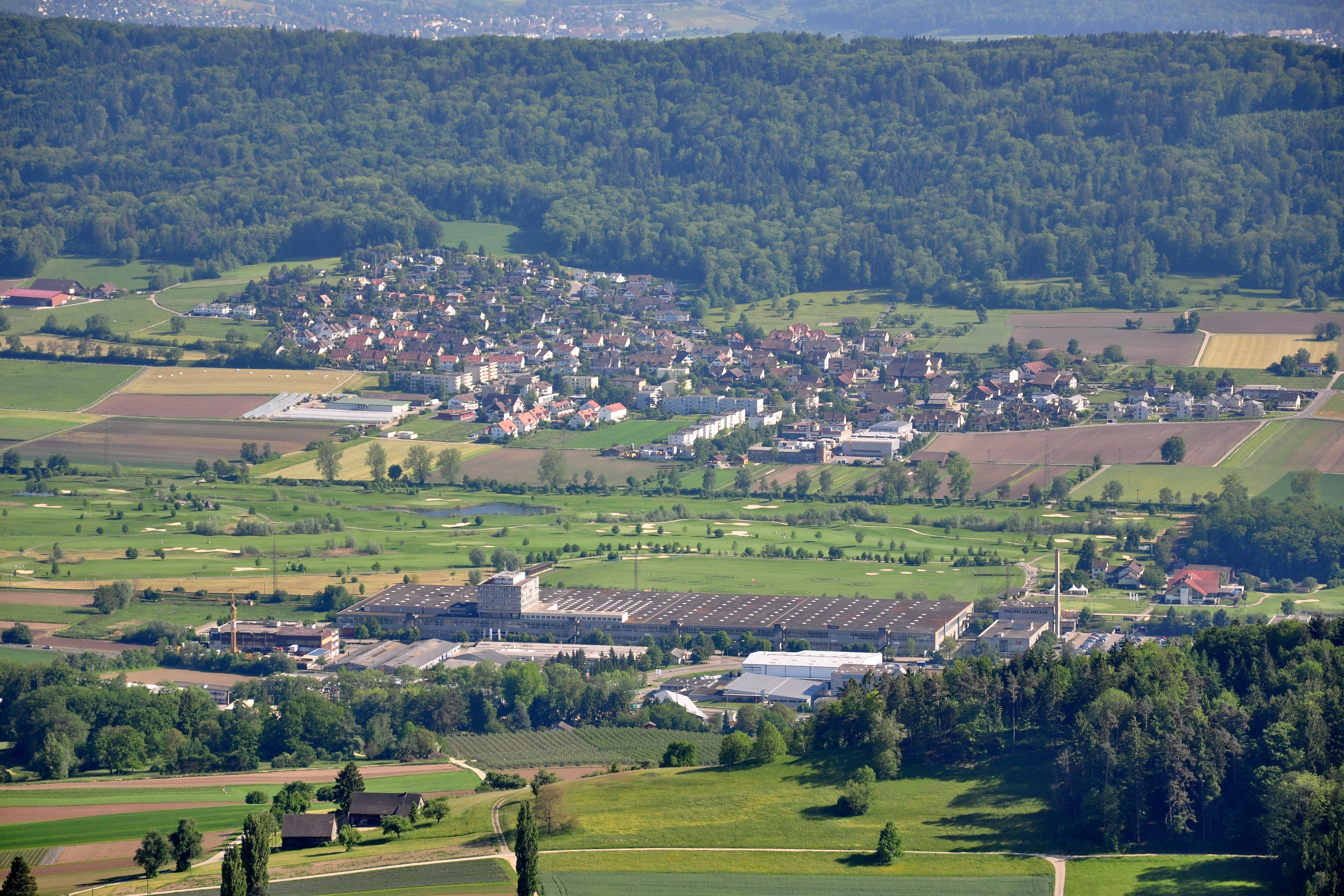
A view on the northern slope of Altberg

Altberg is a range of hills in the canton of Zurich, Switzerland. It runs between the Limmat Valley in the south and the Furttal valley in the north. Its height is up to 631 metres (2,070 ft) above sea level.

In 2020, a 35-metre (115 ft) Altberg observation tower was built.

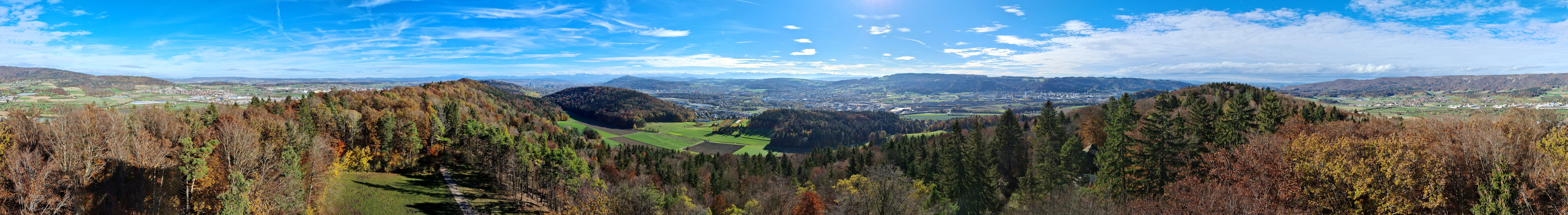
360° panorama from the Altberg tower
