= Würenlos =

- Municipality
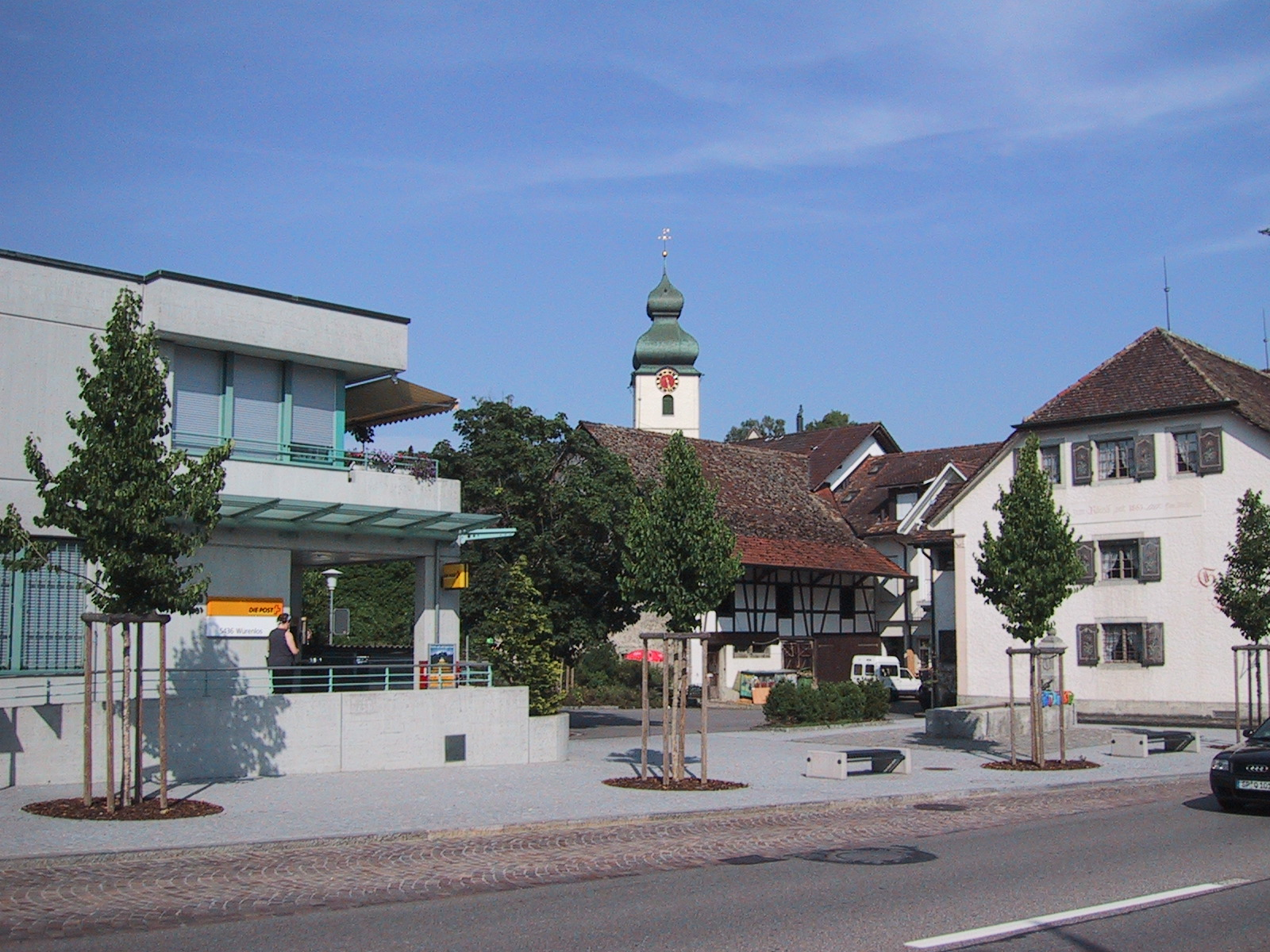
- Würenlos village center

- Flag Coat of arms
- Location of Würenlos
- Location within Switzerland Location within Canton of Aargau
- Coordinates: 47°27′N 8°22′E
- Country: Switzerland
- Canton: Aargau
- District: Baden

Area
  - Total: 9.03 km^{2} (3.49 sq mi)
- Elevation: 421 m (1,381 ft)

Population (December 2020)
  - Total: 6,511
  - Density: 721/km^{2} (1,870/sq mi)
- Time zone: UTC+01:00 (CET)
  - Summer (DST): UTC+02:00 (CEST)
- Postal code: 5436
- SFOS number: 4048
- ISO 3166 code: CH-AG
- Surrounded by: Wettingen, Otelfingen, Hüttikon, Oetwil an der Limmat, Spreitenbach, Killwangen, Neuenhof
- Website: www.wuerenlos.ch

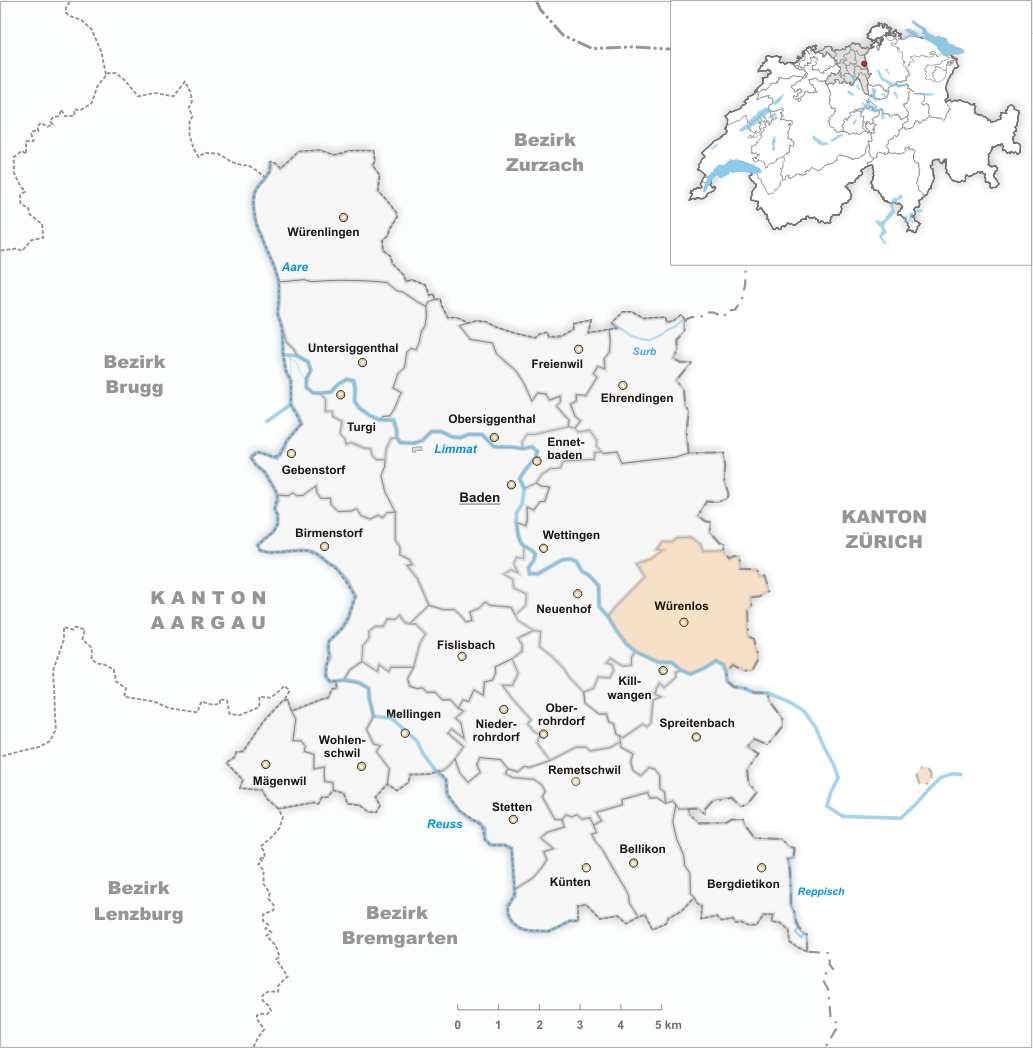
Würenlos

Würenlos is a municipality in the district of Baden in the canton of Aargau in Switzerland. It lies north of the river Limmat, next to the canton of Zürich, located in the Limmat Valley (German: Limmattal).

== Geography ==
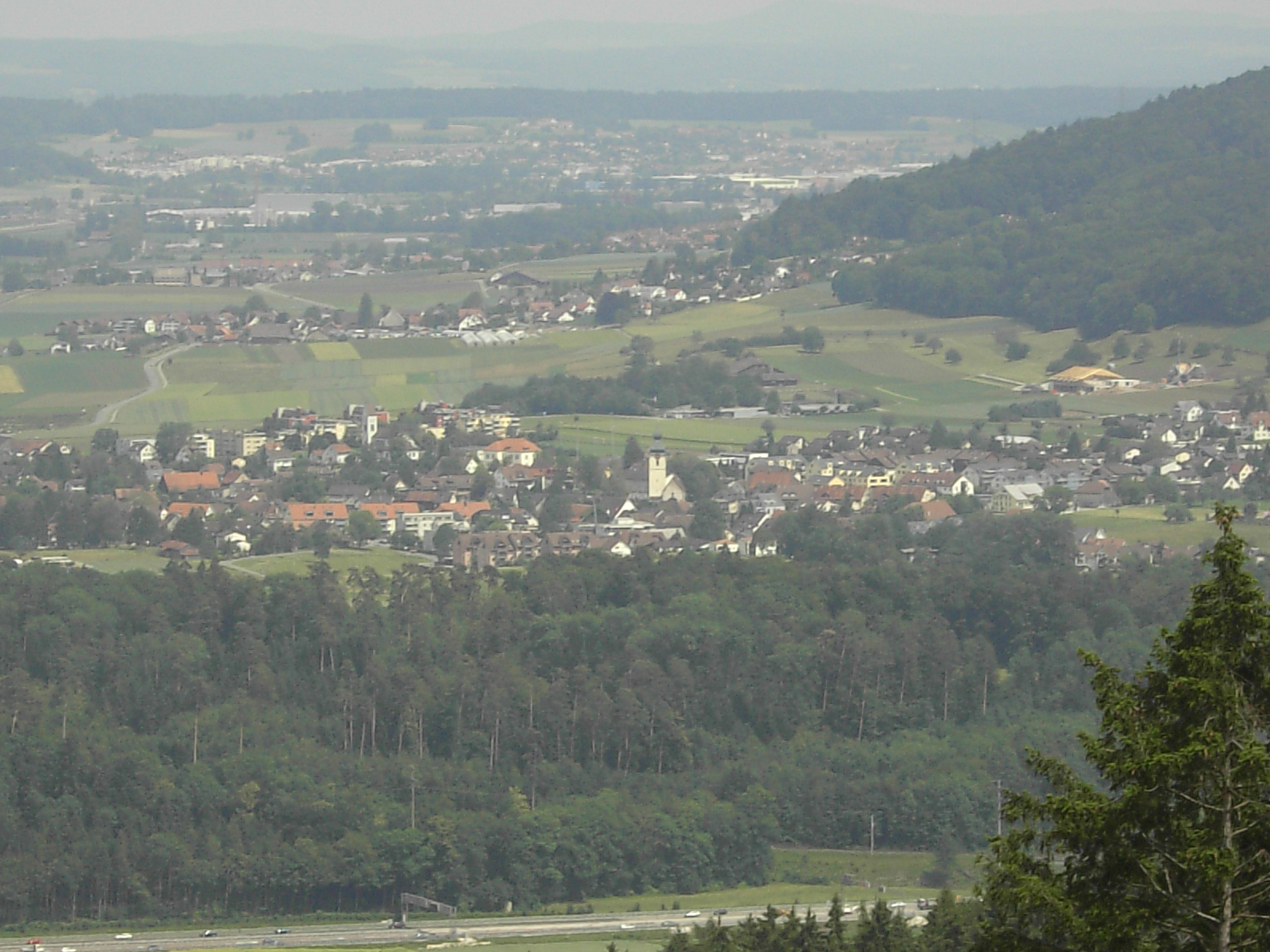
Würenlos from the Rüsler (ob Neuenhof)

Aerial view (1962)

Würenlos has an area, as of 2006, of 9 square kilometers (3.5 sq mi). Of this area, 43.1% is used for agricultural purposes, while 34.1% is forested. Of the rest of the land, 20.7% is settled (buildings or roads) and the remainder (2.1%) is non-productive (rivers or lakes).

Since 2008 Fahr Monastery forms a small exclave of the municipality, otherwise surrounded by Unterengstringen of canton Zürich.

== Coat of arms ==
The blazon of the municipal coat of arms is Per fess Argent and Gules a Key in pale counterchanged.

== Demographics ==
Würenlos has a population (as of 31 December 2020) of 6,511. As of 2008, 13.1% of the population was made up of foreign nationals. Over the last 10 years the population has grown at a rate of 14.3%. Most of the population (as of 2000) speaks German (92.4%), with Italian being second most common ( 1.5%) and French being third ( 1.2%).

The age distribution, as of 2008, in Würenlos is; 548 children or 10.4% of the population are between 0 and 9 years old and 627 teenagers or 11.9% are between 10 and 19. Of the adult population, 497 people or 9.4% of the population are between 20 and 29 years old. 655 people or 12.4% are between 30 and 39, 1,009 people or 19.1% are between 40 and 49, and 762 people or 14.5% are between 50 and 59. The senior population distribution is 663 people or 12.6% of the population are between 60 and 69 years old, 348 people or 6.6% are between 70 and 79, there are 134 people or 2.5% who are between 80 and 89, and there are 27 people or 0.5% who are 90 and older.

As of 2000, there were 152 homes with 1 or 2 persons in the household, 927 homes with 3 or 4 persons in the household, and 834 homes with 5 or more persons in the household. The average number of people per household was 2.43 individuals. In 2008 there were 945 single family homes (or 40.8% of the total) out of a total of 2,318 homes and apartments. There were a total of 4 empty apartments for a 0.2% vacancy rate. As of 2007, the construction rate of new housing units was 4.4 new units per 1000 residents.

In the 2007 federal election the most popular party was the SVP which received 36.3% of the vote. The next three most popular parties were the CVP (18.8%), the FDP (14.2%) and the SP (13.5%).

In Würenlos about 83.8% of the population (between age 25-64) have completed either non-mandatory upper secondary education or additional higher education (either university or a Fachhochschule). Of the school age population (in the 2008/2009 school year), there are 417 students attending primary school, there are 140 students attending secondary school in the municipality.

The historical population is given in the following table:

Historical population
Year	Pop.	±%
1975	3,087	—
1980	3,250	+5.3%
1990	4,151	+27.7%
2000	4,806	+15.8%

== Heritage sites of national significance ==
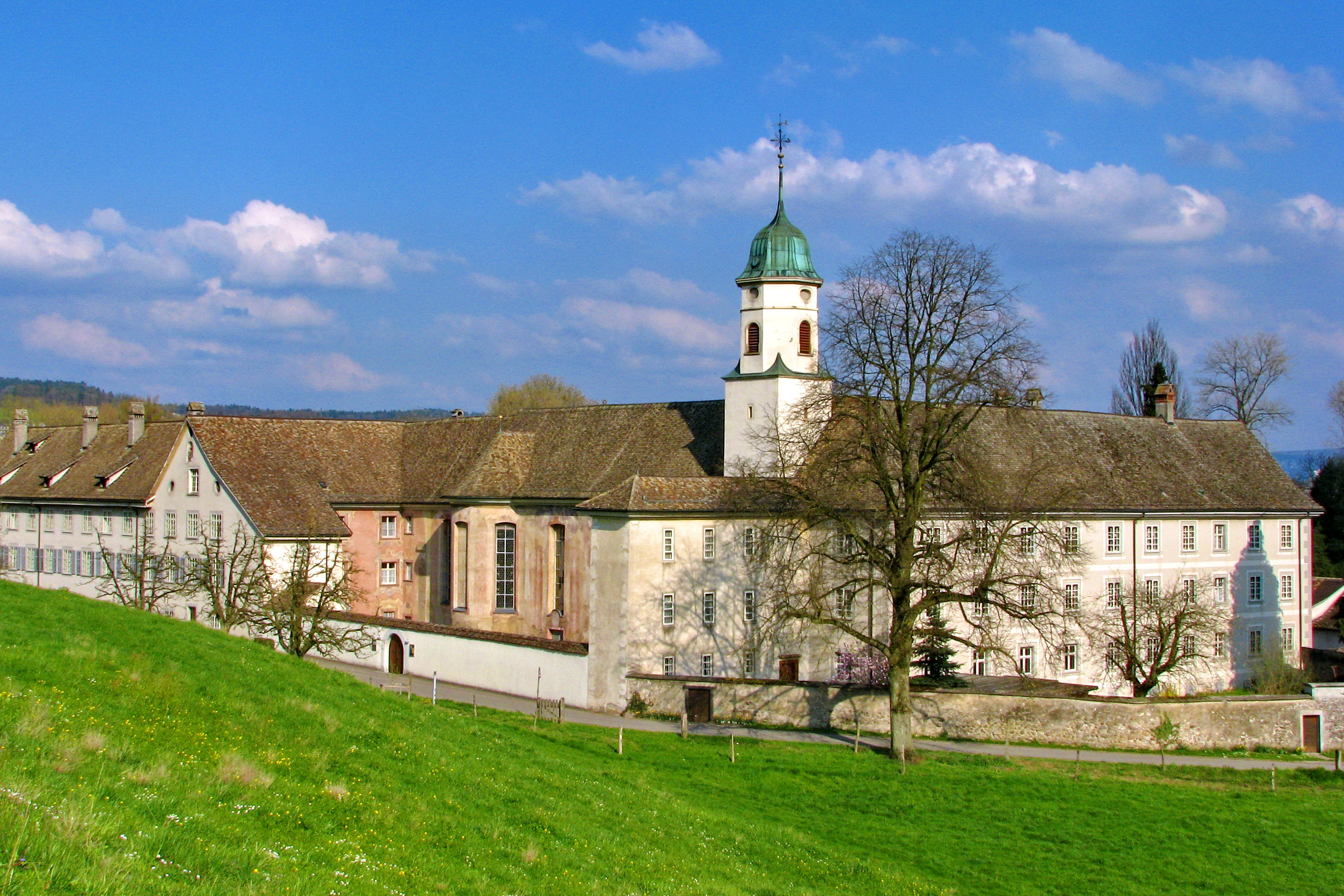
Benedictine women's convent of Fahr

The Benedictine women's convent of Fahr in Würenlos was founded around 1130 AD. It is listed as a heritage site of national significance, as is the Ancient Roman quarry in Würenlos. The Emma Kunz painting collection was listed in the 1995 version of the Inventory, but not in 2008 listing.

== Economy ==
As of 2007, Würenlos had an unemployment rate of 1.69%. As of 2005, there were 111 people employed in the primary economic sector and about 27 businesses involved in this sector. 652 people are employed in the secondary sector and there are 56 businesses in this sector. 1,115 people are employed in the tertiary sector, with 192 businesses in this sector.

As of 2000 there was a total of 2,645 workers who lived in the municipality. Of these, 2,052 or about 77.6% of the residents worked outside Würenlos while 920 people commuted into the municipality for work. There were a total of 1,513 jobs (of at least 6 hours per week) in the municipality. Of the working population, 19.6% used public transportation to get to work, and 53.3% used a private car.

== Religion ==
From the 2000 census, 2,136 or 44.6% are Roman Catholic, while 1,750 or 36.5% belonged to the Swiss Reformed Church. Of the rest of the population, there are seven individuals (or about 0.15% of the population) who belong to the Christian Catholic faith.

== Transportation ==
Würenlos railway station is a stop of the S-Bahn Zürich on the line S6.

== Personalities ==
- Urs Meier (1959), football referee
