= Zurich–Zug–Lucerne Railway =

Swiss railway company

Zurich-Zug-Luzern railway
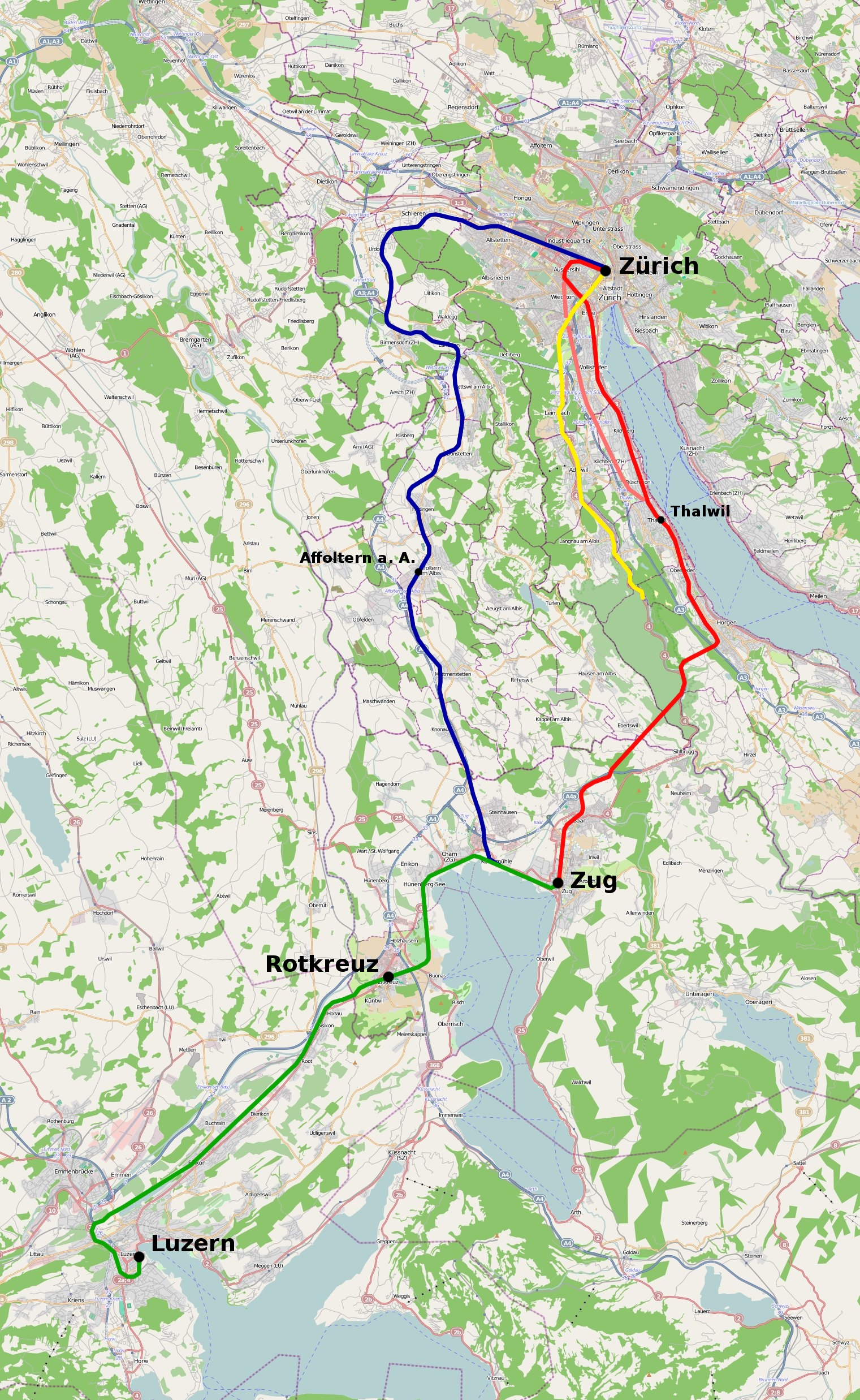
- Zurich-Lucerne railways: the original Zurich–Zug railway is shown in blue and the Zug–Lucerne railway is shown in green

Overview
- Line number: 670, 711
- Locale: Switzerland
- Termini: Zürich Hauptbahnhof; Lucerne

Technical
- Track gauge: 1,435 mm (4 ft 8 1/2 in)
- Electrification: 15 kV/16.7 Hz AC overhead catenary
- Maximum incline: 1.9%

The Zurich–Zug–Lucerne Railway (Zürich-Zug-Luzern-Bahn) is a former railway company that built railway lines in the Swiss cantons of Zurich, Zug and Lucerne from the 1860s. It was absorbed by the Swiss Federal Railways (SBB) in 1902. Its lines now form the Zurich–Zug railway (via Affoltern) and the Zug–Lucerne railway.

== History ==
=== East-west railway project ===
In 1857, Federal Councilor Jakob Stämpfli established the Swiss East–West Railway (Schweizerische Ostwestbahn, OWB), which was intended to implement a second railway line through the Central Plateau in direct competition with the Swiss Central Railway (Schweizerische Centralbahn, SCB). The Basle-based SCB had acquired licenses to build and operate railways in Aarau, Lucerne, Bern and Biel and controlled the rail traffic in the Central Plateau. The OWB was to compete as a Bern-based railway company in direct competition with the SCB.

The OWB projected a railway line from La Neuveville via Biel, Bern, Langnau im Emmental, Lucerne and Zug to Zurich and began construction without securing the funding for the line. The OWB was only able to open a line between Frienisberg (in Le Landeron) and Biel on 3 December 1860 before going bankrupt. In April 1861, the canton of Bern founded the Bern State Railways (Bernische Staatsbahn, BSB), which took over the bankrupt OWB on 1 June 1861. The BSB completed the projects in the canton of Bern that construction had commenced on in 1864.

=== Construction by the Northeastern Railway ===
the Swiss Northeastern Railway (Schweizerische Nordostbahn, NOB) took over the planning and concession for the Zurich–Zug–Lucerne line from the OWB's bankrupt estate. The Zurich-based NOB created a subsidiary called the Zürich-Zug-Lucerne railway (ZZL) and, after minor revisions of the project, began building the line.

Basically planned as a single route, the topography allowed the low-cost connection to Zug only by means of a branch line, which was connected at Kollermühle by means of a large triangular junction ("wye"). The Altstetten–Zug and Kollermühle–Gütsch sections and the Knonau-Cham connecting curve were put into operation together by the ZZL on 1 June 1864. The triangular junction allowed the direct connection of the Zurich–Zug, Zug–Lucerne and Lucerne–Zurich lines.

Altstetten station was redesigned as a Keilbahnhof (a station located between branching tracks) for the connection of the ZZL to the NOB's Zurich–Brugg line and a new station building was built to plans by Jakob Friedrich Wanner. The same architect was responsible for the design of Zug station which was located on today's Bundesplatz and had a track triangle for turning trains.

The ZZL route ended at the Untergrund yard where it connected with the Lucerne–Emmenbrücke(–Olten) line opened by the SCB in 1859, which had to be used to reach Lucerne station, which also belonged to the SCB. The approach to Lucerne changed again to join at the new Fluhmühle yard in August 1875, when the line of the Bern-Lucerne Railway (Bern-Luzern-Bahn, BLB) from Langnau im Emmental was opened along with a new entrance to the station by the 317 metre-long Gibraltar tunnel.

=== Gotthard Railway connection ===
As the Swiss private railways were already in a weak financial situation, an economic crisis in the 1870s brought railway construction to a standstill. However, construction of the Gotthard Railway (Gotthardbahn, GB) commenced after 1869. The SCB and NOB established the Aargau Southern Railway (Aargauische Südbahn, ASB) to build an access route; this reached Rotkreuz station on the ZZL from Muri on 1 December 1881. On 1 June 1882, the ASB also opened the Brugg–Hendschiken(–Muri) and Rotkreuz–Immensee lines and the GB opened the Immensee–Arth-Goldau–Göschenen line, allowing continuous operations over the Gotthard.

The ASB allowed the SCB to operate direct movements via Olten and Aarau to Immensee to the provisional starting point of the Gotthard Railway and the NOB could also operate direct movements via Brugg. Trains running via the ZZL from Zurich and Zug had to reverse in Rotkreuz, but trains running from Lucerne could run directly on to the Gotthard Railway. The building of direct approaches from Zurich and Lucerne to the Gotthard Railway, namely the (Zurich–)Thalwil–Zug (NOB), the Zug–Arth-Goldau (GB) and the Lucerne–Immensee (GB) lines, was delayed. At their opening, the ZZL would lose its legal independence.

=== Gotthard Railway approach ===
On 1 January 1892, the ZZL was completely taken over by its parent company NOB. At the federal level, meanwhile, negotiations continued on the nationalisation of the private railways, the proposal to buy up the SCB had still not been formally discussed in 1891, but the number of advocates of a state railway company in the councils steadily increased.

On 1 November 1896, the SCB again changed the approach to Lucerne as part of the construction of the second Lucerne station; the platform area of the station was turned around 90 degrees to face south and the approach was rebuilt to run through two new tunnels, called Schönheim and Gütsch, allowing the removal of all level crossings in the city. After only 21 years of use, the Gibraltar Tunnel was made superfluous and was the third Swiss railway tunnel to be abandoned; until 1981 it was the longest abandoned railway tunnel in Switzerland.

The Gotthard Railway's access lines were finally completed on 1 June 1897, exactly 15 years after the opening of the Gotthard Railway. The Lucerne–Immensee line of the GB was introduced as a parallel line to the SCB with its own platform in Lucerne station.

In preparation for the opening of the Thalwil–Arth-Goldau railway by the NOB and GB, Zug station was relocated and a new station building was built—the old station building was moved to Wollishofen. The second station was built between the diverging lines and the wye junction was replaced by the so-called Zug loop. The Zug loop itself was closed in 1990 with the introduction of the Zurich S-Bahn.

Trains running via the ZZL line from Zurich entered the station via the loop from the north; it was possible to run towards Arth-Goldau or continue on the ZZL line to Lucerne. For the latter possibility, a parallel track between Chollermüli (Kollermühle) and Zug was opened on 18 December 1897 so that trains on the ZZL route could run from Cham via the southern track to the station, the loop and back by the northern track to Knonau (and vice versa), allowing Zug Station to be served.

In the course of 1897 the Federal Council also passed the so-called Repurchase Act (Rückkaufsgesetz) to be put to a referendum; this law, which was to form the basis of the Swiss Federal Railways (SBB), was put a referendum in 1898 and was adopted by a two-thirds majority. The nationalisation of the NOB took place formally on 1 January 1902; this included the transfer of the line of the former ZZL to the ownership of the SBB.

== Zurich–Affoltern am Albis–Zug railway ==
The Zurich–Affoltern am Albis–Zug railway runs through the former Knonaueramt (now the district of Affoltern), giving it the colloquial name of the Knonauer-Strecke (Knonau line). Its importance as an approach line to the Gotthard was lost with the opening of the Thalwil–Arth-Goldau railway in 1897. The direct Zurich–Lucerne trains now use the route via Thalwil, so that this branch of the line became a secondary line without through traffic. With the introduction of the Zurich S-Bahn, the line has been somewhat revived and some improvements have been made as a result of increasing passenger traffic.

== Zug–Lucerne railway ==
The line between Zug and Lucerne has not been fully developed to two tracks. Above all, the single-track section along the Rotsee and the single-track Friedtal Tunnel and the subsequent single-track Reus Bridge, are now considered bottlenecks. Various variants are currently being tested for the upgrade of these sections in connection with the redevelopment of Lucerne station.

The Baar Zug-Schutzengel section was significantly upgraded for the introduction of the Zug S-Bahn.
