= Swiss Northeastern Railway =

Swiss railway company

Swiss Northeastern Railway (Note: This name is commonly used in English language sources e.g. Mieg and Oevermann (2014), p. 80; Maw & Dredge, Vol. 13 (1872), p. 258; and Jung (2022).)
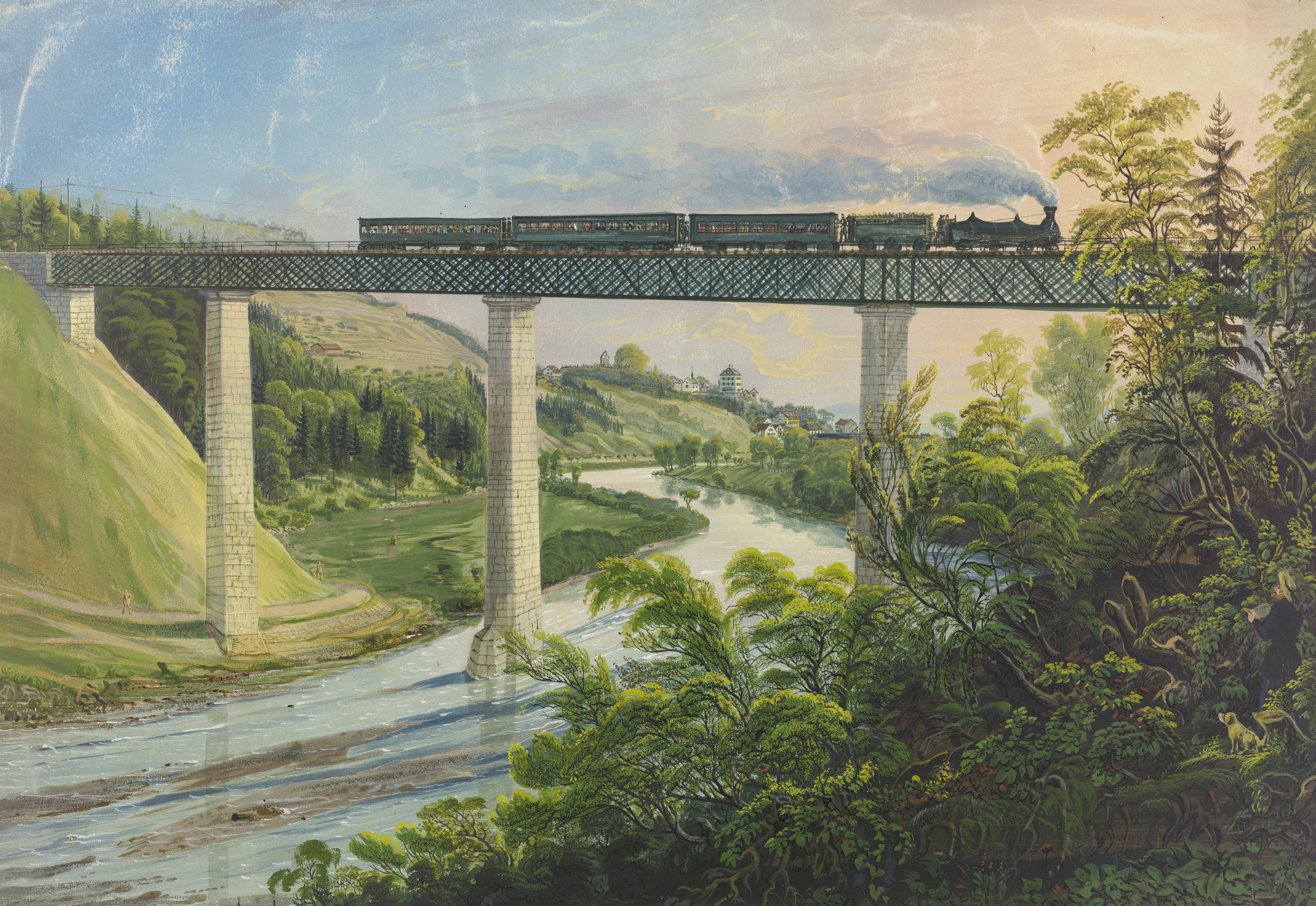
- Iron bridge across the Thur, built in 1856/7 as part of the line between Winterthur and Schaffhausen which was put into service in 1857 (lithograph from 1857)

Overview
- Native name: Schweizerische Nordostbahn

History
- Opened: 1 July 1853
- Closed: 1 January 1902

Technical
- Track gauge: 1,435 mm (4 ft 8 1/2 in) standard gauge

The Swiss Northeastern Railway (Schweizerische Nordostbahn; NOB) was an early railway company in Switzerland. It also operated shipping on Lake Constance (Bodensee) and Lake Zürich. Until the merger of the Western Swiss Railways into the Jura–Simplon Railway (JS) in 1890/91, it was the largest Swiss railway company.

== History ==
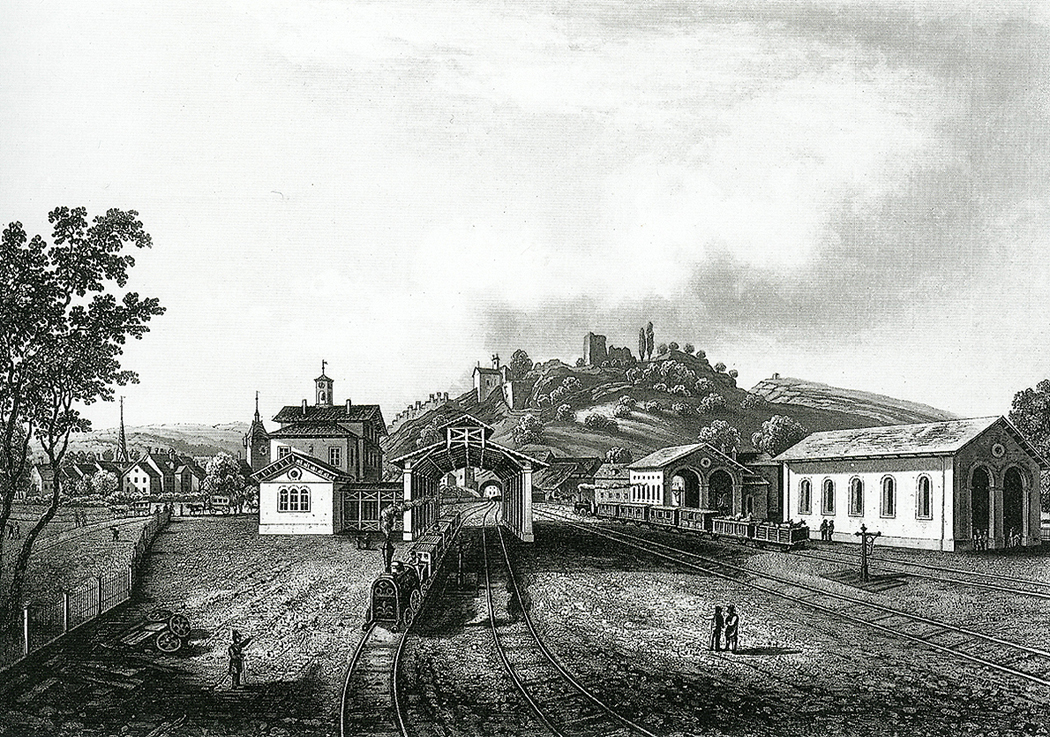
Baden station in about 1850

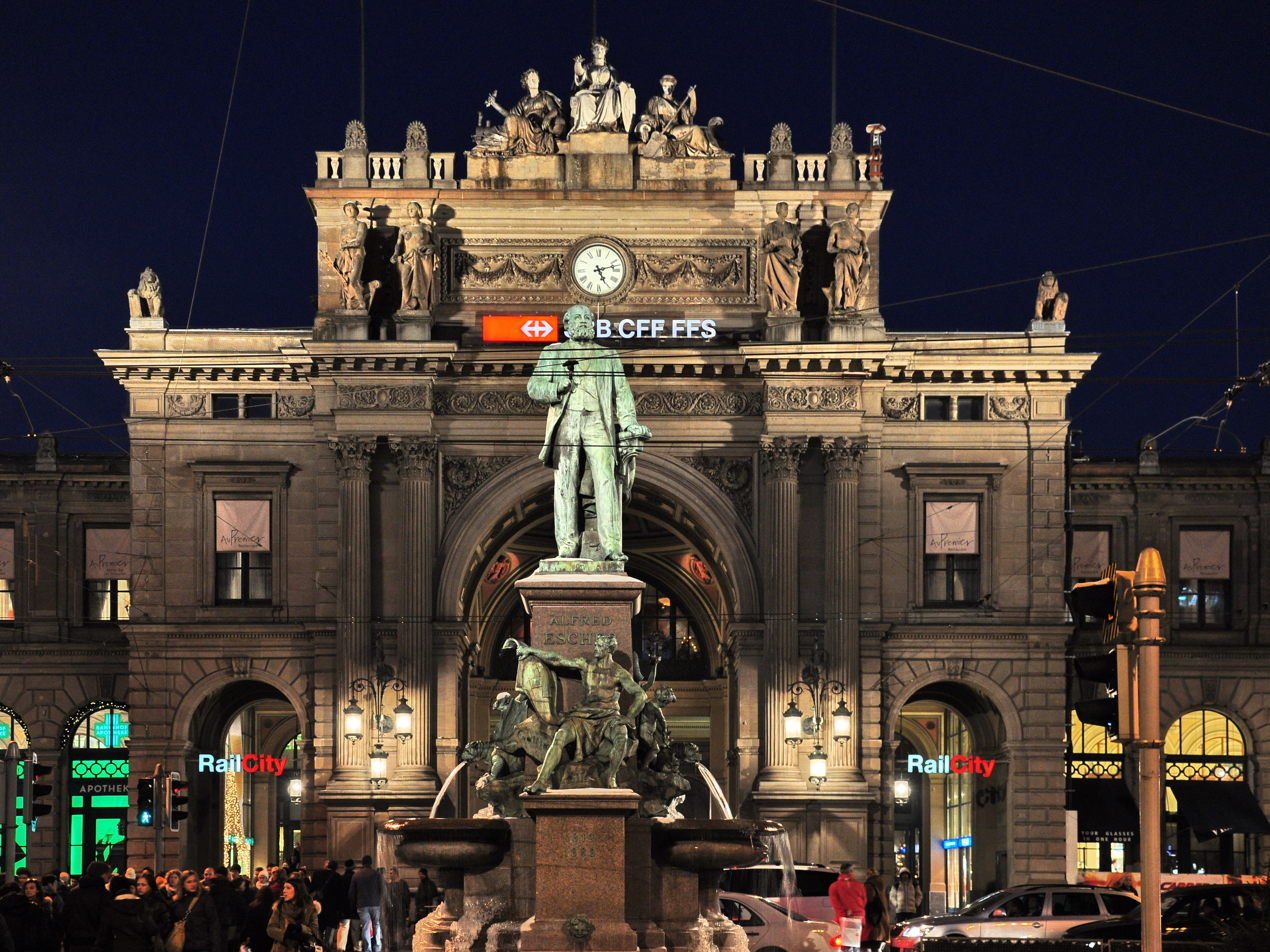
Alfred Escher memorial by Richard Kissling in front of Zürich Hauptbahnhof

The Swiss Northeast Railway was created on 1 July 1853 by the merger of the Swiss Northern Railway (Schweizerische Nordbahn—SNB— informally known as the Spanisch-Brötli-Bahn), and the Zürich-Lake Constance Railway (Zürich-Bodenseebahn). The originally planned continuation of the Northern Railway from Baden to Basel initially failed due to the different interests of the cantons of Zürich, Aargau and Basel.

The main initiator of the merger were the Zürich-based businessman Alfred Escher, who previously headed the Zürich-Lake Constance Railway, and economist Bruno Hildebrand. They advocated the funding of the railways by private investors instead of public funds and suggested the founding of Schweizerische Kreditanstalt to meet the large capital requirements of the railways.

The NOB endeavored to establish connections with foreign countries to generate freight traffic. It first opened a direct connection from Zürich to Lake Constance. Thus it became a direct competitor of the United Swiss Railways (Vereinigte Schweizerbahnen; VSB) based in St. Gallen. the NOB opened the line from Romanshorn to Winterthur on 16 May 1855. The Zürich–Winterthur extension was opened in two stages from Winterthur to Oerlikon on 27 December 1855 and to Zürich on 26 June 1856; this gave a connection to the former Northern Railway between Zürich and Baden. The arrival of the railway caused the village of Romanshorn to grow into one of the most important transport hubs in eastern Switzerland. The NOB started a shipping service on Lake Constance in 1855. The train ferry service between Romanshorn and Friedrichshafen (Germany) was established in 1869. This led the NOB to expand the railway facilities and to construct the largest of the ports on Lake Constance (measured by area), which required the shore to be raised.

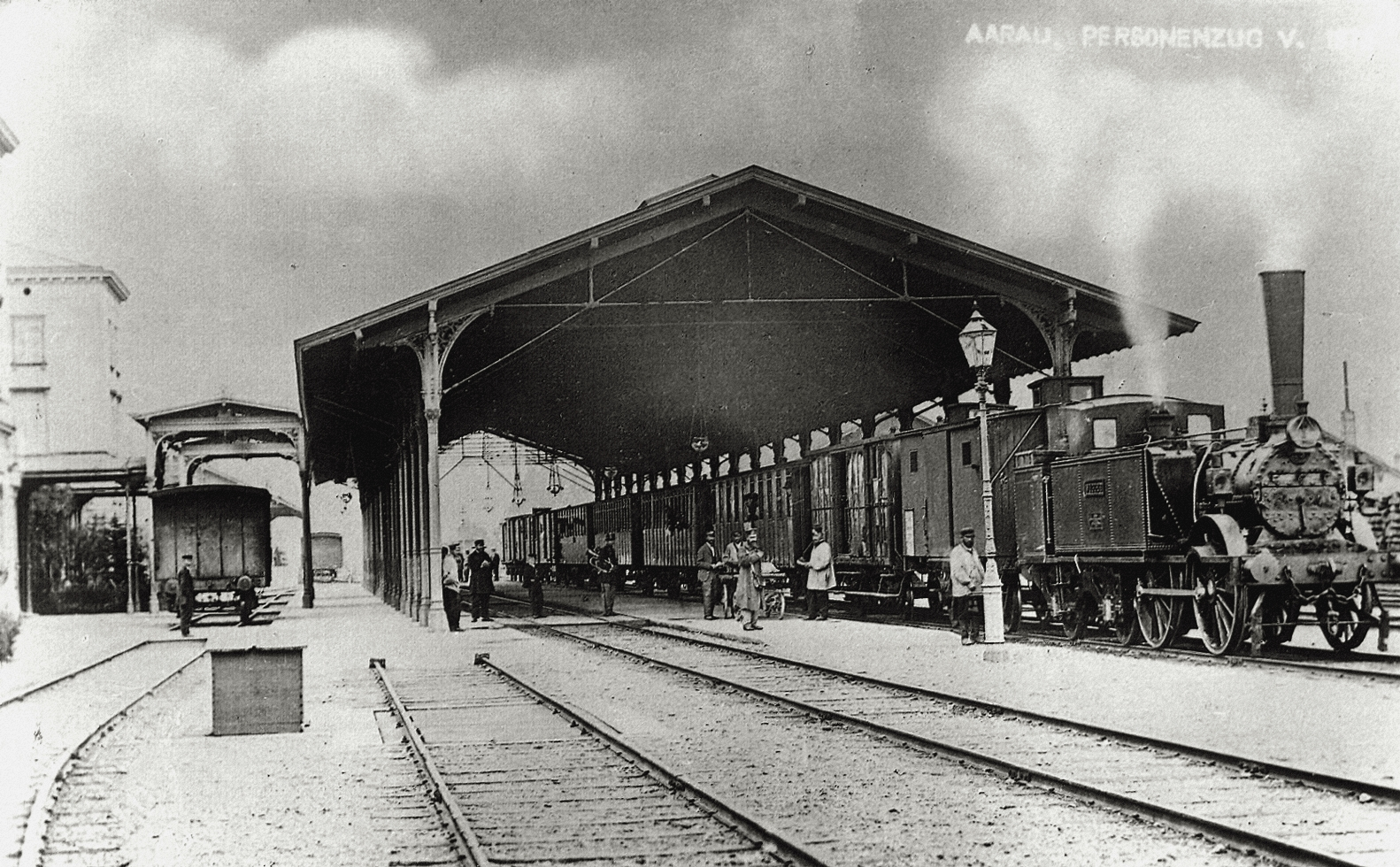
Aarau station with a waiting train of the SCB to Olten

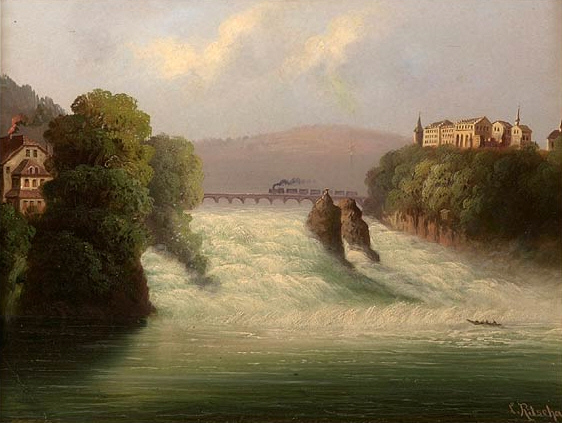
Rhine Fall Bridge and Laufen Castle in a painting by Hubert Sattler

The NOB started work on the Winterthur–Schaffhausen railway in 1856 and it was opened on 16 April 1857. The line of the former Northern Railway between Zürich and Baden was extended to the west. The section of the Baden–Aarau railway from Baden to Brugg with the bridge over the Reuss was opened on 29 September 1856. The rest of the line to Aarau was opened on 15 May 1858 where the network of NOB connected with the network of the Swiss Central Railway (Schweizerische Centralbahn; SCB) at Wöschnau on the Aargau-Solothurn canton border, meaning that Zürich was now connected with Basel.

On 18 August 1859, the NOB was able to complete a direct connection with a foreign country with the opening of the Turgi–Waldshut line. This completed the main network of Northeastern Railway. The most important northern gateway to Switzerland was Basel, but it was controlled by the SCB. Freight transport was NOB's most important business segment, which initially enjoyed good returns.

The NOB was involved with other railway companies. After the Schweizerische Ostwestbahn (Swiss East West Railway, OWB), which had been founded in 1861, had become bankrupt in an attempt to build a line from La Neuveville via Bern and Lucerne to Zürich, the NOB together with the cantons of Zürich, Zug and Lucerne, took over part of its line and completed it as the Zürich–Zug–Lucerne Railway (ZZL), which was finished on 1 June 1864.

The NOB—like other railway companies at the time—aimed at short-term profit maximisation for private bankers. The bankers took offices in management and the board of directors to secure their profits. The rights of the other shareholders was undermined by the use of common stock. They gained exemption from tax and subsidies through political influence. Alfred Escher was not only Chairman of the NOB and Chairman of Kreditanstalt, but also a member of the Executive Council of Zürich and, for 34 years, the National Council. Maintenance was neglected and the assets of the railway company were run down. This had already created a crisis in 1857, which was intensified in 1867.

=== Railway crisis ===
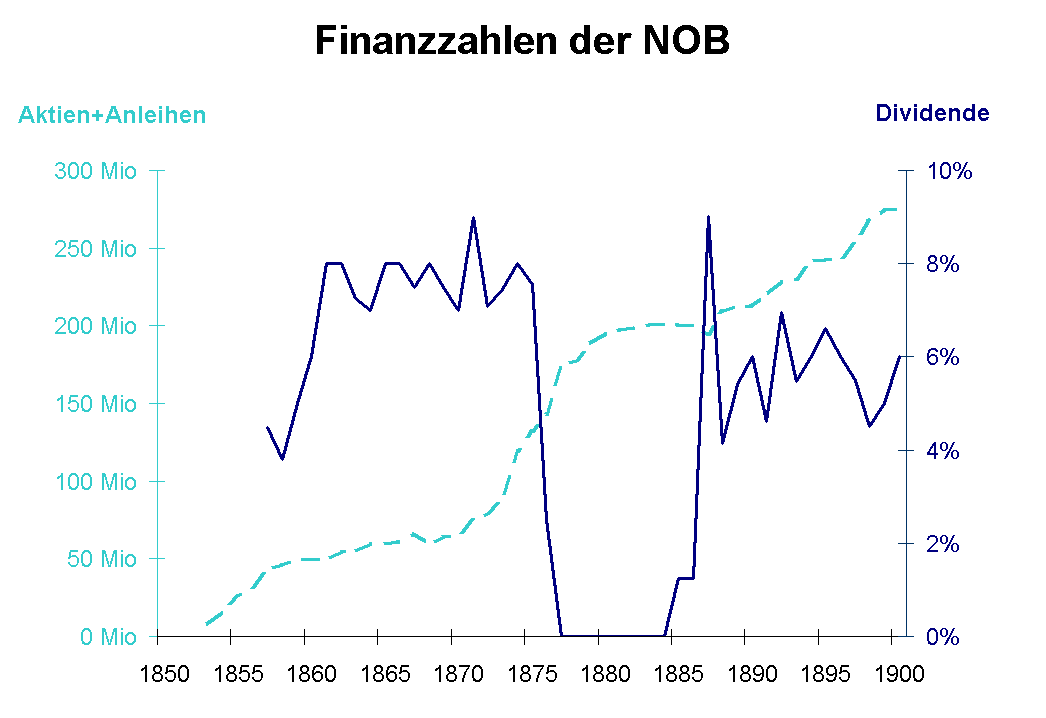
Share capital and fixed bonds (left scale) as well as dividends of NOB (right scale)

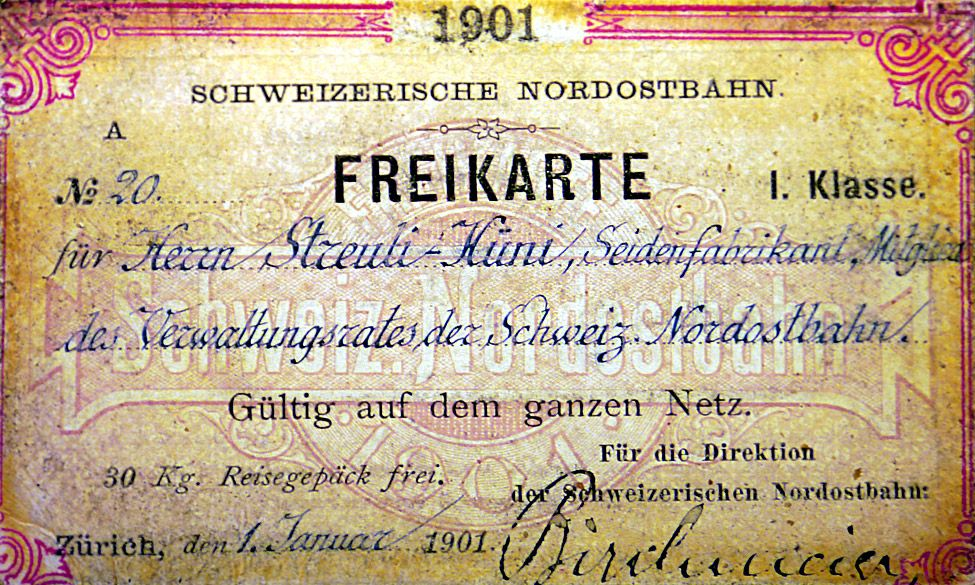
Free 1st class ticket of the NOB Board member Emil Streuli-Hüni

The behavior of the Zürich railway barons led the Swiss National Railway (Schweizerische Nationalbahn; SNB) to attempt to build a second rail link between Lake Geneva and Lake Constance to compete with the existing railway companies from 1872. As a defense measure, the NOB and SCB extended their existing networks between 1873 and 1882. The two companies founded the Aargau Southern Railway (Aargauische Südbahn) and the Bötzberg Railway (German: Bötzbergbahn) with equal shareholdings. The former was built and opened between 1873 and 1882 the Rupperswil–Immensee railway line with a branch line from Hendschiken to Brugg, connecting the network of the NOB and the SCB with the Gotthard Railway in 1882. The Bötzberg Railway, operated by the NOB, opened the Brugg–Pratteln railway in 1875, which together with the existing lines of the NOB and the SCB created a direct connection from Zurich to Basel.

In addition, the NOB under the new CEO Friedrich Peyer im Hof, tried to eliminate the competition in advance by an accelerated expansion of its own network. It secured concessions for various railway lines and entered into commitments with cantons and founding committees for the construction of these unprofitable lines. This forced the NOB to borrow money, which led to massive indebtedness. The financial difficulties brought the NOB to the brink of collapse. The construction of the Lake Zürich right-bank line, which it had begun in 1873, had to be discontinued because of the financial crisis. The important Lake Zürich left-bank railway to Ziegelbrücke, however, was opened in 1875. The NOB could not pay dividends for years from 1877. The price of its shares collapsed from Swiss Francs (CHF) 670 in 1871 to CHF 53 in 1879. An investigation commissioned by the General Assembly found grave mistakes in corporate governance.

On 2 March 1877, the NOB requested that the Federal Council release it from its obligations to build railways. On 14 February 1878, the Federal Assembly confirmed an agreement that the construction obligations would be maintained, but would be deferred until the completion of the NOB's financial restructuring. The construction period for the so-called "moratorium lines" (Thalwil–Zug, Etzwilen–Schaffhausen, Bülach–Schaffhausen, Koblenz–Stein, Dielsdorf–Niederweningen and the Lake Zurich right bank line) was extended. An agreement with the canton of Glarus set the date for the completion of the Glarus–Linthal line at 1 May 1879. The payment of dividends was suspended from 1880 to 1883. On 25 October 1887, the Federal Council instructed the NOB to begin construction of the Lake Zurich right bank line. The deadlines for the remaining moratorium lines were set on 27 June 1888.

The ruinous competitive project of the National Railway ended in insolvency. The participating towns and municipalities had to suffer decades of debt. The NOB took over the network of its rival for a fraction of its construction cost on 1 October 1880. The Zofingen–Suhr section was resold to the SCB.

=== Recovery and nationalisation ===
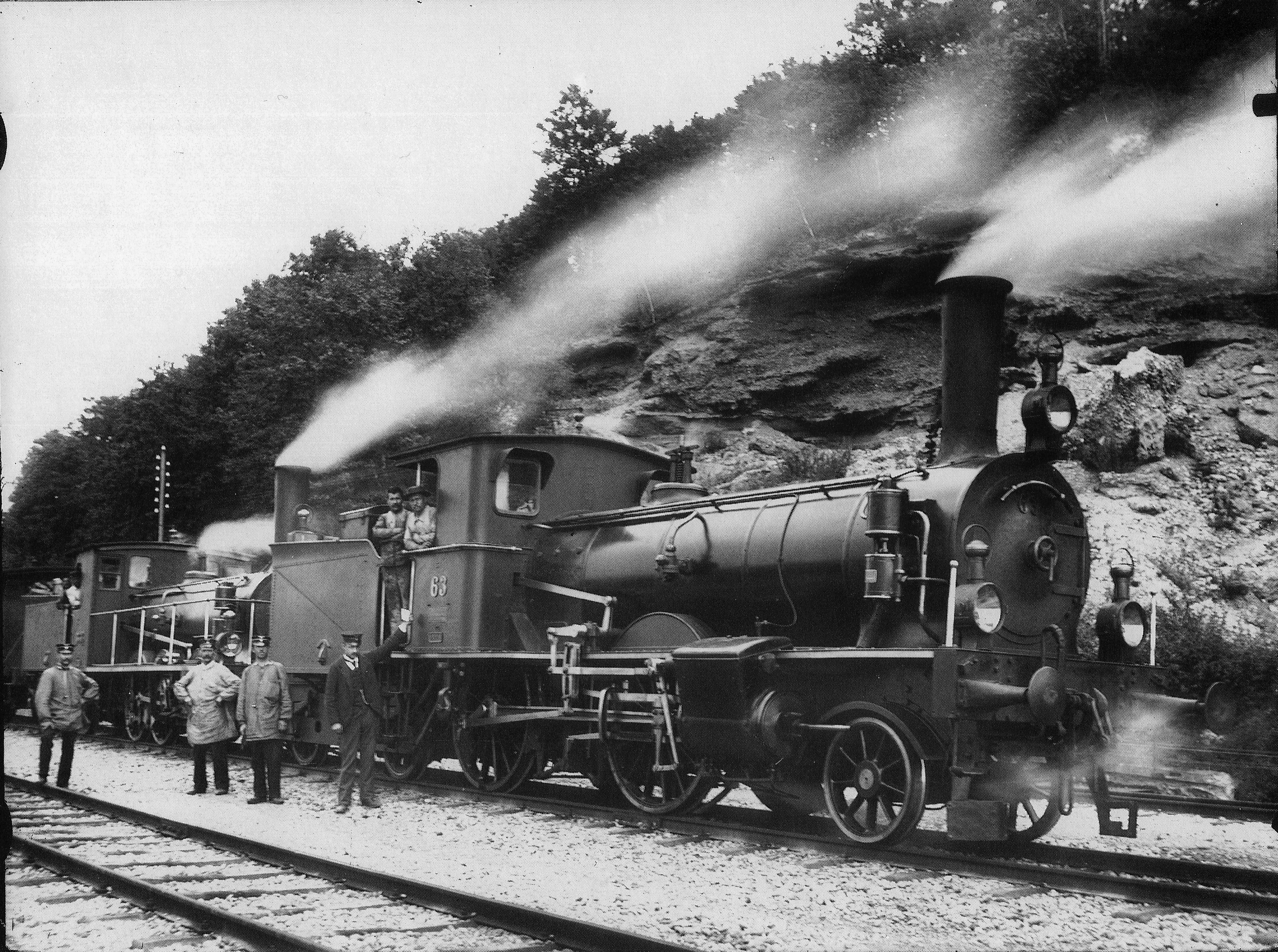
Due to increasing traffic, additional rolling stock had to be procured. Tender locomotive No. 63 supplied by SLM in 1894

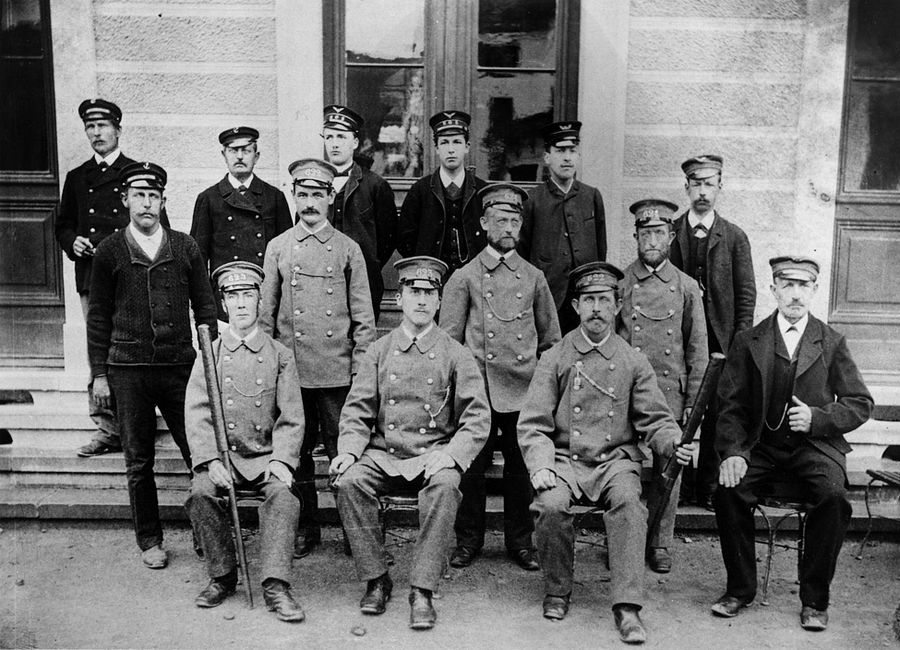
Staff went on strike in support of wage claims in 1897. Employees of Horgen station in about 1890.

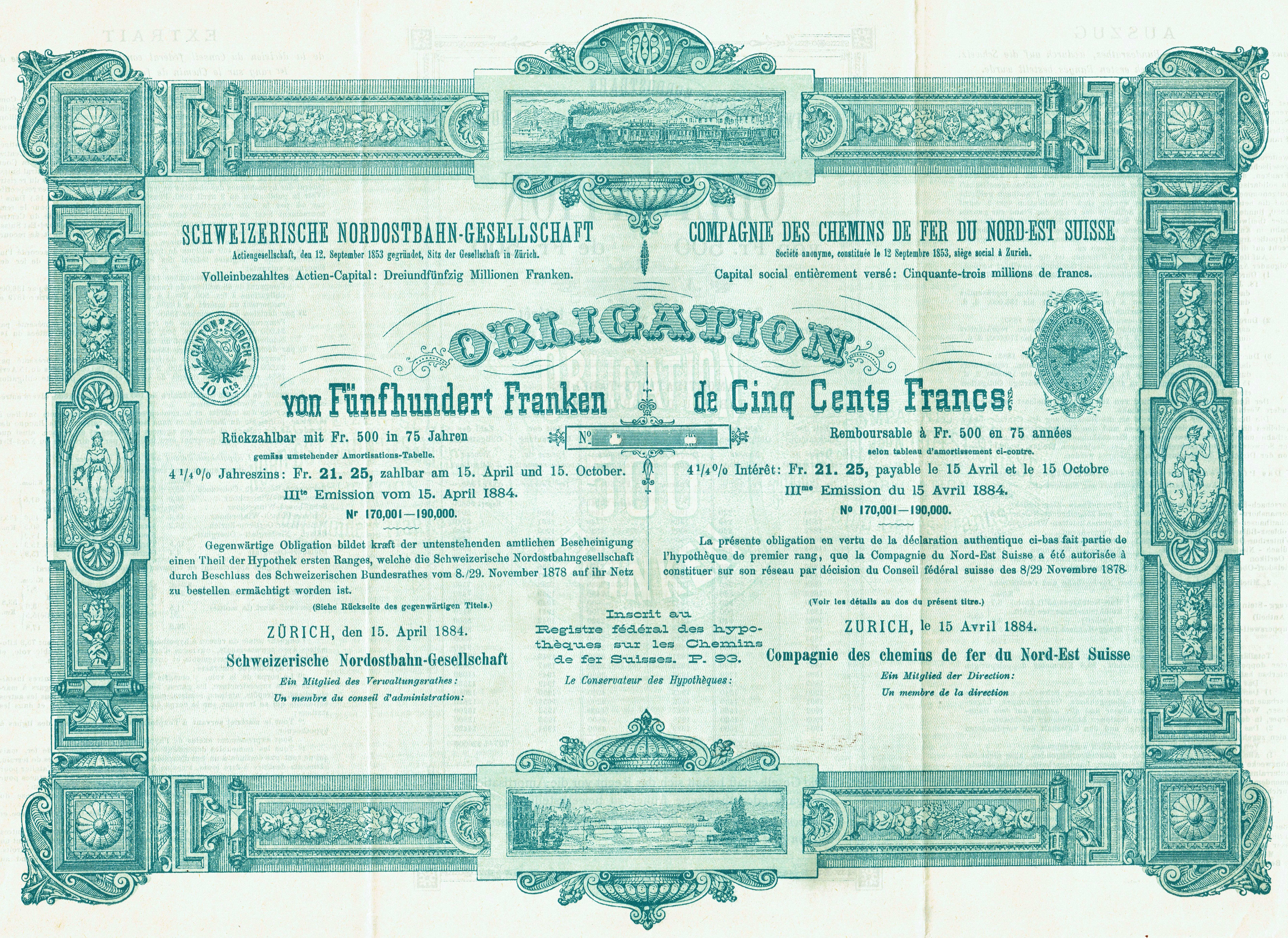
Bond of the Swiss Northeast Railway Company worth CHF 500 of 15 April 1884

The situation of the NOB slowly improved again after 1880. Increasing traffic led to the extension of stations and the procurement of additional rolling stock. After Alfred Escher's death in 1882, Adolf Guyer-Zeller became head of the NOB.

The railway crisis had caused many domestic shareholders to sell their securities to major foreign shareholders. Railway shares played a major role in speculation on the stock exchange. A financial group led by Adolf Guyer was able to secure a majority of votes at a general meeting of the company, allowing it to select the board of directors and replace it with people who would cooperate with its interests.

The vast majority of the shares were in foreign hands, the majority of the bonds belonged to Swiss owners. At the time, the interest rate was 4% for secure Swiss rail bonds. In order to increase the return of the shares, bonds were converted into shares with an interest rate of 3½%. This reduced the company's interest burden and increased profits.

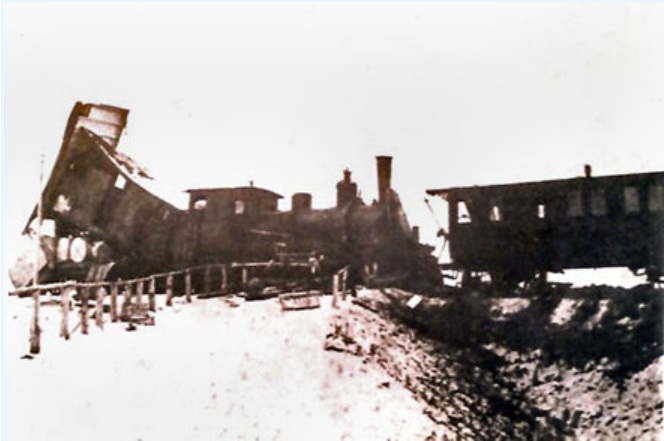
Clash at Seebach on 8 January 1885

On 8 January 1885, a Winterthur–Zürich train ran into a train coming from Wettingen after passing a stop signal. The train from Wettingen was pushed back from Seebach over the junction on the open track towards Zurich. The accident caused seven casualties and major property damage. An NOB passenger train hit a group of Central Railway workers, which had been busy with track work, at the southern exit from Gütsch tunnel near Lucerne on 30 May 1898. Seven railway workers were killed immediately and four seriously injured. On 4 June 1899, the Zurich–Geneva night express of the NOB ran past a designated stopping point in Aarau and ran into two stationary Central Railway locomotives. The accident caused two deaths and three serious injuries.

Labour regulations and the wage demands of railway workers, which the other private railways acceded to in 1896, met with resistance from the profit-oriented NOB. This led to a labour dispute with NOB staff in 1897. In Zurich, masses of passengers wrote in the complaints book. At times, milk was scarce. The 5000 employees were able to enforce their claims after 41 hours of strikes. The industrial action at the NOB contributed to the holding of a referendum in 1898, which approved the nationalisation of the largest private railways.

The NOB with a route network of 853 km and the Swiss Lake Constance fleet passed into the possession of the Swiss Federal Railways (SBB) on 1 January 1902.

== Shipping companies ==
Shipping was the natural continuation of the railway lines that ended at the lakes. The transport of the passengers was not difficult. The transport of goods, however, was much more complicated and expensive because the goods had to be reloaded twice.

=== Lake Constance ===
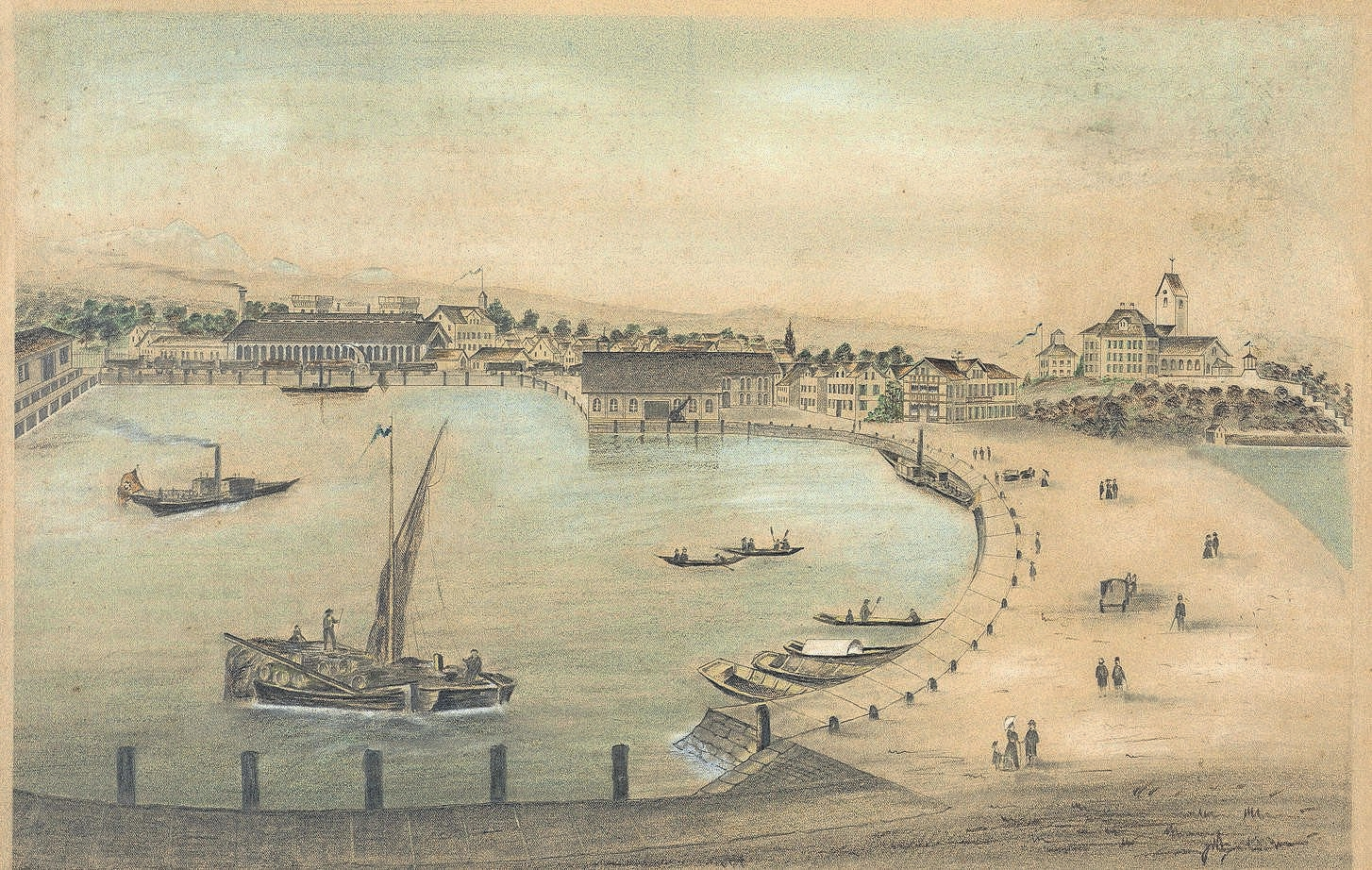
Romanshorn harbour with station hall about 1860 with mole and warehouse.

The Lake Constance (Bodensee) route was the most important trade route for traffic between Switzerland and Germany. The Rhine only became navigable to Basel in 1904. The NOB started operating shipping services on Lake Constance with the Thurgau and the Stadt Zürich in 1855. The NOB merged with the Schweizerischen Dampfboot-Aktiengesellschaft für den Rhein und Bodensee (Swiss Steamboat Corporation for the Rhine and Lake Constance) on 1 January 1857. It was founded in 1850 in Schaffhausen as a cantonal enterprise and in the following four years put into service the steamships Stadt Schaffhausen, Rhein, Stadt St. Gallen and Bodan. In 1863, shipping operations on the Rhine were discontinued and the four steamships were relocated to Romanshorn.

On 11 March 1861 the steamer Stadt Zürich rammed and sank the Bavarian steamer Ludwig. Three persons survived, 13 were killed. On 12 February 1864 the Bavarian steamer Jura was also rammed and sunk by the Stadt Zürich.

In order to avoid the reloading of goods, the Bavarian and the Württemberg steamship administration together with the NOB decided in 1867 to transport railway wagons by train ferry. A steam ferry known as "steam ferry I" was used on the Friedrichshafen–Romanshorn route. This over 70 metre-long ferry was able to accommodate 18 freight wagons, but had a horrendous rate of coal consumption. It was retired in 1882 and subsequently scrapped. A second ferry known as "steam ferry II" started operating between Lindau and Romanshorn in 1874.

In 1884, the flat-deck steamer Stadt Zürich was converted into the semi-private steamer Zürich. In 1887, the NOB put the newly built saloon steamer Helvetia III into service, which caused a sensation with its clipper bow and bowsprit. In 1892, the mixed steam/sailing ship Säntis replaced the Stadt Schaffhausen. The mixed steam/sailing ship St. Gotthard was similarly replaced by the flat-deck steamer Stadt St. Gallen in 1897.

In 1902, with the nationalisation of the NOB the entire shipping company was transferred to the Swiss Federal Railways (SBB).

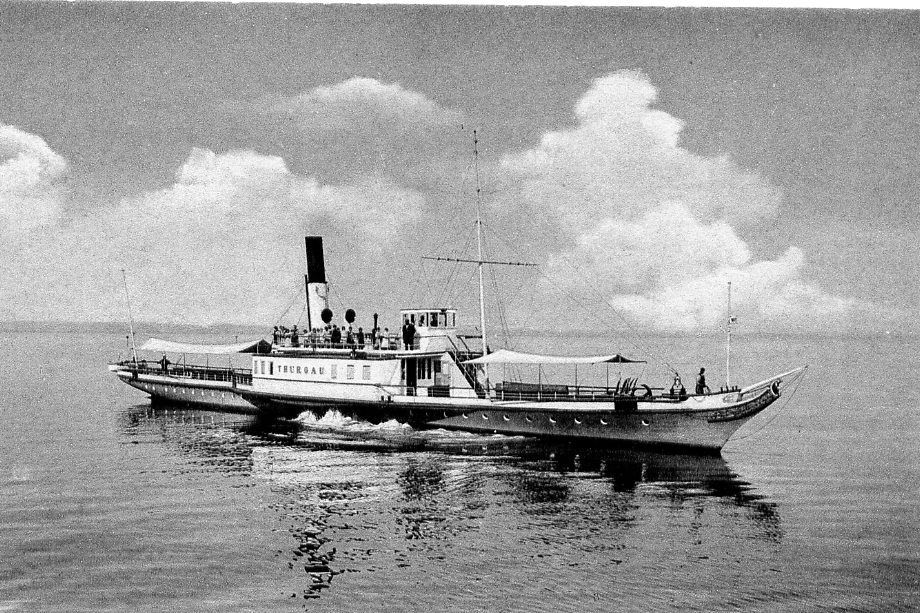
Flat-deck steamer Thurgau

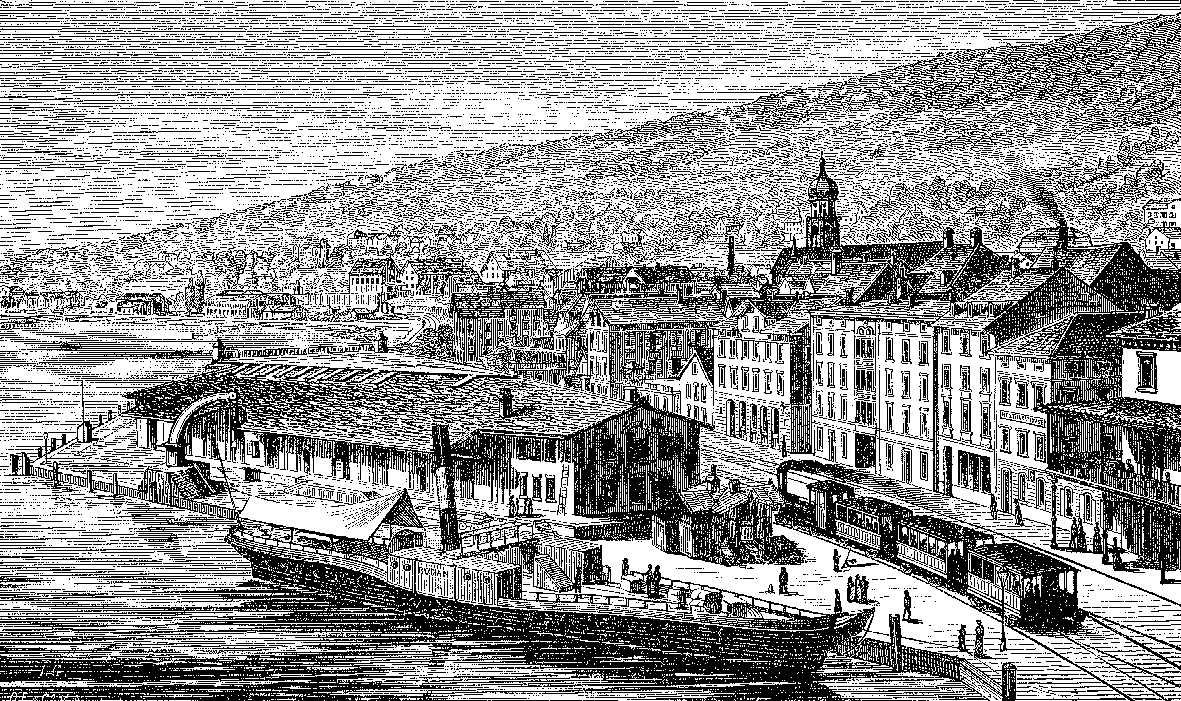
Flat-deck steamer Bodan in about 1880 in Rorschach

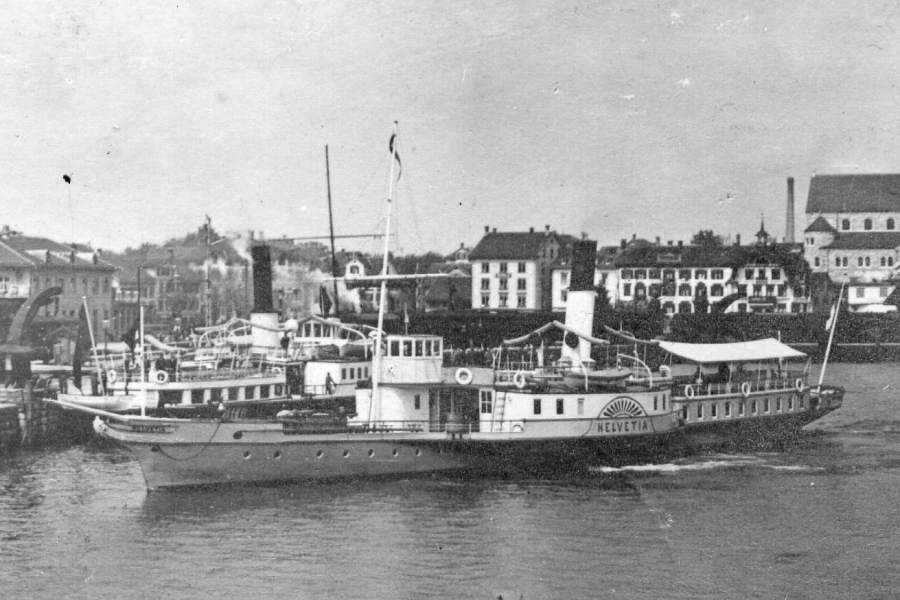
Steam/sailing ship Helvetia in Romanshorn

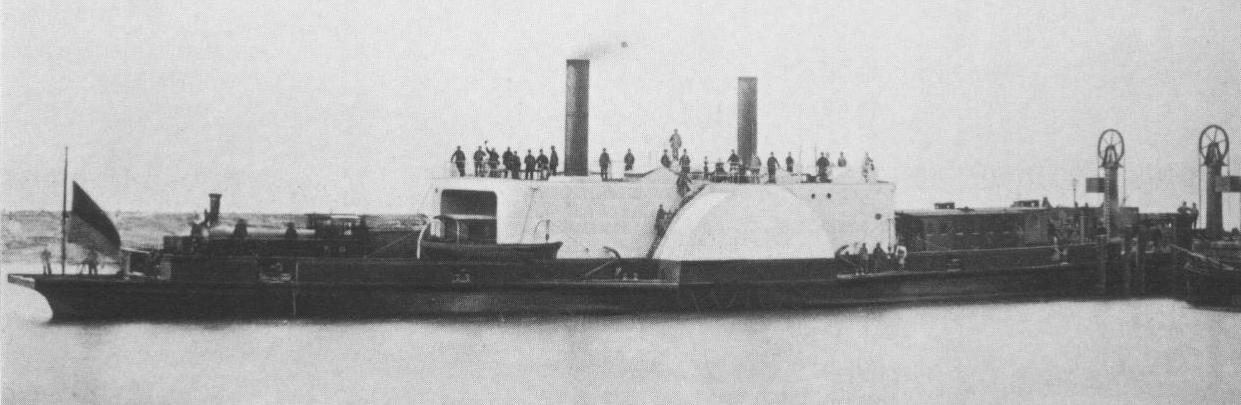
Stean train ferry I in Romanshorn harbour

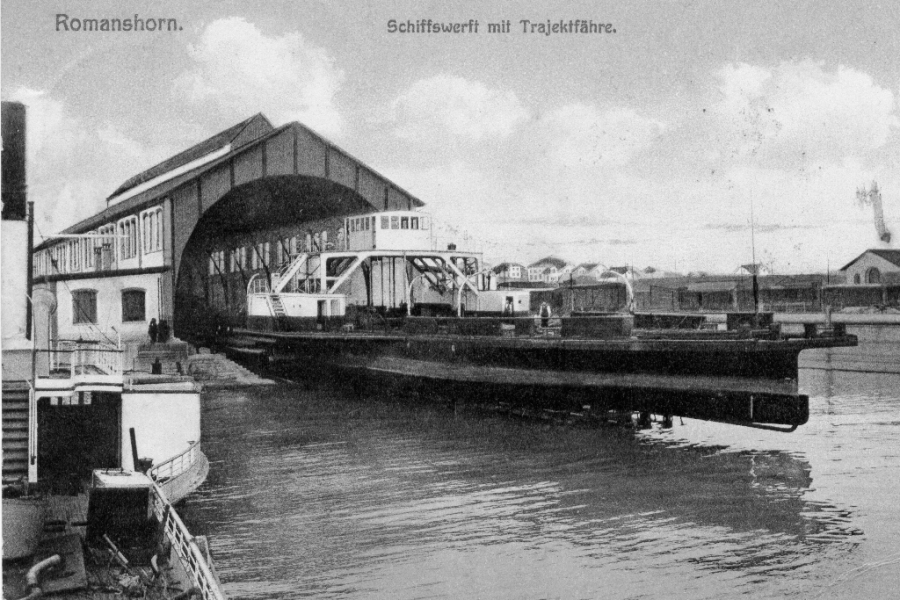
Stean train ferry II in the Romanshorn shipyard

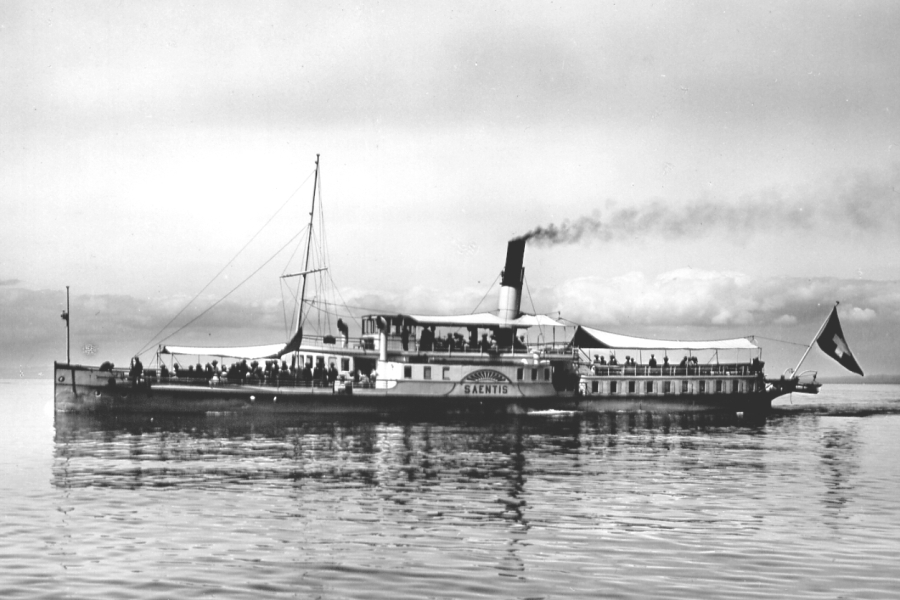
Steam/sailing ship Saentis

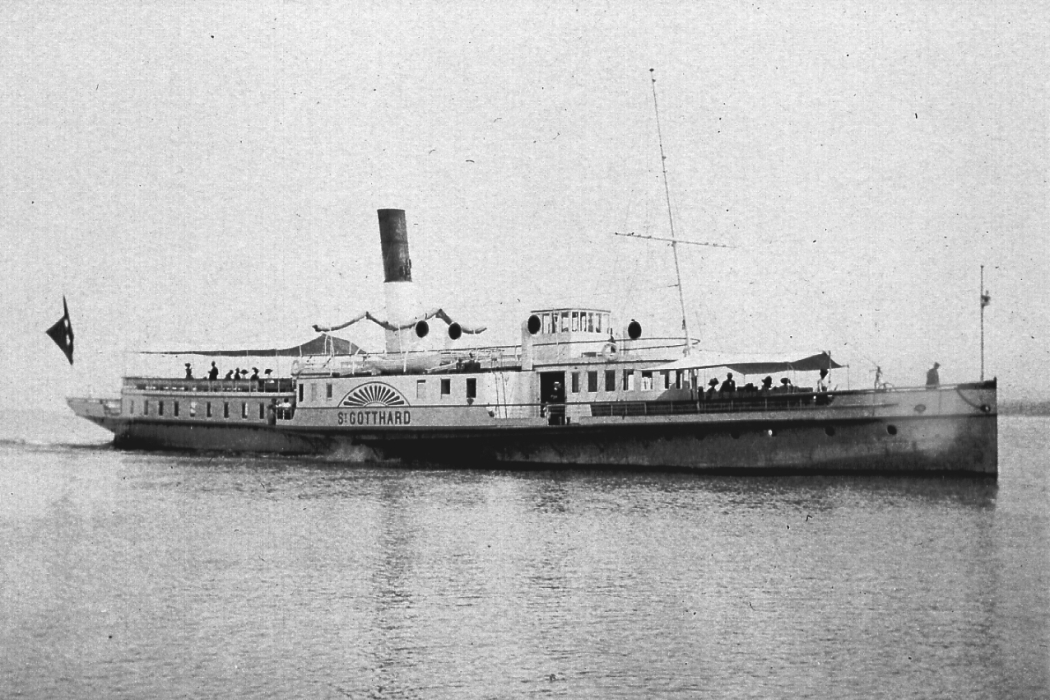
Steam/sailing ship St. Gotthard

=== Lake Zürich ===
In 1864, the Dampfbootgesellschaft linkes Ufer (Left Bank Steamboat Company) was established in Horgen. In 1868, it merged with the older Zürichsee-Walensee-Gesellschaft AG (Lake Zürich-Walensee Company) to form the Dampfbootgesellschaft für den Zürichsee (Steamboat Company for Lake Zürich). Shortly before the commissioning of the Lake Zürich left bank railway (Linksufrige Zürichseebahn), the NOB took over the entire shipping fleet in 1875. The NOB curtailed operations immediately so rival companies formed. When the Zürich–Meilen–Rapperswil railway started operation in 1894, the existing fleet of six ships: Helvetia, Concordia, Lukmanier, St. Gotthard, Taube and Schwalbe was reduced.

With the nationalisation of the NOB in 1903, shipping operations were outsourced. All public shipping services were taken over by the Zürichsee-Schifffahrtsgesellschaft (Lake Zürich Navigation Company; ZDG) in 1902. The paddle-wheel and screw steamers taken over from the NOB were replaced by more modern ships, with the exception of the Helvetia.

A train ferry operated on Lake Zurich only for a short time. The NOB put an unnamed train ferry built by Escher, Wyss & Cie. into operation in 1885. The traffic from the left bank transshipment port of Wollishofen to the right bank Uetikon was used practically exclusively for traffic to/from the local CU Chemie Uetikon chemical factory. Operations were discontinued with the opening of the Zürich–Meilen–Rapperswil railway in the autumn of 1894.

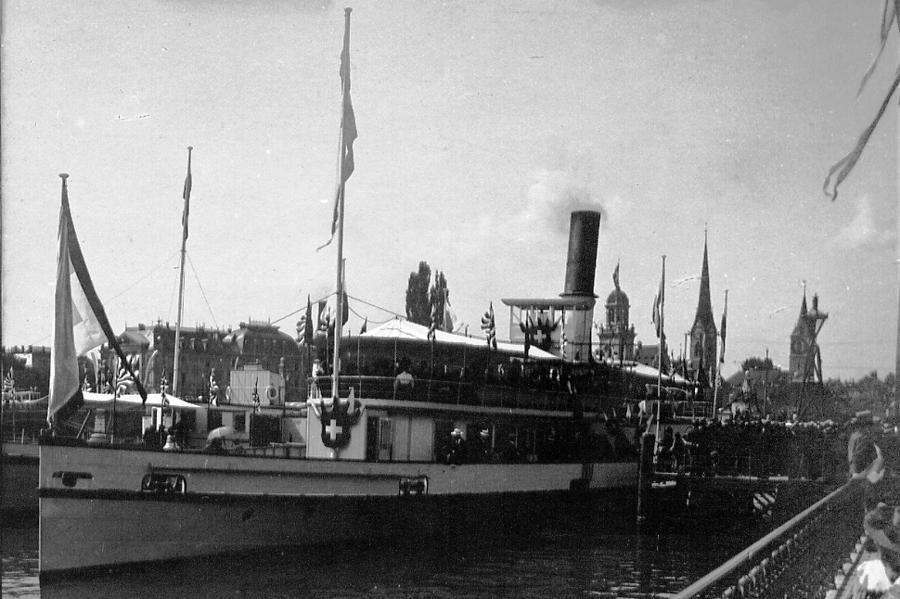
Helvetia, commissioned in 1875

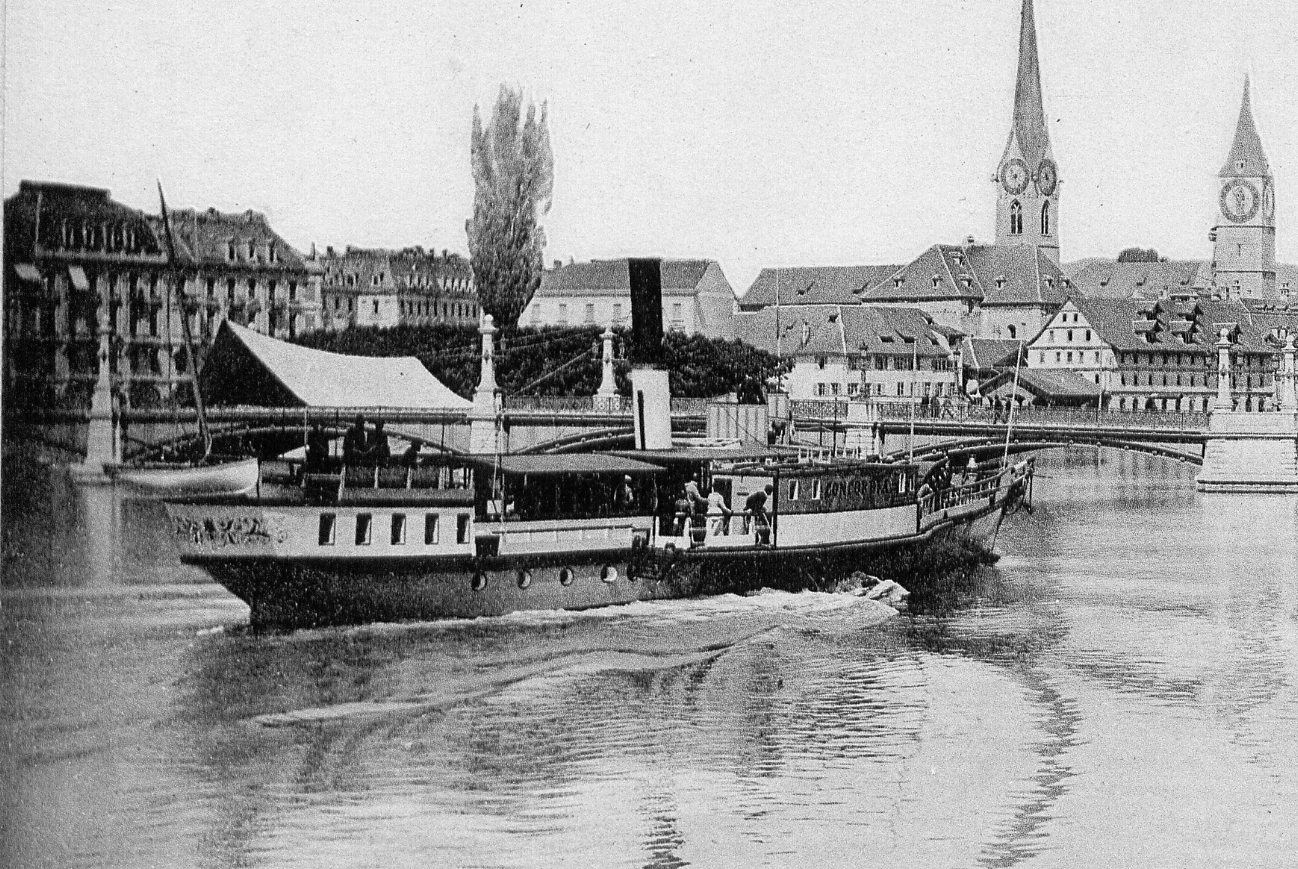
Concordia (1864) operating to the Zürich theatre.

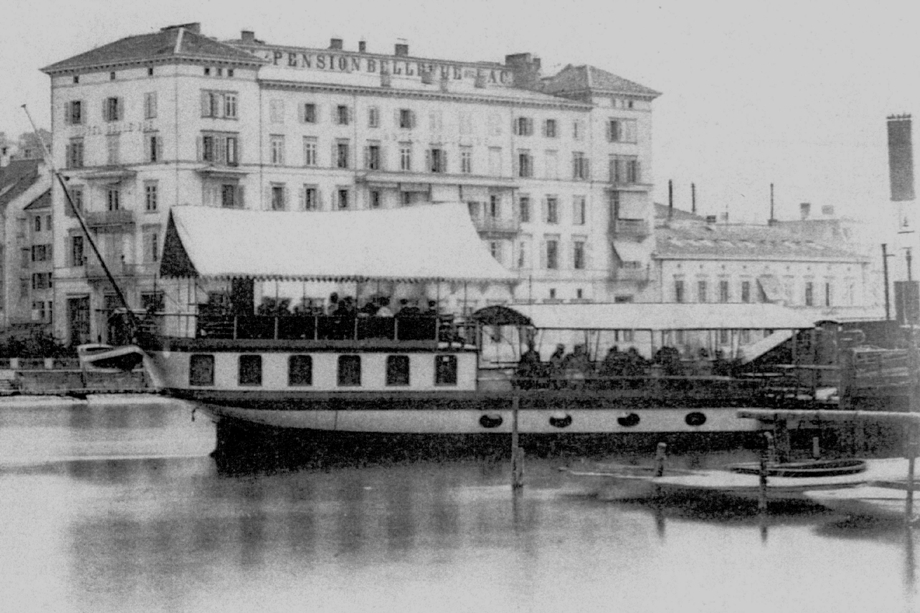
Rear of the St. Gotthard (1865)

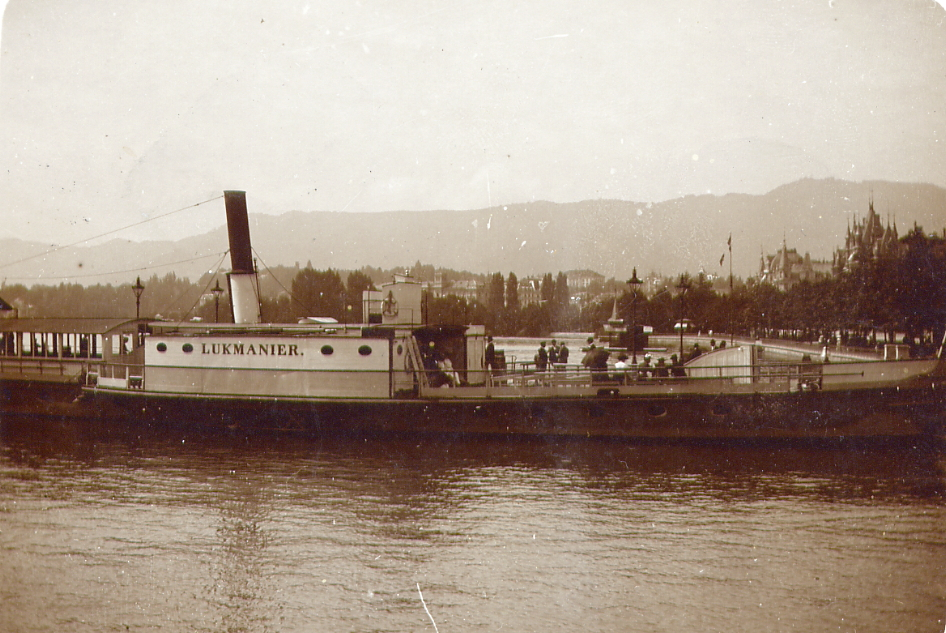
Lukmanier (1865), sister ship of the St. Gotthard

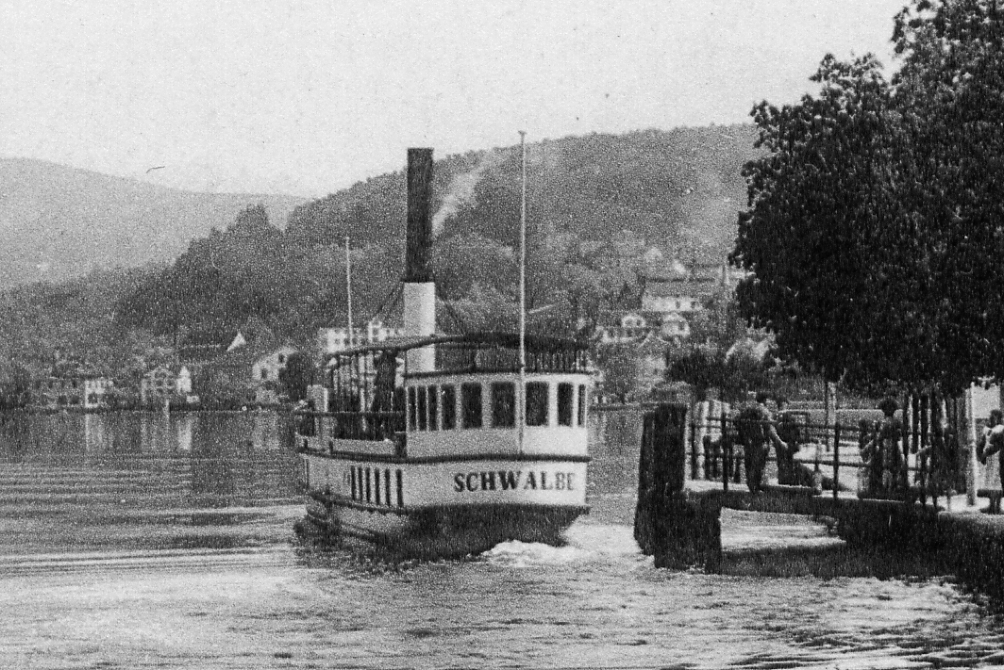
Schwalbe (1865), the first screw steamer on Lake Zurich

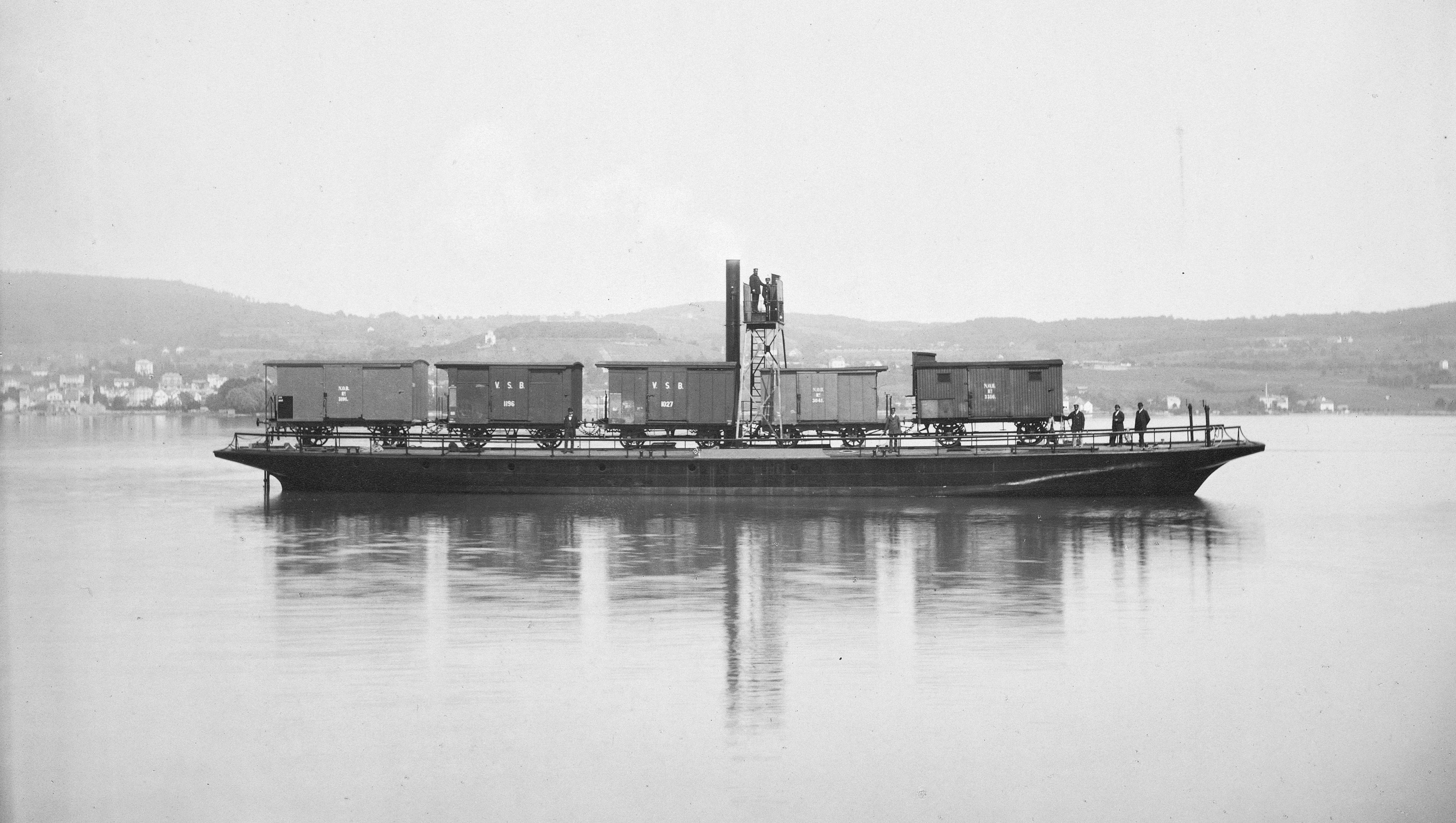
Unnamed train ferry, commissioned in 1885

== Route network ==
Swiss Northeastern Railway and Bözberg Railway 1897–1901

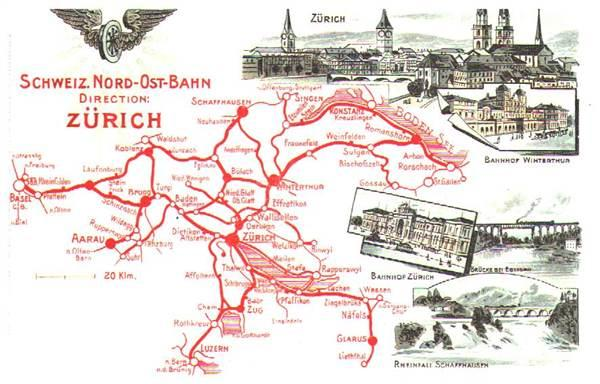
Postcard with route network of the NOB

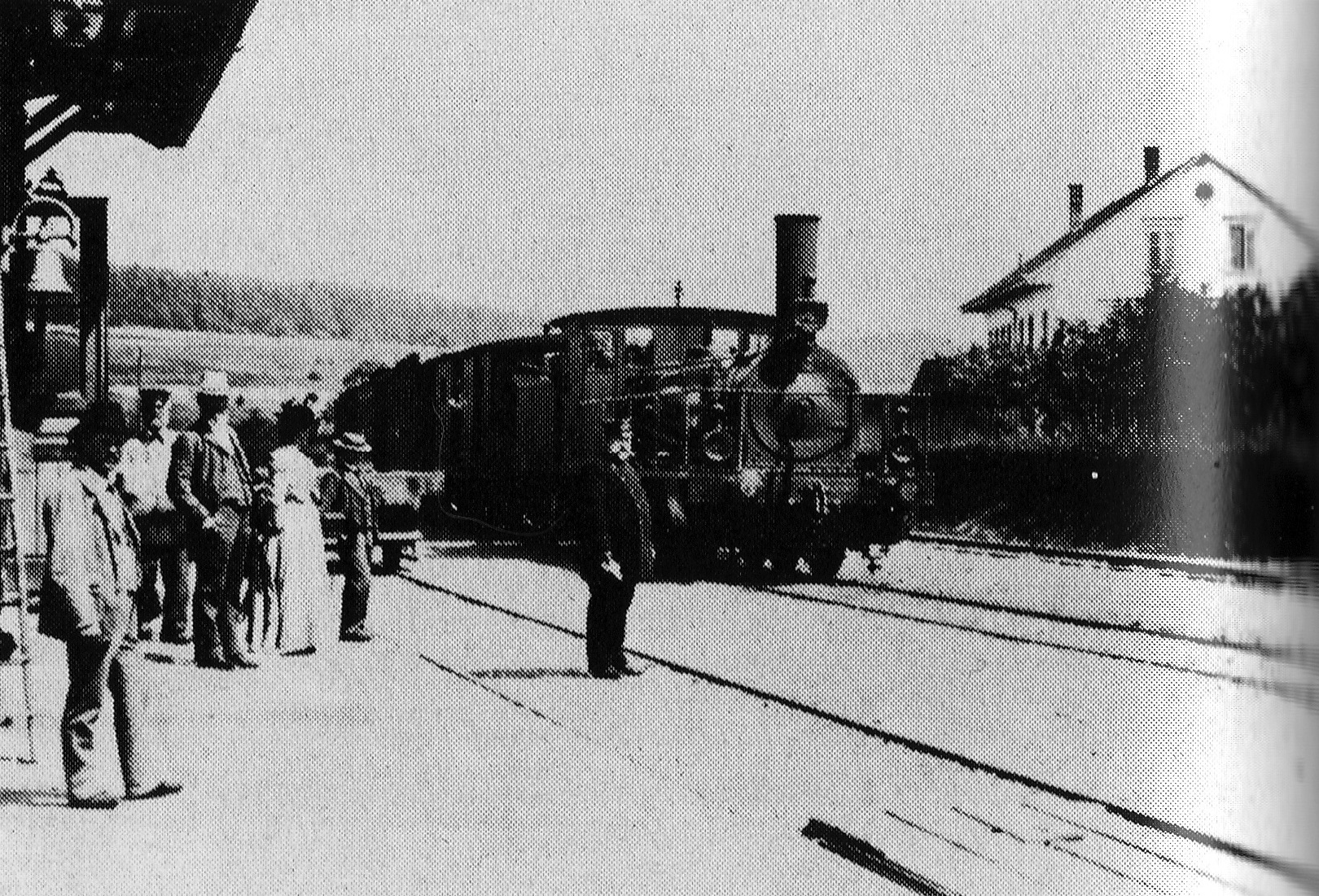
Entry of a train into Bassersdorf station shortly after the turn of the century

No.	Railway	Section	Opening	Duplicated	Remarks	Length
1.	Zürich–Turgi –Aarau –Wöschnau	Zürich–Baden	9 Aug. 1847	1861	Built by the Swiss Northern Railway (SNB), opened on 1 July 1853	49.551 km
1.	Zürich–Turgi –Aarau –Wöschnau	Baden–Turgi	29 Sept 1856	1861		49.551 km
1.	Zürich–Turgi –Aarau –Wöschnau	Turgi–Brugg AG	29 Sept 1856	1862		49.551 km
1.	Zürich–Turgi –Aarau –Wöschnau	Brugg AG–Aarau	15 May 1858	1862		49.551 km
1.	Zürich–Turgi –Aarau –Wöschnau	Aarau–Wöschnau	15 May 1858	16 July 1872	Connecting to the Central Railway (SCB) in Wöschnau	49.551 km
2.	Zürich–Winterthur –Romanshorn	Zürich–Oerlikon	26 June 1856	30 May 1860	Planned by the Zürich-Lake Constance Railway (Zürich-Bodenseebahn), opened on 1 July 1853	82.538 km
2.	Zürich–Winterthur –Romanshorn	Oerlikon–Wallisellen	27 Dec. 1855	30 May 1860	Planned by the Zürich-Lake Constance Railway (Zürich-Bodenseebahn), opened on 1 July 1853	82.538 km
2.	Zürich–Winterthur –Romanshorn	Wallisellen–Effretikon	27 Dec. 1855	1861	Planned by the Zürich-Lake Constance Railway (Zürich-Bodenseebahn), opened on 1 July 1853	82.538 km
2.	Zürich–Winterthur –Romanshorn	Effretikon–Winterthur	27 Dec. 1855	1862 (Note: Since the opening of the National Railway Effretikon–Wettingen line on 15 October 1877 a parallel track to its double track. Third track dismantled in 1880.)	Planned by the Zürich-Lake Constance Railway (Zürich-Bodenseebahn), opened on 1 July 1853	82.538 km
2.	Zürich–Winterthur –Romanshorn	Winterthur–Romanshorn	16 May 1855	–	Planned by the Zürich-Lake Constance Railway (Zürich-Bodenseebahn), opened on 1 July 1853	82.538 km
3.	Lake Line	Romanshorn–Rorschach	15 Oct. 1869	–	Rorschach Hafen–Rorschach: parallel track to the United Swiss Railways (Vereinigte Schweizerbahnen; VSB)	33.292 km
3.	Lake Line	Romanshorn–Kreuzlingen (Note: The former Kreuzlingen station is now called Kreuzlingen Hafen)–national border(–Konstanz)	1 July 1871	–	Rorschach Hafen–Rorschach: parallel track to the United Swiss Railways (Vereinigte Schweizerbahnen; VSB)	33.292 km
4.	Rheinfall railway (Winterthur–Neuhausen–Schaffhausen)		16 April 1857	–	Planned by the Rheinfallbahn, opened on 4 Nov. 1856	30.380 km
5.	Turgi–Koblenz–national border (–Waldshut)		18 Aug. 1859	–	Property of the Grand Duchy of Baden State Railway (BadStB) from the middle of the Rhine Bridge	15.509 km
6.	Lake Zürich left-bank railway (Zürich–Ziegelbrücke)	Zürich–Wiedikon	20 Sept. 1875	27 May 1897		55.824 km
6.	Lake Zürich left-bank railway (Zürich–Ziegelbrücke)	Wiedikon–Thalwil	20 Sept. 1875	1 June 1896		55.824 km
6.	Lake Zürich left-bank railway (Zürich–Ziegelbrücke)	Thalwil–Ziegelbrücke	20 Sept. 1875	–		55.824 km
7.	Ziegelbrücke–Linthal	Ziegelbrücke–Näfels	20 Sept. 1875	–	Näfels–Glarus line owned by the VSB, shared by NOB	19.688 km
7.	Ziegelbrücke–Linthal	Glarus–Linthal	1 June 1879	–	Näfels–Glarus line owned by the VSB, shared by NOB	19.688 km
8.	Winterthur–Bülach–Eglisau–Koblenz	Winterthur–Bülach	1 Aug. 1876	–		47/170 km
8.	Winterthur–Bülach–Eglisau–Koblenz	Bülach–Eglisau	1 Aug. 1876	1 June 1897 (Note: Double-track route opened simultaneously with the Eglisau–Neuhausen line)	Part of the Zürich–Bülach–Schaffhausen line	47/170 km
8.	Winterthur–Bülach–Eglisau–Koblenz	Eglisau–Koblenz	1 Aug. 1876	–		47/170 km
9.	(Zürich-) Oerlikon–Oberglatt–Bülach		1 May 1865	–	Built by the Bülach-Regensberg-Bahn (BR), opened on 1 Jan. 1877	15.945 km
10.	Wehntal Railway	Oberglatt–Dielsdorf	1 May 1865	–	Built by the Bülach-Regensberg-Bahn (BR), opened on 1 Jan. 1877	10.750 km
10.	Wehntal Railway	Dielsdorf–Niederweningen	12 Aug. 1891 (Note: Moratorium line; the obligation to construct it was postponed in 1878)	–		10.750 km
11.	Bülach–Baden railway (Niederglatt–Otelfingen–Wettingen)		1 Oct. 1877	–		18.293 km
12.	Winterthur–Etzwilen –Singen		17 July 1875	–	Built by Swiss National Railway (SNB), taken over on 1 Oct. 1880	43.961 km
13.	Etzwilen–Emmishofen–Konstanz and Emmishofen–Kreuzlingen		17 July 1875	–	Built by Swiss National Railway (SNB), taken over on 1 Oct. 1880	30.099 km
14.	Effretikon–Kloten–Oerlikon–Seebach–Otelfingen (–Wettingen)		15 Oct. 1877	–	Built by the National Railway (parallel with the Otelfingen–Wettingen line of the NOB), taken over by NOB on 1 June 1880; second track on Otelfingen–Wettingen line dismantled in 1882.	27.207 km
15.	Wettingen–Lenzburg–Suhr	Wettingen–Baden Oberstadt	15 Oct. 1877	–	Built by the National Railway, taken over on 1 June 1880	23.249 km
15.	Wettingen–Lenzburg–Suhr	Baden Oberstadt–Suhr	6 Sept. 1877	–	Built by the National Railway, taken over on 1 June 1880	23.249 km
16.	Suhr–Aarau		6 Sept. 1877		Built by the National Railway, taken over on 1 June 1880 by the NOB together with the SCB	1.752 km
17.	Sulgen–Gossau railway (Sulgen–Gossau)		1 Feb. 1876	–	Built by the Bischofszellerbahn (SG), taken over on 1 Aug. 1885	22.670 km
18.	Effretikon–Wetzikon–Hinwil		17 Aug. 1876	–	Built by the Effretikon–Pfäffikon–Hinwil Railway Company (EH), taken over on 1 Jan. 1886	22.157 km
19.	Zürich Altstetten–Kollermühle–Zug and Kollermühle–Untergrund (Note: The former Untergrund crossing loop is now called Gütsch.)(–Lucerne)		1 June 1864	–	Built by the Zürich–Zug–Lucerne Railway (ZZL), opened on 1 Jan. 1892	62.550 km
20.	Lake Zürich right-bank railway line (Zürich–Rapperswil)	Stadelhofen–Rapperswil	15 March 1894	–		34.359 km
20.	Lake Zürich right-bank railway line (Zürich–Rapperswil)	Zürich–Stadelhofen	1 Oct. 1894	–		34.359 km
21.	Etzwilen–Schaffhausen	Etzwilen–Feuerthalen	1 Nov. 1894	–		16.248 km
21.	Etzwilen–Schaffhausen	Feuerthalen–Schaffhausen	2 April 1895	–		16.248 km
22.	(Bülach-) Eglisau–Neuhausen (-Schaffhausen)		1 June 1897	–	Running through German territory between Rafz and Neuhausen	16.248 km
23.	Thalwil–Zug		1 June 1897	–	The Zug–Arth-Goldau extension, which was opened simultaneously, belonged to the Gotthard Railway (GB).	17.049 km
	Total (1901)			94.202 km (14%)		697.453 km
Routes shared with other railways:
1.	Bötzberg Railway (BöB)	Pratteln–Stein-Säckingen	2 Aug. 1875	24 March 1895	NOB and SCB (operated by the NOB)	47.970 km
1.	Bötzberg Railway (BöB)	Stein-Säckingen–Brugg AG	2 Aug. 1875	–	NOB and SCB (operated by the NOB)	47.970 km
1.	Bötzberg Railway (BöB)	Koblenz–Stein-Säckingen	1 Aug. 1892	–	NOB and SCB (operated by the NOB)	25.501 km
1.	Bötzberg Railway (BöB)	Total (190)		21.40 km (29%)	NOB and SCB (operated by the NOB)	73.471 km
2.	Aargau Southern Railway (ASB) Rupperswil–Hendschiken–Wohlen–Immensee and Brugg AG–Hendschiken		1874 bis 1882	–	NOB and SCB (operated by the SCB)	57.472 km
3.	Wohlen–Bremgarten Railway (WB)		1 Sept. 1876	–	NOB, SCB and Bremgarten municipality (operated by the SCB)	6.620 km

=== Assumed lines ===
Railway company	Section	Opening	Length	Remarks	Participation of NOB	Takeover date
Swiss Northern Railway (SNB)	Zürich–Baden railway	9 August 1847	22.53 km		–	1 July 1853
Zürich-Bodenseebahn (ZBB)	Zürich–Winterthur –Romanshorn	(18 May 1855)	82.54 km	Taken over before start of operation	–	1 July 1853
Rheinfall Railway	Winterthur–Schaffhausen	(16 April 1857)	30.38 km	Taken over before start of operation	–	4 November 1856
Bülach-Regensberg-Bahn (BR)	Oerlikon–Oberglatt–Bülach/Dielsdorf	1 May 1865	20.30 km	Operated by the NOB	CHF 0.6 m bonds (33%)	1 January 1877
Bischofszellerbahn (SG)	Sulgen–Gossau	1 February 1876	22.67 km	Operated by the NOB	CHF 03 m shares (19%)	1 August 1885
Effretikon-Wetzikon-Hinwil-Bahn (EH)	Effretikon–Hinwil	17 August 1876	22.67 km	Operated by the NOB, bankrupt in 1885	CHF 0.5 m shares (20%)	1 January 1886
Zürich–Zug–Lucerne Railway (ZZL)	Zürich Altstätten–Kollermühle–Zug/ –Untergrund (–Lucerne)	1 June 1864	62.55 km	Operated by the NOB	CHF 6 m shares (50%)	1 January 1892

== Rolling stock ==
In 1882, the company owned 142 locomotives, 488 passenger cars and 2400 freight cars.
