= Birmensdorf railway station =

Railway station in Switzerland

Birmensdorf
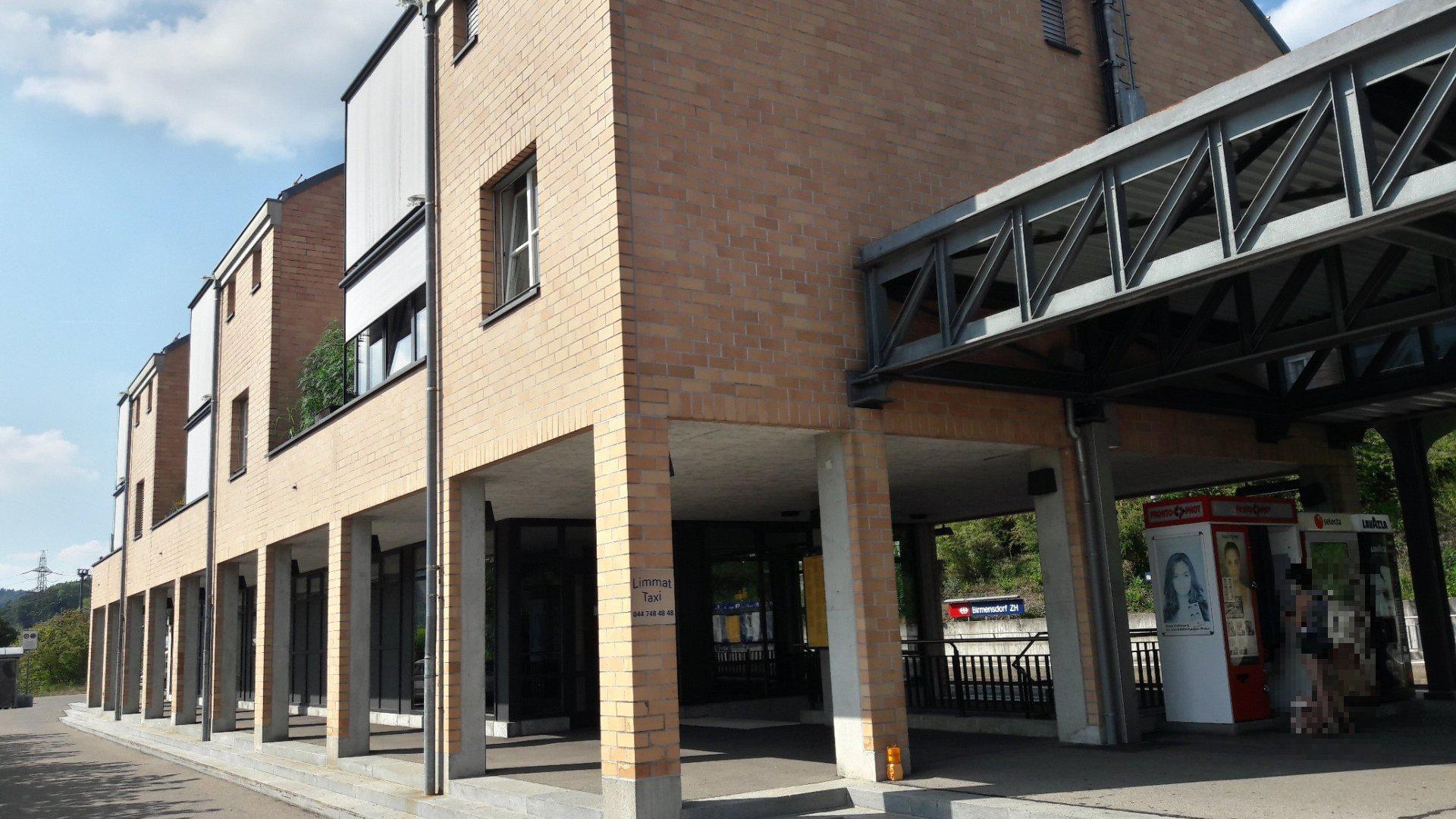
- Birmensdorf railway station

General information
- Location: Zürcherstrasse; Birmensdorf, Zurich; Switzerland
- Coordinates: 47.35761°N 8.437189°E
- Elevation: 488 m (1,601 ft)
- Owner: Swiss Federal Railways
- Operator: Swiss Federal Railways
- Line: Zurich–Affoltern am Albis–Zug
- Platforms: 2 side platforms
- Tracks: 2
- Connections: ZVV
- Bus: VBZ line 314; PostAuto lines 215 227 245 350

Other information
- Fare zone: 154 (ZVV)

History
- Opened: 1864

Services
Preceding station	Zurich S-Bahn	Following station
Bonstetten-Wettswil towards Zug	S5	Urdorf Weihermatt towards Pfäffikon SZ
Bonstetten-Wettswil towards Affoltern am Albis	S14	Urdorf Weihermatt towards Hinwil
Bonstetten-Wettswil towards Knonau	SN5 Limited service	Urdorf Weihermatt towards Pfäffikon SZ
Location
- Location within Switzerland Location within Canton of Zurich

Birmensdorf is a railway station in the municipality of Birmensdorf, in the Swiss canton of Zurich. The station is located on the Zurich to Zug via Affoltern am Albis railway line, within fare zone 154 of the Zürcher Verkehrsverbund (ZVV).

== Service ==
Birmensdorf station is served by Zurich S-Bahn lines S5 and S14. During weekends (Friday and Saturday nights), there is also a nighttime S-Bahn service (SN5) offered by ZVV. Summary of S-Bahn services:

- Zurich S-Bahn:
  - S5: half-hourly service between Zug and Pfäffikon SZ via Zürich HB.
  - S14: half-hourly service between Affoltern am Albis and Hinwil via Zürich HB.
  - Nighttime S-Bahn (only during weekends):
    - SN5: hourly service between Knonau and Pfäffikon SZ via Zürich HB and Uster.

== See also ==
- Rail transport in Switzerland
