= Zurich Altstetten railway station =

Railway station in the Altstetten quarter of the Swiss city of Zürich

Zürich Altstetten
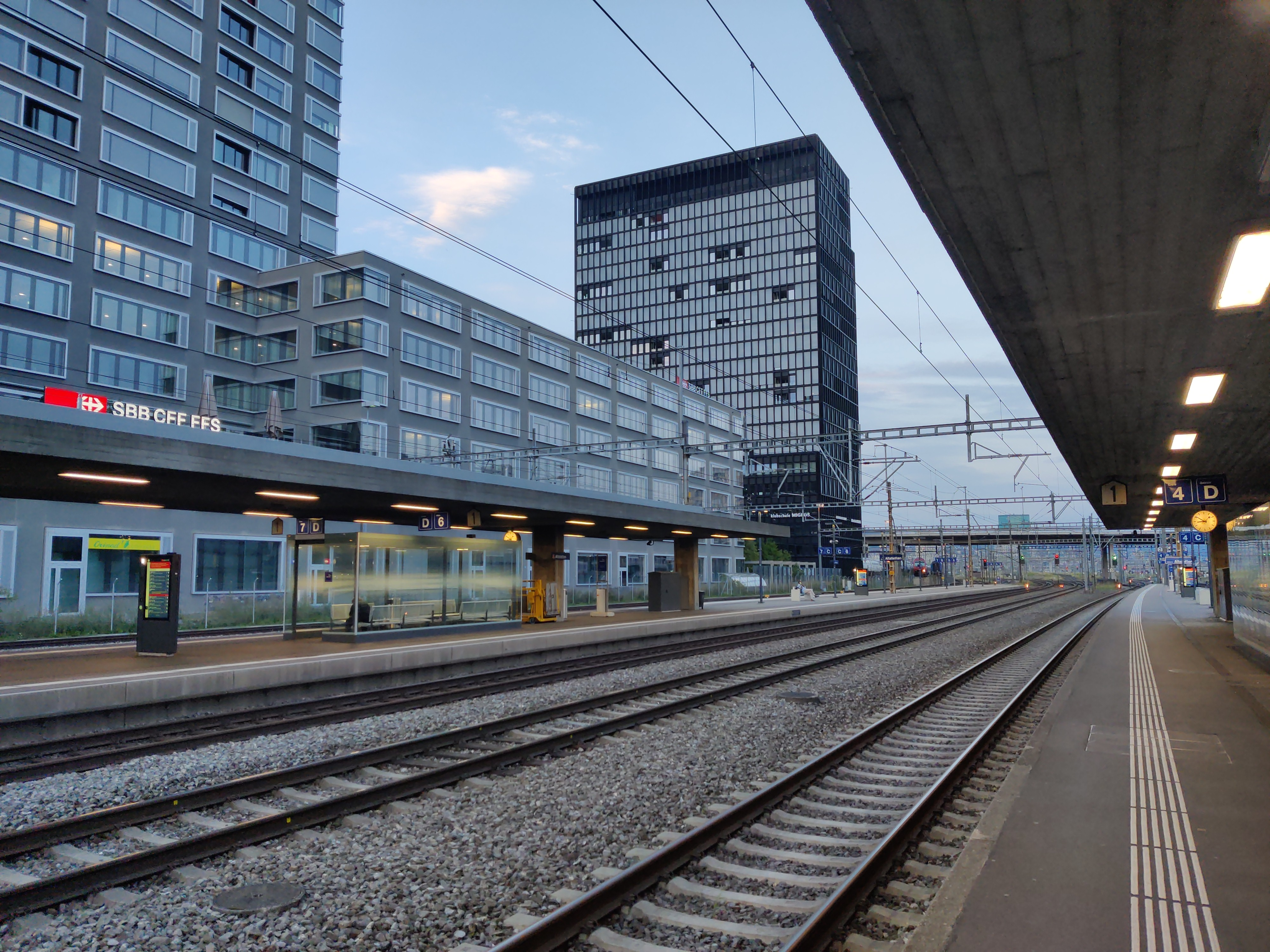
- The station's platforms in 2024

General information
- Location: Altstetten, Zürich; Switzerland
- Coordinates: 47°23′29″N 8°29′20″E
- Elevation: 399 m (1,309 ft)
- Owner: Swiss Federal Railways (since 1902); Schweizerische Nordostbahn (1853–1902); Schweizerische Nordbahn (1847–1853)
- Lines: Zürich–Baden railway line; Zürich–Affoltern am Albis–Zug railway line
- Platforms: 3
- Tracks: 5
- Train operators: Südostbahn; Swiss Federal Railways
- Connections: ZVV: Bhf. Altstetten
- Tram: AVA/VBZ trams 20 51
- Trolleybus: VBZ 31
- Bus: VBZ 45 78 80 83 89 307; Glattalbus bus line 485

Other information
- Fare zone: ZVV 110
- Website: Station map

History
- Opened: 1847

Passengers
- 2025: 40,500 per day (SBB, SOB)
- Rank: 17 out of 1,095
Services
Preceding station	Südostbahn	Following station
Olten towards Bern	IR 35 Aare Linth	Zürich HB towards Chur
Preceding station	SBB CFF FFS	Following station
Dietikon towards Basel SBB	IR 36	Zürich HB towards Zürich Airport
Preceding station	Zurich S-Bahn	Following station
Urdorf towards Zug	S5	Zürich Hardbrücke towards Pfäffikon SZ
Schlieren towards Aarau	S11	Zürich Hardbrücke towards Seuzach or Wila
Schlieren towards Brugg AG	S12	Zürich Hardbrücke towards Schaffhausen or Wil
Urdorf towards Affoltern am Albis	S14	Zürich HB towards Hinwil
Dietikon towards Koblenz	S19	Zürich HB towards Pfäffikon ZH
Dietikon towards Muri AG	S42	Zürich HB Terminus
Schlieren towards Aarau	SN1 Limited service	Zürich Hardbrücke towards Winterthur
Urdorf towards Knonau	SN5 Limited service	Zürich Hardbrücke towards Pfäffikon SZ
Schlieren towards Olten	SN11 Limited service	Zürich Hardbrücke towards Winterthur
Location

Zurich Altstetten railway station (German: Bahnhof Zürich Altstetten) is a railway station in the Altstetten quarter of the Swiss city of Zurich. The station is located on the Zürich to Olten main line and is the junction for the Zürich to Zug via Affoltern am Albis line.

The station is served by lines S5, S11, S12, S14, S19, and S42 of the Zürich S-Bahn. It is also a calling point for the hourly InterRegio services that link Basel to Zurich Airport via Zürich Hauptbahnhof, and Bern to Zürich via Olten.

The station is situated within fare zone 110 of the Zürcher Verkehrsverbund (ZVV) and well connected to the ZVV network, with bus and tram stops on both sides of the station. Since 2022 the station also serves as the eastern terminus of the Limmattal light rail line.

== History ==
The first station on the site was built by the Swiss Northern Railway in 1847, as part of their pioneering line from Zürich to Baden, and hence was one of the first railway stations in Switzerland. Over time, this line became today's Zürich to Olten main line and the principal rail route between Zürich and northern and western Switzerland. The Zürich to Zug via Affoltern am Albis line opened in 1864, making Altstetten into a junction station. In 1907, the Swiss Federal Railways, who had taken over both lines, opened a workshop near the station.

== Layout ==
The station has one side platform and two island platforms, served by five tracks, and has station buildings and entrances on both the north and south sides of the station. The platforms and entrances are connected by a pair of pedestrian subways. The tracks are numbered 2–4 and 6–7.

There are two stations with tram and bus services. Bhf. Altstetten Nord is located north to the railway station, while Bahnhof Altstetten is situated south of the station. Route 51 of the Zurich tram system serves the Bhf. Altstetten Nord station, whilst route 31 of the Zurich trolleybus system passes the south side of the station (Bahnhof Altstetten). Bus routes 45, 78, 80, 83 and 89 also serve the south side of the station, whilst routes 307 and 485 both terminate at Bhf. Altstetten Nord.

Since December 2022, the Limmattal light rail line (route 20) terminates at Bahnhof Altstetten station. The light rail line has its own platforms, across the station plaza from platform two of the S-Bahn services. This service, operated by AVA, runs through the Limmat Valley region and connects to the Zürich tram network at Farbhof, just to the west of Altstetten station.

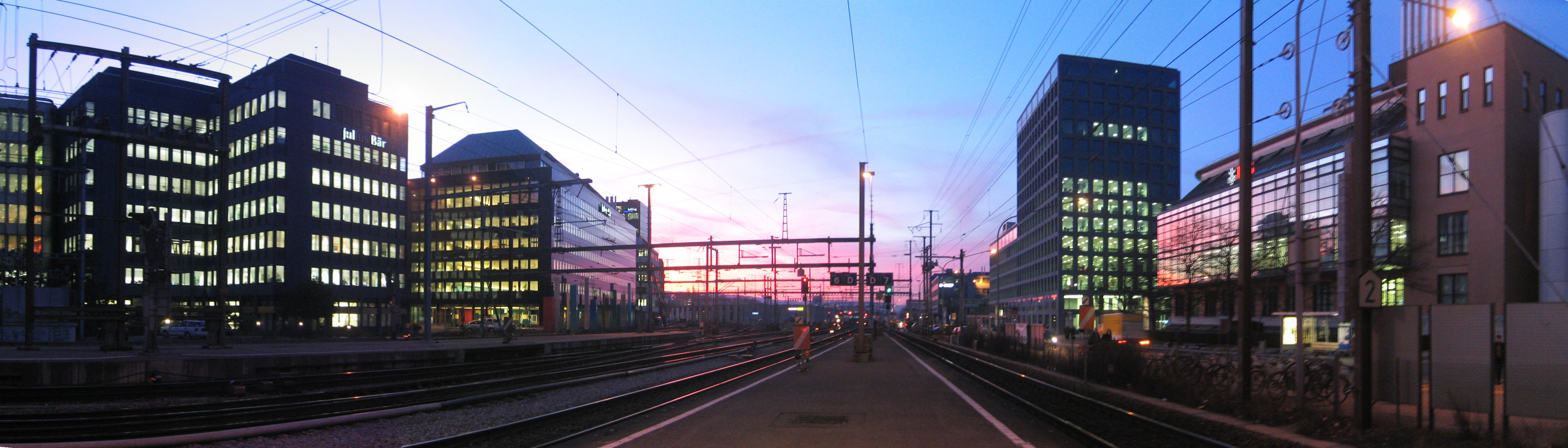
The station's platforms and tracks at sunset tracks surrounded by office buildings

== Services ==
=== Railway ===
As of the December 2023 timetable change, the following rail services stop at Zürich Altstetten:

- InterRegio:
  - : hourly service between Bern and Chur via Olten.
  - : hourly service between Basel SBB and Zurich Airport.
- Zürich S-Bahn:
  - S5 / S14: two trains per hour between Affoltern am Albis and Wetzikon and hourly service to Zug and Pfäffikon SZ.
  - S11: half-hourly service between Aarau and Winterthur; hourly service to Seuzach or Sennhof-Kyburg; rush-hour service to Wila.
  - S12: half-hourly service between Brugg AG and Winterthur; hourly service to Schaffhausen or Wil.
  - S19: hourly service to Koblenz via Baden (during peak hours), half-hourly to Effretikon (during peak hours to Pfäffikon ZH) via Zürich HB.
  - S42: peak-hour service between Muri AG and Zürich HB.
  - SN1: on Friday and Saturday night, hourly service between Aarau and Winterthur.
  - SN5: on Friday and Saturday night, hourly service between Knonau and Pfäffikon SZ.
  - SN11: on Friday and Saturday night, hourly service between Winterthur and Olten.

=== Local tram and bus services ===
Summary of tram and bus services:

- Bahnhof Altstetten to the south of the station, via both western and eastern underpass, AVA light rail line 20 , VBZ trolley bus line 31, and VBZ bus lines 45, 78, 80, 83, 89.
- Bhf. Altstetten Nord to the north, via the eastern underpass, VBZ tram line 51, VBZ bus line 307, and VBG line 485.

== See also ==
- List of railway stations in Zurich
- Public transport in Zurich
- Rail transport in Switzerland
