= Urdorf Weihermatt railway station =

Railway station in Switzerland

Urdorf Weihermatt
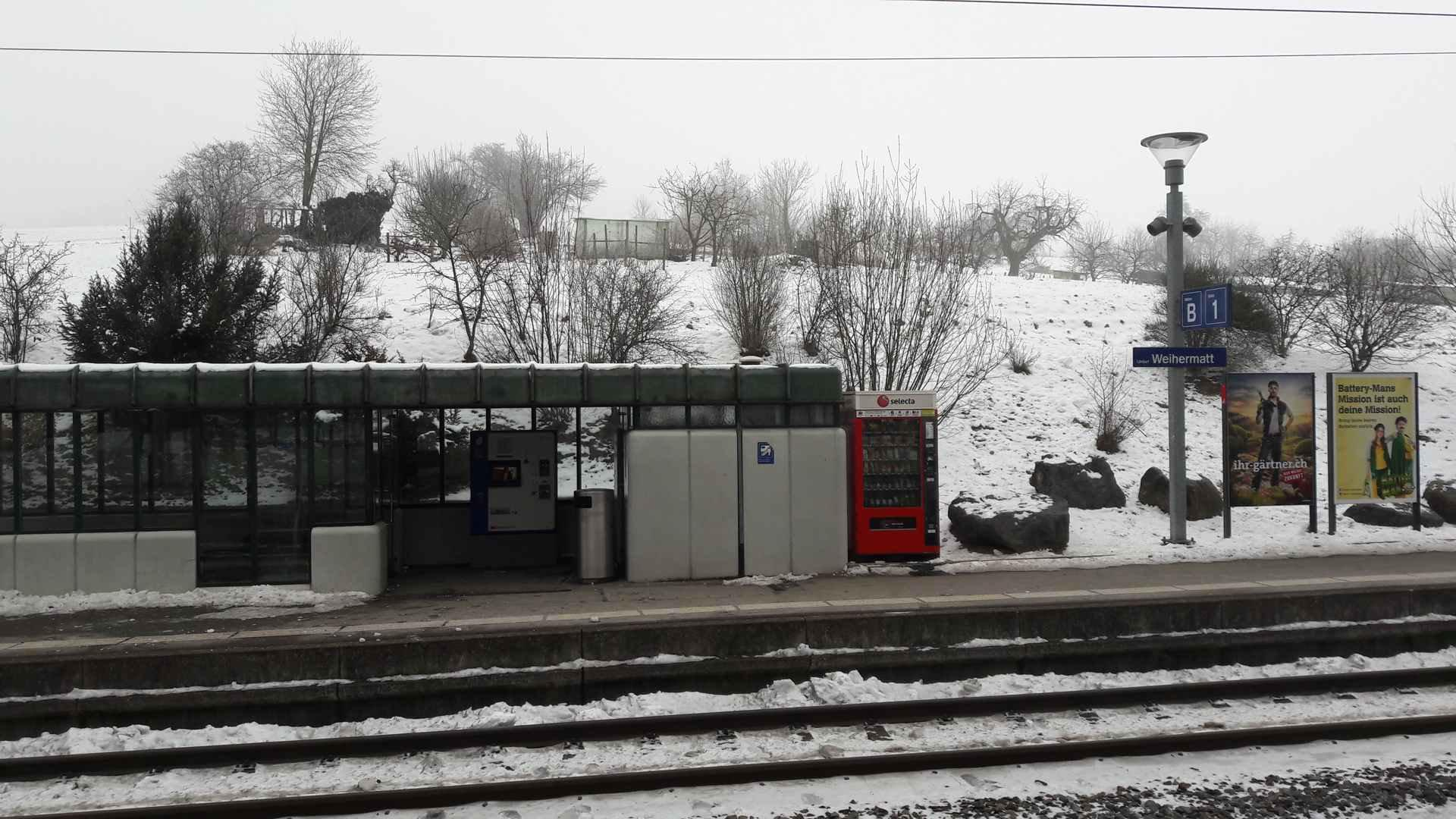
- Urdorf Weihermatt railway station

General information
- Location: Urdorf Weihermatt; Urdorf, Zurich; Switzerland
- Coordinates: 47.380958°N 8.430207°E
- Elevation: 456 m (1,496 ft)
- Owner: Swiss Federal Railways
- Operator: Swiss Federal Railways
- Line: Zürich–Affoltern am Albis–Zug
- Platforms: 2 side platforms
- Tracks: 2

Other information
- Fare zone: 154 (ZVV)

History
- Opened: 1990

Services
Preceding station	Zurich S-Bahn	Following station
Birmensdorf towards Zug	S5	Urdorf towards Pfäffikon SZ
Birmensdorf towards Affoltern am Albis	S14	Urdorf towards Hinwil
Birmensdorf towards Knonau	SN5 Limited service	Urdorf towards Pfäffikon SZ
Location
- Location within Switzerland Location within Canton of Zurich

Urdorf Weihermatt is a railway station in the municipality of Urdorf, in the Swiss canton of Zurich. The station is located on the Zurich to Zug via Affoltern am Albis railway line, within fare zone 154 of the Zürcher Verkehrsverbund (ZVV).

Urdorf Weihermatt railway station should not be confused with Urdorf railway station, situated some 1.25 kilometres (0.78 mi) away on the same line and served by the same trains.

== Service ==
The station is served by Zurich S-Bahn lines S5 and S14. During weekends (Friday and Saturday nights), there is also a nighttime S-Bahn service (SN5) offered by ZVV. Summary of S-Bahn services:

- Zurich S-Bahn:
  - S5: half-hourly service between Zug and Pfäffikon SZ via Zürich HB.
  - S14: half-hourly service between Affoltern am Albis and Hinwil via Zürich HB.
  - Nighttime S-Bahn (only during weekends):
    - SN5: hourly service between Knonau and Pfäffikon SZ via Zürich HB and Uster.

== See also ==
- Rail transport in Switzerland
