= Urdorf railway station =

Railway station in Switzerland

Urdorf
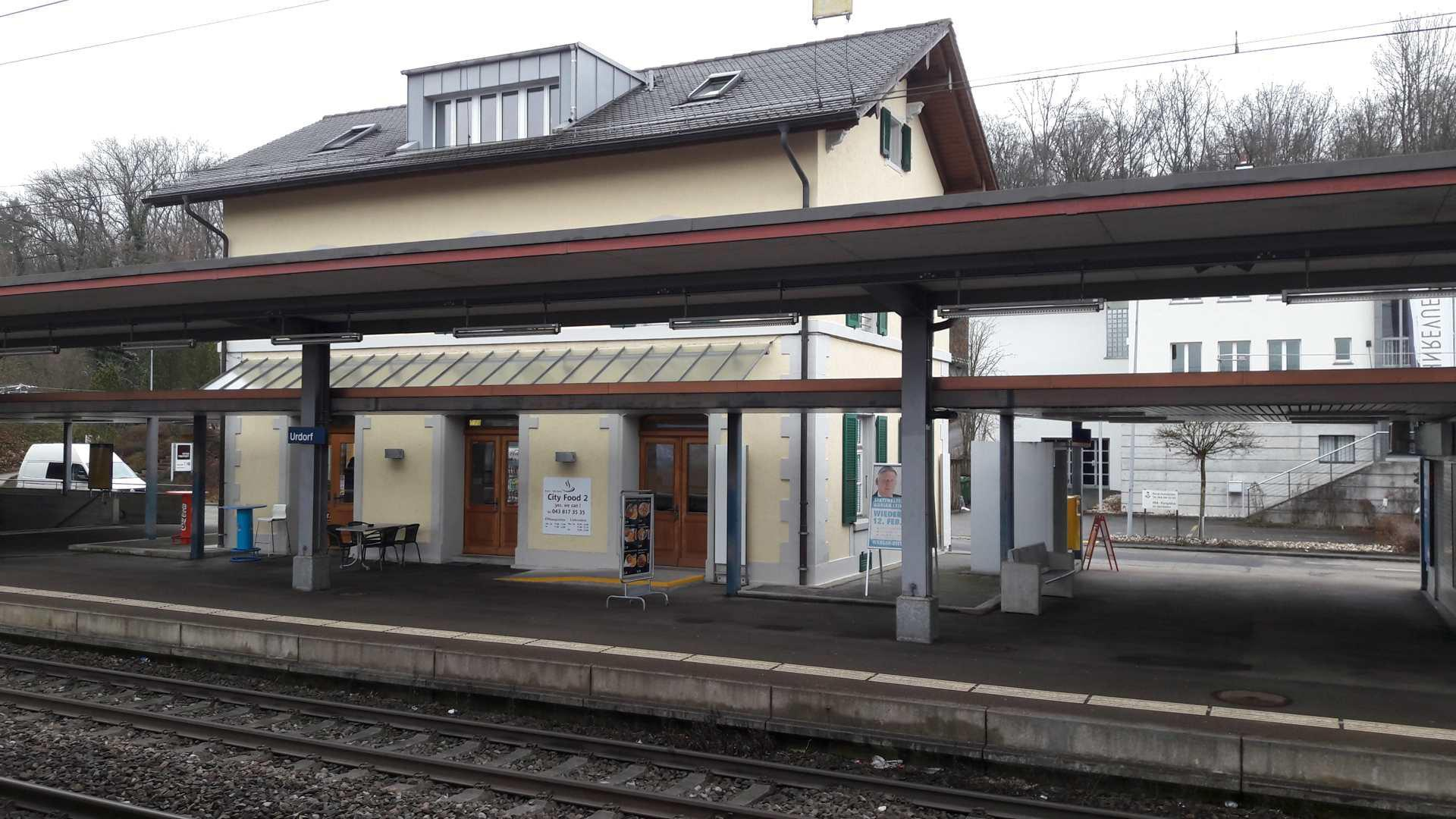
- Urdorf railway station

General information
- Location: Stationstrasse; Schlieren, Zurich; Switzerland
- Coordinates: 47.390789°N 8.434839°E
- Elevation: 442 m (1,450 ft)
- Owner: Swiss Federal Railways
- Operator: Swiss Federal Railways
- Line: Zurich–Affoltern am Albis–Zug
- Platforms: 2 side platforms
- Tracks: 2

Other information
- Fare zone: 154 (ZVV)

History
- Opened: 1864

Services
Preceding station	Zurich S-Bahn	Following station
Urdorf Weihermatt towards Zug	S5	Zürich Altstetten towards Pfäffikon SZ
Urdorf Weihermatt towards Affoltern am Albis	S14	Zürich Altstetten towards Hinwil
Urdorf Weihermatt towards Knonau	SN5 Limited service	Zürich Altstetten towards Pfäffikon SZ
Location
- Location within Switzerland Location within Canton of Zurich

Urdorf is a railway station in the Swiss canton of Zurich. The station is situated close to the boundary of the municipalities of Schlieren and Urdorf and, whilst it is actually in the former, it takes its name from the latter. The station is located on the Zurich to Zug via Affoltern am Albis railway line, within fare zone 154 of the Zürcher Verkehrsverbund (ZVV).

Urdorf railway station should not be confused with Urdorf Weihermatt railway station, situated some 1.25 kilometres (0.78 mi) away on the same line and served by the same trains.

== Service ==
Urdorf station is served by Zurich S-Bahn lines S5 and S14. During weekends (Friday and Saturday nights), there is also a nighttime S-Bahn service (SN5) offered by ZVV. Summary of S-Bahn services:

- Zurich S-Bahn:
  - S5: half-hourly service between Zug and Pfäffikon SZ via Zürich HB.
  - S14: half-hourly service between Affoltern am Albis and Hinwil via Zürich HB.
  - Nighttime S-Bahn (only during weekends):
    - SN5: hourly service between Knonau and Pfäffikon SZ via Zürich HB and Uster.

== See also ==
- Rail transport in Switzerland
