= Zurich–Affoltern am Albis–Zug railway =

Railway line in Switzerland

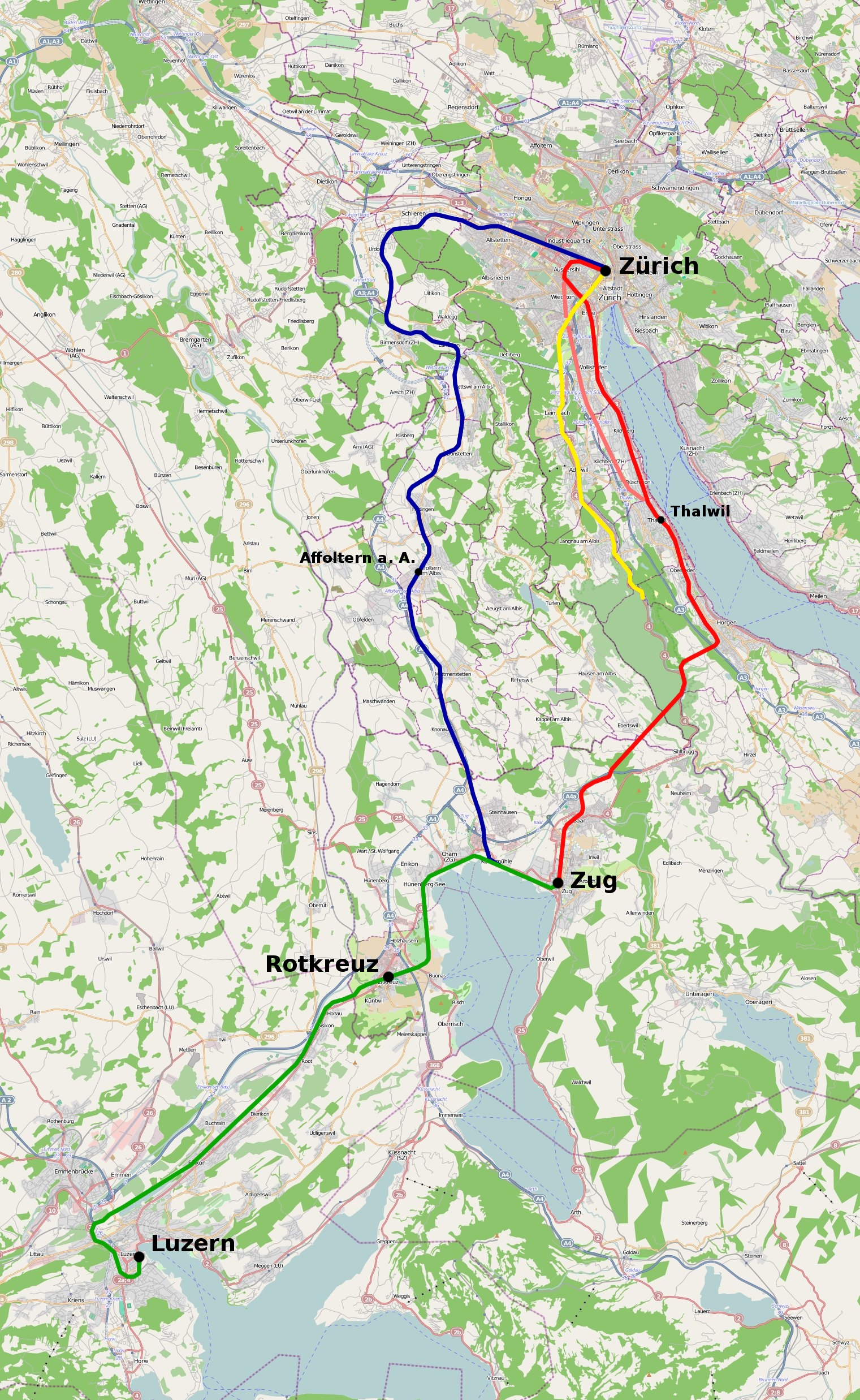
- Zurich–Affoltern–Zug railway is shown in blue

Overview
- Owner: Swiss Federal Railways
- Line number: 711
- Locale: Switzerland
- Termini: Zürich Altstetten; Zug

History
- Opened: 1 June 1864

Technical
- Number of tracks: 1–2
- Track gauge: 1,435 mm (4 ft 8 1/2 in) standard gauge
- Electrification: 15 kV 16.7 Hz AC overhead catenary
- Maximum incline: 1.9%

The Zurich–Affoltern am Albis–Zug railway is a railway connecting the Swiss cities of Zurich and Zug via Affoltern am Albis. It was opened by the Zurich–Zug–Lucerne Railway (German: Zürich-Zug-Luzern-Bahn) on 1 June 1864. The Zug–Lucerne line was opened by the same company on the same day. The line officially begins in Zürich Altstetten, which was still an independent municipality at that time. The line's only significant traffic consists of services on Zurich S-Bahn line S5. Long-distance trains between Zurich, Zug and Lucerne now run via the Zimmerberg Base Tunnel, the Thalwil–Arth-Goldau line and the Zug–Lucerne line.

== Route ==
The Zurich–Zug line connects to the line to Baden opened in 1847 at Zürich Altstetten, which had been rebuilt in preparation as a junction station. Rail services on the line use the line to/from Baden to connect with Zürich Hauptbahnhof. The Zurich–Zug–Lucerne Railway opened its line from Zürich Altstetten to Zug on 1 June 1864.

The line was connected at a triangular junction ("wye") at Kollermühle with the branch to Lucerne, so that until 1970 trains could run from Lucerne to Zurich without reversing. Zug station was a terminal station until the opening of the Thalwil–Arth-Goldau line. With the introduction of the new line, the station was rebuilt with a station building between the diverging lines. The Zug reversing loop, which made it possible to run from both directions into the station, was also built at that time.

The trains from Zurich always ran around the Zug loop until 5 May 1990, because points were only installed with the opening of double track between Zug and Cham through the Kollermühle operations yard. Although there had been two tracks between the Kollermülle yard and the branch to the Zug loop since the opening of the line, these had been operated as two parallel single tracks.

== History ==
The line runs through the historic Knonaueramt (now Affoltern District) and was therefore popularly known as the Knonauer-Strecke (Knonau line). It lost its importance as an approach to the Gotthard with the opening of the Thalwil–Arth-Goldau line in 1897. The direct Zurich–Luzern trains now used the route via Thalwil, so that this branch of the Zurich–Zug–Lucerne Railway was reduced to a secondary line without long-distance passenger services. Most freight trains from Zurich to Rotkreuz continued to run over the triangular junction.

The line from Altstetten to Zug was electrified at 15 kV 16.7 Hz AC on 15 October 1932.

When it was decided to transfer shunting from the former marshalling yard on the approach to Zürich Hauptbahnhof to Zurich Mülligen (only fast goods and postal traffic) and to Limmattal marshalling yard, it was clear that this traffic would be eliminated. For this reason, on 19 November 1970, the side of the rail triangle that connected Steinhausen with Cham was closed and dismantled. Freight trains now run via the Rupperswil–Immensee line to Rotkreuz.

The track from Urdorf to Mören was doubled on 23 October 1989. The Kollermühle–Zug section was doubled on 5 May 1990. The introduction of the Zurich S-Bahn in May 1990 made the railway more attractive again. As a result, there was a massive increase in passengers and services were added to the timetable. Various upgrades to the stations and the track were necessary for the introduction of services to Affoltern am Albis at quarter-hourly intervals in 2007.

== Railway stations ==
The intermediate stations at the opening were Urdorf, Birmensdorf, Bonstetten, Hedingen, Affoltern am Albis, Mettmenstetten and Knonau. They all had entrance buildings built to plans by Jakob Friedrich Wanner. These cubic stone buildings had a similar design and had window arranged in three or four bays.

Steinhausen station was built by the SBB after the nationalisation of the railway. Urdorf Weihermatt station was built for the opening of the S-Bahn. No trains that run via Affoltern am Albis stop at the new stations of the Zug Stadtbahn.

Station	Opening	Architect	Metres above sea level	Coordinates
Zürich Altstetten	1847 (reconstructed: 1966)	Max Vogt	399	47°23′29″N 8°29′20″E
Urdorf	1864	J. F. Wanner	442	47°23′27″N 8°26′05″E
Urdorf Weihermatt	1990		456	47°22′51″N 8°25′49″E
Birmensdorf	1864		488	47°21′27″N 8°26′15″E
Bonstetten-Wettswil	1864 (reconstructed: 2008)	Thomas Schinkhof	528	47°19′33″N 8°28′05″E
Hedingen	1864	J. F. Wanner	497	47°17′56″N 8°26′45″E
Affoltern am Albis	1864 (reconstructed: 2001)		494	47°16′34″N 8°26′48″E
Mettmenstetten	1864	J. F. Wanner	460	47°14′39″N 8°27′27″E
Knonau	1864	J. F. Wanner	436	47°13′13″N 8°28′00″E
Steinhausen	1904		424	47°11′40″N 8°28′42″E
Steinhausen Rigiblick	2012			47°11′17″N 8°28′47″E
Zug	1864 (reconstructed: 1897, 2004)	Klaus Hornberger	425	47°14′39″N 8°27′27″E

=== Fildern siding ===
During the construction of the Zurich West Bypass and the A4 motorway, a siding was temporarily set up at Fildern. The siding was equipped with a loading facility for receiving excavated material from the motorway tunnels at Aesch, Uetliberg and Islisberg in the area of the Zürich West junction. The siding was dismantled after the opening of the motorway.

== Operations ==
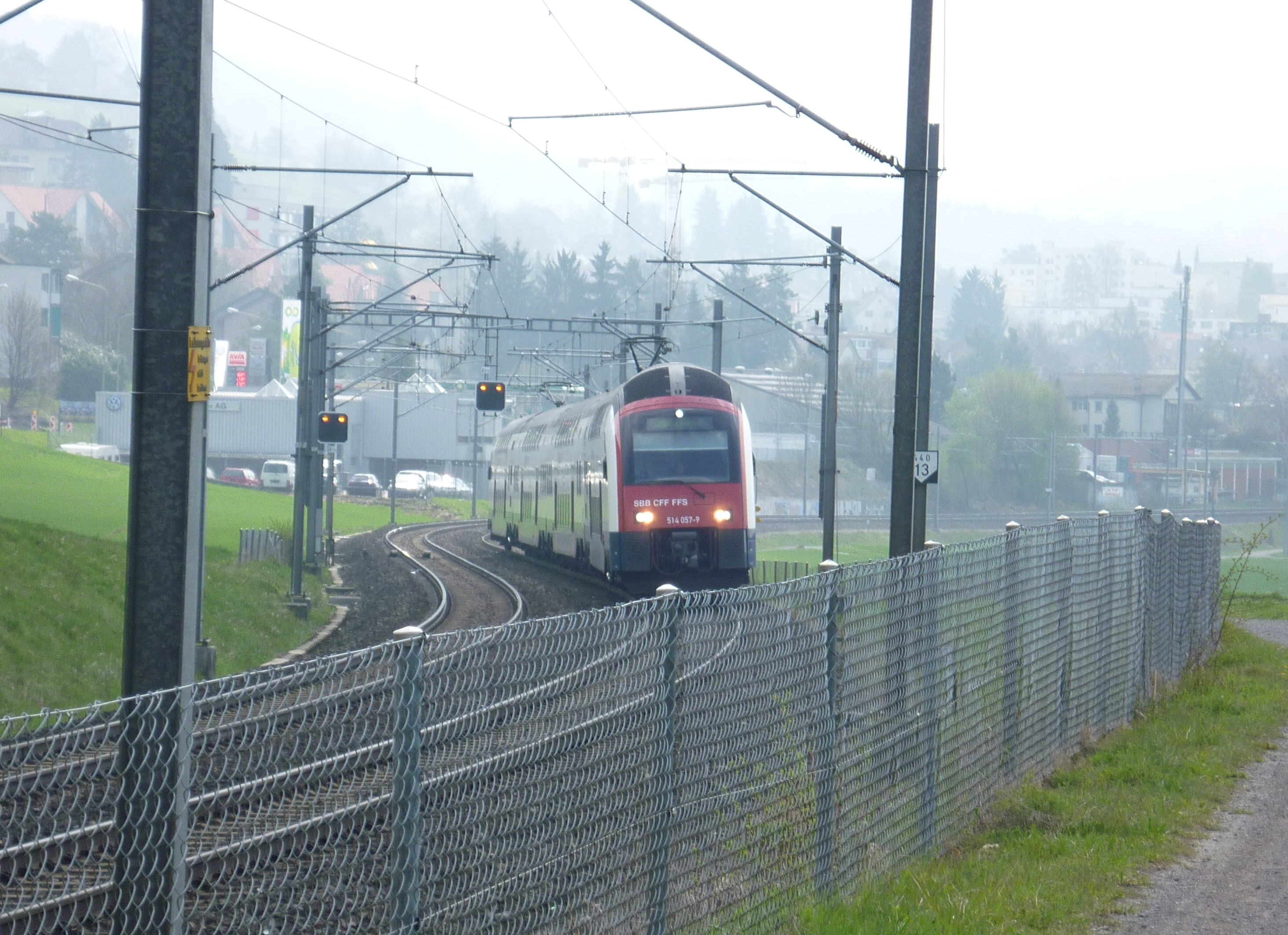
S15 service between Hedingen and Affoltern am Albis

.

Today, the S5 services of the S-Bahn Zurich operate half-hourly on the whole route. In addition, S14 services run between Zurich Altstetten and Affoltern during the day.

Table with travel time from Zurich and possible public transport connections.

Travel time in min	Station	Connections
00	Zürich Hauptbahnhof
02	Zürich Hardbrücke	S3S5S6S7S12S16
06	Zürich Altstetten	S3S12
10	Urdorf
12	Urdorf Weihermatt	buses
16	Birmensdorf ZH	buses
20	Bonstetten - Wettswil	buses
24	Hedingen
29	Affoltern am Albis	buses (terminus of S14 from Zurich)
32	Mettmenstetten	buses
36	Knonau
39	Steinhausen	buses
45	Zug	S21 Zug Stadtbahn: S 1 S 2, buses
