= List of reserves for waterbirds and migratory birds in Switzerland =

This is a list of reserves for waterbirds and migratory birds in Switzerland. The nature reserves on this inventory are protected by Swiss federal legislation (Federal Inventory of Water and Migratory Birds Reserves of National and International Importance).

== Reserves of international importance ==
| Number | Reserve | Canton | Since | Revised |
|---|---|---|---|---|
| 1 | Ermatingerbecken of Lake Constance | Thurgau | 1991 | |
| 2 | Stein am Rhein | Schaffhausen, Thurgau | 1991 | 2001 |
| 3 | Klingnauerstausee | Aargau | 1991 | |
| 4 | Fanel - Chablais de Cudrefin, Pointe de Marin | Bern, Fribourg, Vaud, Neuchâtel | 1991 | 2001 |
| 5 | Chevroux up to Portalban | Fribourg, Vaud | 1991 | 2001 |
| 6 | Yvonand up to Cheyres | Fribourg, Vaud | 1991 | 2001 |
| 7 | Grandson up to Champ-Pittet | Vaud | 1991 | 2001 |
| 8 | Les Grangettes | Vaud, Valais | 1991 | 2001 |
| 9 | Rhône up to Verbois | Geneva | 1991 | 2001 |
| 11 | Versoix up to Geneva | Geneva | 2001 | |

== Reserves of national importance ==
| Number | Reserve | Canton | Since | Revised |
|---|---|---|---|---|
| 101 | Col de Bretolet | Valais | 1991 | 2001 |
| 102 | Witi | Bern, Solothurn | 1992 | 2001 |
| 103 | Alter Rhein: Rheineck | St. Gallen | 2001 | |
| 104 | Rorschacher Bucht / Arbon | St. Gallen | 2001 | |
| 105 | Zürich-Obersee: Guntliweid up to Bätzimatt at the Buechberg hill | Schwyz | 2001 | |
| 106 | Reuss: Bremgarten -Zufikon up to Rottenschwil | Aargau | 2001 | |
| 108 | Kanderdelta up to Hilterfingen | Bern | 2001 | |
| 109 | Wohlensee (Halenbrücke up to Wohleibrücke) | Bern | 2001 | |
| 110 | Stausee Niederried | Bern | 2001 | |
| 111 | Hagneckdelta and Ile St-Pierre | Bern | 2001 | |
| 112 | Häftli near Büren | Bern | 2001 | |
| 113 | Aare near Solothurn and the Aar Flumenthal nature preserve | Solothurn | 2001 | |
| 114 | Plaine de l'Orbe: Chavornay up to Bochuz | Vaud | 2001 | |
| 115 | Salavaux | Vaud | 2001 | |
| 116 | Mies / Versoix | Vaud, Geneva | 2001 | |
| 117 | Pointe de Promenthoux | Vaud | 2001 | |
| 118 | Port Noir up to Hermance | Geneva | 2001 | |
| 119 | Bolle di Magadino | Ticino | 2001 | |

== See also ==
- Nature parks in Switzerland
