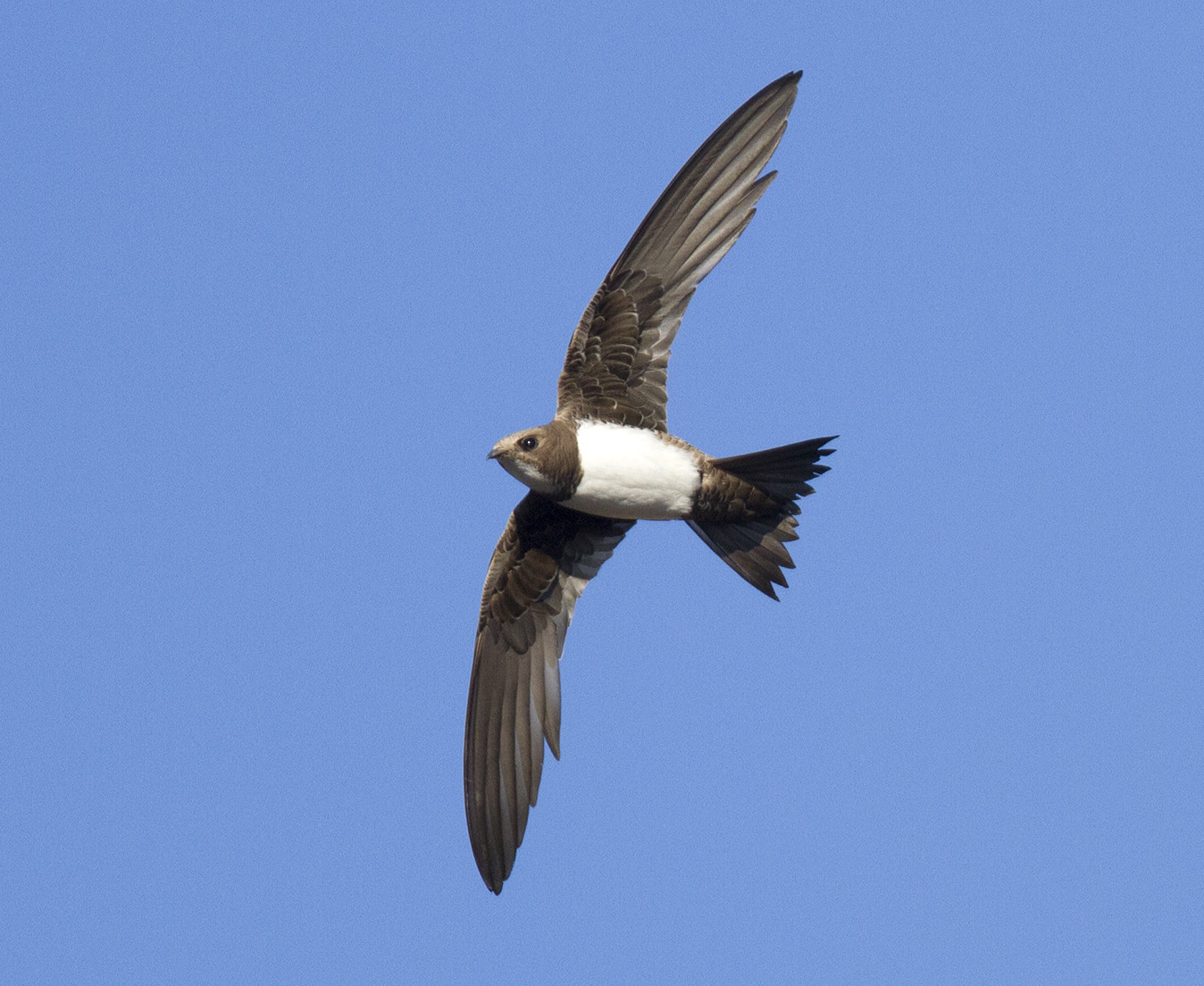
- Flying in Attica

Conservation status
- Least Concern (IUCN 3.1)

Scientific classification
- Kingdom: Animalia
- Phylum: Chordata
- Class: Aves
- Order: Apodiformes
- Family: Apodidae
- Genus: Tachymarptis
- Species: T. melba

Binomial name
- Tachymarptis melba (Linnaeus, 1758)
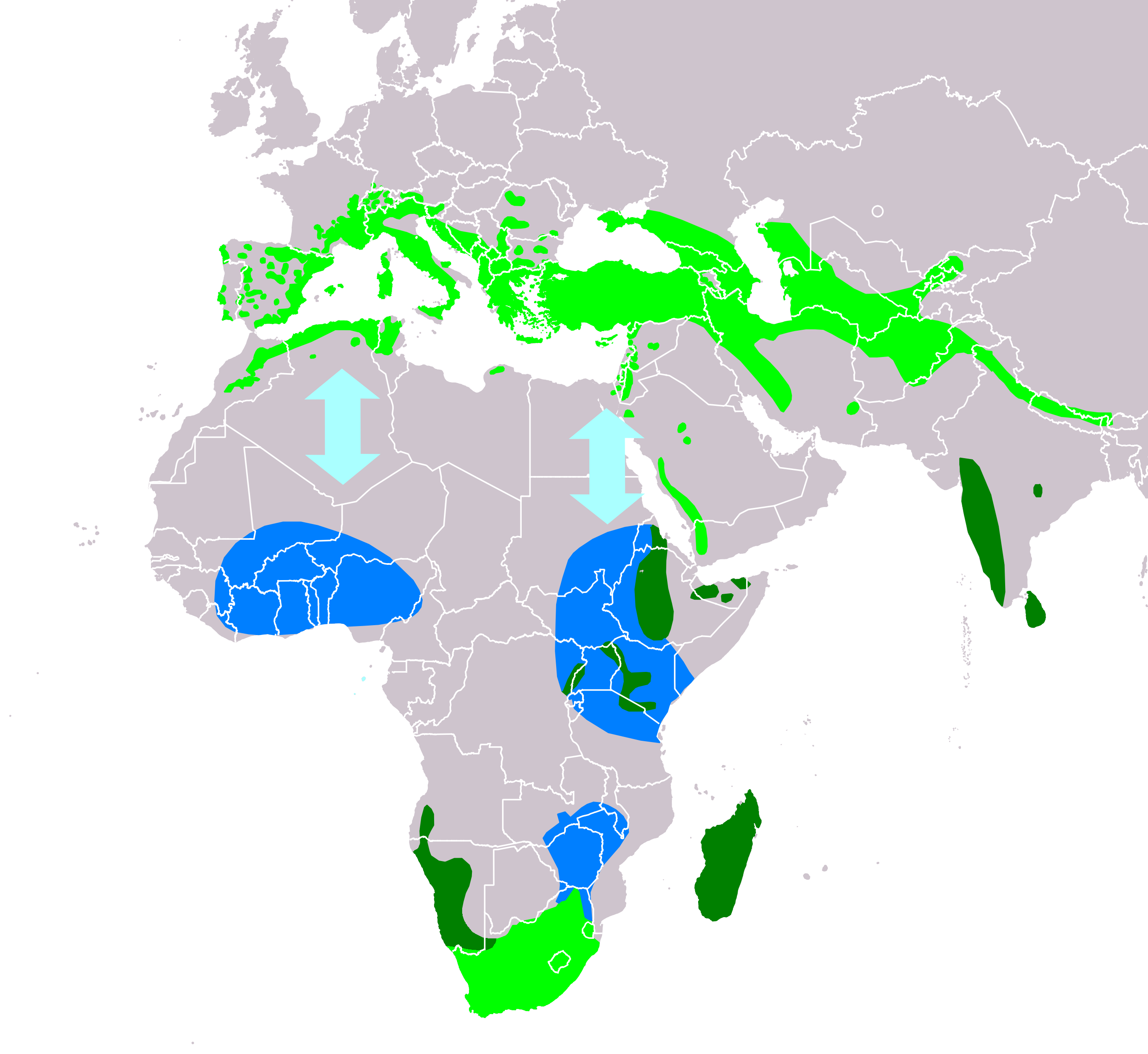
- Range of T. melba Breeding Resident Non-breeding Vagrant (seasonality uncertain) Possibly Extant (passage)

Synonyms
- Hirundo melba Linnaeus, 1758; Apus melba (Linnaeus, 1758)

= Alpine swift =

Species of bird

The alpine swift (Tachymarptis melba) is a species of swift found in Africa, southern Europe, and Asia. They breed in mountains from southern Europe to the Himalayas. Like common swifts, they are migratory; the southern European population winters further south in southern Africa. They have very short legs which are used for clinging to vertical surfaces. Like most swifts, they never settle voluntarily on the ground, spending most of their lives in the air living on the insects they catch in their beaks.

== Taxonomy ==
The alpine swift was formally described in 1758 by the Swedish naturalist Carl Linnaeus in the tenth edition of his Systema Naturae. He placed it with the swifts in the genus Hirundo and coined the binomial name Hirundo melba. Linnaeus specified the type locality as Gibraltar. Linnaeus based his account on "The greatest martin or swift" that had been described and illustrated in 1743 by the English naturalist George Edwards in his book A Natural History of Uncommon Birds. Edwards's specimen had been shot on the rock of Gibraltar. The alpine swift is now placed together with the mottled swift in the genus Tachymarptis that was introduced in 1922 by the South African zoologist Austin Roberts. The genus name is from the Ancient Greek ταχυς/takhus meaning "fast", and μαρπτις/marptis meaning "seizer". The etymology of the specific epithet melba is uncertain, but it may be a short form for melanoalba or melalba, from Ancient Greek μελας/melas, μελανος/melanos meaning "black" and Latin albus meaning "white".

Ten subspecies are recognised:

- T. m. melba (Linnaeus, 1758) – south Europe through Turkey to northwest Iran
- T. m. tuneti (Tschusi, 1904) – Morocco through the Middle East and east to west Pakistan
- T. m. archeri (Hartert, EJO, 1928) – north Somalia, southwest Arabia to Jordan and Israel
- T. m. maximus (Ogilvie-Grant, 1907) – Rwenzori Mountains (northeast DR Congo and Uganda)
- T. m. africanus (Temminck, 1815) – Ethiopia to South Africa and southwest Angola
- T. m. marjoriae (Bradfield, 1935) – central north Namibia and northwest South Africa
- T. m. willsi (Hartert, EJO, 1896) – Madagascar
- T. m. nubifugus (Koelz, 1954) – Himalayas
- T. m. dorabtatai (Abdulali, 1965) – west India
- T. m. bakeri (Hartert, EJO, 1928) – Sri Lanka

== Description and biology ==
This is a large swift measuring 20–22 cm in length with a wingspan of 54–60 cm with broad wings and tail with a shallow fork, superficially similar to a large barn swallow or house martin although unrelated to these two species, since swifts are in the order Apodiformes. The resemblance could be due to convergent evolution, reflecting similar lifestyles. Upper parts are olive-brown with sharp and long wings with wing-tips appearing blacker; underparts with white throat (often not easily visible) and highly visible and distinctive oval white belly patch encircled by olive-brown breastband, flanks and undertail-coverts. Races tuneti and marjoriae paler, with grey-brown plumage; archeri averages paler than tuneti, with shorter wings; maximus is the largest race, with very dark, blackish plumage; africanus and nubifugus smaller than nominate, with blacker plumage, smaller throat patch and blacker shaft-streaks on white areas; willsi and bakeri both smaller, with darker plumage and broader and narrower breast bands, respectively; dorabtatai has broader breast band and shorter wings than nubifugus and is separated from bakeri by its paler plumage and broader breast band.

Alpine swifts breed in mountains from southern Europe to the Himalaya. Like common swifts, they are strongly migratory, and winter much further south in southern Africa. They wander widely on migration, and are regularly seen in much of southern Europe, the Middle East, and Asia. The species seems to have been much more widespread during the last ice age, with a large colony breeding, for example in the Late Pleistocene Cave No 16, Bulgaria, around 18,000–40,000 years ago. The same situation has been found for Komarowa Cave near Częstochowa, Poland during a period about 20,000–40,000 years ago.

These apodiformes build their nests in colonies in a suitable cliff hole or cave, laying two or three eggs. Swifts will return to the same sites year after year, rebuilding their nests when necessary, and pairing for life. Young swifts in the nest can drop their body temperature and become torpid if bad weather prevents their parents from catching insects nearby. They have adapted well to urban conditions, frequently nesting in old buildings in towns around the Mediterranean, where large, low-flying flocks are a familiar feature there in summer. Alpine swifts have a short forked tail and very long swept-back wings that resemble a crescent or a boomerang but may (as in the image) be held stretched straight out. Their flight is slower and more powerful than that of their smaller relatives, with a call that is a drawn-out twittering (listen at right).

Alpine swifts are readily distinguished from the common swifts by their larger size and their white belly and throat. They are around twice as big as most other swifts in their range, about 20 to 23 cm (7.9 to 9.1 in) in length, with a wingspan of 57 cm (22 in) and a weight of around 100 g (3.5 oz). By comparison, the common swift has a wingspan of around 42 cm (17 in). They're largely dark brown in colour with a dark neck band that separates the white throat from the white belly. Juveniles are similar to adults, but their feathers are pale edged.

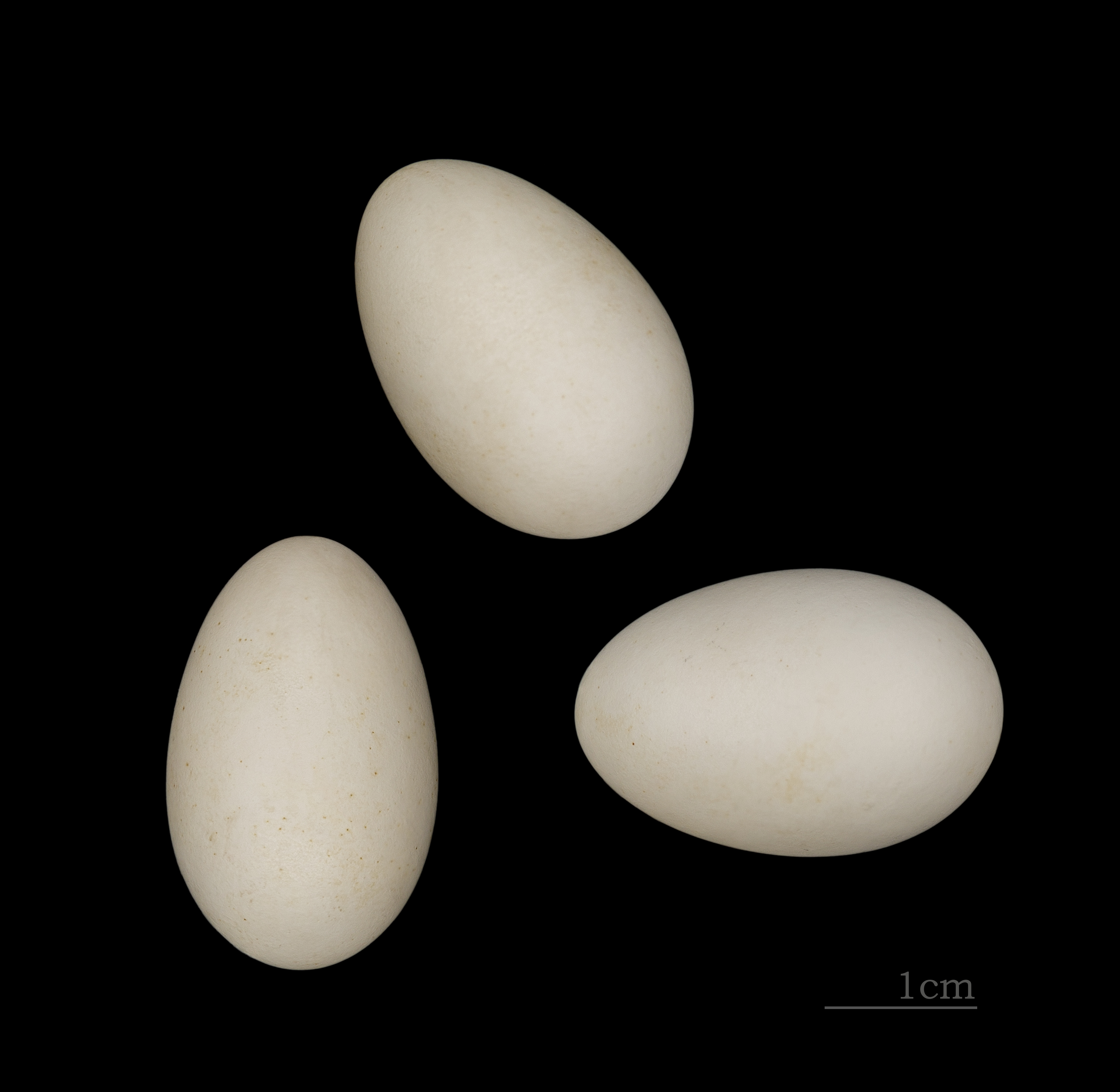
Eggs of Tachymarptis melba

Alpine swift call
The call is a drawn-out twittering.

== Distribution and habitat ==
It is a polytypic species found all year-round in eastern and southern Africa, Madagascar, western peninsular India and Sri Lanka, with larger non-breeding distributions in western, eastern and southern Africa, parts of the western edge of the Arabian peninsula, and breeding across southern Europe in the west across Turkey, northwards through the Caucasus and along the east coast of the Black Sea to the Crimean peninsula and Central Asia up to Turkestan and to the south along Iran and Afghanistan up to Balochistan in Western Pakistan and further east along the Himalayas. There are also scattered populations in northwestern Africa with an isolated population in Northern Libya. The distribution of the 10 sub-species are: (1) A. m. melba (76–120g) described originally by Linnaeus (1758) with type-locality Gibraltar distributed across southern Europe (east from Iberian Peninsula) and northern Morocco and east through Asia Minor to northwest Iran and wintering in west, central and east Africa, (2) A. m. tuneti (95–110g) described by von Tschusi in 1904 with type-locality in Tunisia and distributed across central and eastern Morocco eastwards to Libya and through Middle East and Iran (except northwest where A. m. melba) to southeast Kazakhstan and up to western Pakistan, and wintering in west and east Africa, (3) A. m. archeri described by Hartert (1928) with type-locality Hargeisa, in Somaliland distributed from the Dead Sea depression at the borders of Israel and Jordan, south to southwest Arabia and Somalia, (4) A. m. africanus (67–87g) described by Temminck (1815) with type-locality in South Africa distributed across east and southern Africa and southwest Angola with some populations of this sub-species wintering in east Africa, (5) A. m. maximus (128g) described by Ogilvie-Grant (1907) with type-locality in the eastern slopes of the Rwenzori mountains at 3,000–3,700 m (10,000–12,000 ft) distributed across Uganda and DR Congo, (6) A. m. marjoriae described by R D Bradfield (1935) from Quickborn, Damaraland distributed in Namibia and adjacent western South Africa in the northwestern parts of Northern Cape, (7) A. m. willsi described by Ernst Hartnert (1896) from Madagascar and endemic to the island, (8) A. m. nubifugus described by Koelz (1854) distributed across the Himalayas and wintering in central India, (9) A. m. dorabtatai described by Abdulali (1965) distributed in western peninsular India, (10) A. m. bakeri described by Hartert (1928) from Sri Lanka distributed only on that island-nation. In the western palearctic, temperate and mediterranean zones, it is typically in the mountains but occasionally in lowlands, while in remainder of sub-Saharan Africa and south Asia, it occurs in a larger variety of habitats ranging from sub-desert steppe to mountains. It typically breeds below 1,500 m (4,900 ft) but may sometimes go up to 2,300 m (7,500 ft). In the tropical parts of it range in Kenya, it has been recorded breeding above 4000 m and in the Himalayas, it has been observed foraging at 3,700 m (12,100 ft). Seen entering probable nesting sites at 2,100 m (6,900 ft) on Madagascar.

Alpine swifts have been recorded in some places in the Americas, including in Bermuda, Brazil, Barbados, Puerto Rico, French Guiana, Saint Lucia, and Guadeloupe.

== Behaviour and ecology ==
It has a powerful and rapid flight with deep slow wing beats. They are known to engage in twilight ascent, which is characterised by increased flight activity and gaining altitude and longer-distance horizontal flights at dawn and dusk, possibly part of social interactions between individuals. Alpine swifts spend most of their lives in the air, living on the insects they catch in their beaks. They drink on the wing, but roost on vertical cliffs or walls. A study published in 2013 showed Alpine swifts can spend over six months flying without having to land. All vital physiological processes, including sleep, can be performed while in air. In 2011, Felix Liechti and his colleagues at the Swiss Ornithological Institute attached electronic tags that log movement to six alpine swifts and it was discovered that the birds could stay aloft in the air for more than 200 days straight.

=== Breeding ===
Alpine swifts breed in colonies of up to hundreds of pairs on cliffsides or buildings. They habitually return to the same colonies year after year, and are considered monogamous, featuring a relatively low rate of extra-pair paternity among females. They breed once a year, each clutch having 1-4 eggs. The brood is incubated and fed by both parents.

Nestling development is strongly influenced by weather because the adults depend on airborne arthropods, which become less available during cold or rainy conditions. A long-term study of colonies in Switzerland found that nestlings generally fledged between 50 and 70 days after hatching, and that adverse weather reduced their survival and growth. Wing growth was particularly responsive to weather experienced throughout development, while body mass and sternum growth were more strongly associated with conditions during shorter developmental periods.

Sexual dimorphism is cryptic, with males having a slightly longer tail fork– about 7% longer on average.

=== Food and feeding ===
The alpine swift's diet consists mainly of arthropods, principally insects but also spiders. Insects across 10 orders and 79 families were documented in the diets of individuals from Africa and Europe, with the homoptera, diptera and hymenoptera being the most often consumed.
