= Wüeribach =

Tributary of the Reppisch

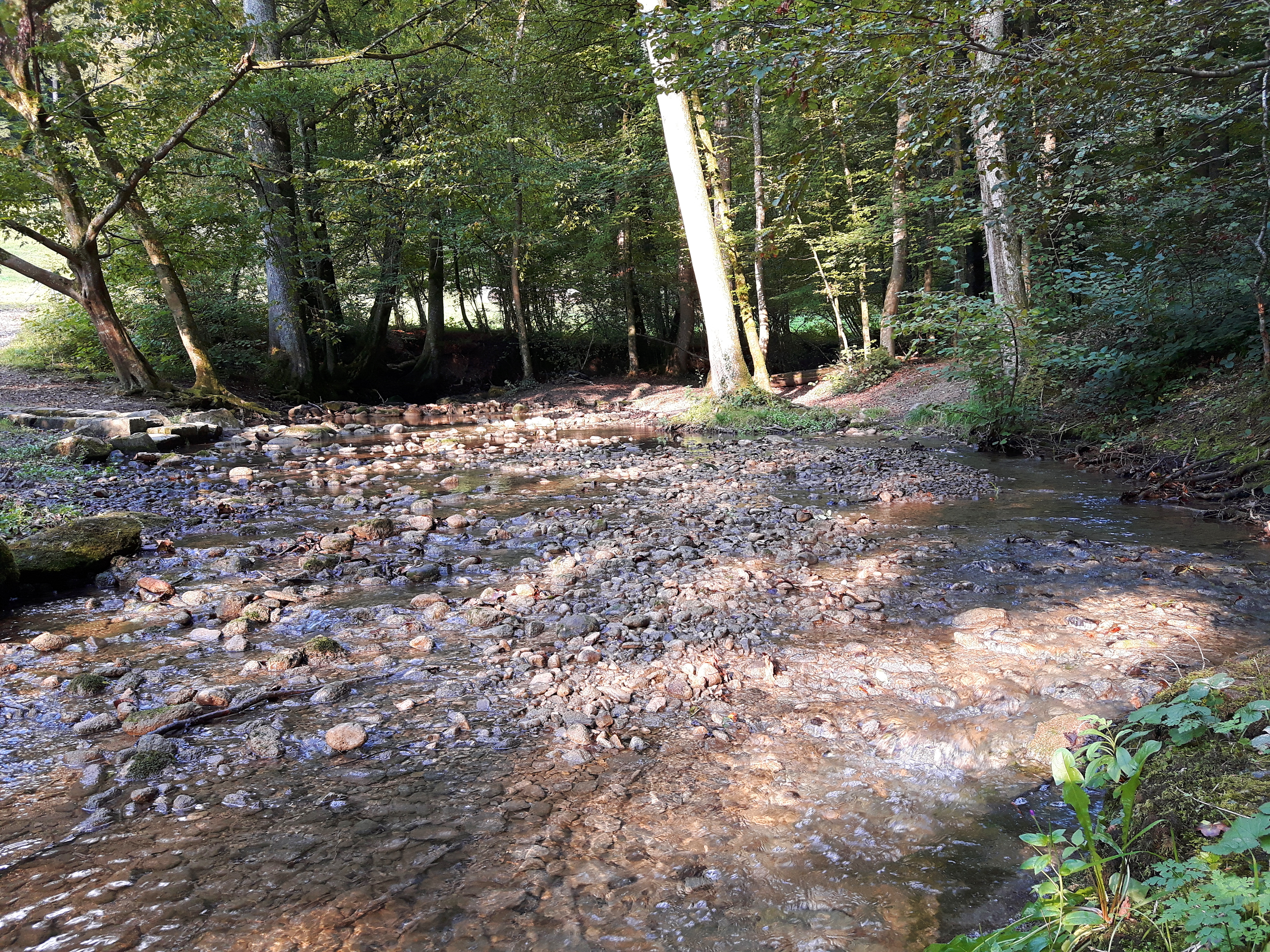
- The Wüeribach in the Wüerital valley near Birmensdorf

Location
- Location: Canton of Zürich
- Reference no.: CH: 692

Physical characteristics
- Source
  - location: Above Bonstetten
  - coordinates: 47°18′20″N 8°28′15″E
  - elevation: 643 m above the sea
- Mouth
  - location: In Birmensdorf into the Reppisch
  - coordinates: 47°21′20″N 8°25′55″E
  - elevation: 461 m above the sea
- Length: 7.8 km
- Basin size: 14.6 km^{2}
- Discharge
  - location: at mouth gauge
  - average: 310 L/s

Basin features
- Progression: Reppisch→ Limmat→ Aare→ Rhine→ North Sea
- River system: Rhine
- Landmarks: Villages: Bonstetten, Wettswil am Albis, Birmensdorf
- Tributaries
  - left: Fluechbach, Filderenbach, Aescherbach
  - right: Fridgraben

The Wüeribach (also called the Dorfbach and Fischbach in its upper reaches) is a tributary of the Reppisch, around 8 kilometres long, in the Canton of Zürich in Switzerland. It rises in the municipality of Bonstetten, flows through the narrow Wüerital valley and reaches the Reppisch valley near Birmensdorf, wo it empties, parallel to the rather smaller Lunnerenbach, into the lower Reppisch. The Wüeribach is the longest and biggest tributary of the Reppisch and has an average flow rate of 310 L/s.

== Geography ==
=== Course ===
The Wüeribach rises as the Dorfbach at 643 m above the sea in the forest area of Birch above Bonstetten. From here it flows initially mainly in a northwestern direction through the village of Bonstetten, much of it being canalized as it passes through. It leaves the village and runs, having been straightened out, through fields across a wide plain in a northern direction. Shortly afterwards the stream reaches the municipal boundary with Wettswil am Albis, where it is called the Fischbach. It passes to the west of the village and collects the waters of the roughly four-kilometre-long Fridgraben. It reaches the northern municipal boundary with Birmensdorf, where the stream snakes through the narrow Wüerital into the Reppisch valley. This valley was formed in the last ice age as a meltwater gully of the Wettswiler and the Aescher Zunge of the Reuss Glacier. The Wüeribach now reaches Birmensdorf, collects the Aescherbach from the left and finally discharges into the Reppisch at an elevation of 461 m above the sea.

=== Catchment ===
The catchment area is 14.6 km^{2} and extends over the districts of Affoltern and Dietikon. 51.6% of the catchment area is used for agriculture, 24.6% is built up and 23.9% is near-natural vegetation and forest. The highest point of the catchment area is 680 m above the sea in Islisberg, its average elevation is 572 m above the sea

In the south is the catchment of the Hofibach, which drains into the Jonen; in the west is the catchment of the Aescherbach and to the east and north lies the valley of the Reppisch.

=== Tributaries ===
First- and higher-order tributaries of the Wüeribach with their length:

Wüeribach source (643 m above the sea)

- Strassacherbach (left), 1.1 km
  - Bodenfeldbach (left), 0.8 km
- Fluechbach (left), 2 km
  - Dornmattbach (right), 0.5 km
  - right-hand side arm (right), 0.1 km
  - Hirschenbach (left), 0.9 km
    - Chäserenbach (right), 0.2 km
  - Lüttenbergbach (left), 0.5 km
  - Schrannenbach/Schrannenbächli (left), 0.3 km
- Fridgraben (right), 4,2 km
  - Isenbach (left), 0.4 km
    - Schladmatterbach (left), 0.3 km
  - Schachenbach (right), 1.1 km
  - Hofächerbach (right), 0.4 km
- Wettswiler West Channel (left), 0.7 km
- Filderenbach (left), 1.3 km
- Täntenbach (left), 1.1 km
- Cholholzbächli (left), 0.1 km
- Gättikerbächli (left), 0.2 km
- Aescherbach (left), 3.2 km
  - Sunnebrunne (left), 0.1 km
  - Moosbächli (right), 0.2 km
  - Uelisweidbächli (right), 1 km
  - Stierenwaldbach (left), 0.8 km
    - Eichholzbach (right), 0.5 km
  - Chürzibach (right), 1.5 km
  - Mättlibach (left), 0.2 km
  - Rebacherbach (right), 0.2 km
  - Sägissenbach (left), 0.2 km
  - Chilstigbächli (left), 0.2 km

Wüeribach mouth (461 m above the sea)

== See also ==
- List of rivers of Switzerland
