= Reppisch =

River in Switzerland

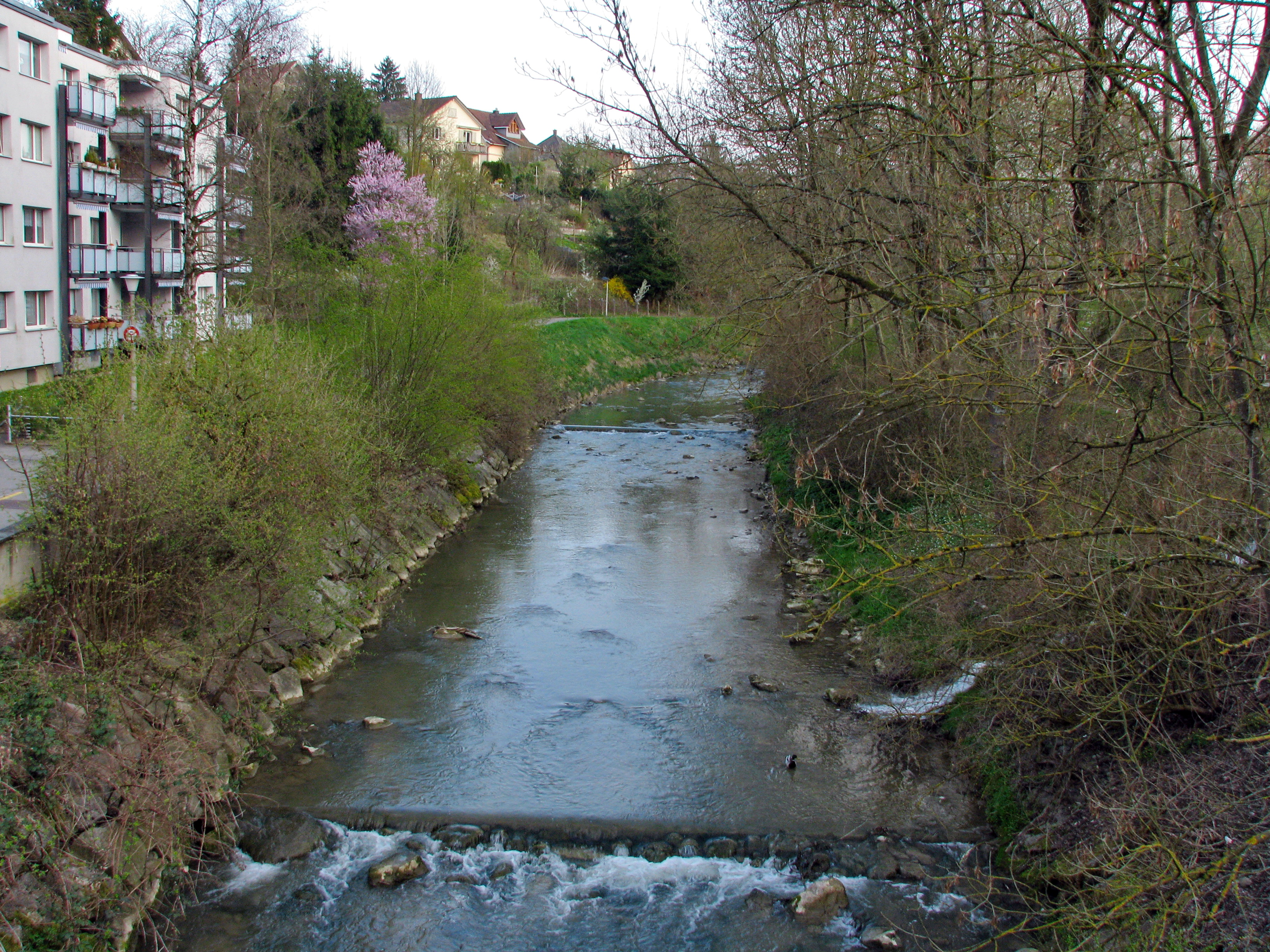
- Reppisch in Dietikon

Location
- Country: Switzerland

Physical characteristics
- Mouth: Limmat
  - coordinates: 47.4161°N 8.4050°E

Basin features
- Progression: Limmat→ Aare→ Rhine→ North Sea

The Reppisch (Swiss Standard German pronunciation: [ˈrɛpɪʃ]) is a river in Switzerland. It rises in the Türlersee and joins the Limmat as its tributary, near the town of Dietikon. The Reppisch flows in the Säuliamt (Affoltern district), canton of Zürich, an area featuring still partially untouched nature.

Between Birmensdorf and Dietikon, the river crosses a narrow valley which is used as a target range by the Swiss army troops stationed in the infantry barracks nearby. Therefore, this valley may be closed to entry during some parts of the week.

Shortly before entering Dietikon, the river underruns the Mutschellenpassstrasse and the Bremgarten-Dietikon-Bahn railway. In the spring of 1999, there were heavy floods in this area, blocking the road and the railway service for several days.

== Tributaries ==
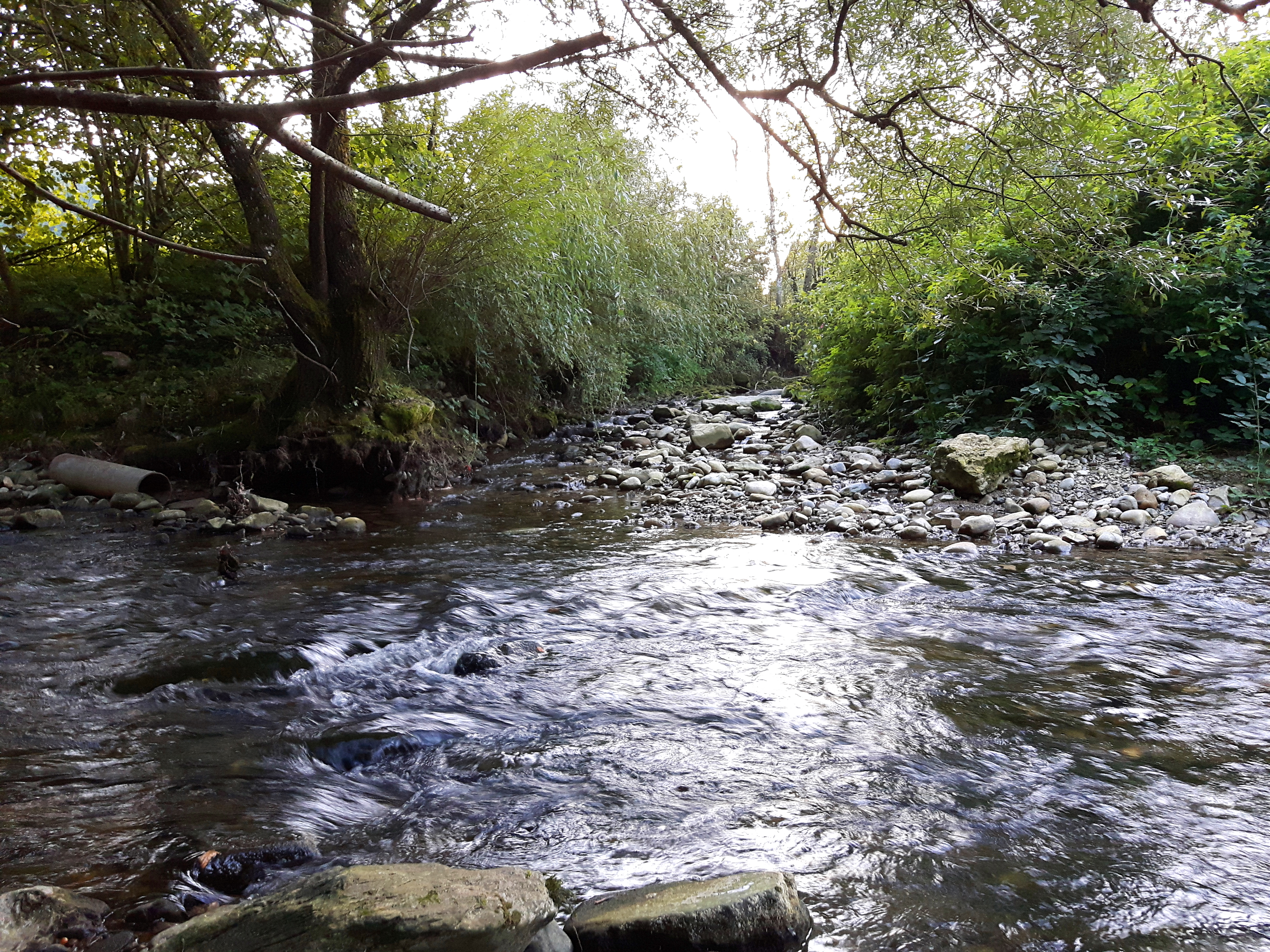
Mouth of the Rummelbach (behind) into the Reppisch (from left to right) at low water

Sixty eight named streams empty into the Reppisch, of which three, namely the Wüeribach, the Rummelbach and the Lunnerenbach, are 4 or more kilometres long. In addition there are 5 tributaries that are 2 kilometres long or more: the Dönibach, the Lättenbach, the Schwandenbach, the Tobelbach near Birmensdorf and the Malefizgraben, if one includes its right hand headstream, the Weidbach.

The most important tributary of the Reppisch is the roughly 8-kilometre-long Wüeribach, which drains the plain of Wettswil and Bonstetten and empties into the Reppisch near Birmensdorf from the left.

== See also ==
- List of rivers of Switzerland
