= Birmensdorf =

- Municipality
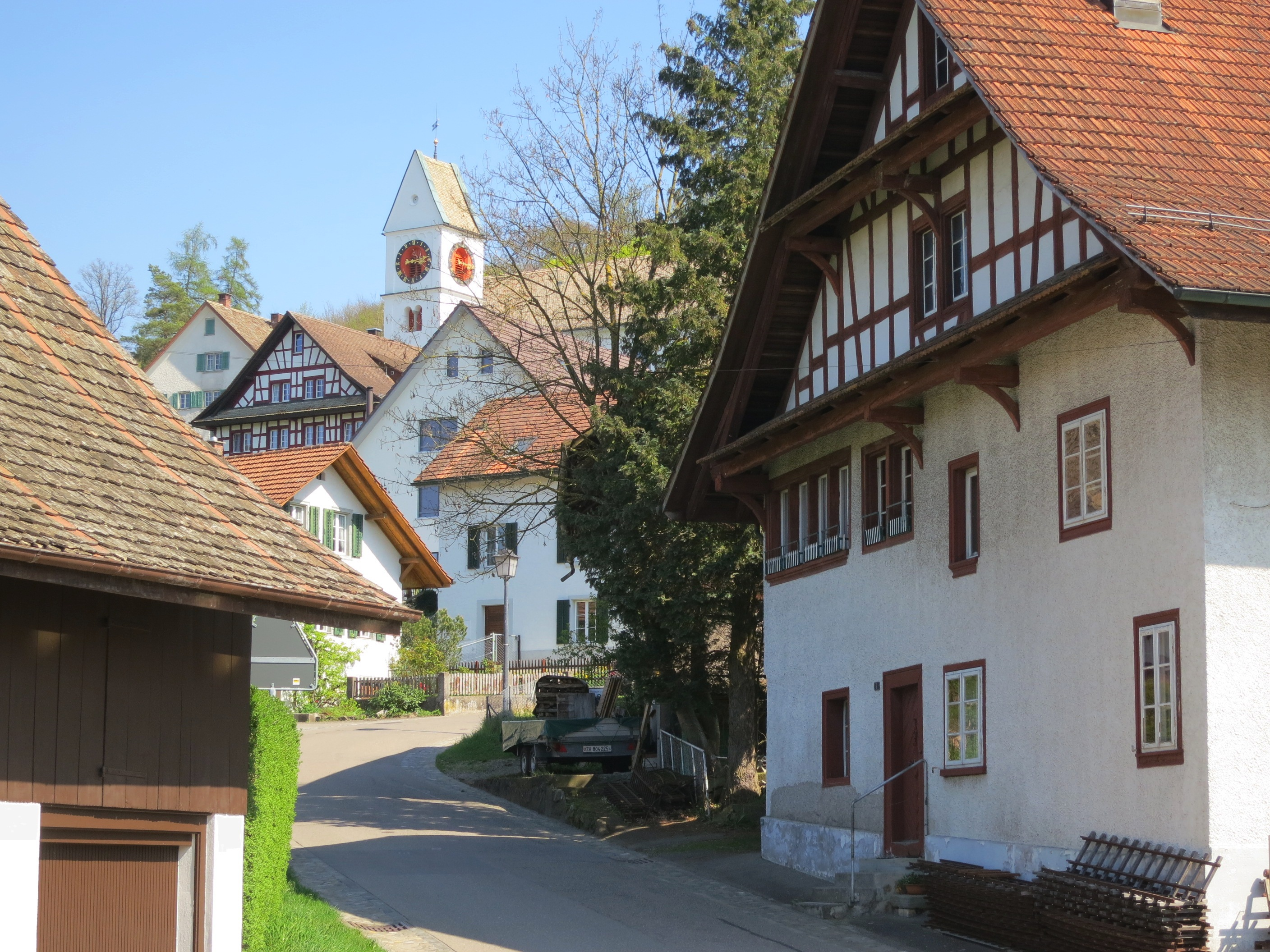

- Flag Coat of arms
- Location of Birmensdorf
- Location within Switzerland Location within Canton of Zurich
- Coordinates: 47°21′N 8°26′E
- Country: Switzerland
- Canton: Zurich
- District: Dietikon

Area
  - Total: 11.38 km^{2} (4.39 sq mi)
- Elevation: 518 m (1,699 ft)

Population (December 2020)
  - Total: 6,909
  - Density: 607.1/km^{2} (1,572/sq mi)
- Time zone: UTC+01:00 (CET)
  - Summer (DST): UTC+02:00 (CEST)
- Postal code: 8903
- SFOS number: 242
- ISO 3166 code: CH-ZH
- Surrounded by: Aesch (ZH), Berikon (AG), Bonstetten, Oberwil-Lieli (AG), Rudolfstetten-Friedlisberg (AG), Stallikon, Uitikon, Urdorf, Wettswil am Albis
- Website: www.birmensdorf.ch

Birmensdorf is a municipality in the district of Dietikon in the canton of Zürich in Switzerland.

== History ==
Birmensdorf is first mentioned in 876 as Piripoumesdorf.

== Geography ==
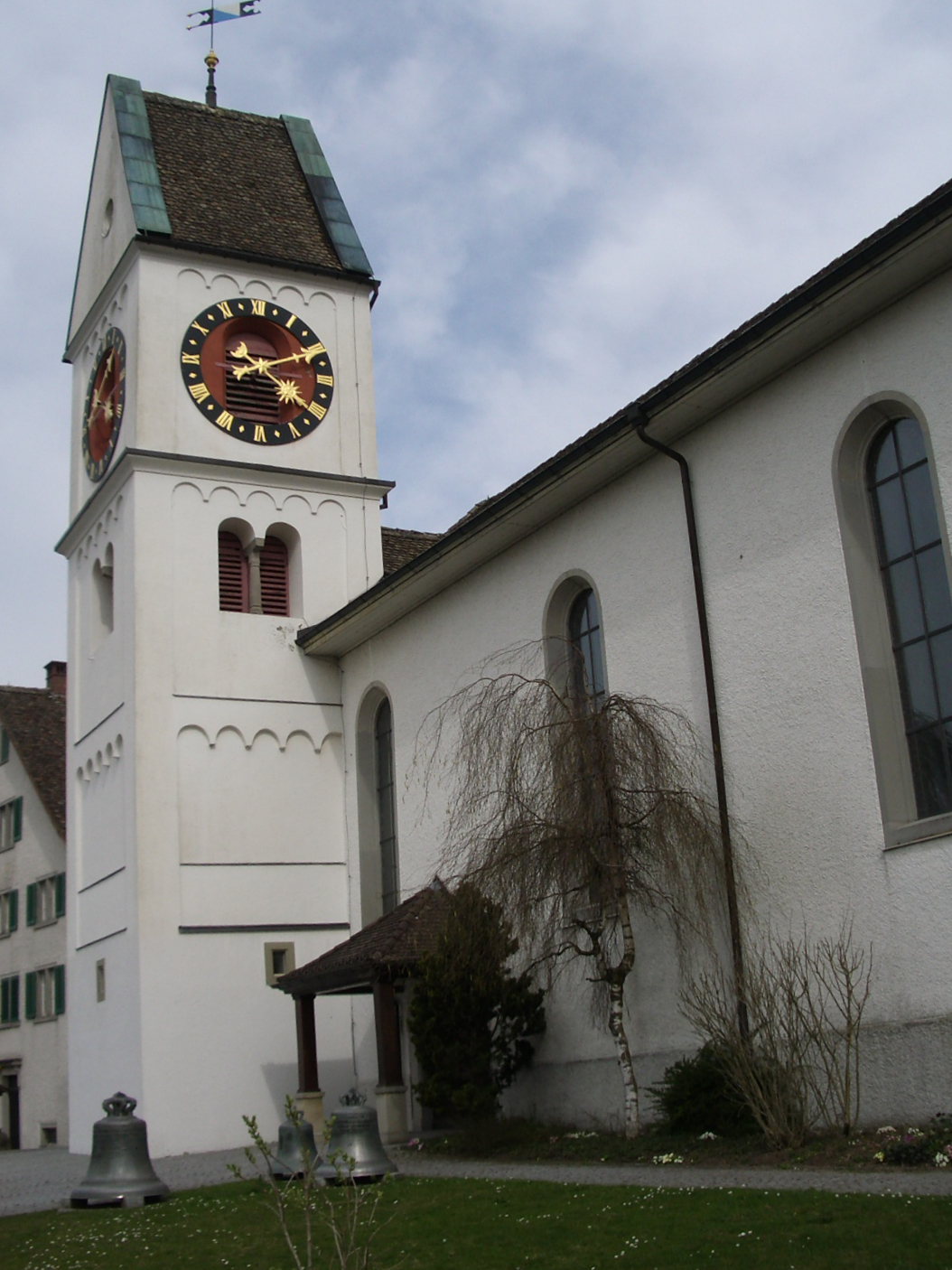
Birmensdorf church

Aerial view by Walter Mittelholzer (1932)

Birmensdorf has an area of 11.5 km^{2} (4.4 sq mi). Of this area, 41% is used for agricultural purposes, while 38.3% is forested. Of the rest of the land, 20.2% is settled (buildings or roads) and the remainder (0.5%) is non-productive (rivers, glaciers or mountains). In 1996 housing and buildings made up 12.8% of the total area, while transportation infrastructure made up the rest (7.3%). Of the total unproductive area, water (streams and lakes) made up 0.4% of the area. As of 2007 14.1% of the total municipal area was undergoing some type of construction.

The municipality is located in the Reppischtal. It includes the hamlet of Landikon and numerous scattered farm houses. The village of Birmensdorf includes the former hamlets of Wullikon, Schüren, Güpf, Uf Dorf and Risi.

The Wüeribach stream empties into the Reppisch near Birmensdorf.

== Demographics ==
Birmensdorf has a population (as of 31 December 2020) of 6,909. As of 2023, 26.8% of the population was made up of foreign nationals, and the gender distribution of the population was 49.8% male and 50.2% female. From 2018 until 2023, the population grew by 11.5%. As of 2019 there are 2977 households in Birmensdorf, with the average size of one household being 2.23 people. Most of the population (as of 2000) speaks German (87.1%), with Italian being second most common ( 2.6%) and French being third ( 1.4%).

In the federal election of 2023 the voting distribution was: SVP (33.3%), SP (15.2%), FDP (13.6%), GLP (12.3%), The Center (11%) and GPS (7.8%).

The age distribution of the population, as of 2019, is children and teenagers (0–19 years old) who make up 20.9% of the population, while adults (20–64 years old) make up 60% and seniors (65 years old and over) make up 19.2%. The entire Swiss population is generally well educated. In Birmensdorf about 80.3% of the population (between age 25-64) have completed either non-mandatory upper secondary education or additional higher education (either university or a Fachhochschule).

Birmensdorf has an unemployment rate of 2.02%. As of 2024, most people in the municipality don't work in it, since there are only 417-432 jobs in the municipality. Most people who work in the municipality (As of 2022), work in the tertiary sector with 340 being employed in it, followed by the secondary sector with 74 people employed in it and the primary sector with 18 people employed in it.

As of 2008 there were 1738 Catholics and 2227 Protestants in Birmensdorf. In the 2000 census religion was broken down into several smaller categories. From the 2000 census, 46.5% were some type of Protestant, with 44.6% belonging to the Swiss Reformed Church and 1.9% belonging to other Protestant churches. 30.1% of the population were Catholic. Of the rest of the population, 0% were Muslim, 5.2% belonged to another religion (not listed), 3.2% did not give a religion, and 14% were atheist or agnostic.

The historical population is given in the following table:

year	population
1634	460
1749	848
1836	1,082
1850	1,096
1900	1,101
1950	1,480
2000	5,451

== Transport ==
Birmensdorf railway station is a stop of the Zürich S-Bahn on the lines S5 and S14. It is an 18 minute ride from Zürich Hauptbahnhof.

The municipality is located on the A3 motorway.
