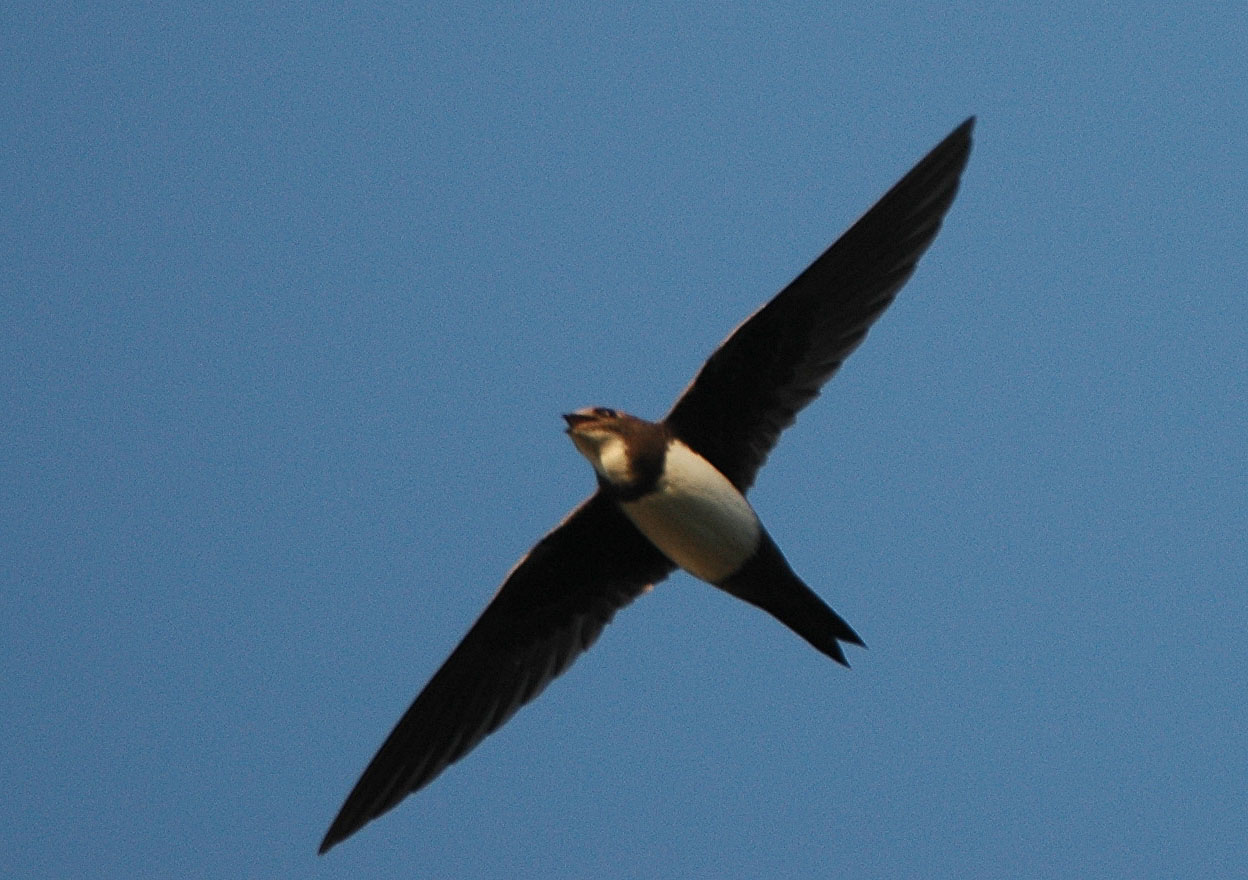
- Alpine swift, Tachymarptis melba

Scientific classification
- Kingdom: Animalia
- Phylum: Chordata
- Class: Aves
- Order: Apodiformes
- Family: Apodidae
- Tribe: Apodini
- Genus: Tachymarptis; Roberts, 1922

Type species
- Hirundo melba Linnaeus, 1758

Species
- T. melba; T. aequatorialis

= Tachymarptis =

Genus of birds

Tachymarptis is a genus of bird in the swift family, Apodidae. It contains the Alpine swift (Tachymarptis melba) of Eurasia and Africa and the mottled swift (Tachymarptis aequatorialis) of Africa. They are large swifts with relatively broad wings, a large head, a medium-length forked tail and white in the underparts.

== Taxonomy ==
The genus Tachymarptis was introduced in 1922 by the South African zoologist Austin Roberts with Hirundo melba Linnaeus, 1758, the alpine swift, as the type species. The name Tachymarptis comes from Greek takhus ("fast") and marptis ("seizer").

The genus contains two species:

- Alpine swift, Tachymarptis melba
- Mottled swift, Tachymarptis aequatorialis

They are often included in the genus Apus but they are larger than other members of that genus, their nestlings have a different foot structure and they host different species of feather lice. The species placed in Tachymarptis are not deeply nested inside Apus but represent a monophyletic sister lineage to this genus, in order that they can either be regarded as a distinct genus or lumped into a genus Apus with a broader definition. This latter view is the one retained by the Clements Checklist (2022).
