= Swiss Ornithological Institute =

Non-profit ornithology organization

Swiss Ornithological Institute in Sempach
- Formation: 1924
- Type: Non-profit foundation
- Purpose: Non-profit foundation for studies of wild birds
- Location: Sempach
- Fields: Studies of wild birds
- Staff: 130
- Volunteers: 2000
- Website: https://www.vogelwarte.ch/en

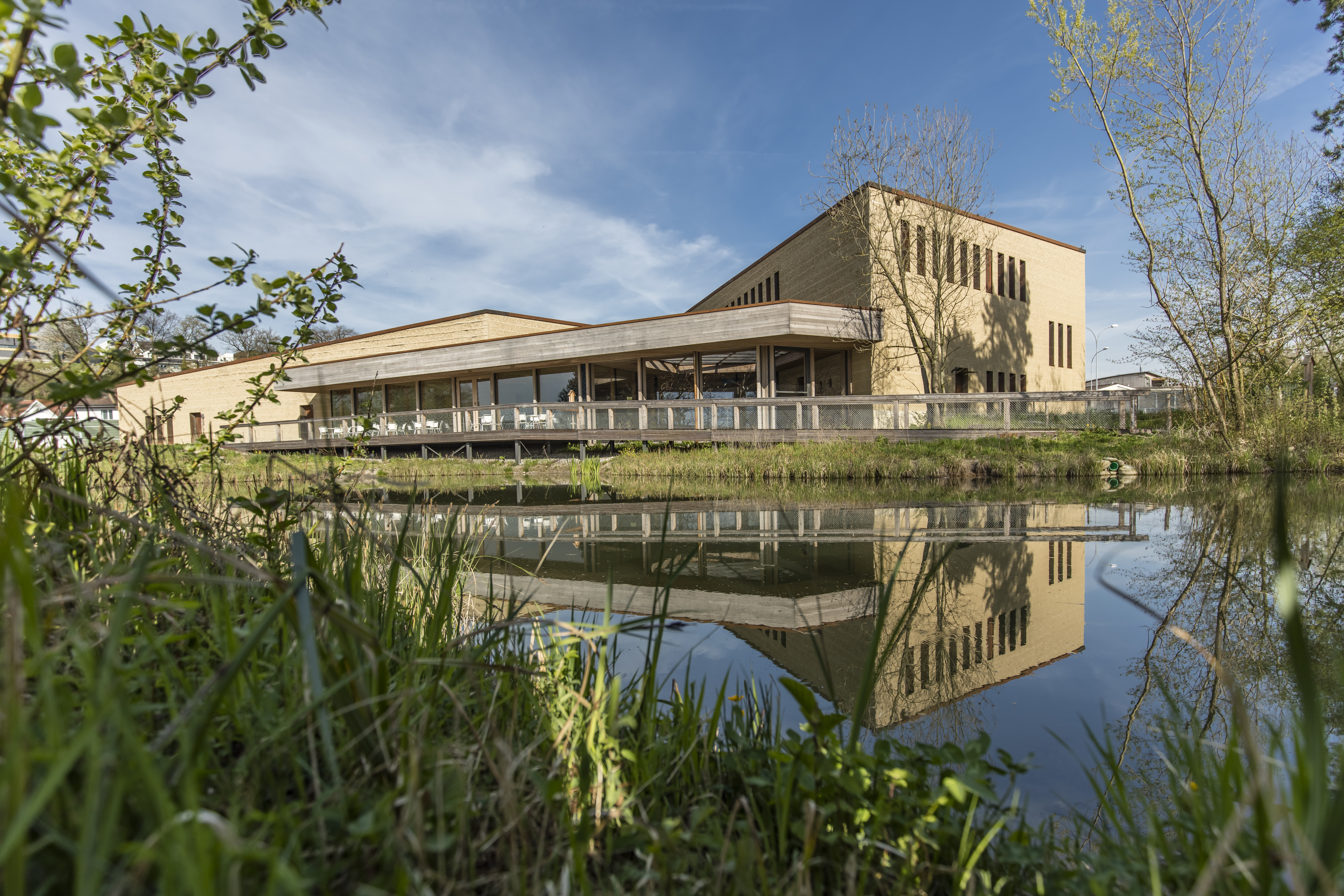
The Swiss Ornithological Institute's visitor centre, opened in 2015

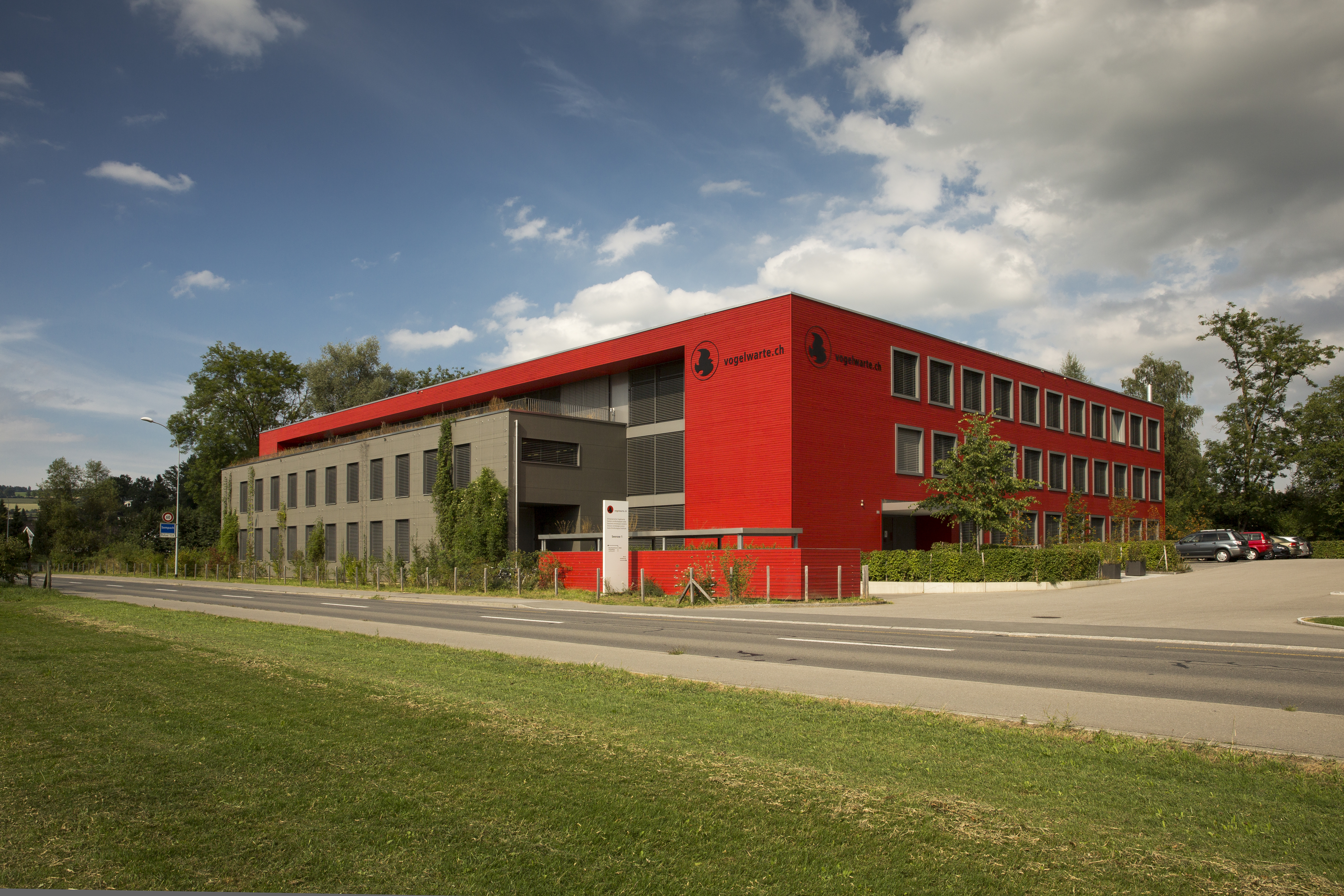
The Office building of the Swiss Ornithological Institute in Sempach

The Swiss Ornithological Institute (German: Schweizerische Vogelwarte Sempach) is a non-profit foundation headquartered in Sempach in the district of Sursee in the canton of Lucerne in Switzerland dedicated to the study and conservation of birds.

The Swiss Ornithological Institute was founded in 1924 as a ringing station for researching bird migration in the Alpine region. Since then, it has grown from a one-man volunteer operation into an internationally recognised institute with more than 130 employees. In 1954, the Swiss Ornithological Institute was registered as an independent foundation under Swiss law. In 1955, it moved from the town hall in Sempach to a new building on Lake Sempach. Since 1958, the institute has also operated a bird ringing station on Col de Bretolet at 1923 m asl. The Swiss Ornithological Institute is a member of the European Union for Bird Ringing (EURING).

The Swiss Ornithological Institute monitors Switzerland's native birdlife, studies the behaviour of wild birds and seeks to understand the threats they face. It develops protection and conservation measures for threatened species and, together with its partners, works to ensure that the results of its research are used for the benefit of nature and birds. The Swiss Ornithological Institute operates a care centre for sick, injured and orphaned birds. As a national centre of expertise in ornithology and conservation, it also provides information and consulting services to the public, the media and the authorities. The institute offers programmes for schools and environmental education services to raise awareness for the protection of birds, a purpose primarily served by the state-of-the-art visitor centre that opened in 2015. The three-storey loam construction is the first of its kind in Switzerland.

The private status of the Swiss Ornithological Institute is unique and distinguishes it from other ornithological institutes, many of which are governmental organisations. The Swiss Ornithological Institute is funded by donations and can count on more than 2,000 volunteers to support its nationwide bird-monitoring programmes.

== See also ==
- Science and technology in Switzerland
