= Niederriedsee =

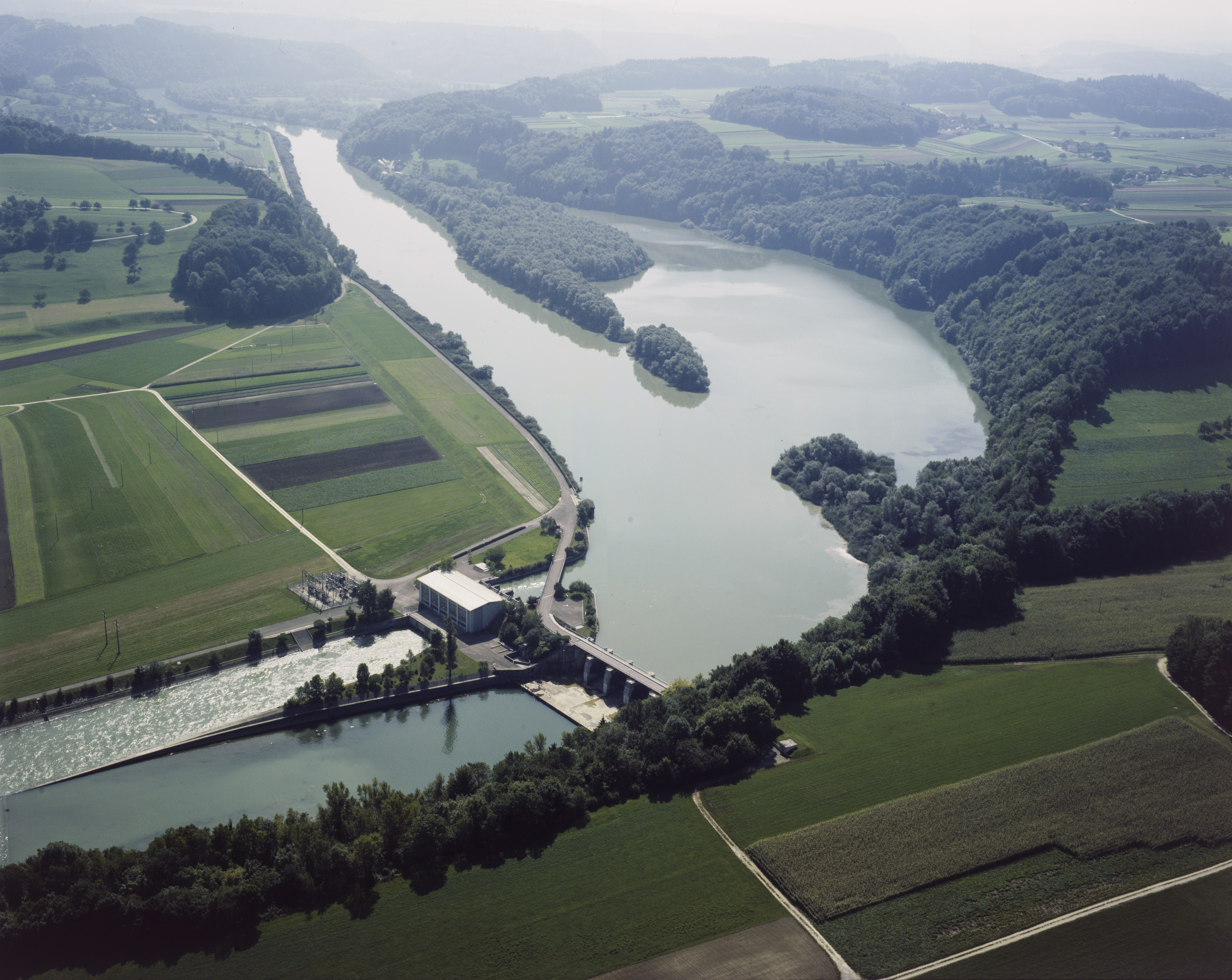

- Location within Canton of Bern Location within Switzerland Location within Alps
- Interactive map of Niederriedsee
- Location: Canton of Bern
- Coordinates: 46°59′52″N 7°14′28″E
- Type: reservoir
- Primary inflows: Aare
- Primary outflows: Aare
- Basin countries: Switzerland
- Surface area: 1.5 km^{2} (0.58 sq mi)
- Max. depth: 8 m (26 ft)
- Surface elevation: 461 m (1,512 ft)

Ramsar Wetland
- Official name: Niederried Stausee
- Designated: 9 November 1990
- Reference no.: 508

Niederriedsee (or Stausee Niederried) is a reservoir formed by the Niederried dam on the Aar River in the canton of Bern, Switzerland. It is named after the nearby village Niederried bei Kallnach.

== See also ==
- List of lakes of Switzerland
