= Lake Wohlen =

Lake Wohlen Wohlensee
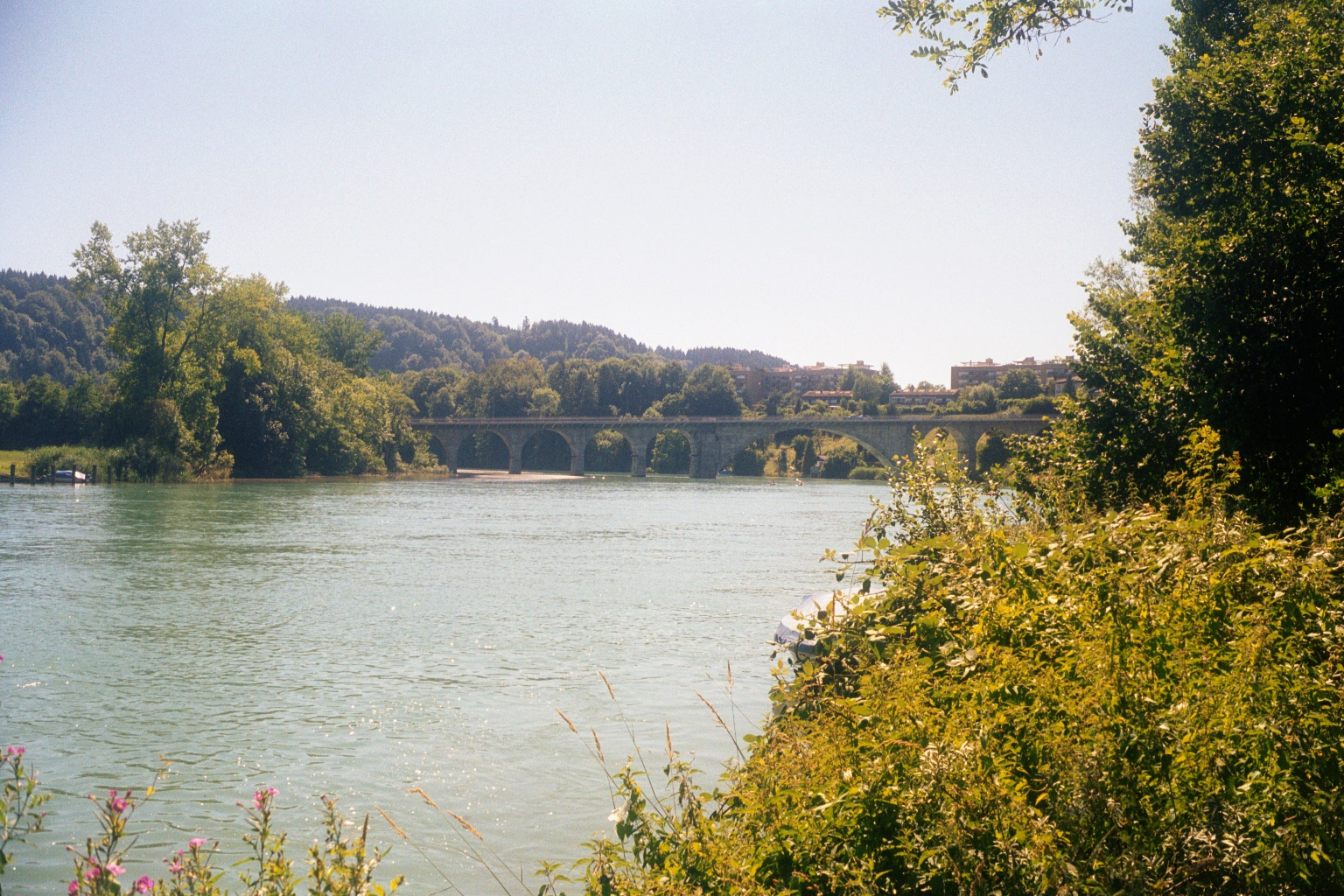
- near Bern

- Location within Canton of Bern Location within Switzerland Location within Alps
- Interactive map of Lake Wohlen; Wohlensee
- Location: Canton of Bern
- Coordinates: 46°58′06″N 7°17′04″E
- Type: reservoir
- Primary inflows: Aare
- Primary outflows: Aare
- Catchment area: 3,202 km^{2} (1,236 sq mi)
- Basin countries: Switzerland
- Max. length: 8 km (5.0 mi)
- Max. width: 700 m (2,300 ft)
- Surface area: 3.65 km^{2} (1.41 sq mi)
- Max. depth: 20 m (66 ft)
- Water volume: 25 million cubic metres (20,000 acre⋅ft)
- Residence time: 2.1 days
- Surface elevation: 481 m (1,578 ft)
- Islands: Island in Lake Wohlen (islet)
- Settlements: Wohlen bei Bern

Lake Wohlen (German: Wohlensee) is a reservoir in the Canton of Bern, Switzerland. Its surface is approximately 3.65 km² and its maximum depth is 20 m. It lies between the towns of Bremgarten bei Bern and Mühleberg. Lake Wohlen was completed in 1920.

== See also ==
- List of lakes of Switzerland
