= Klingnauer Stausee =

Reservoir near Böttstein, canton of Aargau, Switzerland

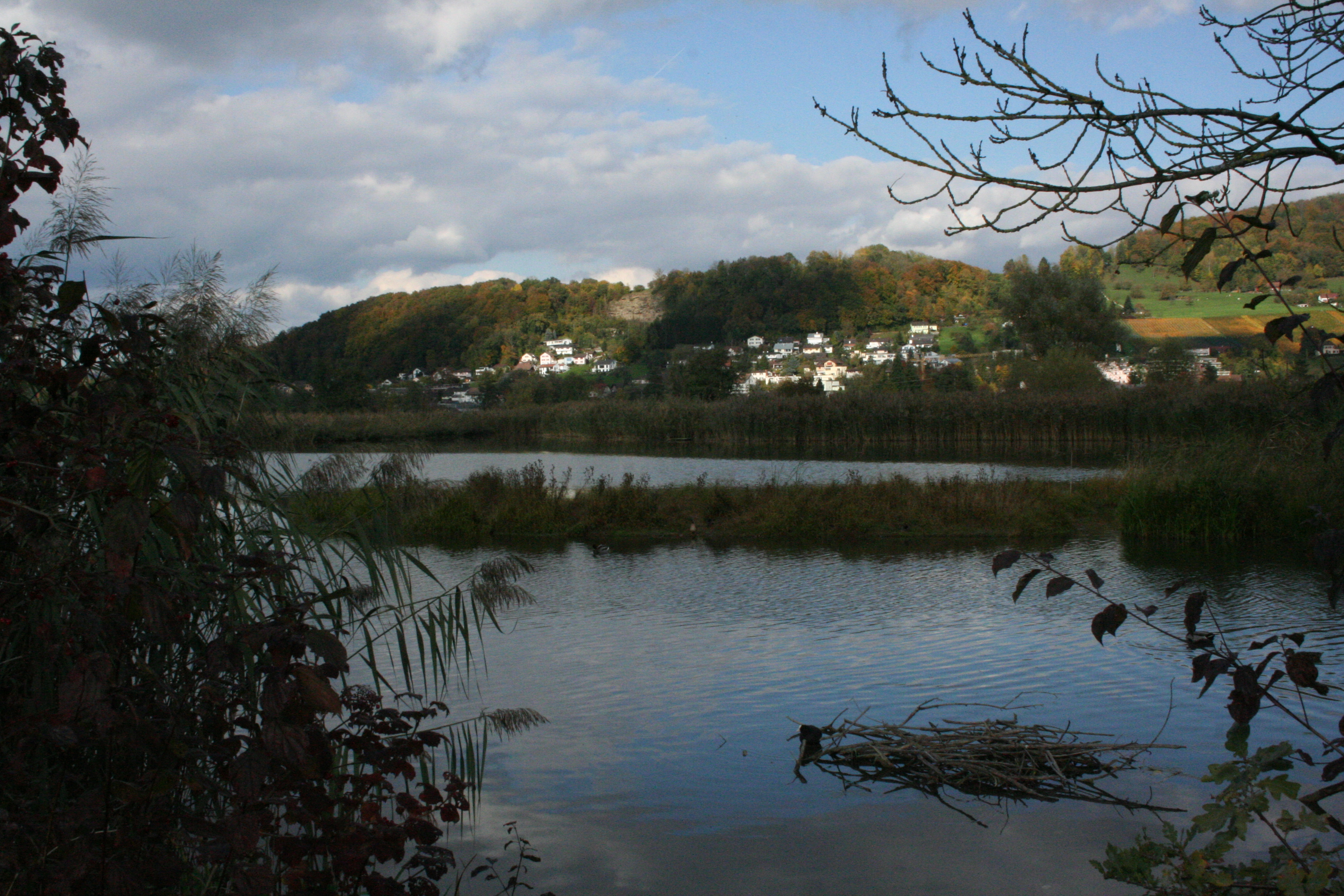

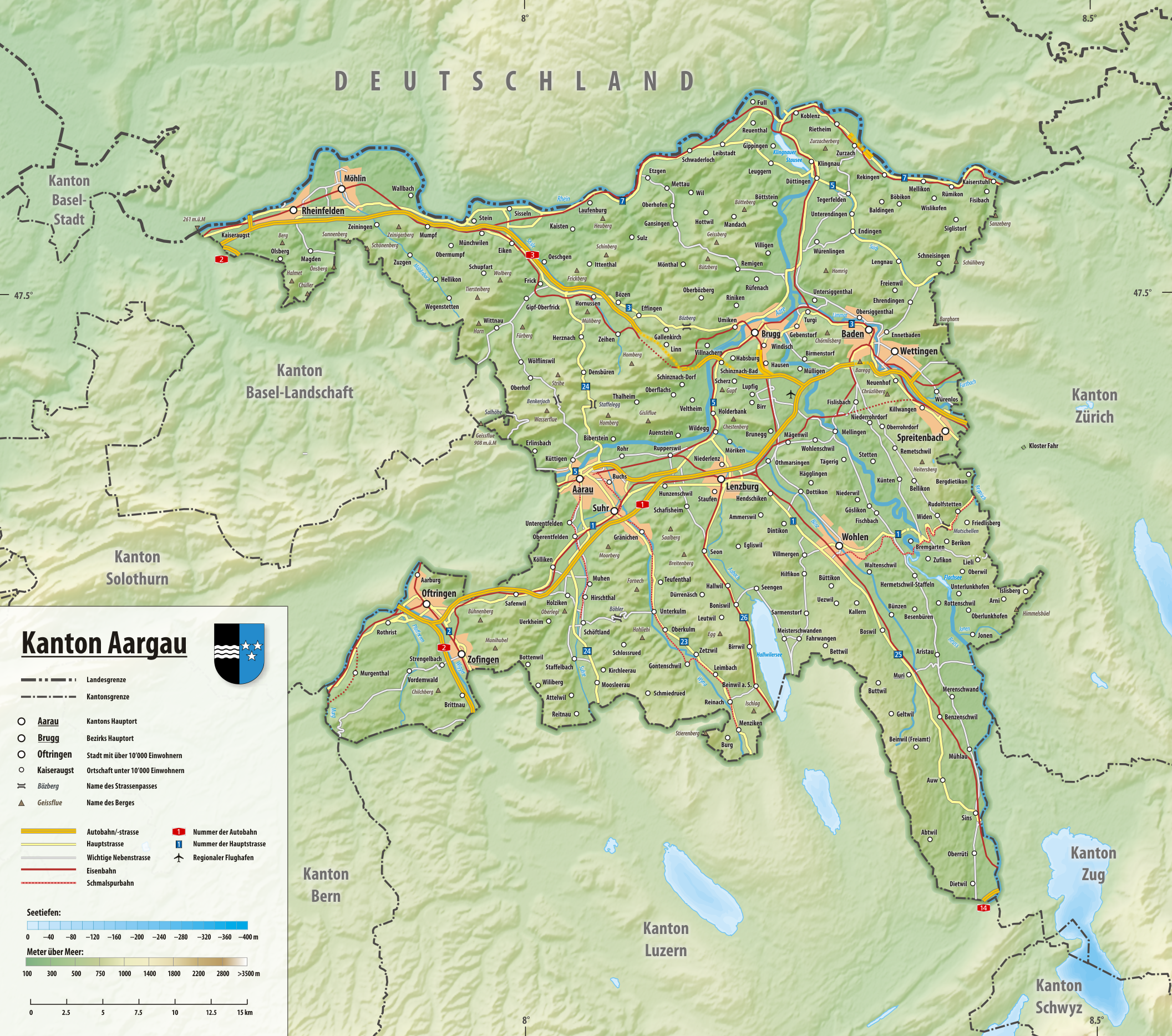
- Location within Canton of Aargau Location within Switzerland Location within Alps
- Interactive map of Klingnauer Stausee
- Location: Aargau
- Coordinates: 47°35′N 8°14′E
- Type: reservoir
- Primary inflows: Aare
- Primary outflows: Aare
- Basin countries: Switzerland
- Max. length: 3 km (1.9 mi)
- Max. width: 500 m (1,600 ft)
- Surface area: 1.16 km^{2} (0.45 sq mi)
- Max. depth: 8.5 m (28 ft)
- Surface elevation: 318 m (1,043 ft)
- Islands: 1
- Settlements: Döttingen, Klingnau

Ramsar Wetland
- Designated: 9 November 1990
- Reference no.: 507

The Klingnauer Stausee (or "Klingnau reservoir") is a reservoir near Böttstein, canton of Aargau, Switzerland, at 47°35′N 8°14′E. The reservoir with a surface of 1.16 km^{2} (0.45 sq mi) was formed at the construction of a power plant on the Aare river in the 1930s.

== See also ==
- List of lakes of Switzerland
