= Col de Bretolet =

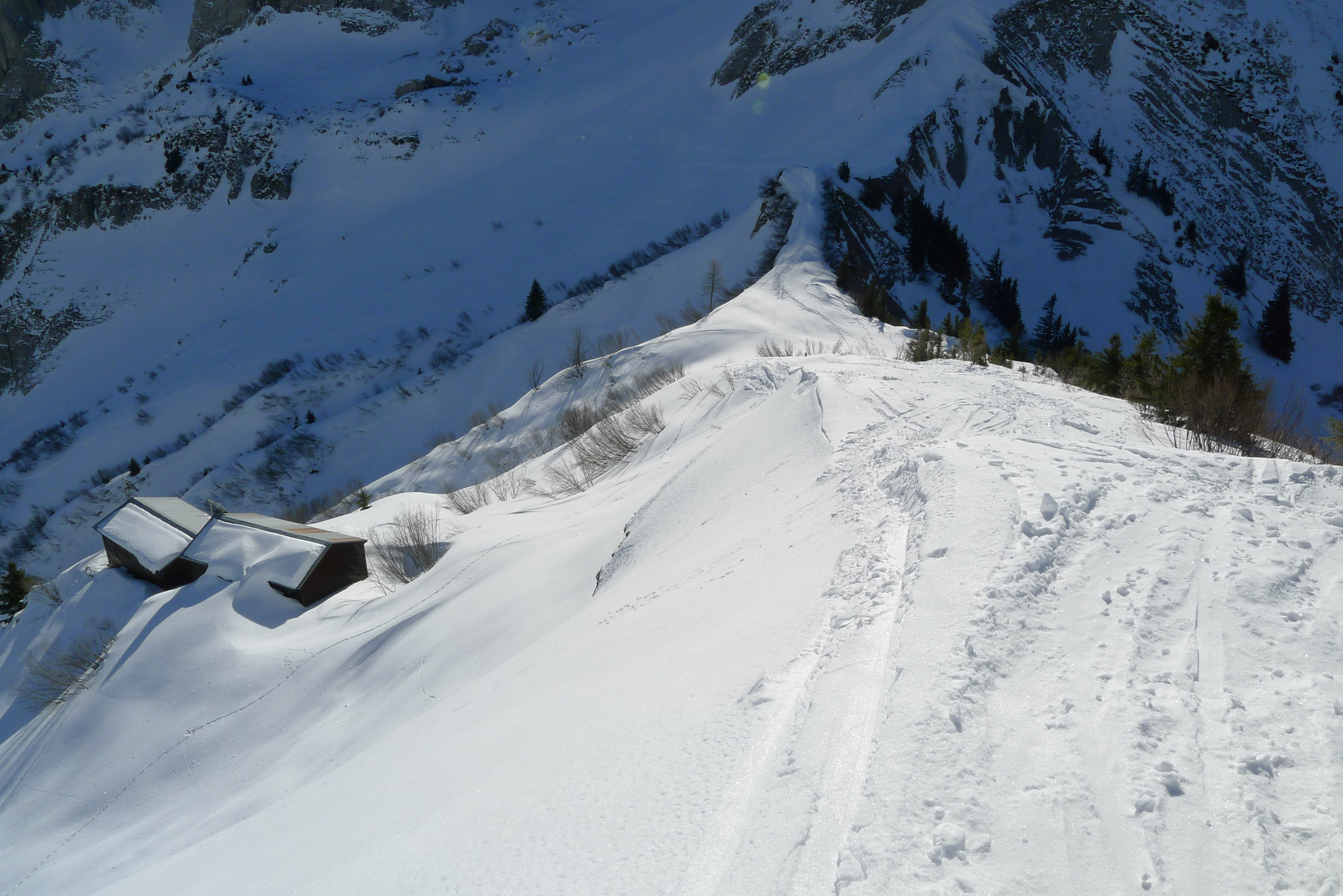
- Col De Bertolet
- Interactive map of Col de Bretolet
- Elevation: 1,923 metres (6,309 ft)

Third Approach
- Location: France–Switzerland border
- Range: Pennine Alps
- Coordinates: 46°08′33″N 6°47′46″E

The Col de Bretolet is a mountain pass in the Swiss Alps in the canton of Valais, close to the border between Switzerland and the French department of Haute-Savoie. It lies above the village of Champéry at an altitude of 1923 m asl within a 567 ha nature reserve (IUCN management category IV) set aside for the protection and study of migratory birds. It contains a bird ringing station operated by the Sempach Bird Observatory (Swiss Ornithological Institute).

== Bird research ==
The Col de Bretolet is located on a bird migration route through which many thousands of birds pass, especially from early August to late October, with many travelling at night. In 1958 a long-term bird ringing program began in order to monitor autumn migration in the Swiss Alps and study energy metabolism, passerine moult and changes in migration patterns in relation to global climate change, as well as documenting irruptions of jays, tits and finches, comparing data with other ringing sites elsewhere and educating ringers.

Birds are caught both by day and at night in mist nets as they fly through the pass. On foggy nights the birds are attracted to the nets with the use of bright lights. As well as birds, bats are caught, and the pass is also well known for the migration of insects, notably moths and hoverflies.
