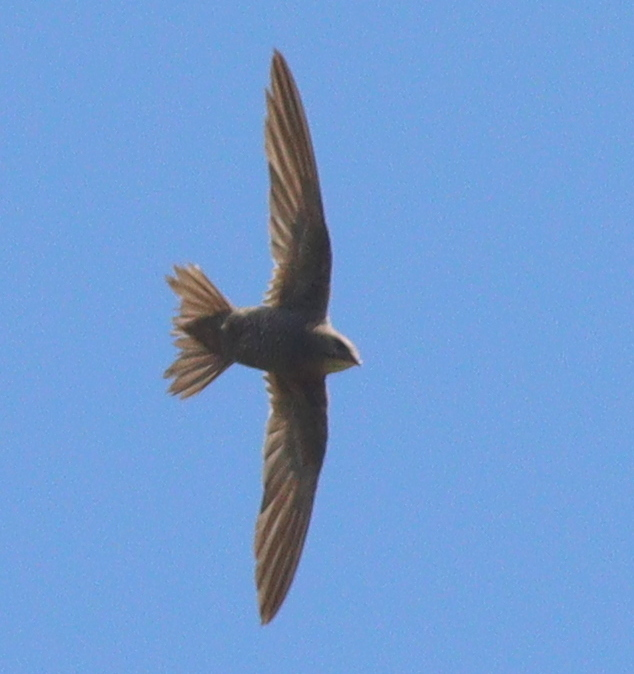

Conservation status
- Least Concern (IUCN 3.1)

Scientific classification
- Kingdom: Animalia
- Phylum: Chordata
- Class: Aves
- Clade: Strisores
- Order: Apodiformes
- Family: Apodidae
- Genus: Tachymarptis
- Species: T. aequatorialis

Binomial name
- Tachymarptis aequatorialis (von Müller, 1851)

Synonyms
- Apus aequatorialis

= Mottled swift =

Species of bird

The mottled swift (Tachymarptis aequatorialis) is a species of bird in the swift family, Apodidae. It is very sparsely distributed in Sub-Saharan Africa, although more so throughout East Africa.

Jali Makawa noted that the Alomwe people hunted these swifts by swirling long bamboo poles above them to swat the swifts down. Makawa and C.W. Benson tasted these birds and found them palatable.
