= Aare =

River in Switzerland

Aare Aar
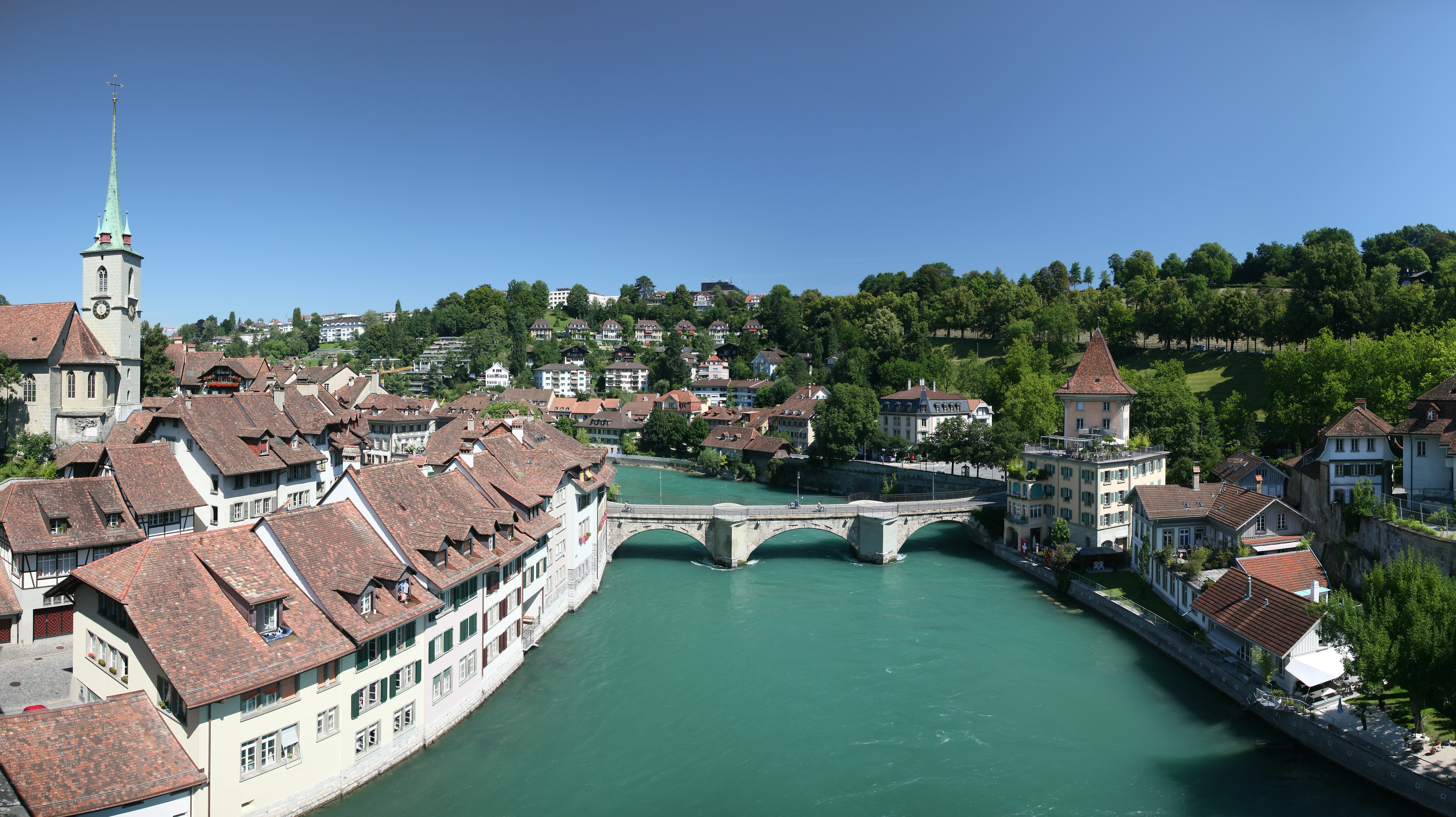
- The Aare at Bern

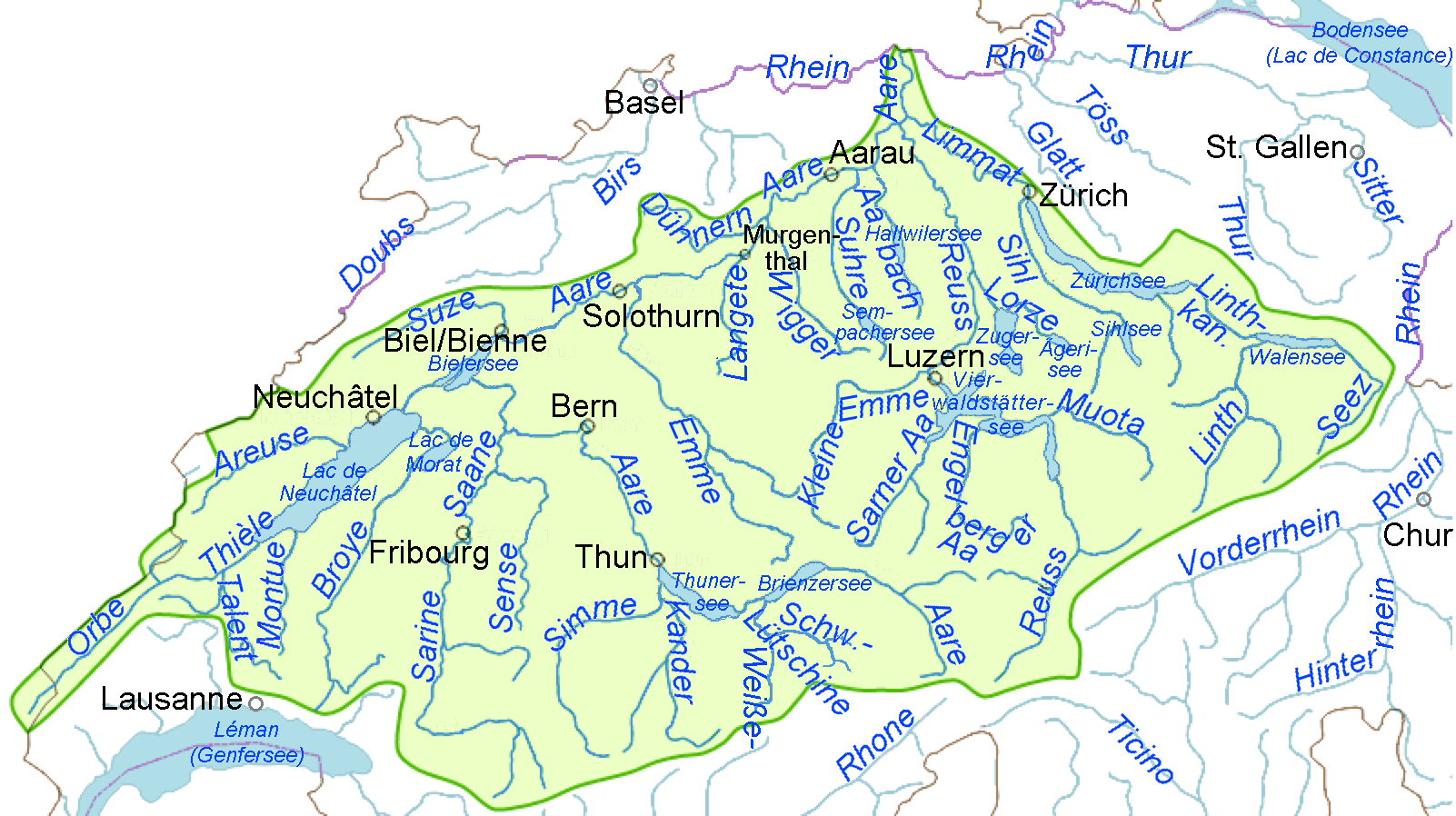
- Drainage basin of the Aare

- Mouth

Location
- Country: Switzerland
- Cantons: Bern, Solothurn, Aargau
- Settlements: Meiringen (BE), Interlaken (BE), Thun (BE), Münsingen, Muri bei Bern, Bern, Bremgarten bei Bern, Aarberg (BE), Büren a.A. (BE), Solothurn (SO), Aarwangen (BE), Aarburg (BE), Olten (SO), Niedergösgen (SO), Schönenwerd (SO), Aarau (AG), Wildegg (AG), Brugg (AG), Windisch (AG), Döttingen (AG), Klingnau (AG)

Physical characteristics
- Source
  - location: Unteraar Glacier, Bernese Oberland
  - coordinates: 46°34′12″N 8°11′24″E
  - elevation: 1,940 m (6,360 ft)
- Mouth
  - location: Rhine below Koblenz, Switzerland
  - coordinates: 47°36′18″N 8°13′24″E
  - elevation: 311 m (1,020 ft)
- Length: 291.5 kilometres (181.1 mi)
- Basin size: 17,779 km^{2} (6,865 sq mi)
- Discharge
  - location: Untersiggenthal
  - average: 559 m^{3}/s (19,700 cu ft/s) (MQ 1935-2013)
  - minimum: 351 m^{3}/s (12,400 cu ft/s) (MNQ 1935-2013), 138 m^{3}/s (4,900 cu ft/s) (NNQ, 1963)
  - maximum: 735 m^{3}/s (26,000 cu ft/s) (MHQ 1935-2013), 2,656 m^{3}/s (93,800 cu ft/s) (HHQ, 2007)

Basin features
- Progression: Rhine→ North Sea
- Tributaries
  - left: Lütschine (Lake Brienz), Kander (Lake Thun), Gürbe, Saane/La Sarine, Zihl/La Thielle (Lakes of Neuchatel and Bienne), La Suze (Lake of Bienne), Dünnern
  - right: Gadmerwasser, Zulg, Emme, Murg, Wigger, Suhre, Aabach, Reuss, Limmat, Surb
- Waterbodies: Oberaarsee, Grimselsee, Räterichsbodensee, Lake Brienz, Lake Thun, Wohlensee, Lake Biel, Stausee Niederried, Klingnauer Stausee

The Aare (Swiss Standard German: [ˈaːrɛ]) or Aar (French: [aʁ]; Swiss Standard German: [aːr]) is the main tributary of the High Rhine (its discharge even exceeds that of the latter at their confluence) and the longest river that both rises and ends entirely within Switzerland.

Its total length from its source to its junction with the Rhine comprises about 295 kilometres (183 mi), during which distance it descends 1,565 m (5,135 ft), draining an area of 17,779 km^{2} (6,865 sq mi), almost entirely within Switzerland, and accounting for close to half the area of the country, including all of Central Switzerland.

There are more than 40 hydroelectric plants along the course of the Aare.

The river's name dates to at least the La Tène period, and it is attested as Nantaror "Aare valley" in the Berne zinc tablet.

The name was Latinized as Arula/Arola/Araris. (Note: The river Obringa, mentioned by Ptolemy (2.7.9) as a tributary of the Rhine, has been identified with either the Mosel or the Aare.)

== Course ==
The Aare rises in the great Aargletschers (Aare Glaciers) of the Bernese Alps, in the canton of Bern and west of the Grimsel Pass. The Finsteraargletscher and Lauteraargletscher come together to form the Unteraargletscher (Lower Aar Glacier), which is the main source of water for the Grimselsee (Lake of Grimsel). The Oberaargletscher (Upper Aar Glacier) feeds the Oberaarsee, which also flows into the Grimselsee. The Aare leaves the Grimselsee just to the east to the Grimsel Hospiz, below the Grimsel Pass, and then flows northwest through the Haslital, forming on the way the magnificent Handegg Waterfall, 46 m (151 ft), past Guttannen.

Right after Innertkirchen it is joined by its first major tributary, the Gamderwasser. Less than 1 kilometre (0.62 mi) later the river carves through a limestone ridge in the Aare Gorge (German: Aareschlucht). It is here that the Aare proves itself to be more than just a river, as it attracts thousands of tourists annually to the causeways through the gorge. A little past Meiringen, near Brienz, the river expands into Lake Brienz. Near the west end of the lake it indirectly receives its first important tributary, the Lütschine, by the Lake of Brienz. It then runs across the swampy plain of the Bödeli (Swiss German diminutive for ground) between Interlaken and Unterseen before flowing into Lake Thun.

Near the west end of Lake Thun, the river indirectly receives the waters of the Kander, which has just been joined by the Simme, by the Lake of Thun. Lake Thun marks the head of navigation. On flowing out of the lake it passes through Thun, and then flows through the city of Bern, passing beneath eighteen bridges and around the steeply-flanked peninsula on which the Old City is located. To the south of the Old City peninsula is the Mattenschwelle, a weir which provides water for the small Matte hydroelectric power plant. River swimming in the Aare is popular in Bern, and the river is sometimes full of bathers on summer days. The river soon changes its northwesterly flow for a due westerly direction, but after receiving the Saane or La Sarine it turns north until it nears Aarberg. There, in one of the major Swiss engineering feats of the 19th century, the Jura water correction, the river, which had previously rendered the countryside north of Bern a swampland through frequent flooding, was diverted by the Aare-Hagneck Canal into the Lac de Bienne. From the upper end of the lake, at Nidau, the river issues through the Nidau-Büren Canal, also called the Aare Canal, and then runs east to Büren. The lake absorbs huge amounts of eroded gravel and snowmelt that the river brings from the Alps, and the former swamps have become fruitful plains: they are known as the "vegetable garden of Switzerland".

From here the Aare flows northeast for a long distance, past the ambassador town Solothurn (below which the Grosse Emme flows in on the right), Aarburg (where it is joined by the Wigger), Olten, Aarau, near which is the junction with the Suhre, and Wildegg, where the Seetal Aabach falls in on the right. A short distance further, below Brugg, it receives first the Reuss, its major tributary, and shortly afterwards the Limmat, its second strongest tributary. It now turns due north, and soon becomes itself a tributary of the Rhine, which it even surpasses in volume when the two rivers unite downstream from Koblenz (Switzerland), opposite Waldshut in Germany. The Rhine, in turn, empties into the North Sea after crossing into the Netherlands.

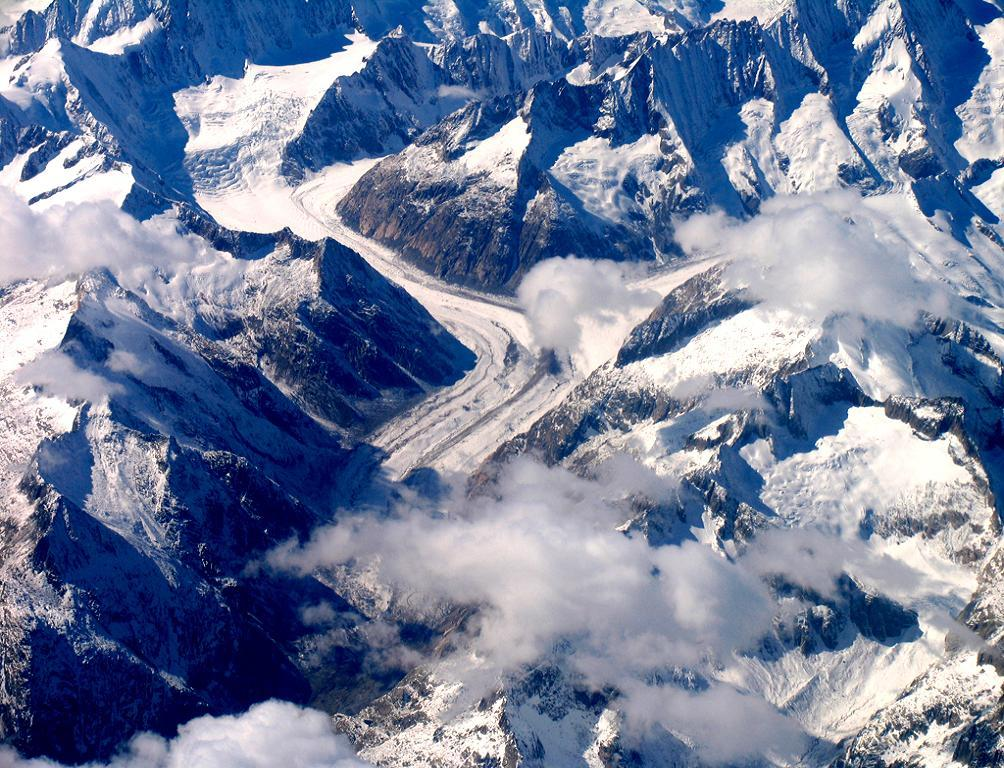
The Unteraargletscher

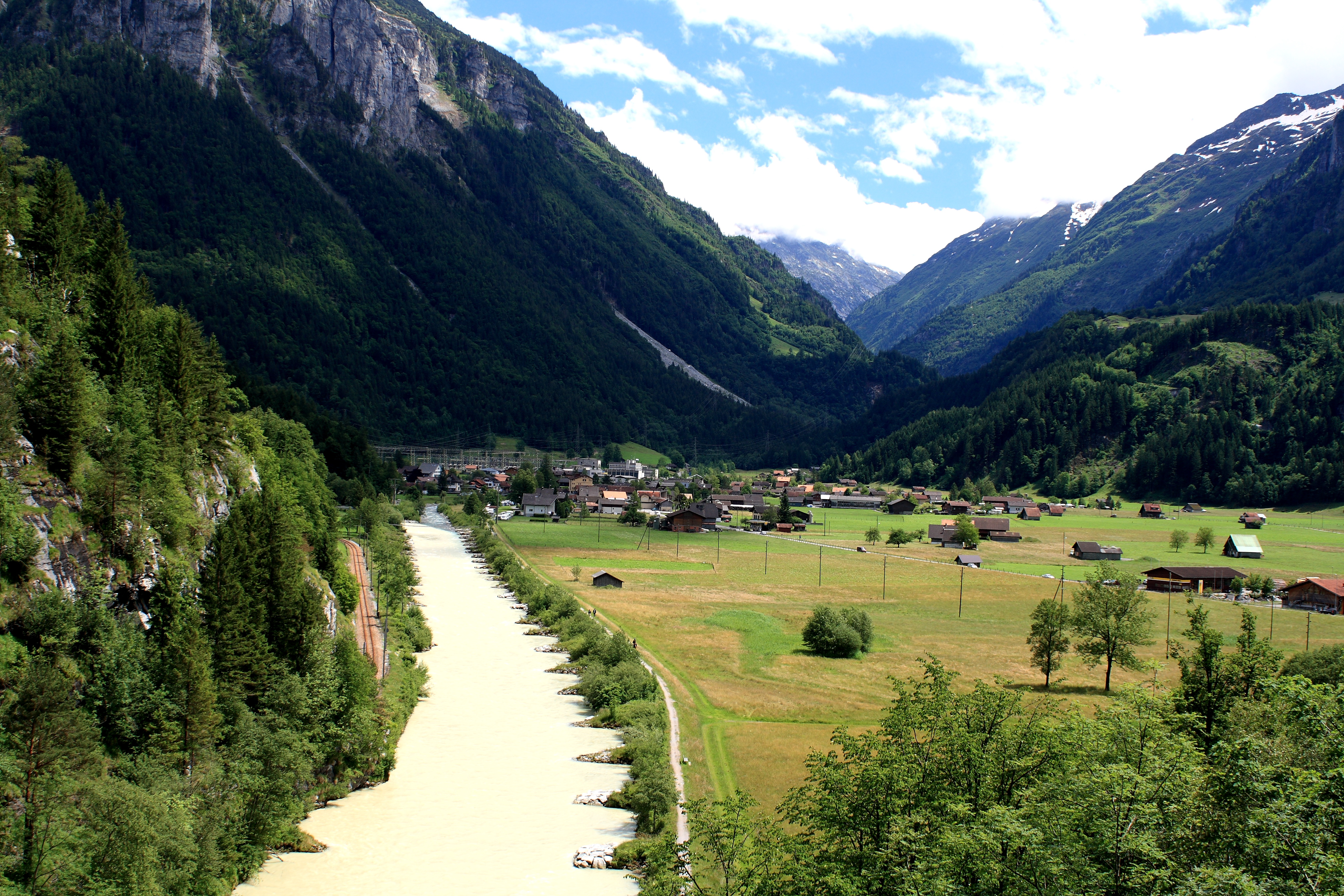
The Aare at Innertkirchen

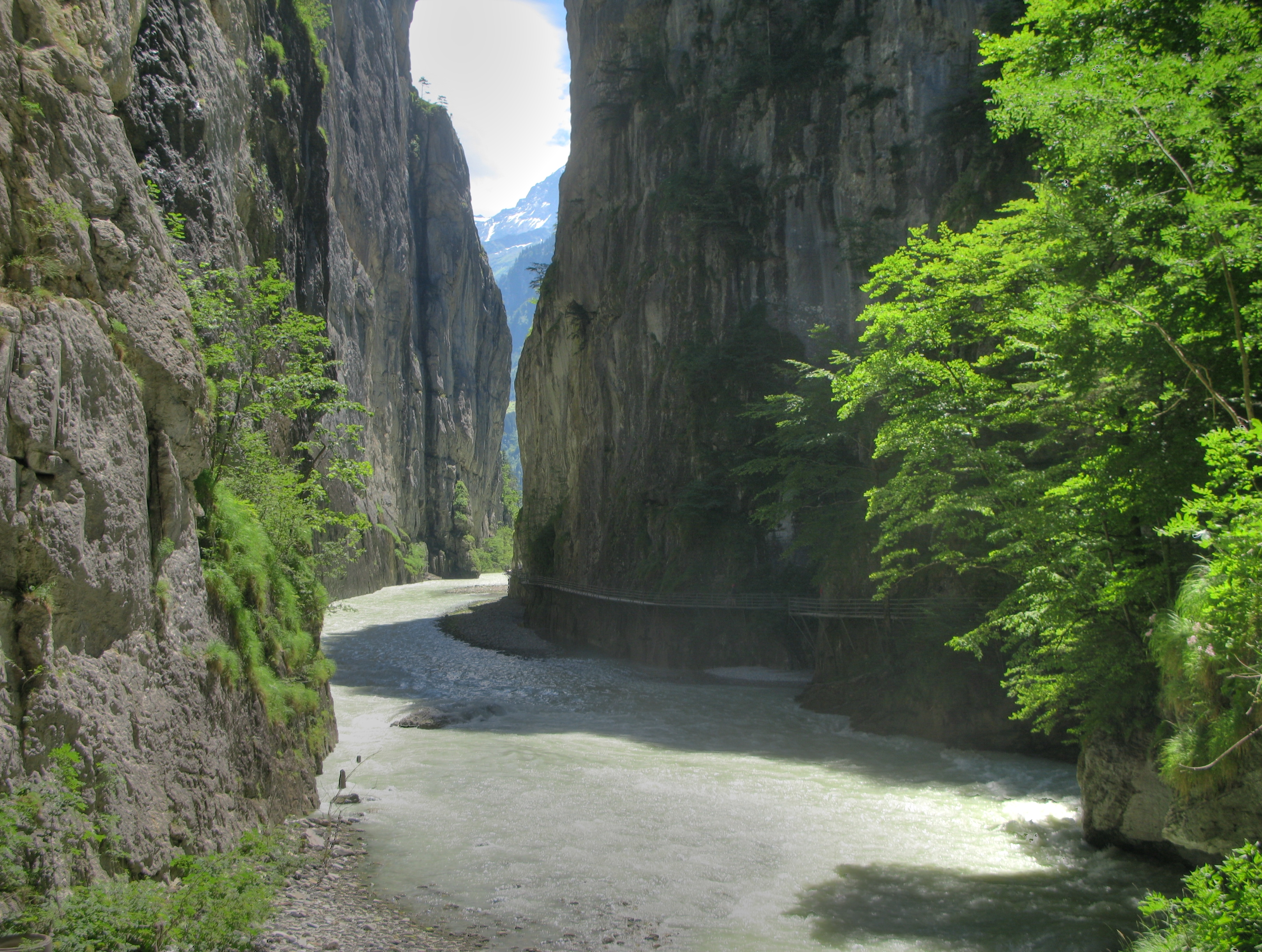
Inside the Aare Gorge

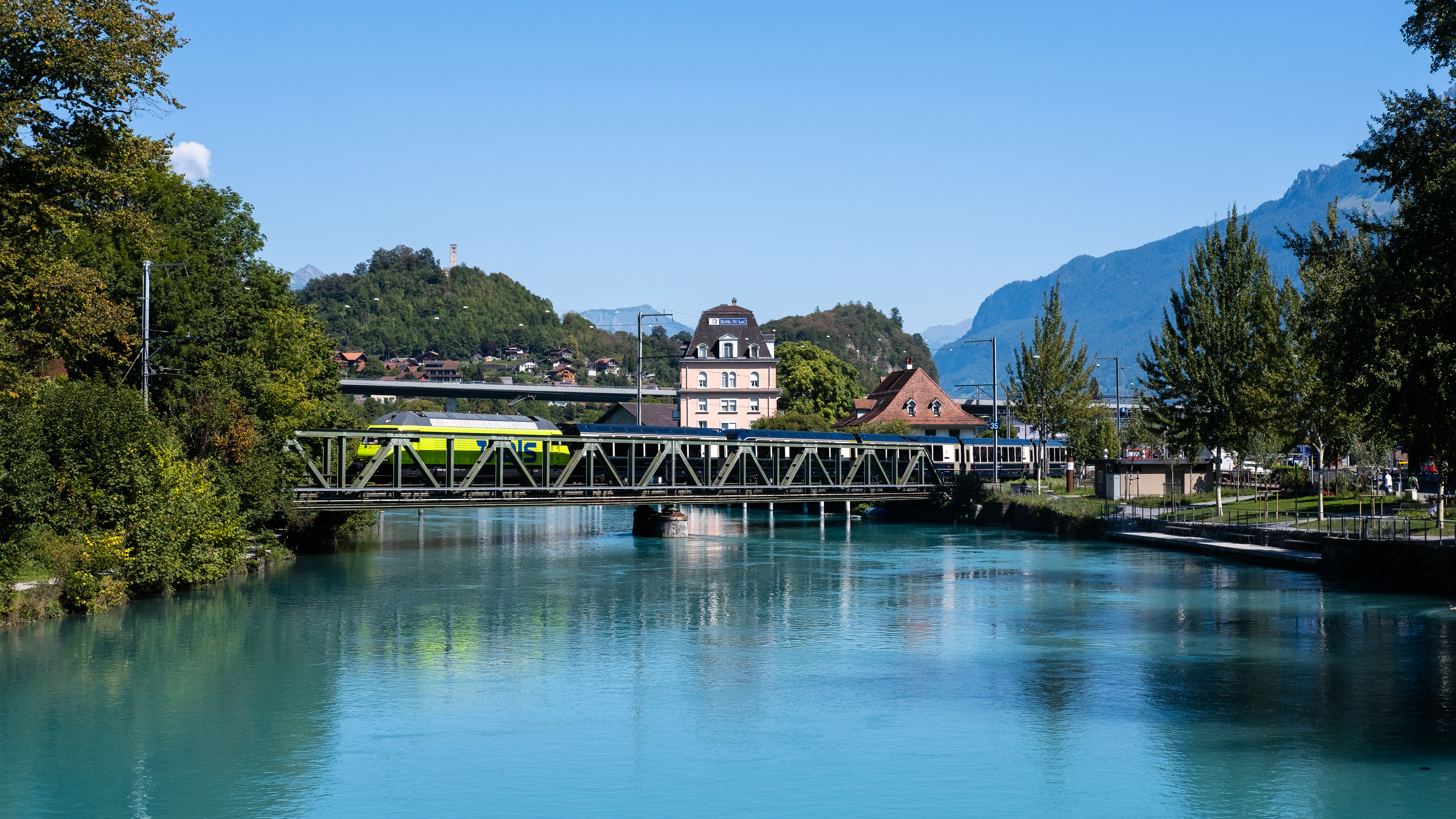
The Aare in Interlaken

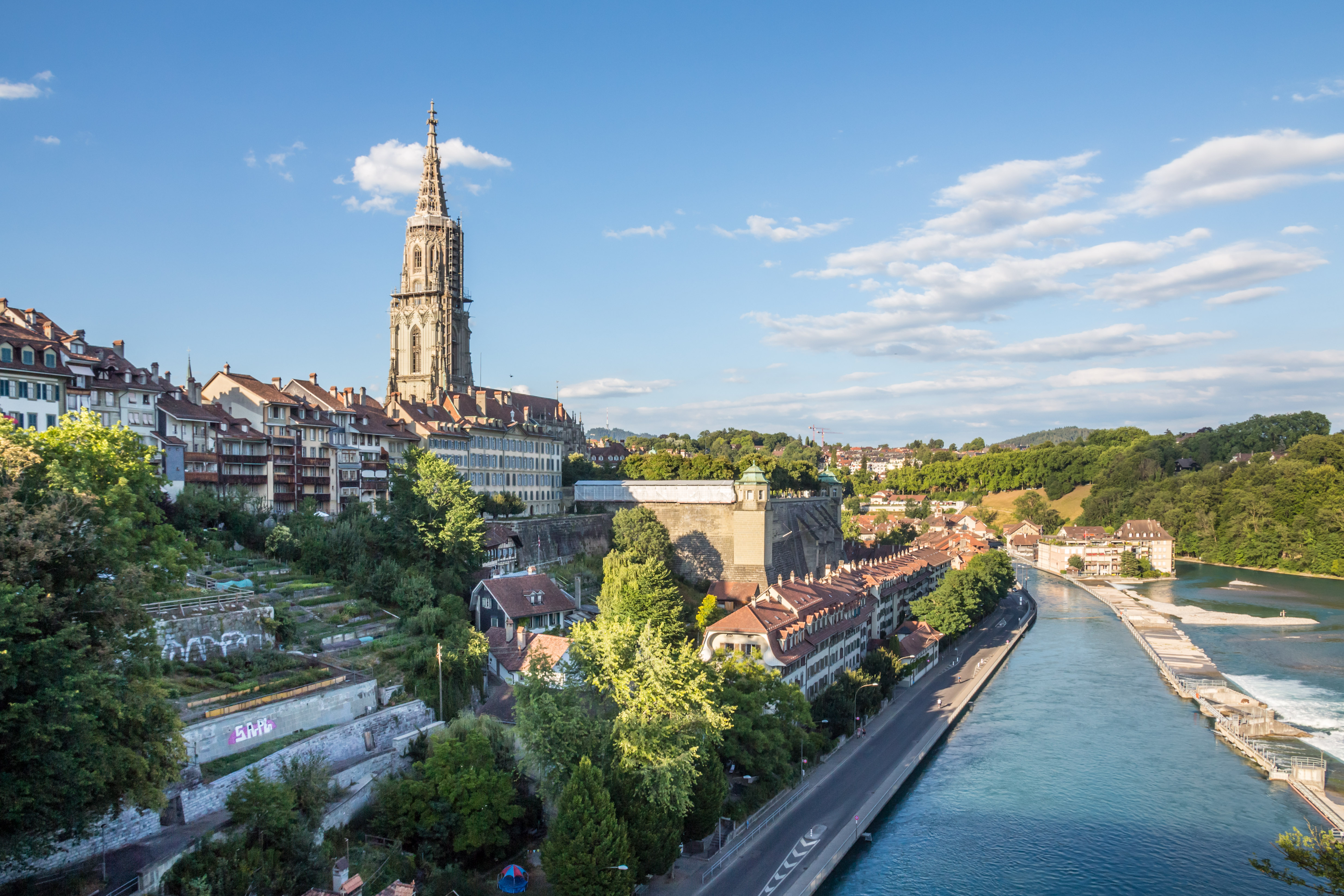
Aare in Bern

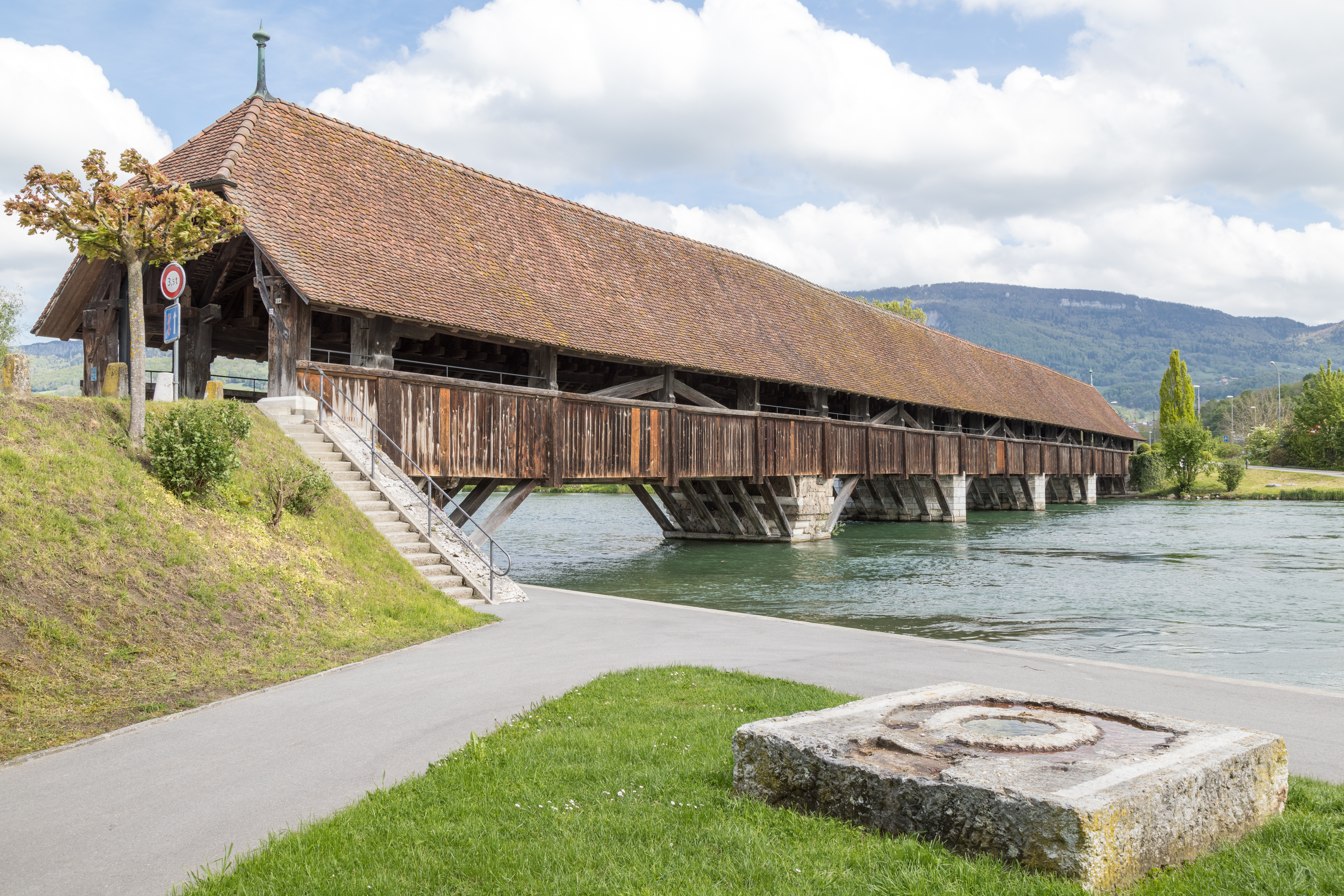
Old bridge at Wangen an der Aare

== Tributaries ==
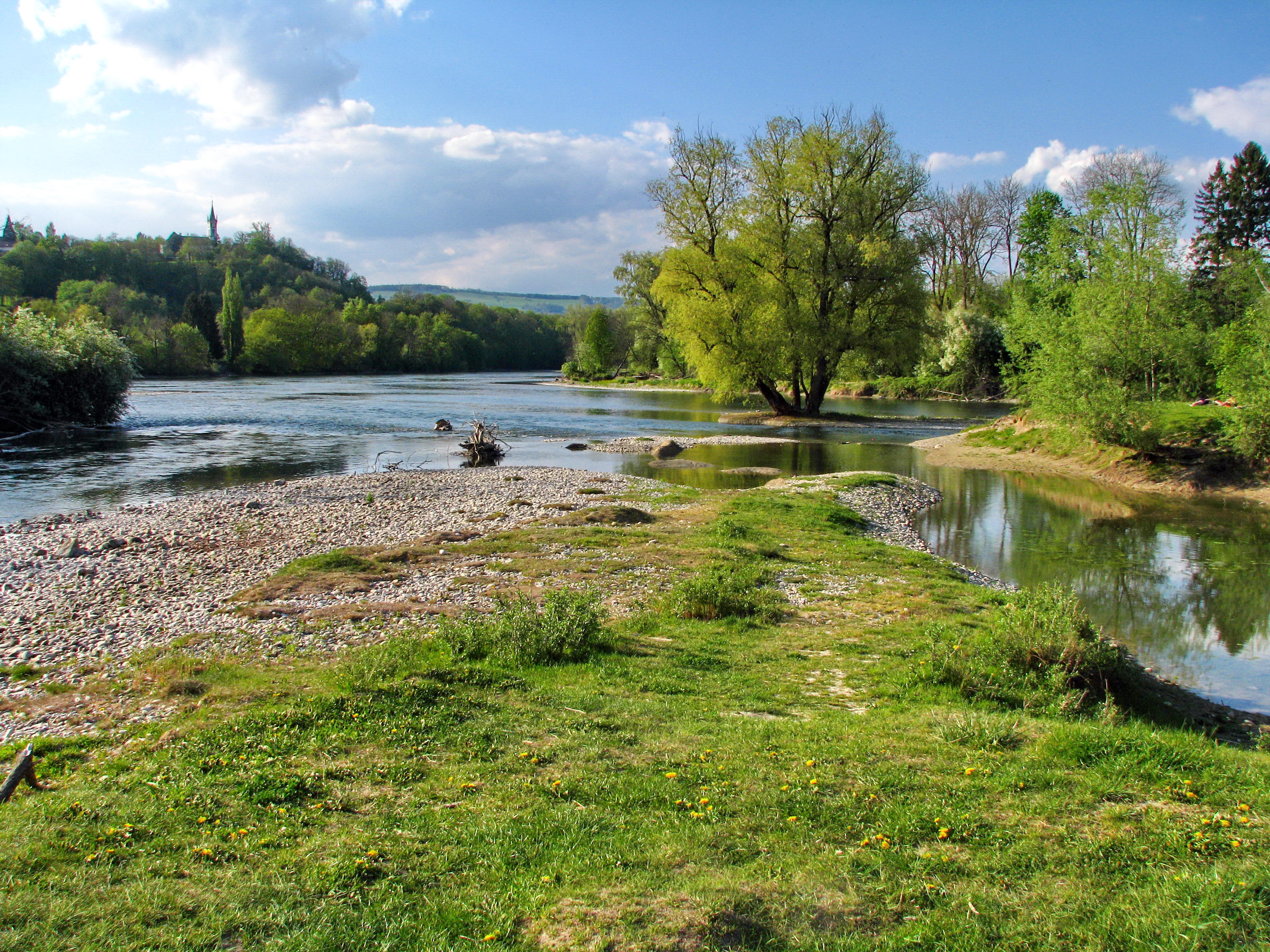
At the "Wasserschloss", where the rivers Aare, Reuss and Limmat flow together

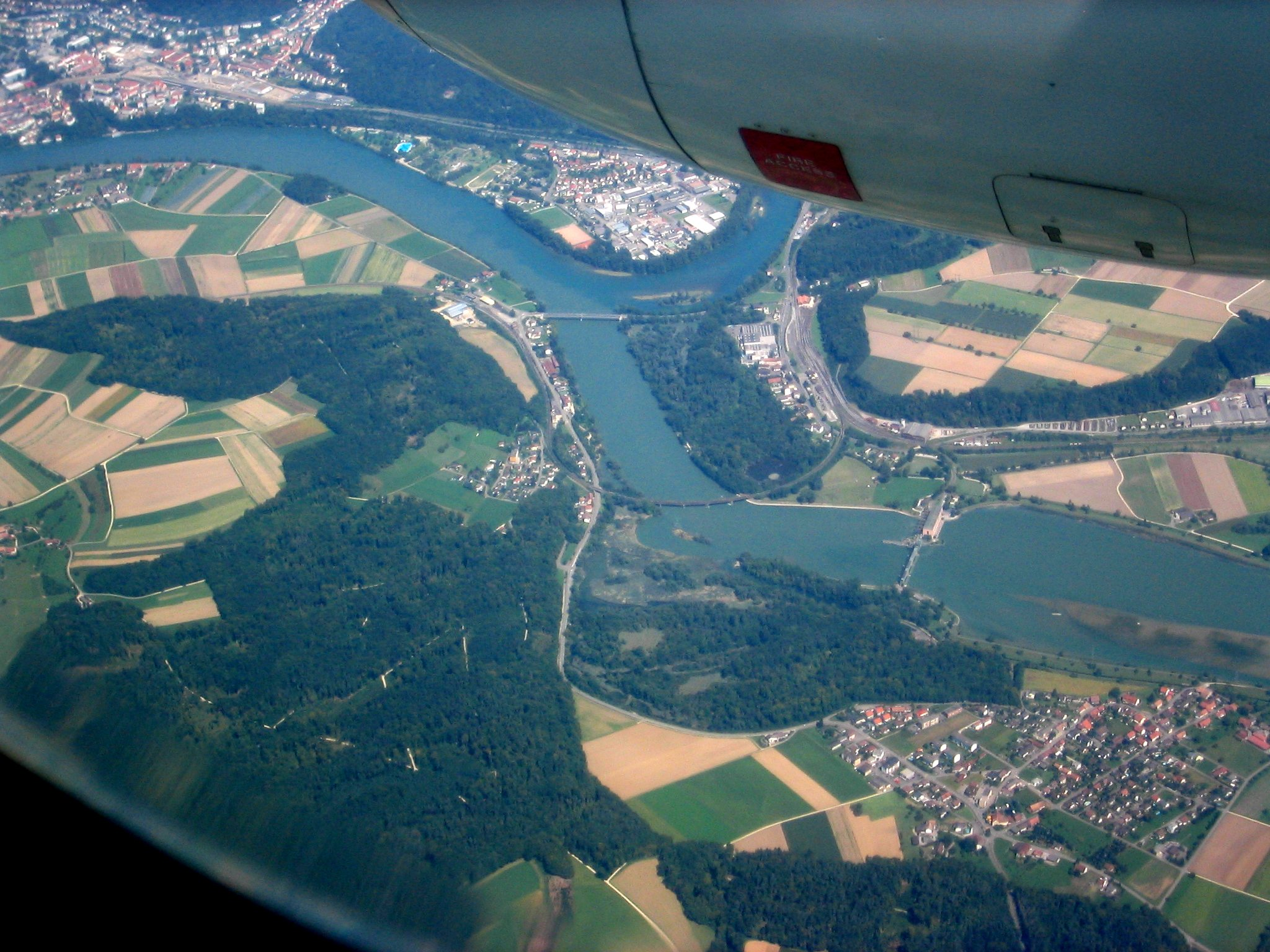
The convergence of the Aare and the Rhine at Koblenz

- Limmat (after and northeast of Brugg, and northwest of Baden)
  - Reppisch
  - Sihl
    - Alp
    - Minster
  - Lake Zurich
    - Jona
    - Wägitaler Aa
    - Linthkanal
      - Lake Walen
        - Linth
          - Löntsch
          - Sernf
          - Flätschbach
        - Seez
        - Seerenbach
- Reuss (after and northeast of Brugg, and northwest of Baden)
  - Lorze
  - Kleine Emme
  - Lake Lucerne
    - Sarner Aa
    - Engelberger Aa
    - Muota
  - Schächen
  - Chärstelenbach
  - Göschener Reuss
- Aabach (coming from Seetal, in Wildegg)
  - Bünz
- Suhre (after and north of Aarau)
  - Wyna
- Aabach (from the left in Aarau)
- Stegbach
- Dünnern (in Olten)
- Wigger (right before Aarburg)
- Murg (before, west of Murgenthal)
  - Rot (Roggwil)
  - Langete (Langenthal)
    - Ursenbach (Kleindietwil)
    - Rotbach (Huttwil)
- (Grosse) Emme (after, east of Solothurn)
- Lake of Bienne
  - La Suze (in Biel/Bienne, right next to the outflow)
  - Zihlkanal
    - Lake of Neuchatel
      - La Broye (flows through Lake Morat)
      - Zihl/La Thielle
        - L'Orbe
        - Le Talent
- Saane/La Sarine (after, west of Wohlensee)
  - Sense
- Gürbe (in Muri bei Bern)
- Zulg (west of Steffisburg)
- Lake Thun
  - Kander (west of Spiez)
    - Simme
    - Entschlige
- Lake Brienz
  - Lütschine (at the end of Lake Brienz, right next to the outflow)
- Gadmerwasser (right after, northwest of Innertkirchen)

== Reservoirs ==
- Lake Grimsel, 1,908 m (6,260 ft)
- Lake Brienz, 564 m (1,850 ft)
- Lake Thun, 558 m (1,831 ft)
- Lake Wohlen, 481 m (1,578 ft)
- Niederriedsee, 461 m (1,512 ft)
- Lake Biel, 429 m (1,407 ft)
- Klingnauer Stausee, 318 m (1,043 ft)

== Incidents ==
On 26 May 2022, Indonesia West Java Governor Ridwan Kamil's eldest child, Emmeril Kahn Mumtadz, was declared missing after being swept away by the river current. Eril, aged 22, was swimming in the river with his sister and friends. The search efforts involving the police search and rescue team, maritime police, fire department, and authority of the city of Bern. One week after he was declared missing, Emmeril Kahn Mumtadz was declared dead in absentia. On 9 June 2022, Eril's body was located. The funeral procession of Emmeril “Eril” Kahn Mumtadz took place in the family's burial ground located in Cimaung, Bandung regency, West Java. Soon after news about Eril's body brought back to his home, Indonesian netizens review bombed Aare River's Google listing, leaving negative comments and one-star ratings as if the waterway was fully to blame for the tragedy.

== See also ==
- Rivers of Switzerland
