= Bonstetten-Wettswil railway station =

Railway station in Switzerland

Bonstetten-Wettswil
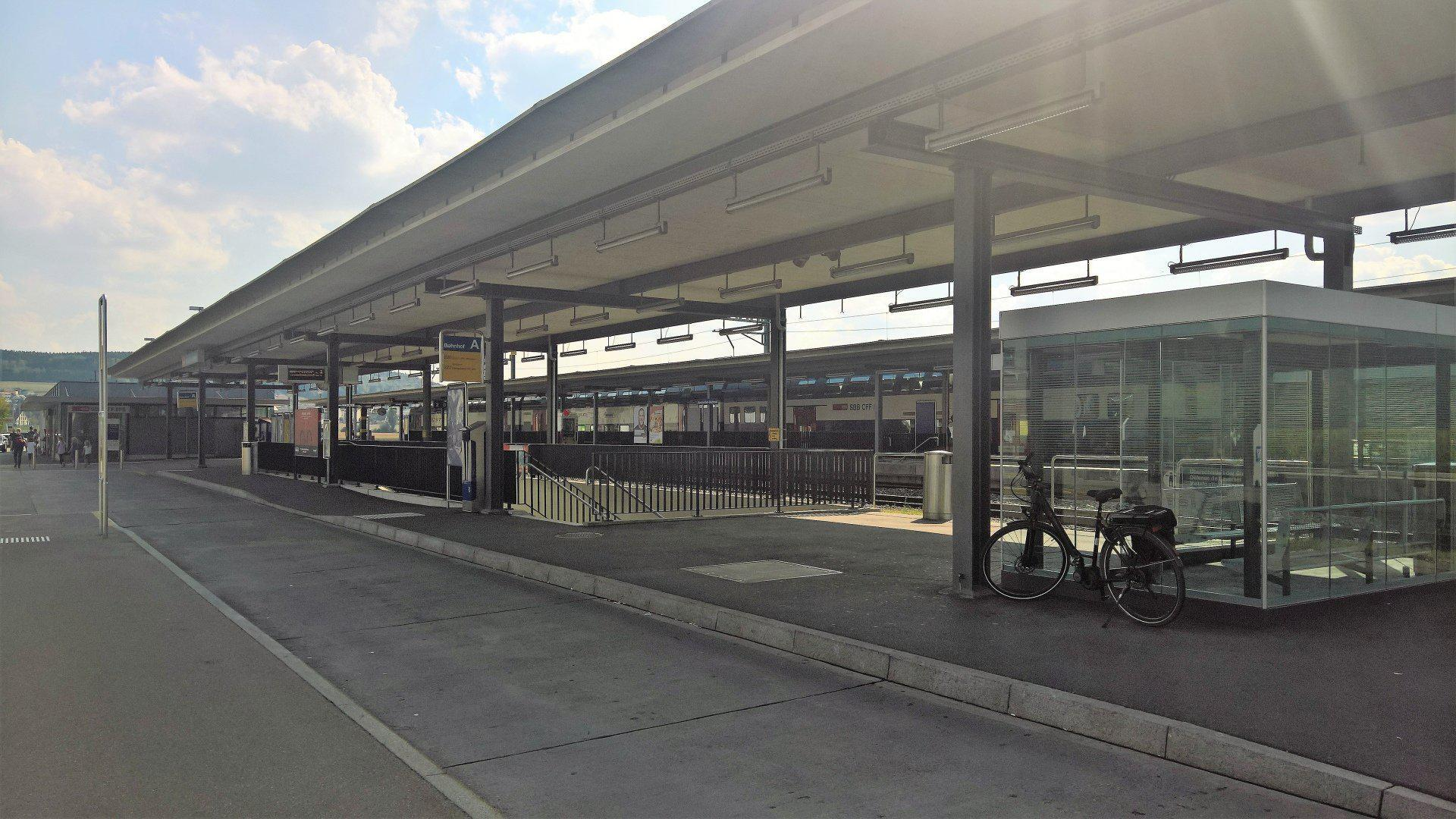
- Bonstetten-Wettswil railway station

General information
- Location: Stationstrasse; Bonstetten, Zurich; Switzerland
- Coordinates: 47.325894°N 8.467755°E
- Elevation: 527 m (1,729 ft)
- Owner: Swiss Federal Railways
- Operator: Swiss Federal Railways
- Line: Zurich–Affoltern am Albis–Zug
- Platforms: 2 side platforms
- Tracks: 2
- Connections: ZVV
- Bus: PostAuto lines 205 221

Other information
- Fare zone: 155 (ZVV)

History
- Opened: 1864

Services
Preceding station	Zurich S-Bahn	Following station
Hedingen towards Zug	S5	Birmensdorf towards Pfäffikon SZ
Hedingen towards Affoltern am Albis	S14	Birmensdorf towards Hinwil
Hedingen towards Knonau	SN5 Limited service	Birmensdorf towards Pfäffikon SZ
Location
- Location within Switzerland Location within Canton of Zurich

Bonstetten-Wettswil is a railway station in the Swiss canton of Zurich. The station is situated on the boundary of the municipalities of Bonstetten and Wettswil am Albis and takes its name from both municipalities. The station is located on the Zurich to Zug via Affoltern am Albis railway line, within fare zone 155 of the Zürcher Verkehrsverbund (ZVV).

== Service ==
The station is served by Zurich S-Bahn lines S5 and S14. During weekends (Friday and Saturday nights), there is also a nighttime S-Bahn service (SN5) offered by ZVV. Summary of S-Bahn services:

- Zurich S-Bahn:
  - S5: half-hourly service to Zug, and to Pfäffikon SZ via Zürich HB.
  - S14: half-hourly service between Affoltern am Albis and Hinwil via Zürich HB.
  - Nighttime S-Bahn (only during weekends):
    - SN5: hourly service between Knonau and Pfäffikon SZ via Zürich HB and Uster.

== See also ==
- Rail transport in Switzerland
