= Hedingen railway station =

Railway station in Switzerland

Hedingen
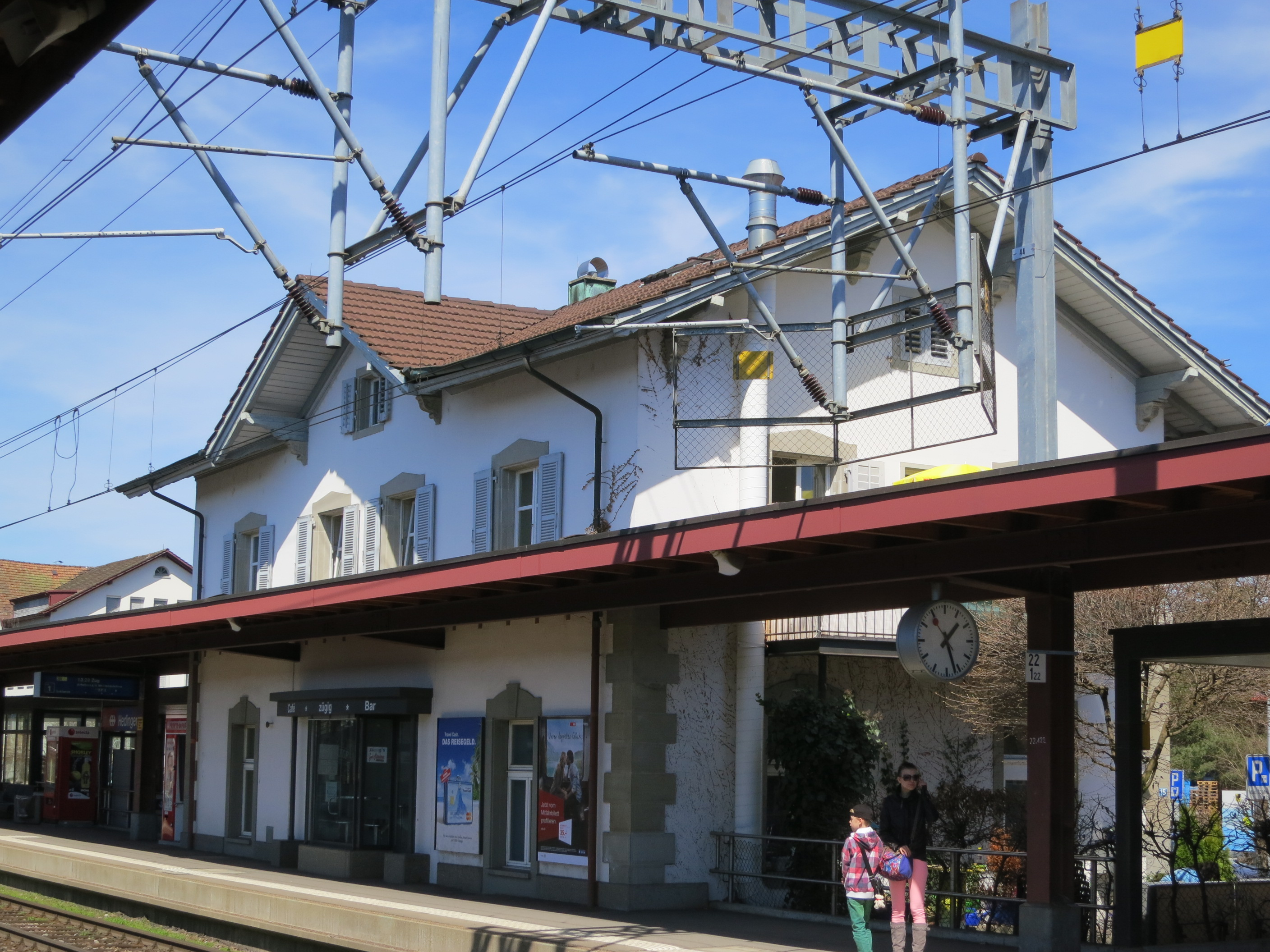

General information
- Location: Bahnhofplatz, Hedingen, Canton of Zurich, Switzerland
- Coordinates: 47.298507°N 8.445793°E
- Elevation: 497 m (1,631 ft)
- Owner: Swiss Federal Railways
- Operator: Swiss Federal Railways
- Line: Zurich–Affoltern am Albis–Zug
- Platforms: 2 side platforms
- Tracks: 2

Other information
- Fare zone: 155 (ZVV)

History
- Opened: 1864

Services
Preceding station	Zurich S-Bahn	Following station
Affoltern am Albis towards Zug	S5	Bonstetten-Wettswil towards Pfäffikon SZ
Affoltern am Albis Terminus	S14	Bonstetten-Wettswil towards Hinwil
Affoltern am Albis towards Knonau	SN5 Limited service	Bonstetten-Wettswil towards Pfäffikon SZ
Location
- Location within Switzerland Location within Canton of Zurich

Hedingen is a railway station in the Swiss canton of Zurich, situated in the municipality of Hedingen. The station is located on the Zurich to Zug via Affoltern am Albis railway line, within fare zone 155 of the Zürcher Verkehrsverbund (ZVV).

== Service ==
Hedingen station is an intermediate stop on Zurich S-Bahn services S5 and S14. During weekends (Friday and Saturday nights), there is also a nighttime S-Bahn service (SN5) offered by ZVV. Summary of S-Bahn services:

- Zurich S-Bahn:
  - S5: half-hourly service to Zug, and to Pfäffikon SZ via Zürich HB.
  - S14: half-hourly service between Affoltern am Albis and Hinwil via Zürich HB.
  - Nighttime S-Bahn (only during weekends):
    - SN5: hourly service between Knonau and Pfäffikon SZ via Zürich HB and Uster.

== Facilities ==
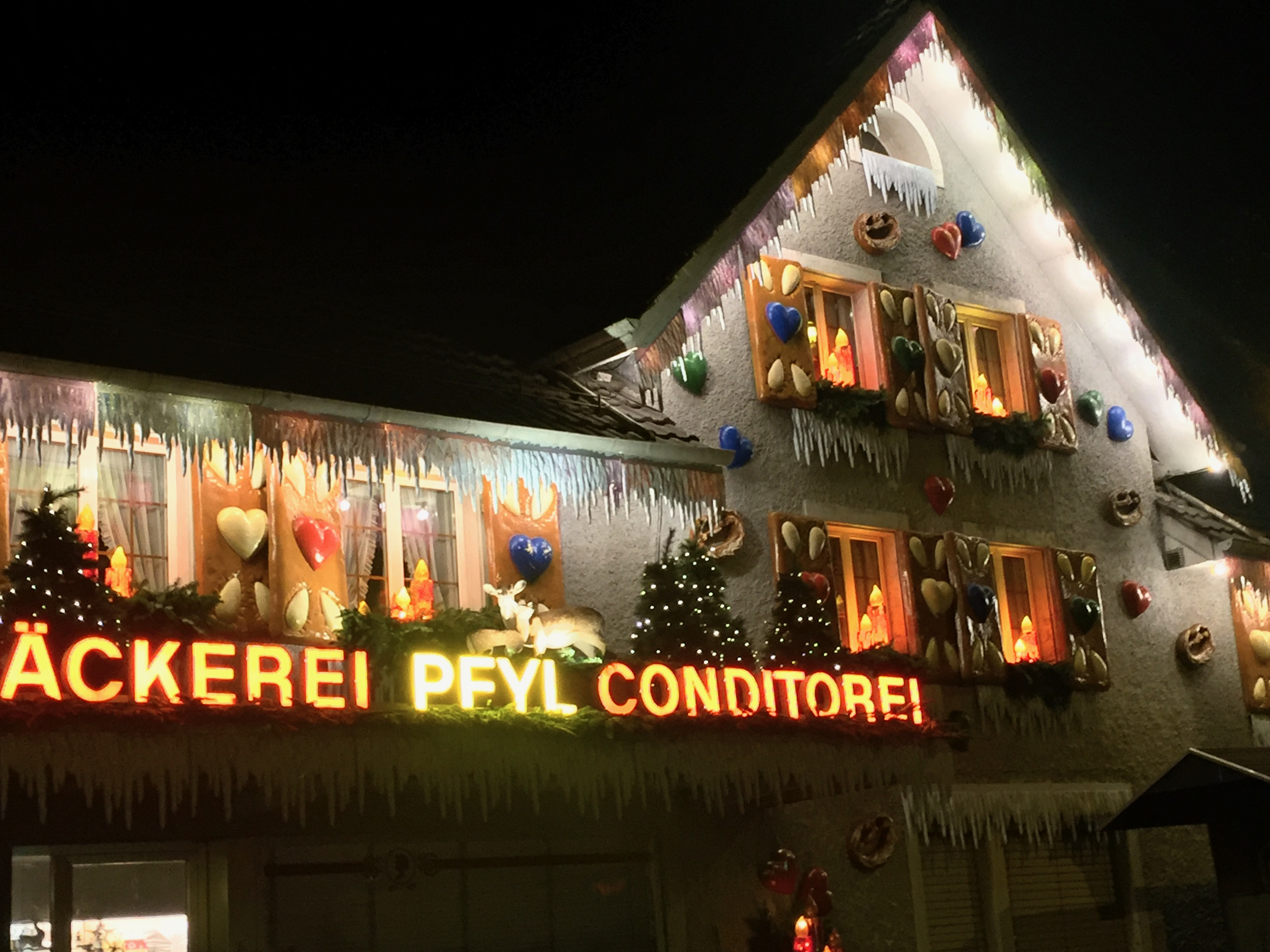
Bäckerei Conditorei Confiserie

This railway station, although not a major station, provides the ability to travellers to purchase tickets for either directions. It has a Kiosk (a convenience store) attached to it where travellers can purchase a variety of products or they can also have a kebab at the nearby shop. It is also located within walking distance from the local supermarket (Volg) and the local bakery (Bäckerei Conditorei Confiserie), which is set up during Christmas time.

== See also ==
- Rail transport in Switzerland
