= Wettswil am Albis =

- Municipality
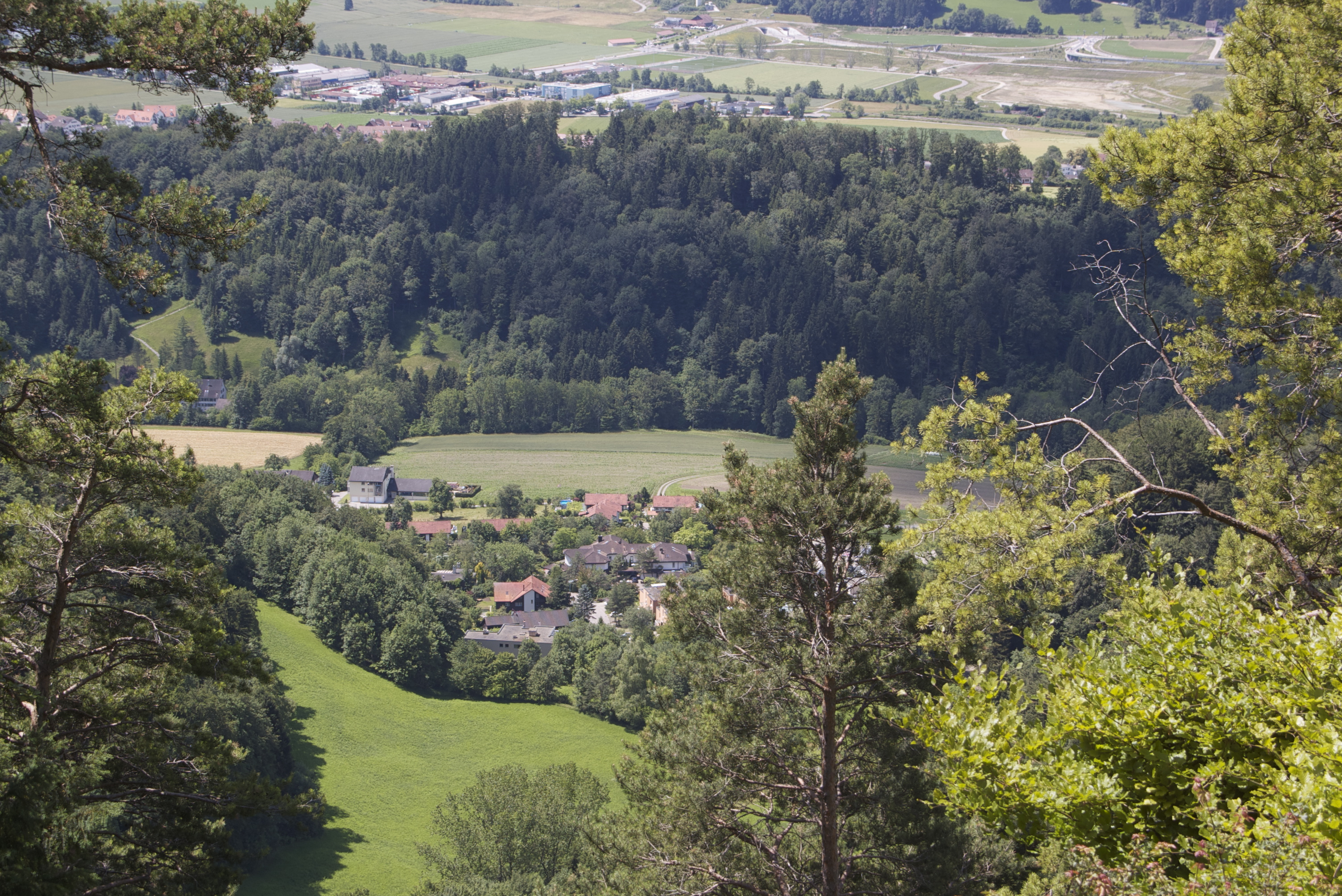

- Flag Coat of arms
- Location of Wettswil am Albis
- Location within Switzerland Location within Canton of Zurich
- Coordinates: 47°20′N 8°28′E
- Country: Switzerland
- Canton: Zurich
- District: Affoltern

Area
  - Total: 3.77 km^{2} (1.46 sq mi)
- Elevation: 563 m (1,847 ft)

Population (December 2020)
  - Total: 5,281
  - Density: 1,400/km^{2} (3,630/sq mi)
- Time zone: UTC+01:00 (CET)
  - Summer (DST): UTC+02:00 (CEST)
- Postal code: 8907
- SFOS number: 14
- ISO 3166 code: CH-ZH
- Surrounded by: Aesch bei Birmensdorf, Birmensdorf, Bonstetten, Stallikon
- Website: www.wettswil.ch

Wettswil am Albis is a municipality in the district of Affoltern in the canton of Zürich in Switzerland.

== Geography ==
Aerial view (1953)

Wettswil am Albis (sometimes written Wettswill a.A.) has an area of 3.8 km^{2} (1.5 sq mi). Of this area, 42.3% is used for agricultural purposes, while 23.7% is forested. Of the rest of the land, 30.9% is settled (buildings or roads) and the remainder (3.2%) is non-productive (rivers, glaciers or mountains). The term am Albis in the name refers to the chain of hills in the area.

== History ==
The earliest written mentions of Wettswil am Albis date back to 1184 where it is referred to as Wettesweilare. The village is believed to have been settled during the period of Alemannic immigration into Switzerland (somewhere between 500 and 700 CE). A chieftain, likely named 'Wetto' or 'Wettin' who might have settled in the region with his clan, might have given the village its name.

== Demographics ==
Wettswil am Albis has a population (as of 31 December 2020) of 5,281. As of 2007, 11.3% of the population was made up of foreign nationals. Over the last 10 years the population has grown at a rate of 21.4%. Most of the population (as of 2000) speaks German (91.7%), with French being second most common ( 1.4%) and Italian being third ( 1.3%).

In the 2007 election the most popular party was the SVP which received 35.1% of the votes. The next three most popular parties were the FDP (19%), the SPS (15.4%) and the CSP (10.7%).

The age distribution of the population (as of 2000) is children and teenagers (0–19 years old) make up 21.5% of the population, while adults (20–64 years old) make up 65.5% and seniors (over 64 years old) make up 13%. In Wettswil am Albis about 88.6% of the population (between age 25-64) have completed either non-mandatory upper secondary education or additional higher education (either university or a Fachhochschule).

Wettswil am Albis has an unemployment rate of 1.44%. As of 2005, there were 61 people employed in the primary economic sector and about 10 businesses involved in this sector. 357 people are employed in the secondary sector and there are 29 businesses in this sector. 454 people are employed in the tertiary sector, with 115 businesses in this sector.

== Transport ==
Bonstetten-Wettswil railway station is a stop of the Zürich S-Bahn on the lines S5 and S14. It is a 23-minute ride from Zürich Hauptbahnhof.

== Notable people ==
- Ines Torelli (born 1931), a Swiss comedian, radio personality, and stage, voice and film actress
- Chiara Bättig (born 2010), a Swiss racing driver
