= Affoltern am Albis railway station =

Railway station in Zürich, Switzerland

Affoltern am Albis
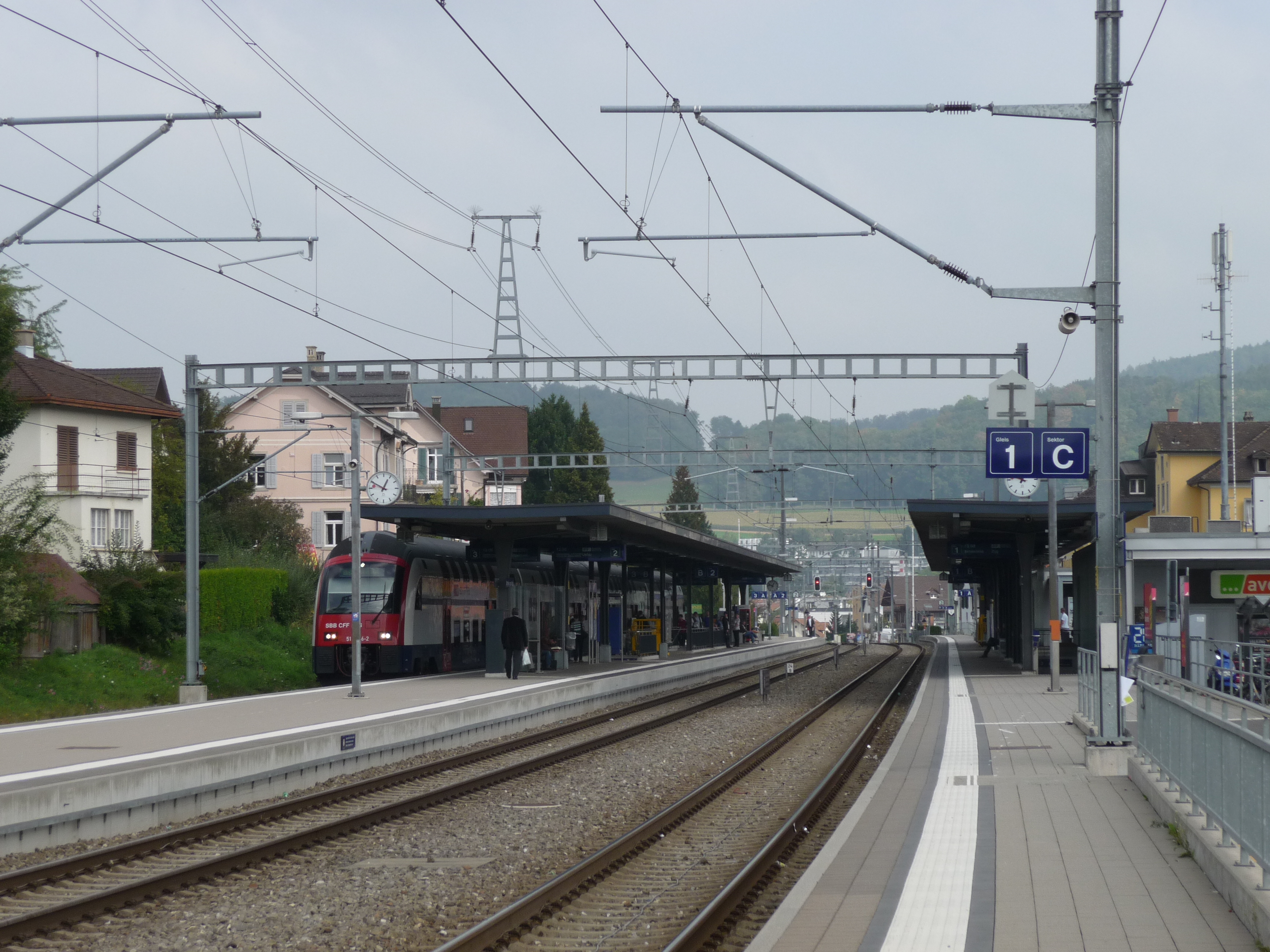

General information
- Location: Bahnhofplatz, Affoltern am Albis, Canton of Zürich, Switzerland
- Coordinates: 47.275881°N 8.44604°E
- Elevation: 494 m (1,621 ft)
- Owner: Swiss Federal Railways
- Operator: Swiss Federal Railways
- Line: Zurich–Affoltern am Albis–Zug
- Platforms: 1 island platform, 1 side platform
- Tracks: 3
- Connections: ZVV
- Bus: PostAuto lines 200 212 214 215 223 225

Other information
- Fare zone: 156 (ZVV)

History
- Opened: 1864

Services
| Preceding station | Zurich S-Bahn | Following station |
|---|---|---|
| Mettmenstetten towards Zug | S5 | Hedingen towards Pfäffikon SZ |
| Terminus | S14 | Hedingen towards Hinwil |
| Mettmenstetten towards Knonau | SN5 Limited service | Hedingen towards Pfäffikon SZ |
Location
- Location within Switzerland Location within Canton of Zurich

Affoltern am Albis is a railway station in the Swiss canton of Zurich, situated in the municipality of Affoltern am Albis. The station is located on the Zürich to Zug via Affoltern am Albis railway line, within fare zone 156 of the Zürcher Verkehrsverbund (ZVV). Affoltern am Albis station is less than 30 minutes from Zurich Main Station (Zürich HB).

== History ==
On the Zug side there are three sidings, which are rarely used, and a former siding from the OVA site. The old station with its two platform tracks was completely rebuilt in 2001. The level crossing at the OVA site was abolished and replaced by a bicycle and passenger underpass. The station received a third platform track and all buildings were replaced. The station forecourt was rebuilt and a bus station was built. The integrated bus terminal has eight stops for the provisional six bus routes to the region as well as to Cham, Zurich, Muri and Thalwil. In September 2002, the current station was inaugurated with a festival.

== Service ==
Affoltern am Albis station is an intermediate stop on Zürich S-Bahn line S5, as well as being the terminus of line S14. During weekends (Friday and Saturday nights), there is also a nighttime S-Bahn service (SN5) offered by ZVV. Summary of S-Bahn services:

- Zurich S-Bahn:
  - S5: half-hourly service to Zug, and to Pfäffikon SZ via Zürich HB.
  - S14: half-hourly service to Hinwil via Zürich HB.
  - Nighttime S-Bahn (only during weekends):
    - SN5: hourly service between Knonau and Pfäffikon SZ via Zürich HB and Uster.

== Gallery ==
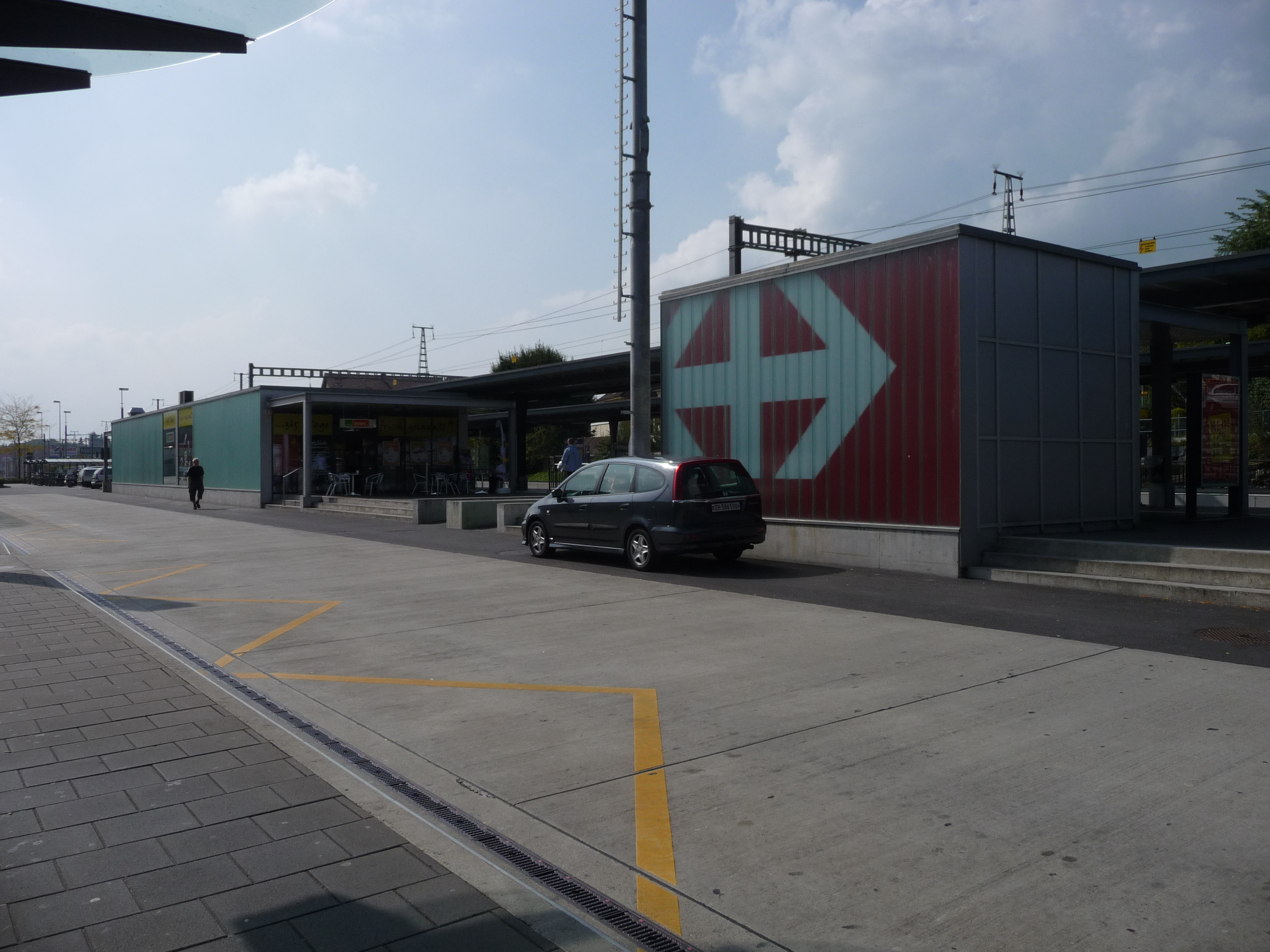
Station frontage

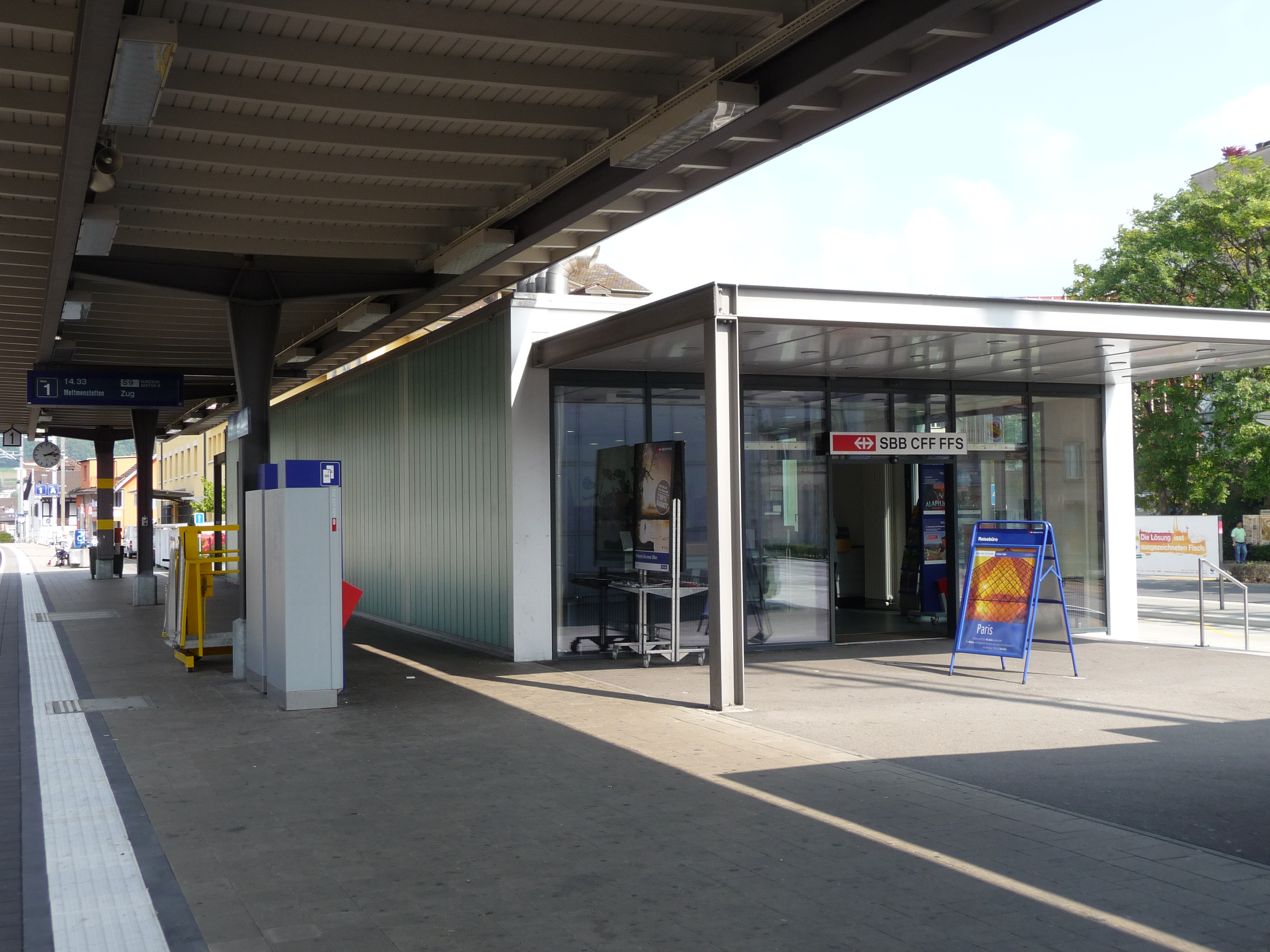
Station building

== See also ==
- Rail transport in Switzerland
