= Mettmenstetten railway station =

Railway station in Zurich, Switzerland

Mettmenstetten
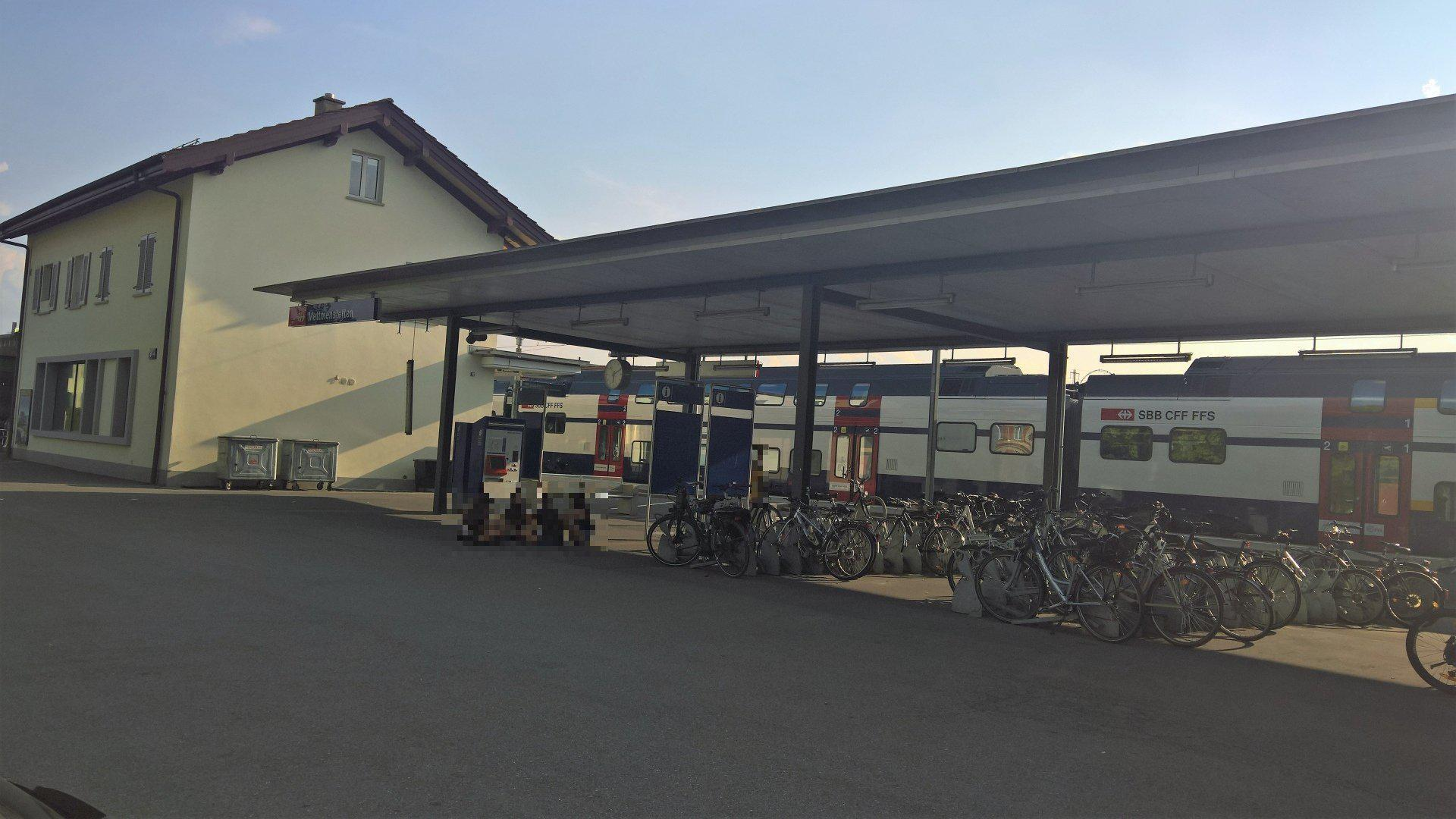
- Mettmenstetten railway station

General information
- Location: Untere Bahnhofstrasse; Mettmenstetten, Zurich; Switzerland
- Coordinates: 47.244163°N 8.457595°E
- Elevation: 461 m (1,512 ft)
- Owner: Swiss Federal Railways
- Operator: Swiss Federal Railways
- Line: Zurich–Affoltern am Albis–Zug
- Platforms: 1 side platform
- Tracks: 1
- Connections: ZVV
- Bus: PostAuto lines 230 232

Other information
- Fare zone: 156 (ZVV)

History
- Opened: 1864

Services
Preceding station	Zurich S-Bahn	Following station
Knonau towards Zug	S5	Affoltern am Albis towards Pfäffikon SZ
Knonau Terminus	SN5 Limited service	Affoltern am Albis towards Pfäffikon SZ
Location
- Location within Switzerland Location within Canton of Zurich

Mettmenstetten is a railway station in the Swiss canton of Zurich, situated in the municipality of Mettmenstetten. The station is located on the Zurich to Zug via Affoltern am Albis railway line, within fare zone 156 of the Zürcher Verkehrsverbund (ZVV).

== Service ==
The station is an intermediate stop on Zurich S-Bahn line S5, which runs between Zug and Pfäffikon via Zurich and Uster. During weekends (Friday and Saturday nights), there is also a nighttime S-Bahn service (SN5) offered by ZVV. Summary of S-Bahn services:

- Zurich S-Bahn:
  - S5: half-hourly service to Zug, and to Pfäffikon SZ via Zürich HB.
  - Nighttime S-Bahn (only during weekends):
    - SN5: hourly service between Knonau and Pfäffikon SZ via Zürich HB and Uster.

== See also ==
- Rail transport in Switzerland
