= Bonstetten, Switzerland =

Bonstetten
- Municipality
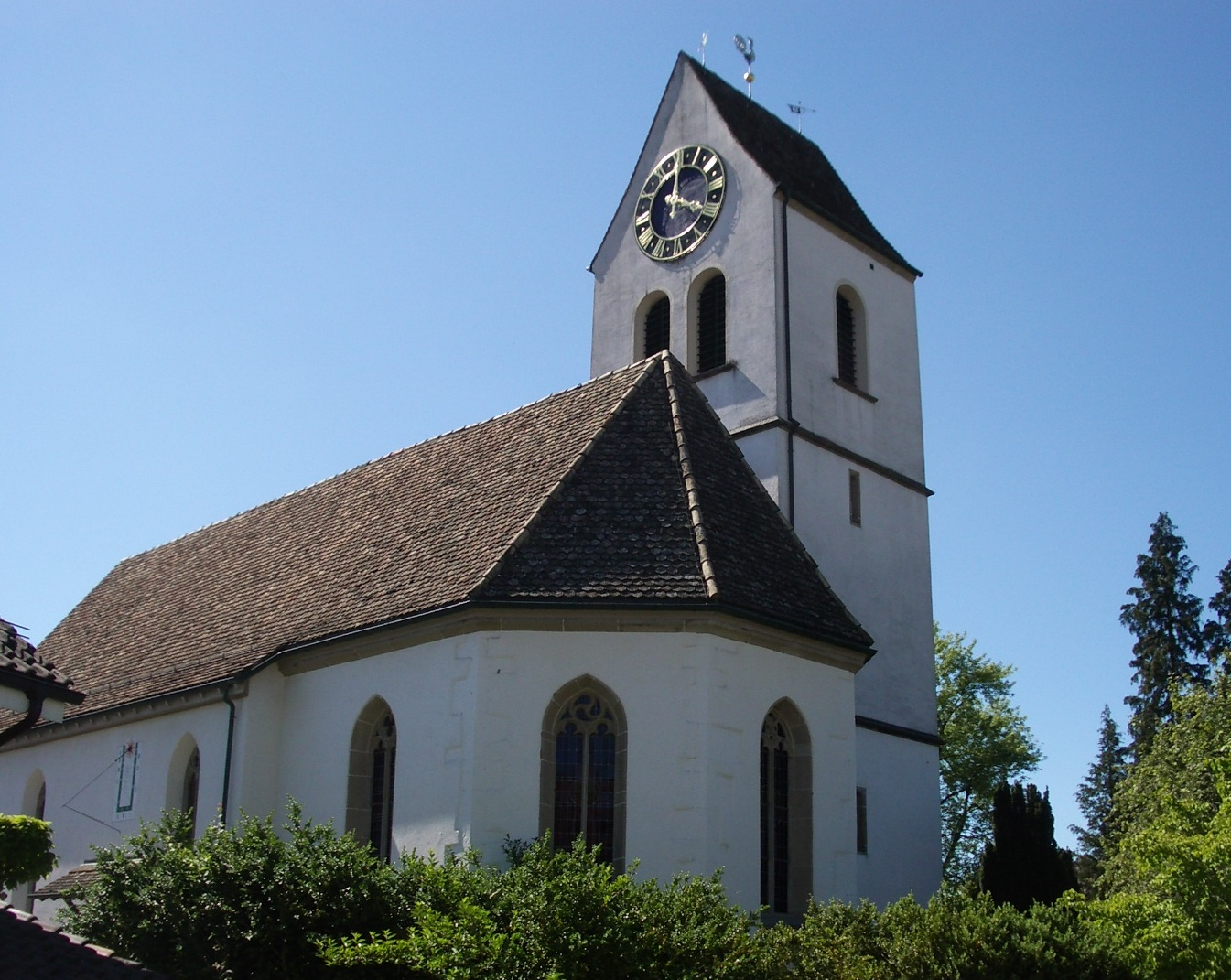

- Flag Coat of arms
- Location of Bonstetten
- Location within Switzerland Location within Canton of Zurich
- Coordinates: 47°19′N 8°28′E
- Country: Switzerland
- Canton: Zurich
- District: Affoltern

Area
  - Total: 7.42 km^{2} (2.86 sq mi)
- Elevation: 543 m (1,781 ft)

Population (December 2020)
  - Total: 5,610
  - Density: 756/km^{2} (1,960/sq mi)
- Time zone: UTC+01:00 (CET)
  - Summer (DST): UTC+02:00 (CEST)
- Postal code: 8906
- SFOS number: 3
- ISO 3166 code: CH-ZH
- Surrounded by: Aesch bei Birmensdorf, Birmensdorf, Hedingen, Islisberg (AG), Stallikon, Wettswil am Albis
- Twin towns: Bonstetten (Germany)
- Website: www.bonstetten.ch

Bonstetten (High Alemannic: Bauschtette) is a village in the district of Affoltern in the canton of Zürich in Switzerland.

== History ==
Aerial view by Walter Mittelholzer (1923)

Bonstetten is first mentioned in 1120 as Buonstetin, though this reference is debated. In 1184 it was mentioned as Bowensteden.

== Geography ==
Bonstetten has an area of 7.4 km^{2} (2.9 sq mi). Of this area, 57.3% is used for agricultural purposes, while 29.2% is forested. Of the rest of the land, 13.3% is settled (buildings or roads) and the remainder (0.1%) is non-productive (rivers, glaciers or mountains).

== Demographics ==
Bonstetten has a population (as of 31 December 2020) of 5,610. As of 2007, 11.5% of the population was made up of foreign nationals. Over the last 10 years the population has grown at a rate of 32.6%. Most of the population (as of 2000) speaks German (90.6%), with English being second most common ( 2.2%) and Italian being third ( 1.9%). In the 2007 election the most popular party was the SVP which received 30.6% of the vote. The next three most popular parties were the SPS (20.4%), the FDP (17.2%) and the CSP (12.4%).

The age distribution of the population (as of 2000) is children and teenagers (0–19 years old) make up 24.5% of the population, while adults (20–64 years old) make up 67.2% and seniors (over 64 years old) make up 8.2%. In Bonstetten about 86.5% of the population (between age 25–64) have completed either non-mandatory upper secondary education or additional higher education (either university or a Fachhochschule).

Bonstetten has an unemployment rate of 1.62%. As of 2005, there were 101 people employed in the primary economic sector and about 25 businesses involved in this sector. 95 people are employed in the secondary sector and there are 26 businesses in this sector. 543 people are employed in the tertiary sector, with 112 businesses in this sector. The historical population is given in the following table:

year	population
1635	495
1712	612
1850	887
1900	691
1920	649
1950	888
1960	1,180
2000	3,893

== Transport ==
Bonstetten-Wettswil railway station is a stop of the Zürich S-Bahn on the lines S5 and S14. It is a 21-minute ride from Zürich Hauptbahnhof.
