= S5 (ZVV) =

Railway service in Switzerland

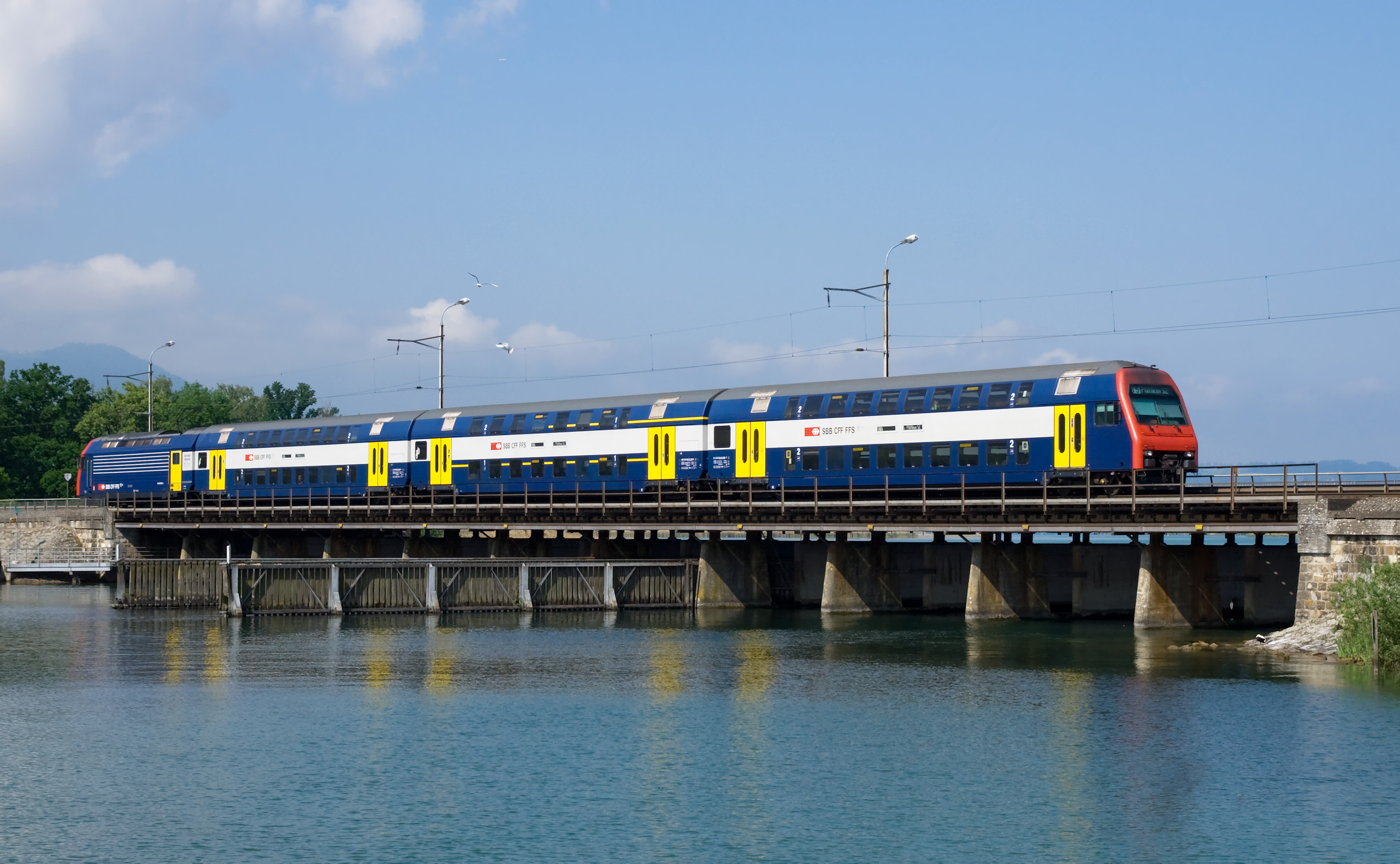
- Re 450 powered S5 train crossing the Seedamm

Overview
- Status: Operational
- Locale: Zürich, Switzerland
- Termini: Zug; Pfäffikon SZ
- Stations: 22
- Website: ZVV (in English)

Service
- Type: S-Bahn
- System: Zürich S-Bahn
- Operator(s): Zürcher Verkehrsverbund (ZVV)
- Rolling stock: RABe 511 class

Technical
- Track gauge: 1,435 mm (4 ft 8 1/2 in)

Zürich S-Bahn network as of December 2018

The S5 is a regional railway service of the S-Bahn Zürich on the Zürcher Verkehrsverbund (ZVV), Zürich transportation network. The S5 is one of the network's services connecting the cantons of Zürich, St. Gallen, Schwyz and Zug.

At Zürich HB, trains of the S5 service usually depart from underground tracks (Gleis) 41–44 (Museumstrasse station).

== Route ==
- S5 Zug–Affoltern am Albis–Zürich HB–Uster–Wetzikon–Rapperswil–Pfäffikon SZ
  Stops between Stadelhofen and Wetzikon only in Uster.

The S5 service links the city of Zug and Pfäffikon SZ, on the south shore of Lake Zürich in the canton of Schwyz. Trains use the Zürich–Affoltern am Albis–Zug line between Zug and Zürich Altstetten. From there, they use the Zürich–Baden line to reach Zürich Hauptbahnhof and then the Zürich–Winterthur line to reach Zürich Stadelhofen. East of Stadelhofen, trains take the Wallisellen–Uster–Rapperswil line, which diverges south, to Rapperswil. Finally, trains cross the Seedamm on the Rapperswil–Pfäffikon line to reach Pfäffikon. The following stations are served:

- Zug
- Steinhausen Rigiblick
- Steinhausen
- Knonau
- Mettmenstetten
- Affoltern am Albis
- Hedingen
- Bonstetten-Wettswil
- Birmensdorf
- Urdorf Weihermatt
- Urdorf
- Zürich Altstetten
- Zürich Hardbrücke
- Zürich Hauptbahnhof
- Zürich Stadelhofen
- Uster
- Wetzikon
- Bubikon
- Rüti ZH
- Jona
- Rapperswil
- Pfäffikon SZ

== Rolling stock ==
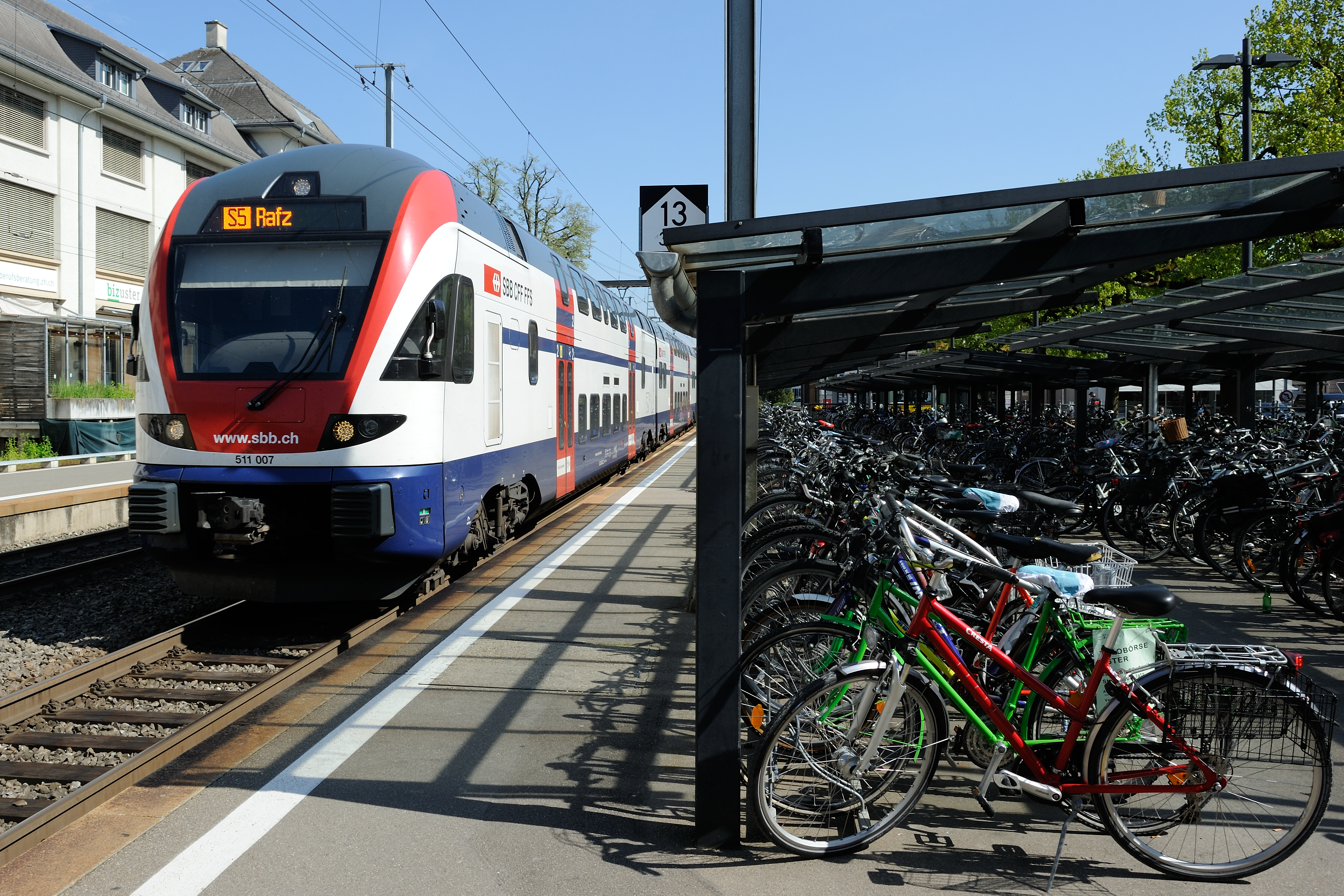
An RABe 511 at Uster in 2014

Before the timetable revision of late 2015 the S5 services were operated by RABe 514 class on the weekdays and RABe 511 class on weekends. As of 2021, all services are operated by RABe 511 EMUs.

== Scheduling ==
The S5 has a normal frequency of one train every 30 minutes. The through journey time is just over one hour 30 minutes. Combined with the S15, the S5 provides quarter-hourly services at stations between Hardbrücke and Rapperswil.

== History ==
Prior to the timetable revision of late 2015, the section of the S5 between Zürich and Pfäffikon operated much as today, except that S5 also served Hurden. However west of Zürich, the trains operated to Oberglatt, where alternating trains continued to either Niederweningen or Rafz. The core of the line ran to a frequency of every half hour, thus providing hourly services to Niederweningen and Rafz. The section between Oberglatt and Niederweningen was also served by an hourly shuttle service numbered S55, that were connected at Oberglatt with the S5 trains which ran to and from Rafz.

The sections of line no longer covered by the S5 and S55 are now served by the S9 (to Rafz) and S15 (to Niederweningen).

== See also ==
- Rail transport in Switzerland
- List of railway stations in Zurich
- Public transport in Zurich
- ZVV fare zones
