= Knonau railway station =

Railway station in Switzerland

Knonau
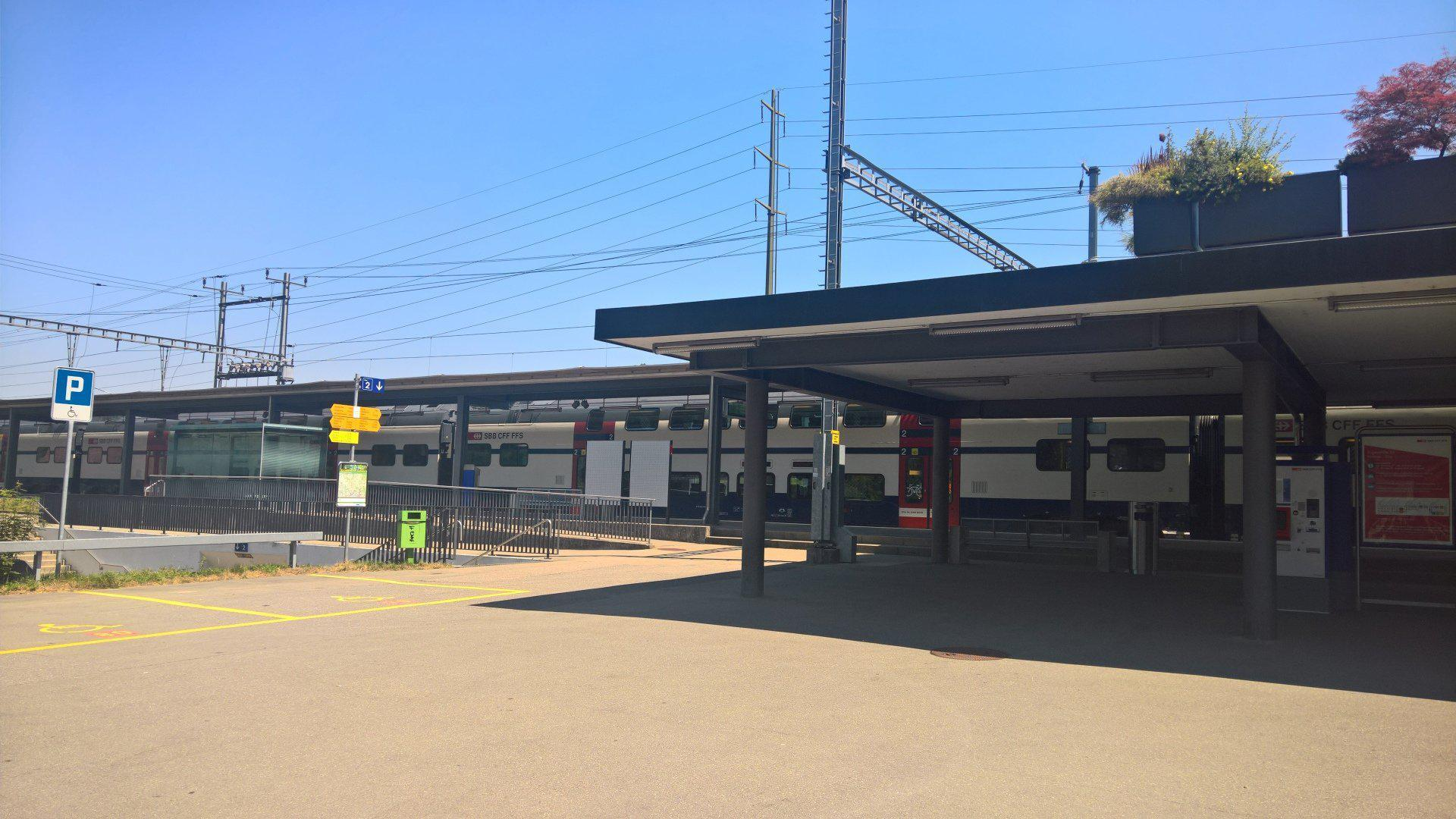
- Knonau railway station

General information
- Location: Bahnhofweg; Knonau, Zurich; Switzerland
- Coordinates: 47.220413°N 8.4668°E
- Elevation: 436 m (1,430 ft)
- Owner: Swiss Federal Railways
- Operator: Swiss Federal Railways
- Line: Zurich–Affoltern am Albis–Zug
- Platforms: 2 side platforms
- Tracks: 2
- Connections: ZVV
- Bus: Zugerland Verkehrsbetriebe bus line 648

Other information
- Fare zone: 156 (ZVV); 633 (Zug Fare Network)

History
- Opened: 1864

Services
| Preceding station | Zurich S-Bahn | Following station |
|---|---|---|
| Steinhausen towards Zug | S5 | Mettmenstetten towards Pfäffikon SZ |
| Terminus | SN5 Limited service | Mettmenstetten towards Pfäffikon SZ |
Location
- Location within Switzerland Location within Canton of Zurich

Knonau is a railway station in the Swiss canton of Zurich, situated in the municipality of Knonau. The station is located on the Zurich to Zug via Affoltern am Albis railway line, within both fare zone 156 of the Zürcher Verkehrsverbund (ZVV) and fare zone 633 of the Zug Fare Network.

== Service ==
Knonau is an intermediate stop on Zurich S-Bahn line S5, which runs between Zug and Pfäffikon via Zurich and Uster. During weekends (Friday and Saturday nights), there is also a nighttime S-Bahn service (SN5) offered by ZVV. Summary of S-Bahn services:

- Zurich S-Bahn:
  - S5: half-hourly service to Zug, and to Pfäffikon SZ via Zürich HB.
  - Nighttime S-Bahn (only during weekends):
    - SN5: hourly service to Pfäffikon SZ via Zürich HB and Uster.

== See also ==
- Rail transport in Switzerland
