= Zürcher Verkehrsverbund =

Public transport network in Switzerland

Zürcher Verkehrsverbund (ZVV)

Overview
- Locale: Canton of Zurich, Switzerland
- Transit type: Rail; Light Rail; Bus; Trolleybus; Lake passenger liner; Funicular; Aerial tram
- Annual ridership: 687,000,000 (2025)
- Chief executive: Dominik Brühwiler (director)
- Website: zvv.ch

Operation
- Began operation: May 1990 (36 years ago)

The Zürcher Verkehrsverbund (ZVV), lit. 'Zurich Transport Network' is the largest public transportation network in Switzerland. It covers the canton of Zurich and adjacent areas. All modes of public transportation (rail, light rail, bus, trolleybus, lake passenger liner, funicular, and aerial tram) within a chosen number of fare zones can be used freely with a ticket that is valid for a certain amount of time (e.g., 1 hour, 24 hours) or with monthly/annual subscriptions.

== History ==
The system was established in May 1990 as a unified fare system with a coordinated local train network. Local train lines were prefixed with the letter S (S-Bahn) to form the Zurich S-Bahn network. A proof-of-payment fare system is in force on all ZVV vehicles. Fare gates are not used, but those caught without a valid ticket during a random inspection face a minimum fine of SFr 100.

== Zones ==
The ZVV system uses an integrated ticket network. The zones are numbered 110–184; the numbers 180–184 designates zones outside of the canton's border. Passengers purchase a base ticket for particular zones. Upgrades and extension tickets are available as supplements.

== Operators ==
ZVV does not own any vehicles, the latter are provided by several transport companies. The operators that make up the ZVV are:

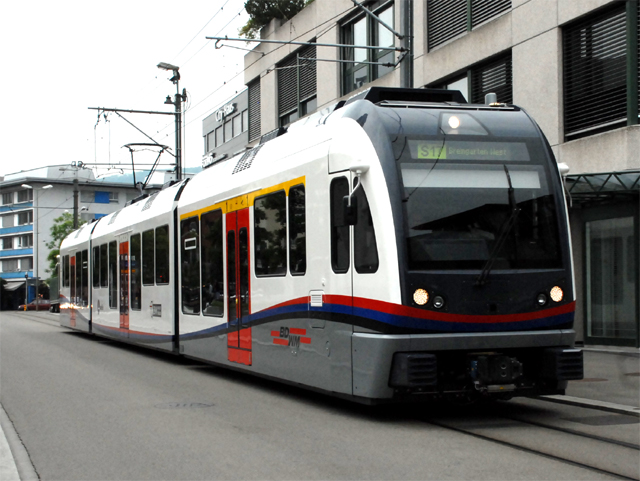
Aargau Verkehr AG (AVA)

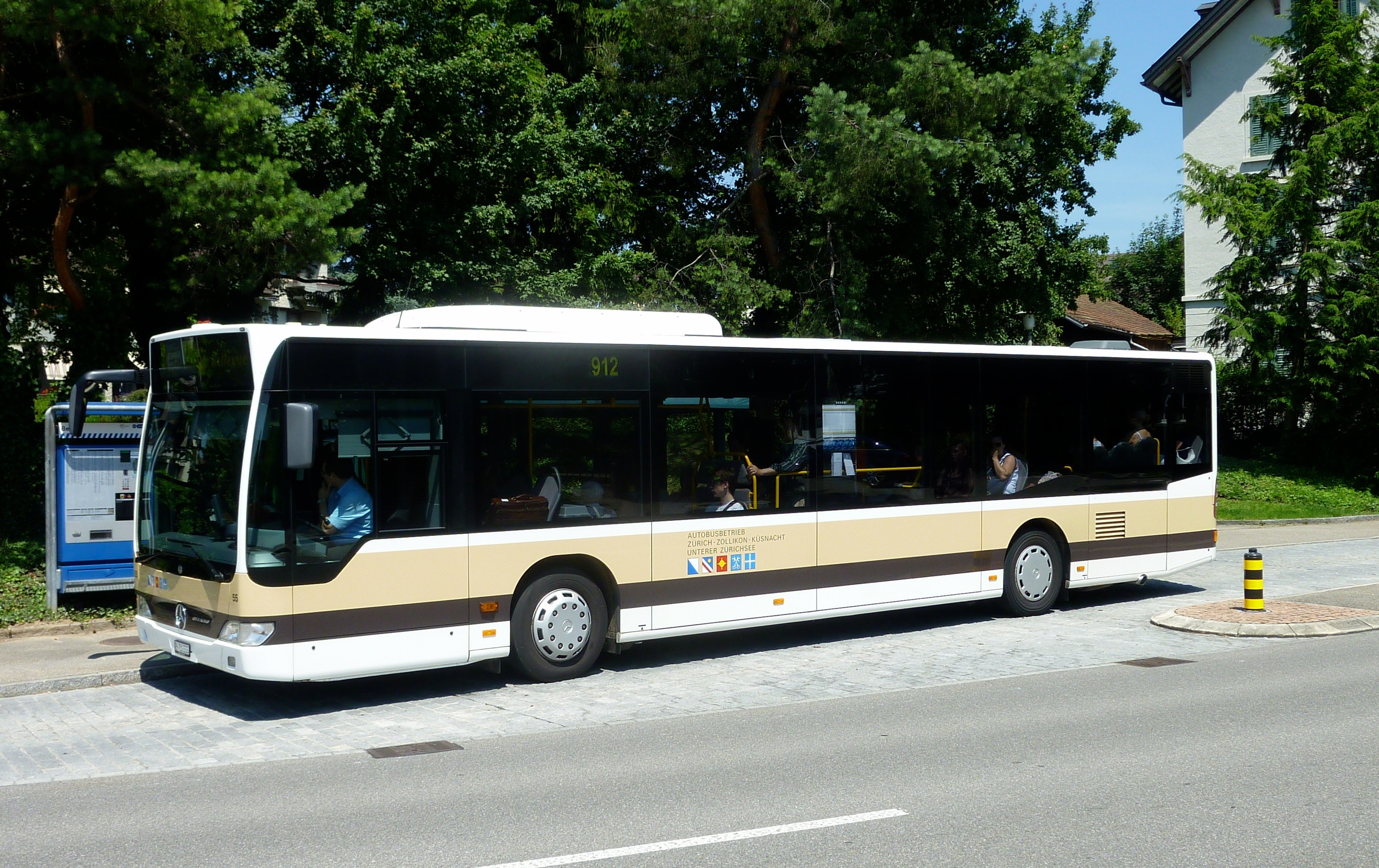
Autobusbetrieb Zürich–Zollikon–Küsnacht (AZZK)

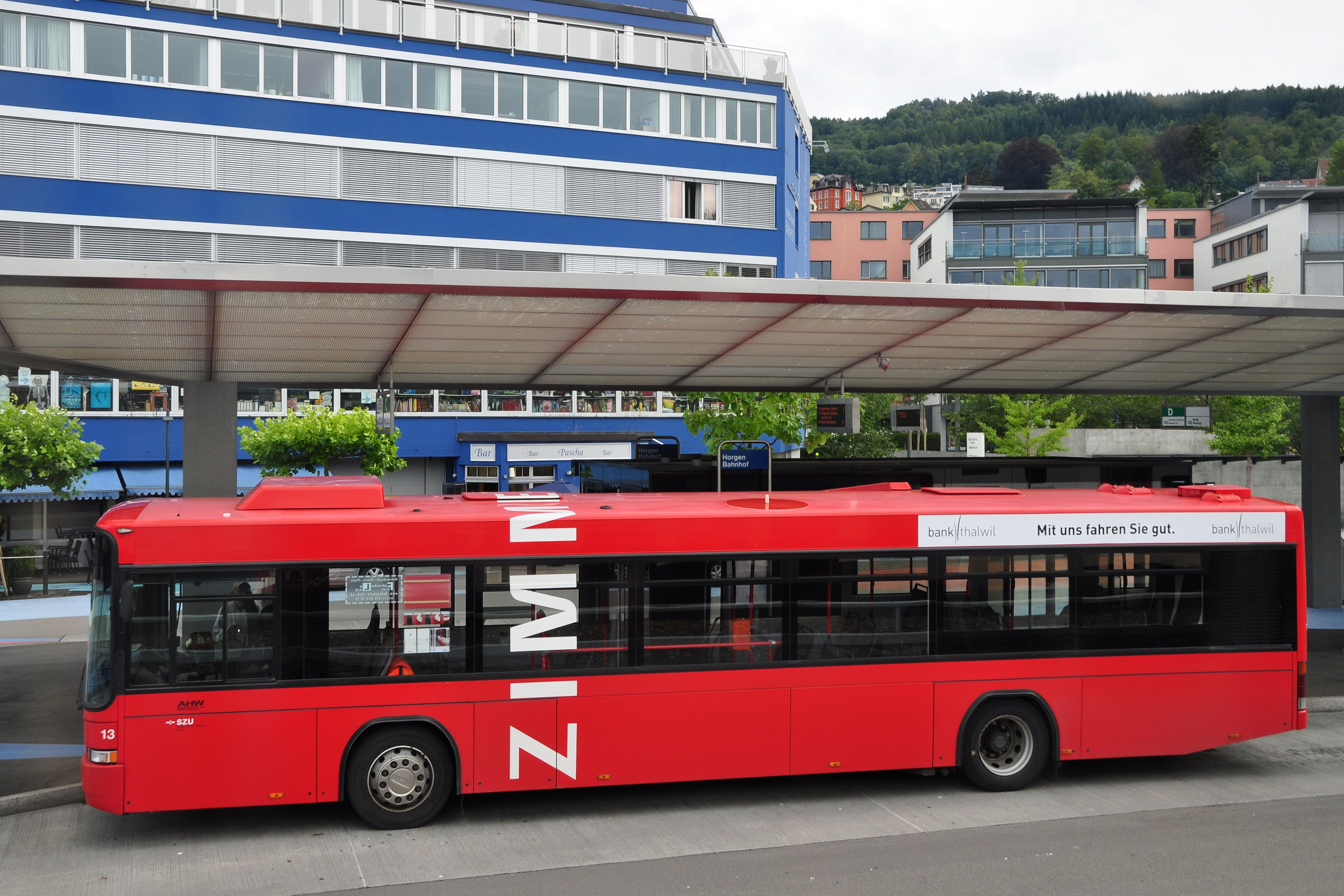
Busbetriebe Bamert (Zimmerbergbus)

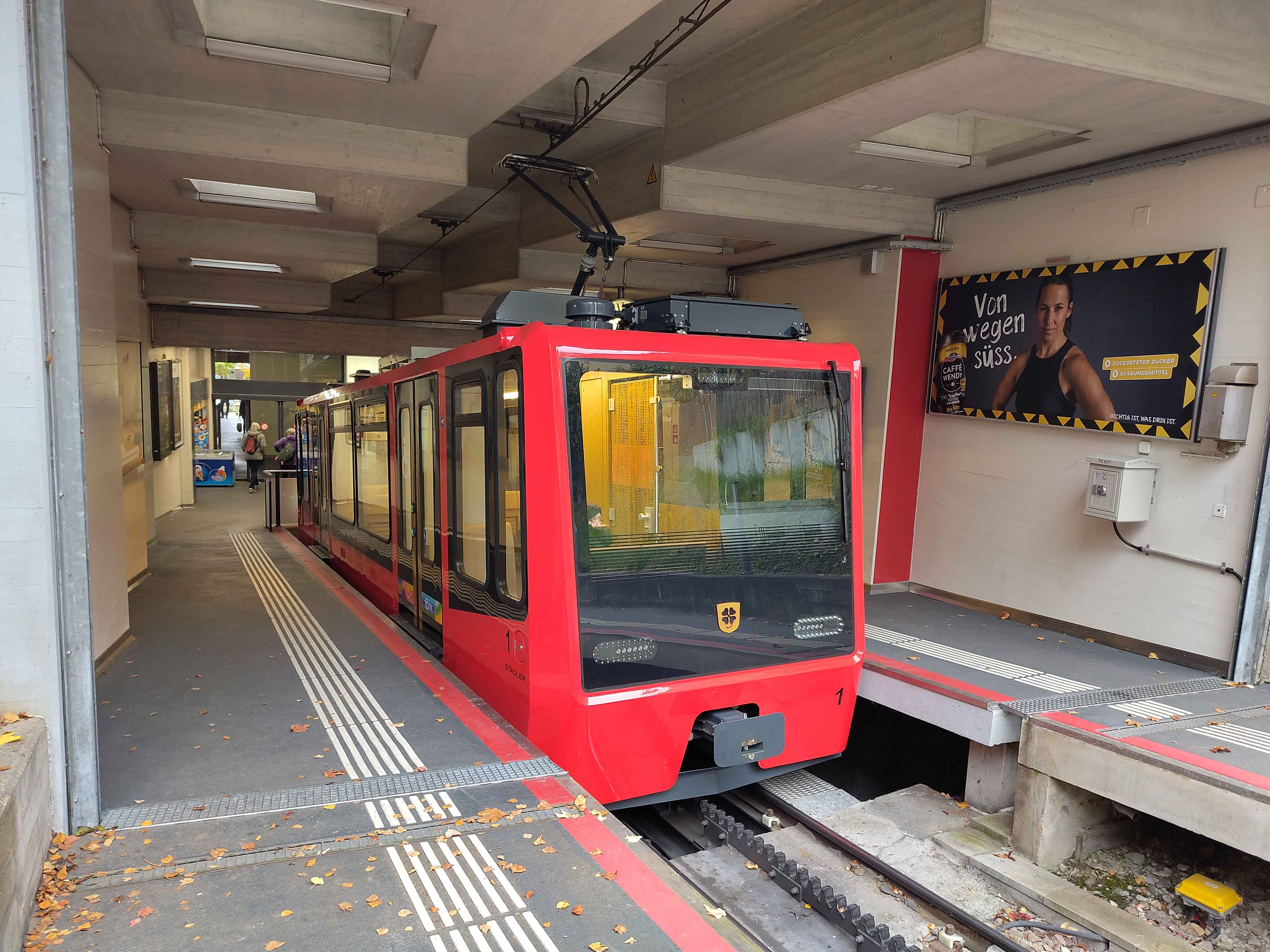
Dolderbahn

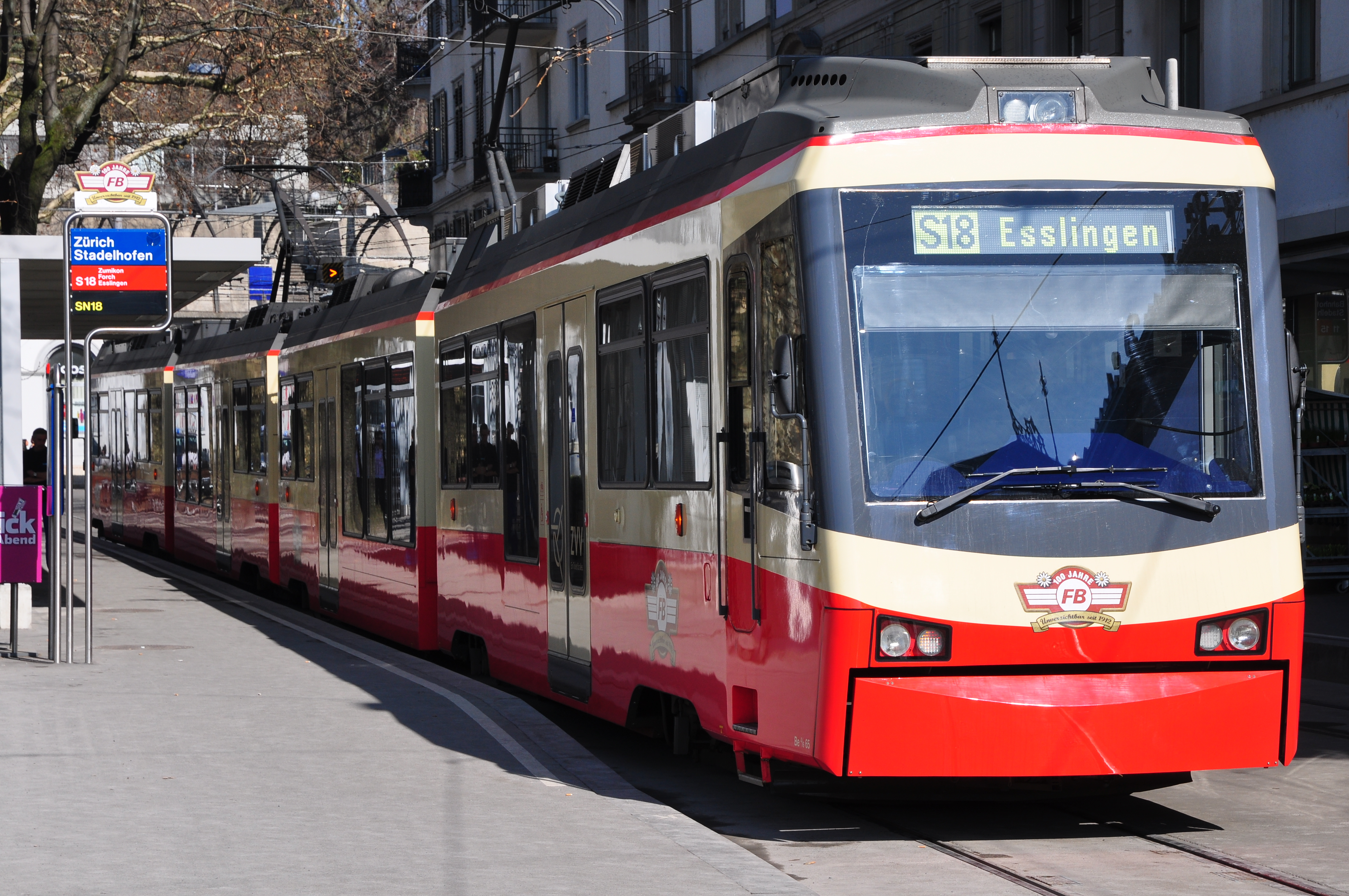
Forchbahn (FB)

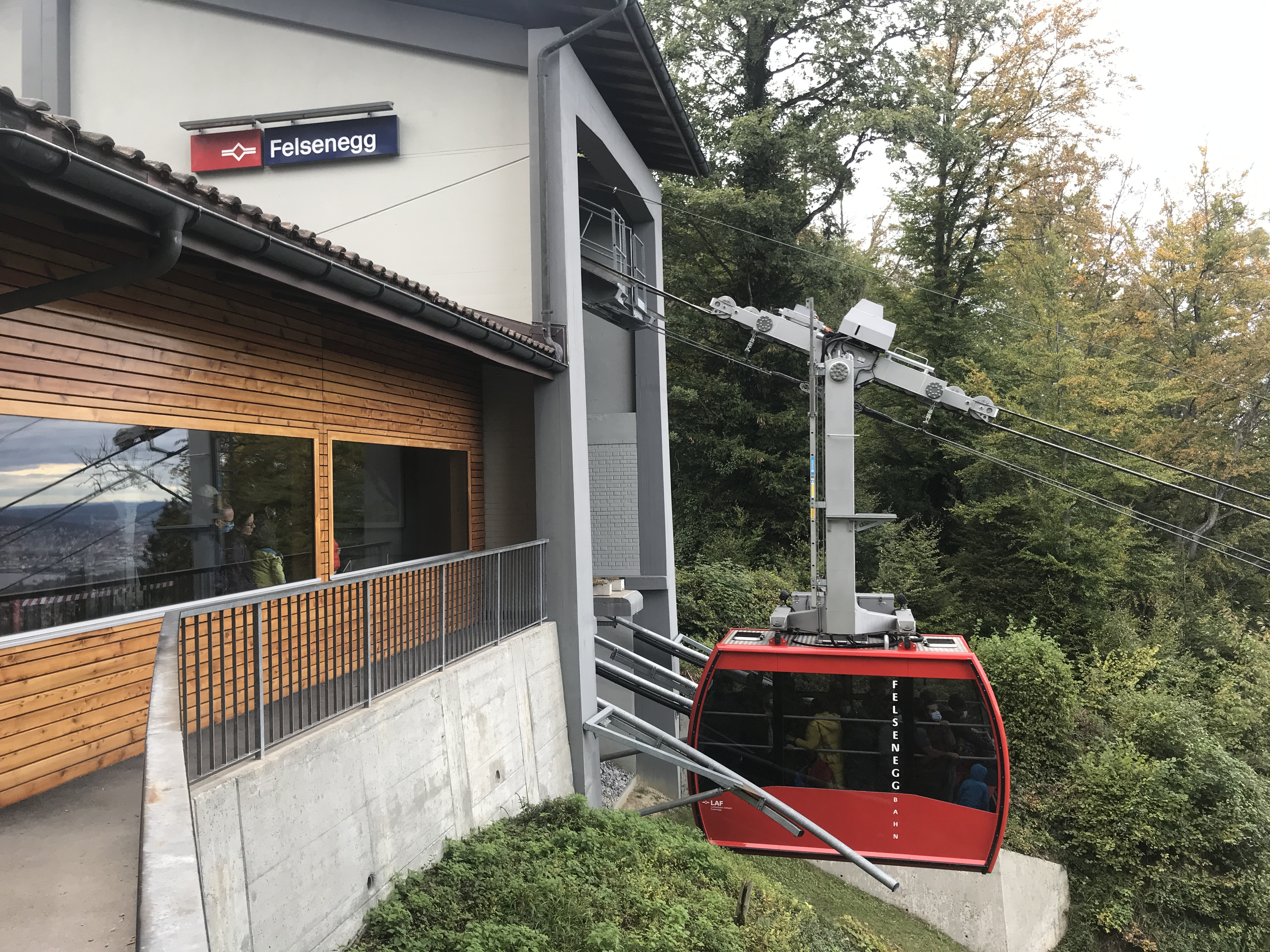
Luftseilbahn Adliswil-Felsenegg (LAF)

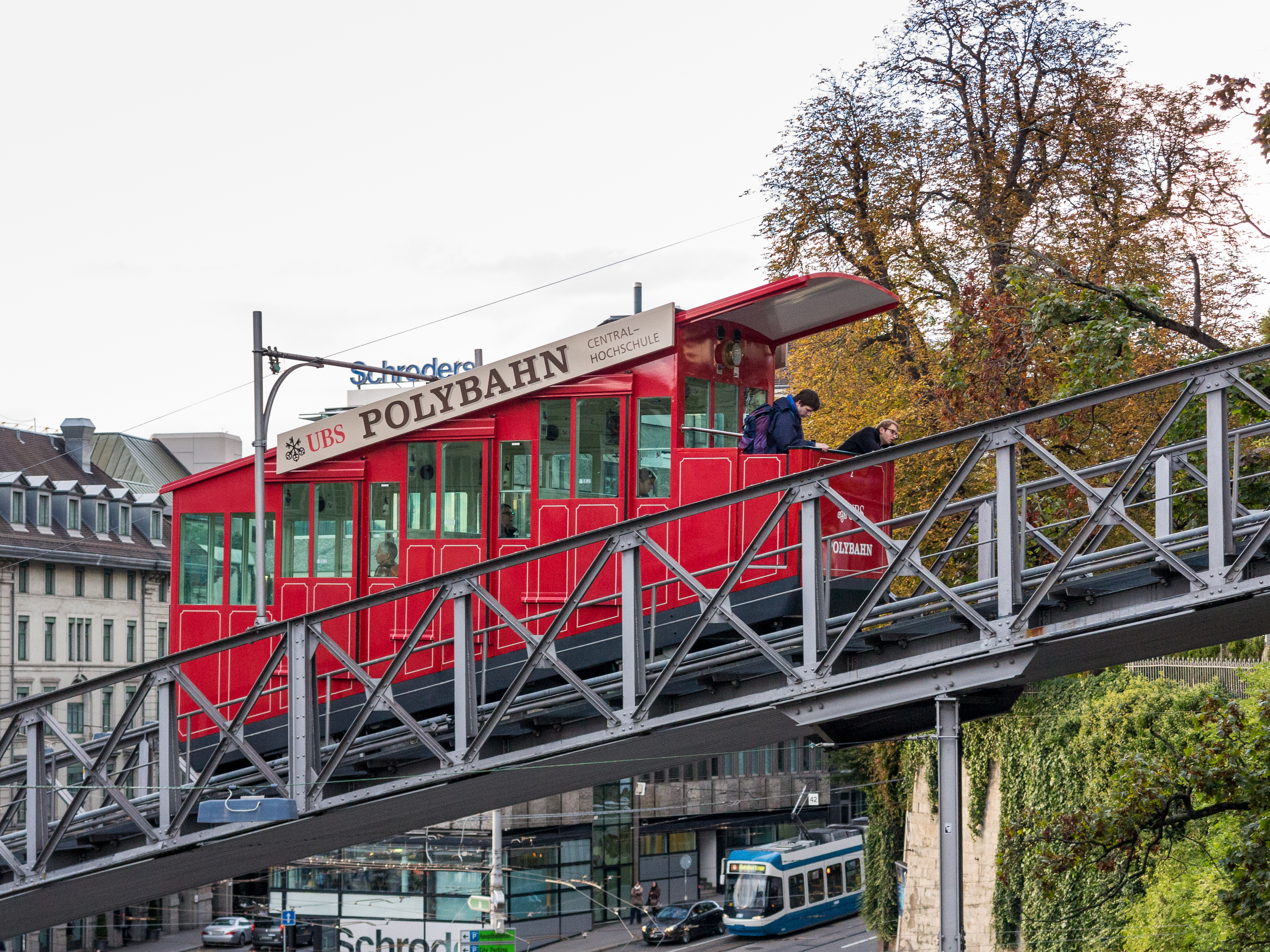
Polybahn

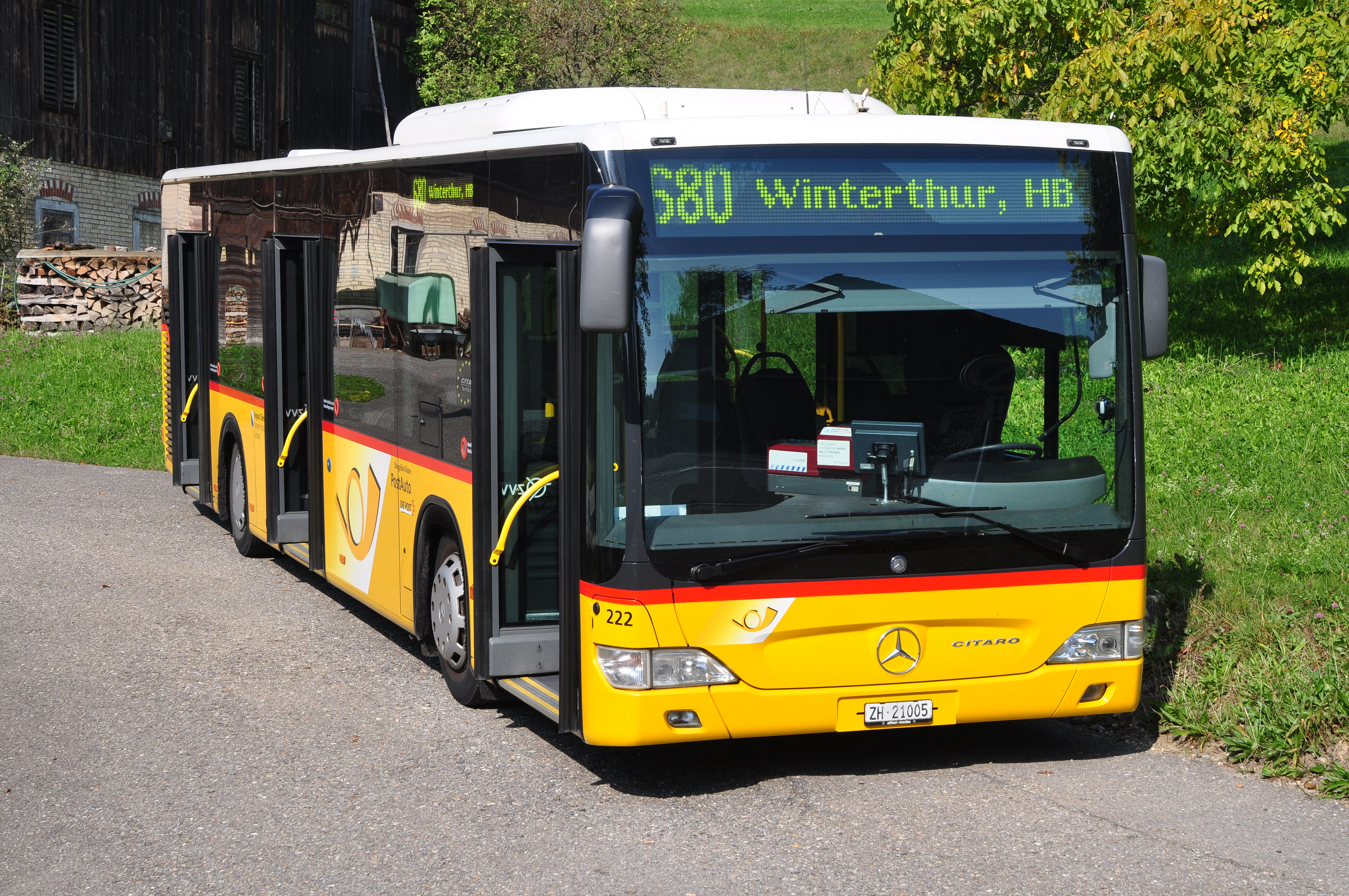
PostAuto Schweiz Region Zürich

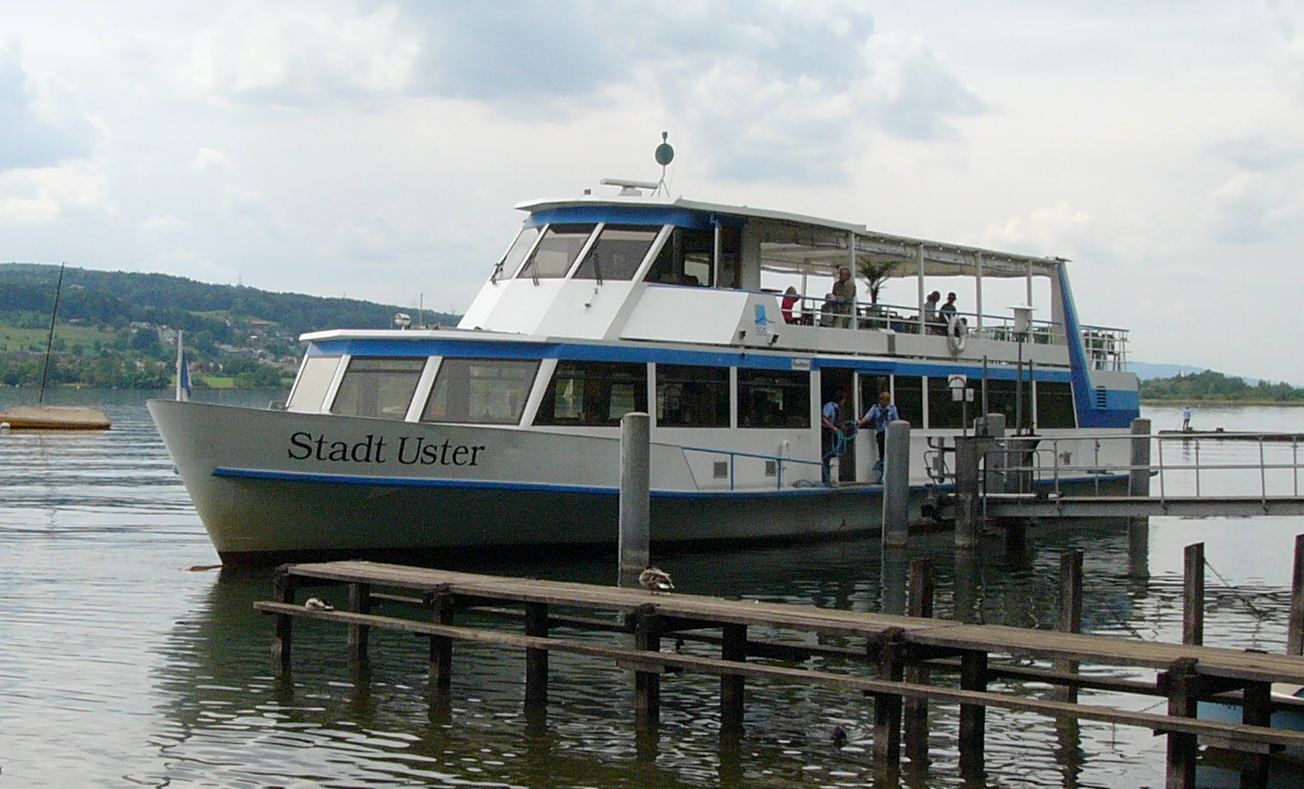
Schifffahrts-Genossenschaft Greifensee (SGG)

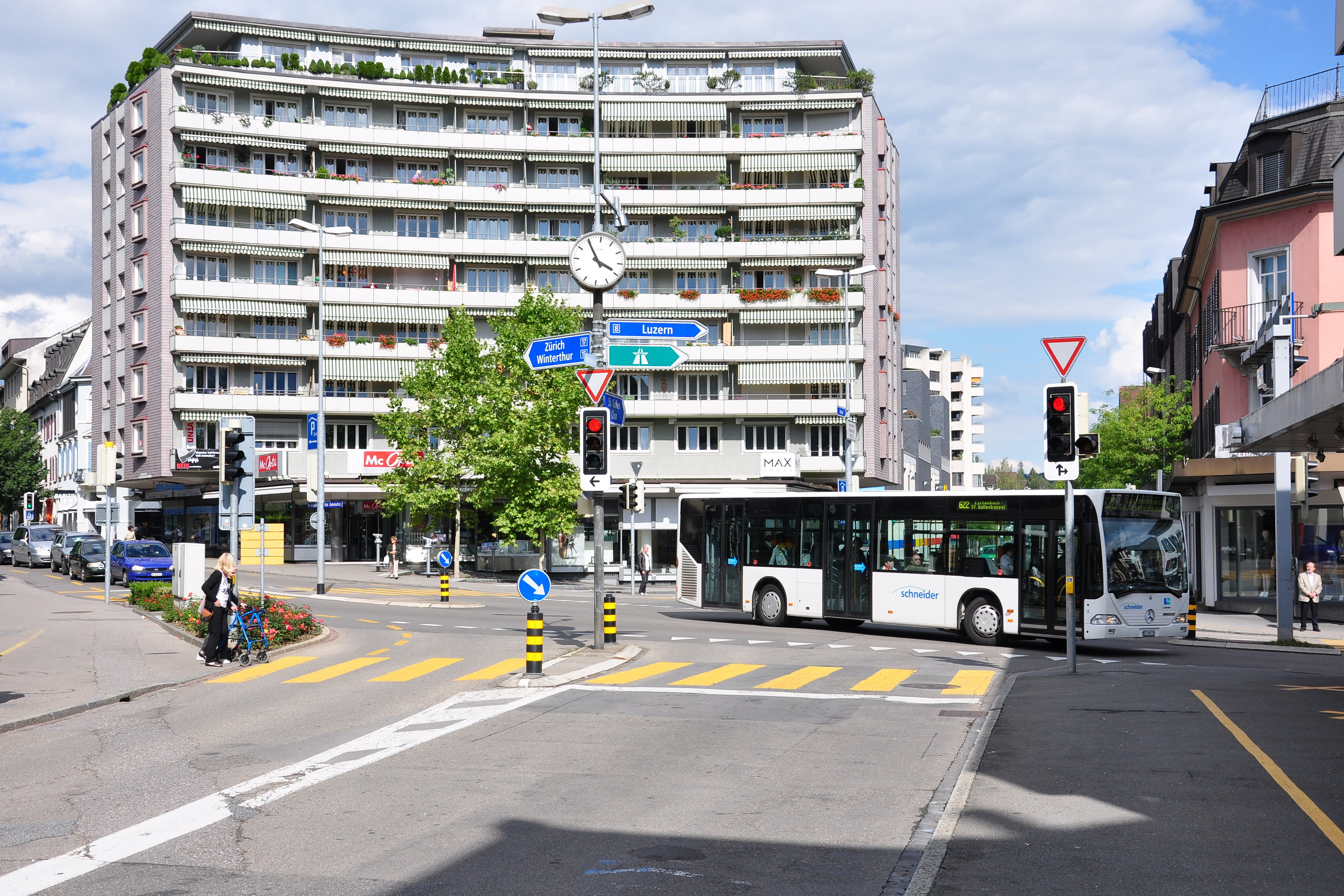
Schneider Busbetriebe

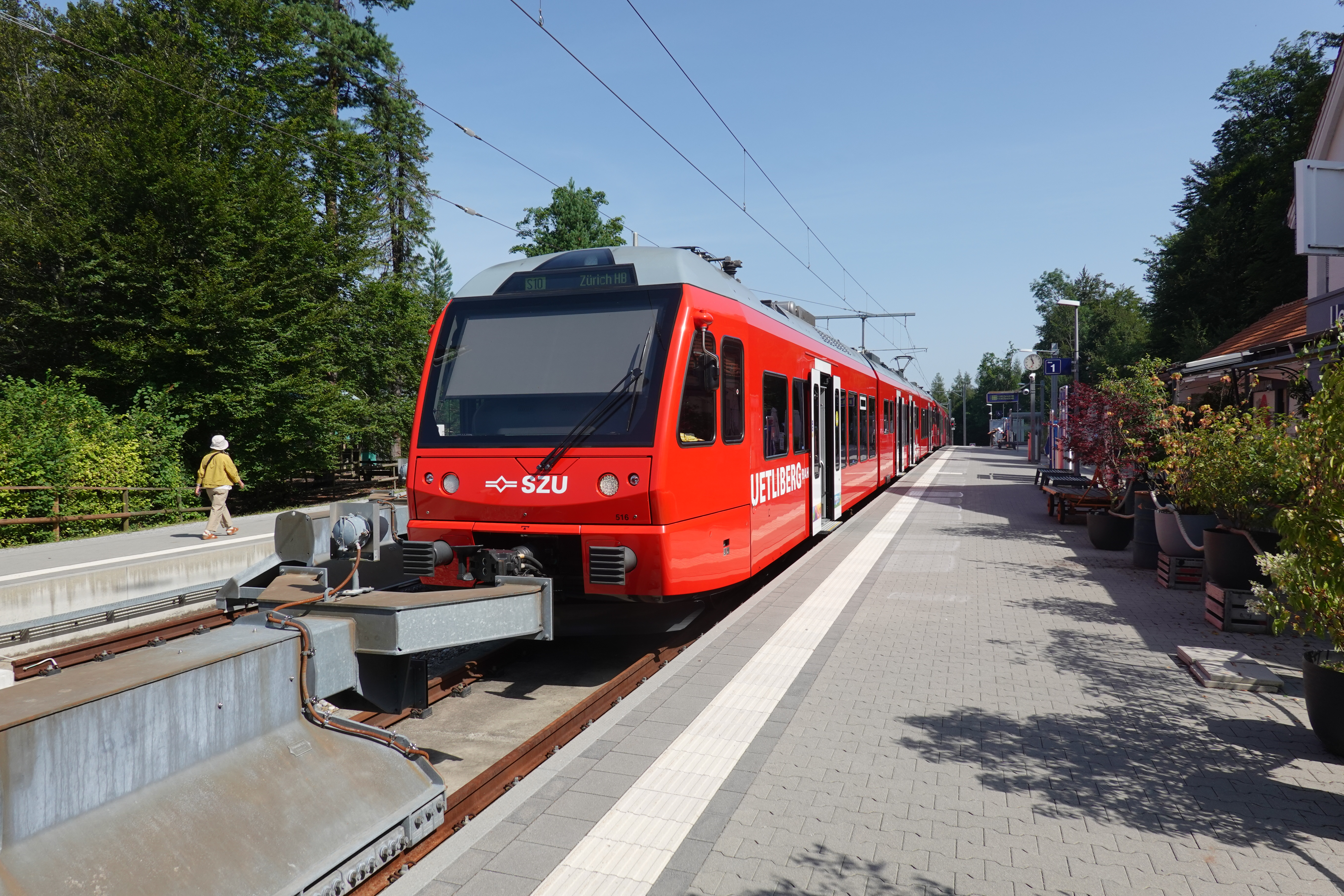
Sihltal Zürich Uetliberg Bahn (SZU)

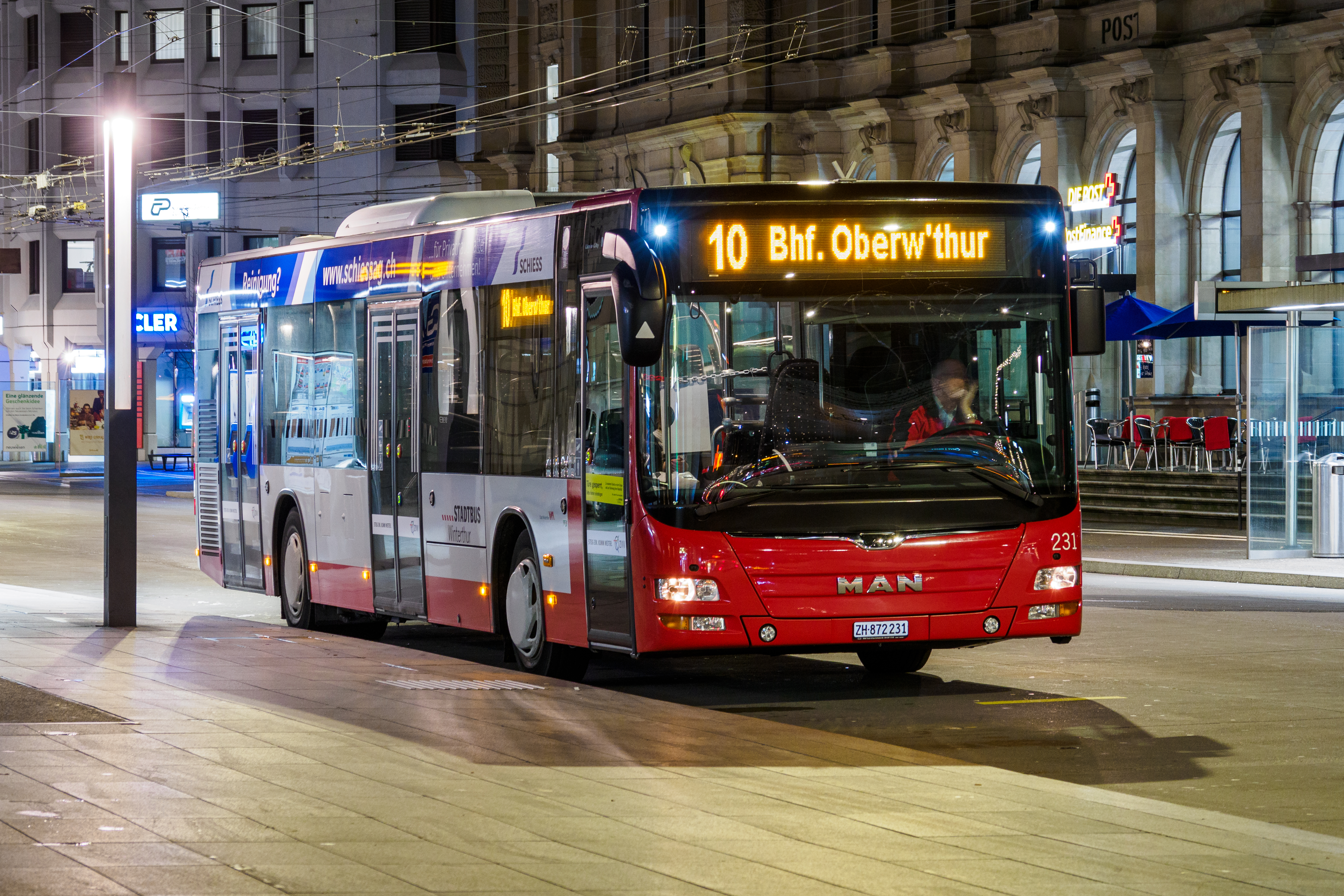
Stadtbus Winterthur

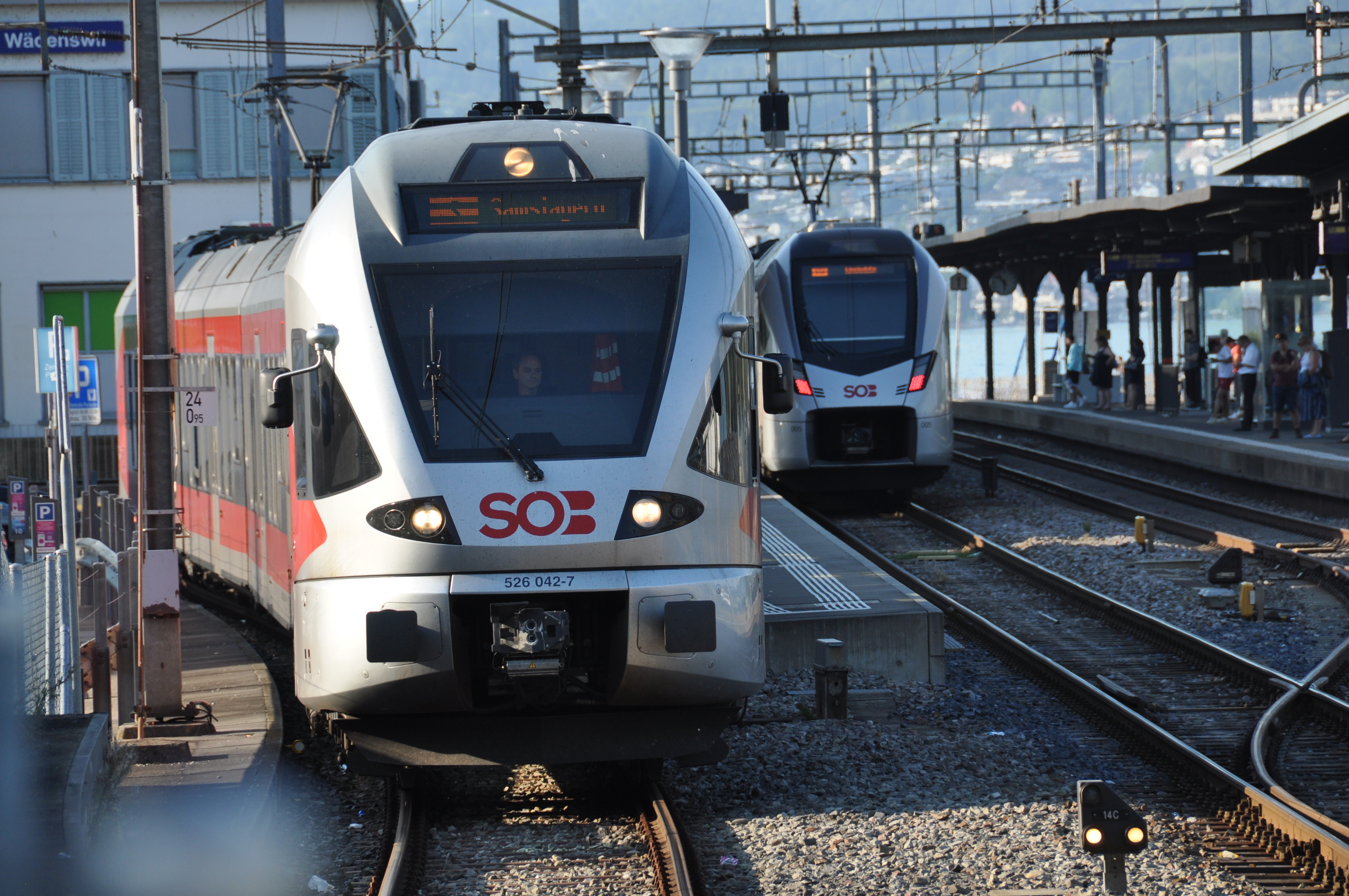
Südostbahn (SOB)

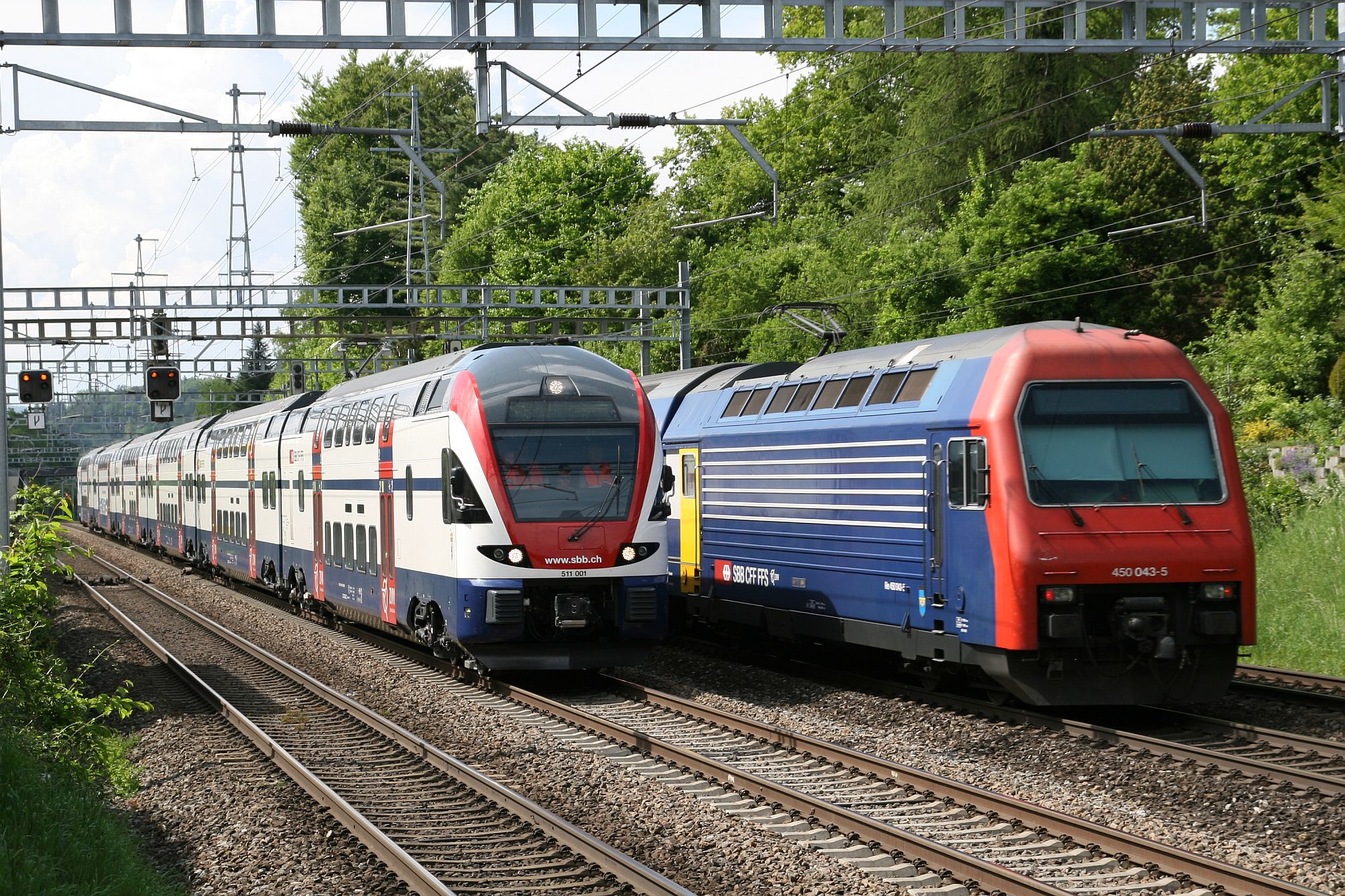
Swiss Federal Railways (SBB CFF FFS)

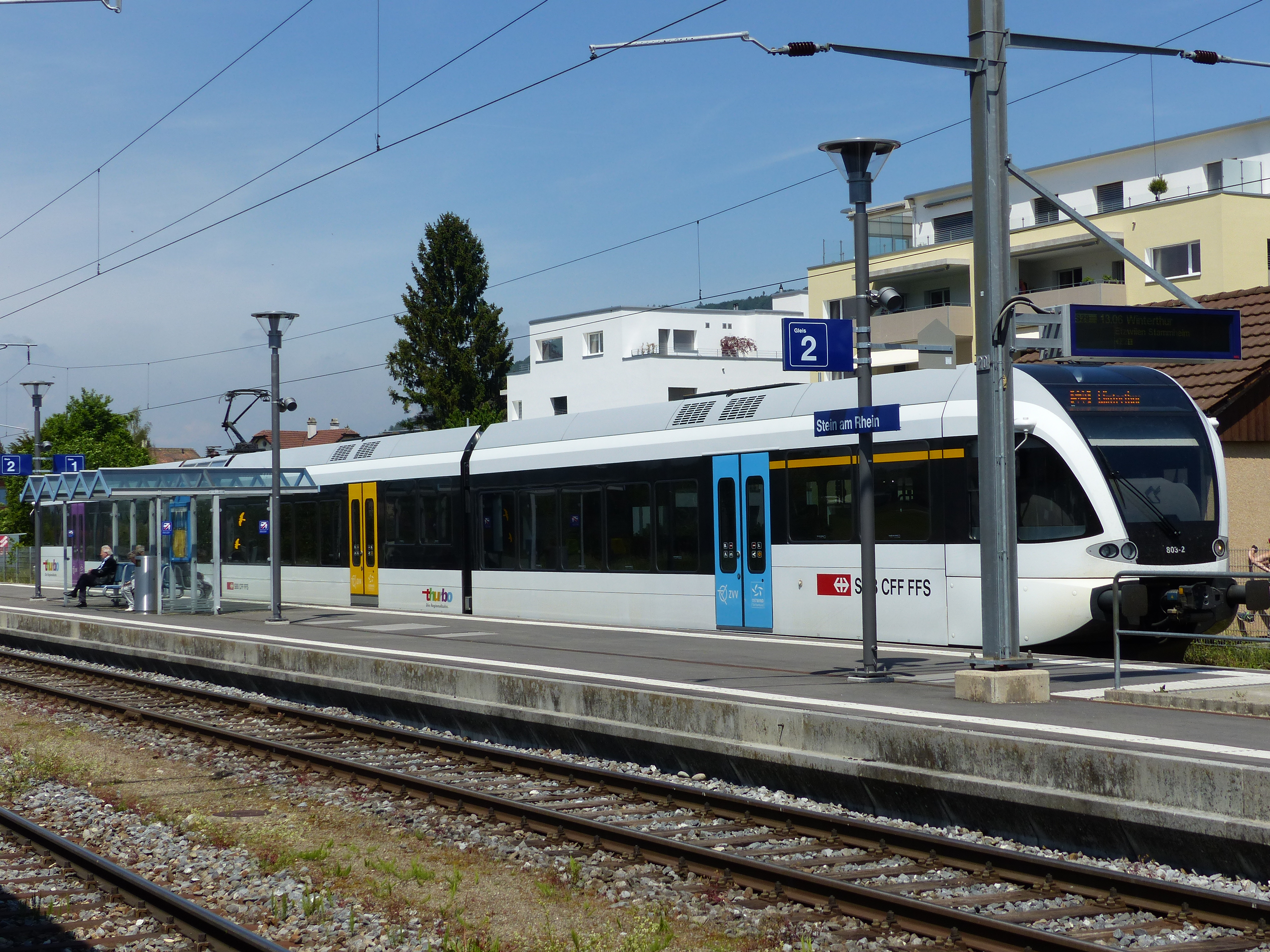
Thurbo

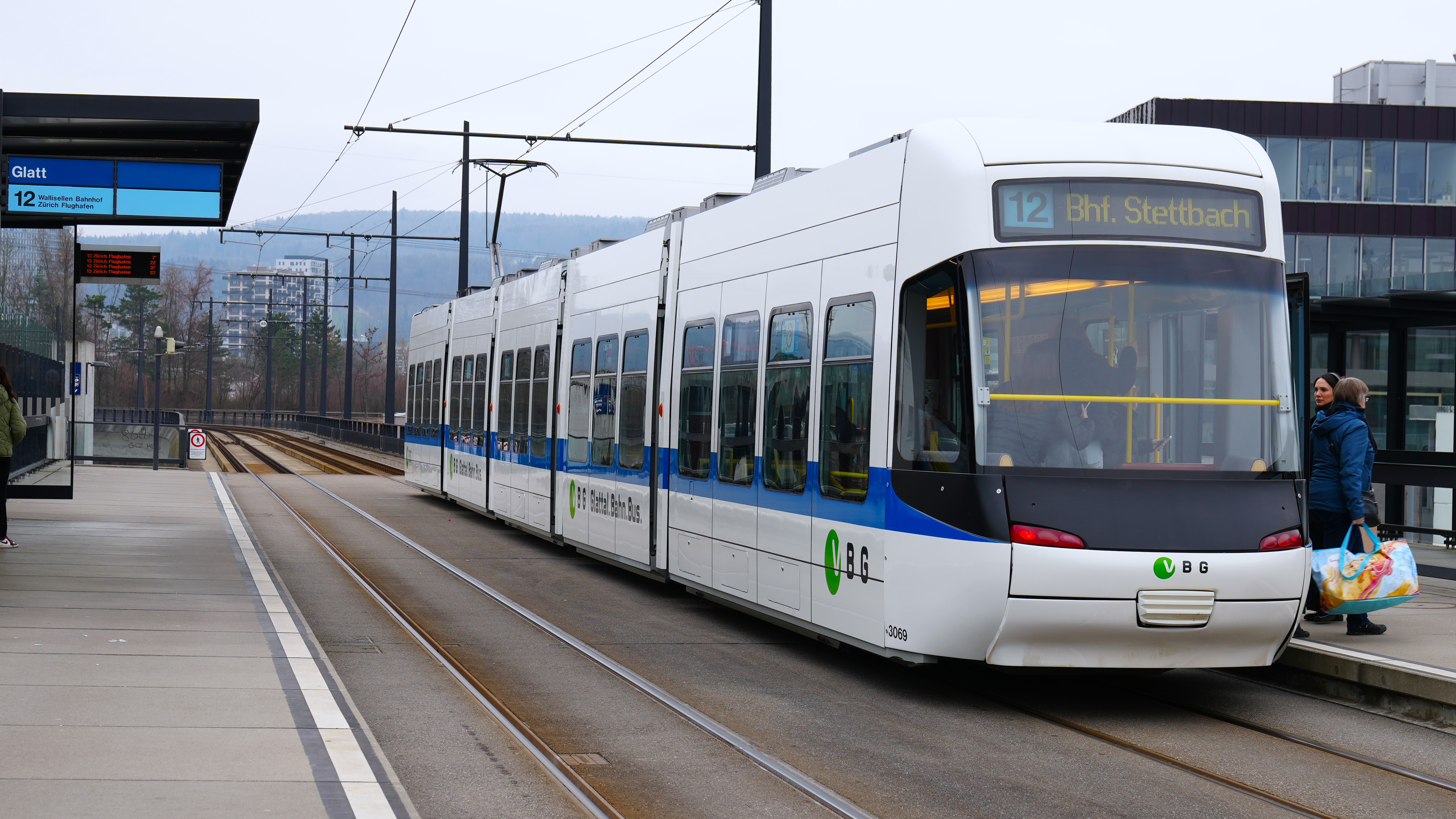
Verkehrsbetriebe Glattal (VBG)

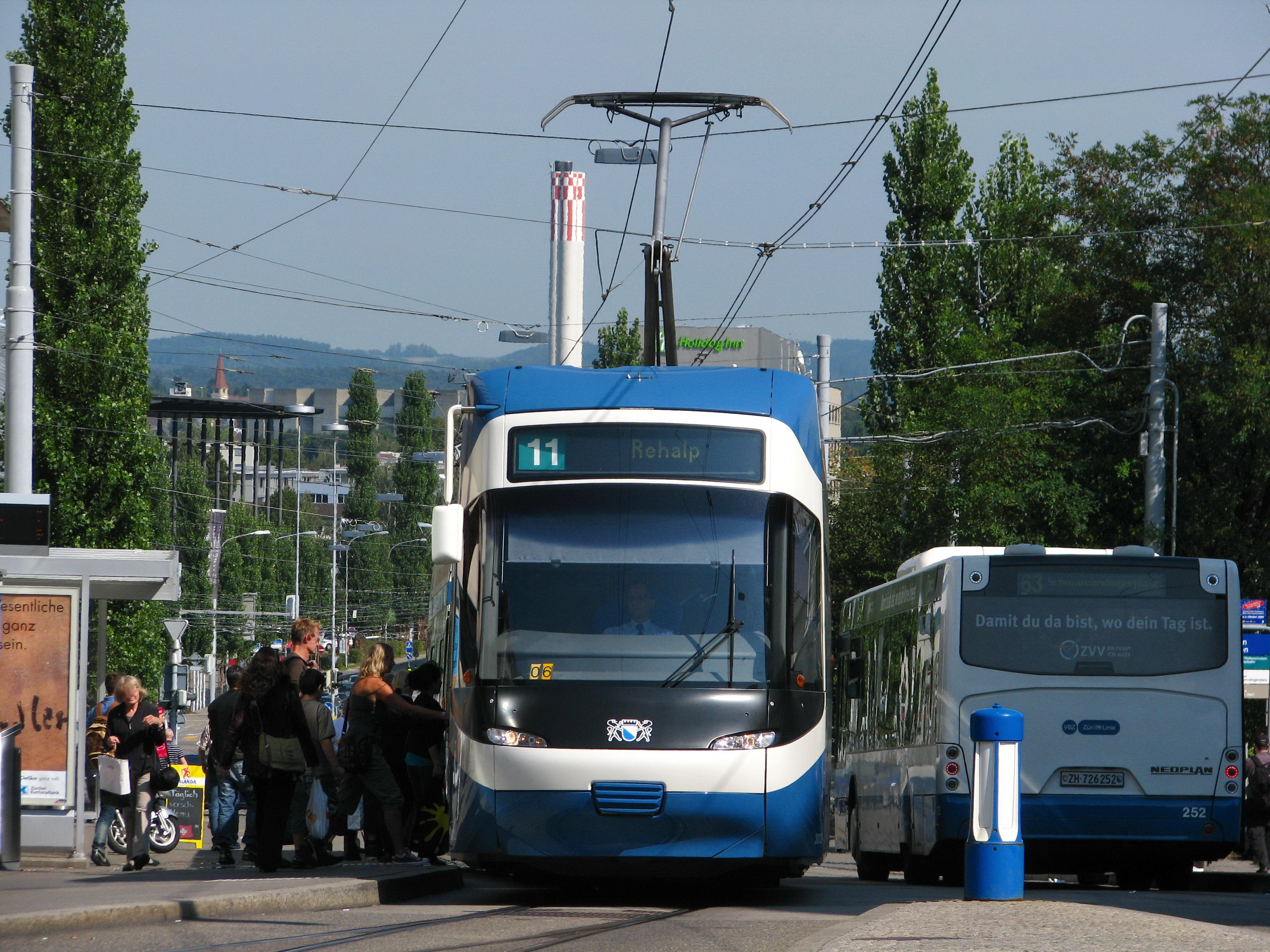
Verkehrsbetriebe Zürich (VBZ)

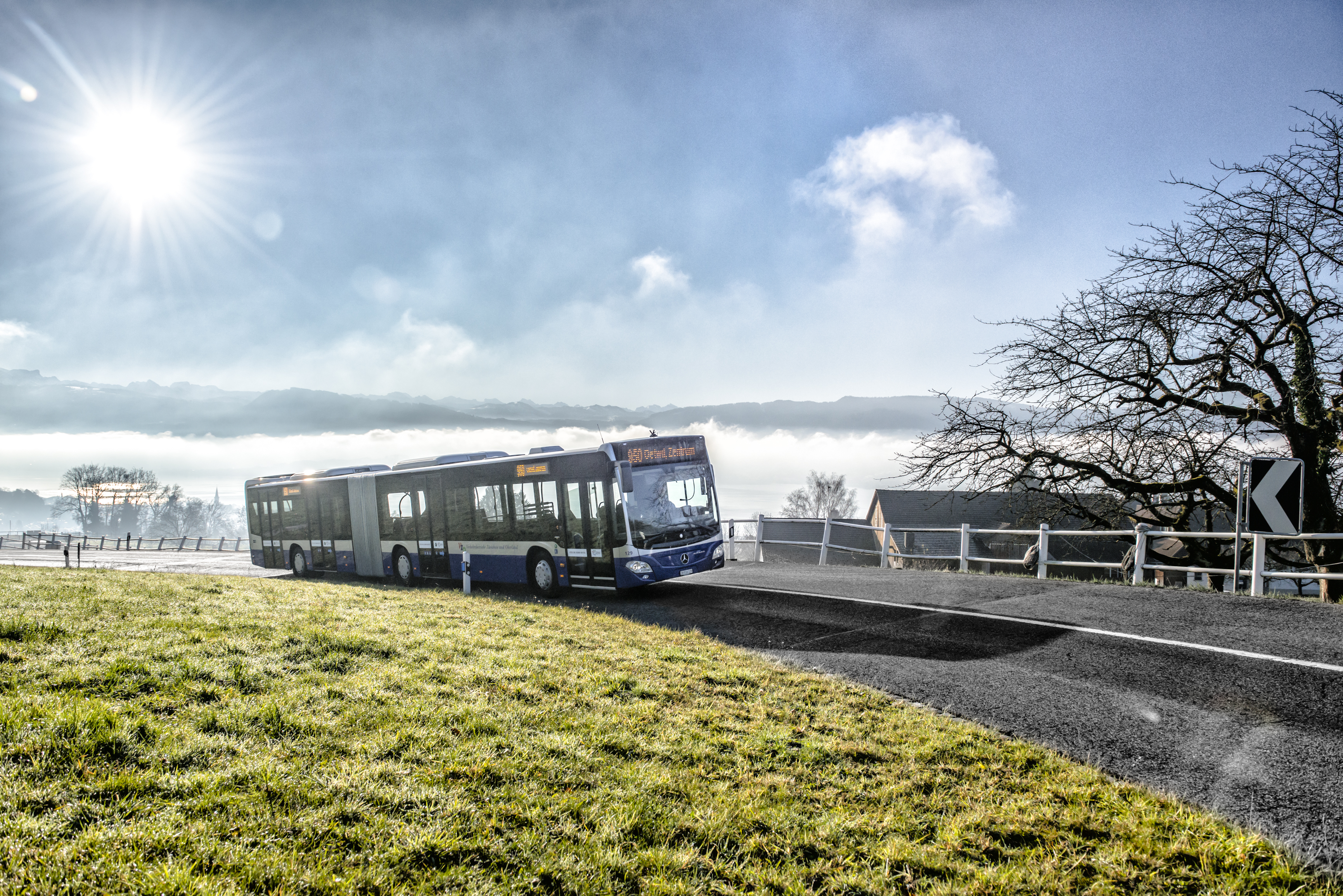
Verkehrsbetriebe Zürichsee und Oberland (VZO)

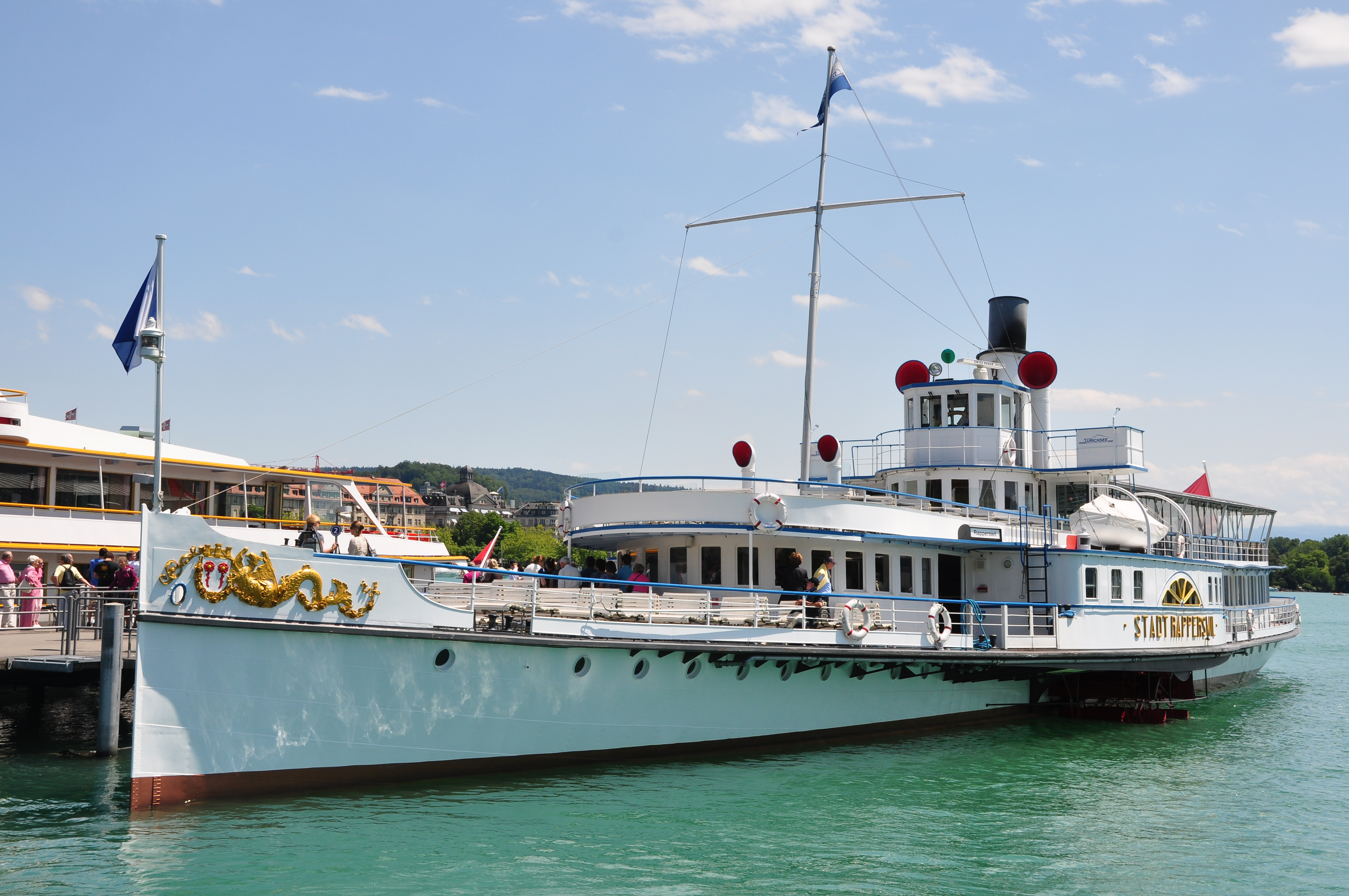
Zürichsee-Schifffahrtsgesellschaft (ZSG)

== Leadership ==
The current director of the ZVV is Dominik Brühwiler, appointed 1. January 2021. Dominik Brühwiler was Head of the Traffic Planning Department and Deputy Director for 13 years. Over 60 people applied for the position of Director and the Swiss Department for Transport picked him because of his past experience in the service.

== See also ==
- Public transport in Zurich
- List of Swiss tariff networks
