= Ruth Nivon Machoud =

Swiss triathlete

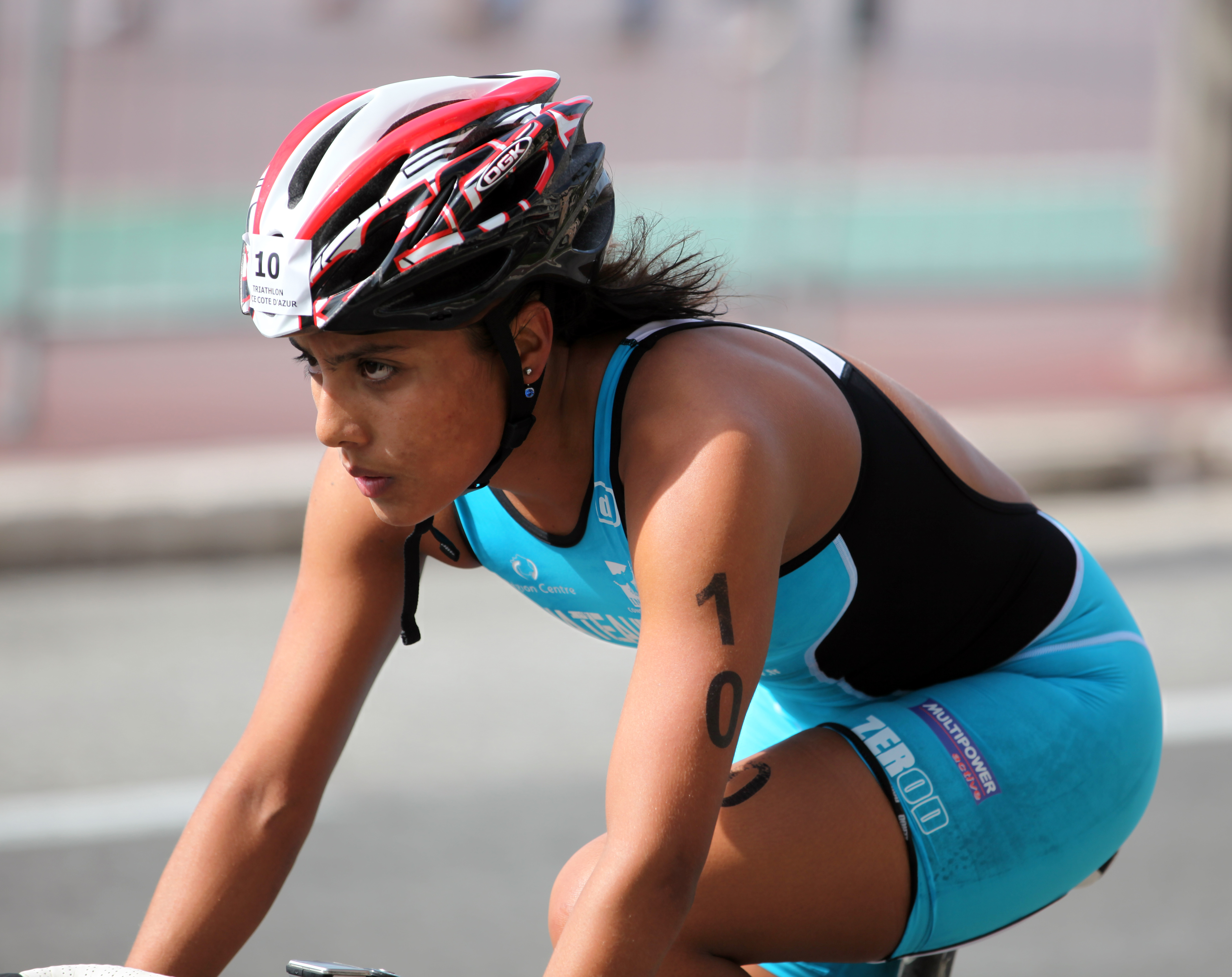
Ruth Nivon Machoud at the French Club Championship Series triathlon in Nice, 2011.

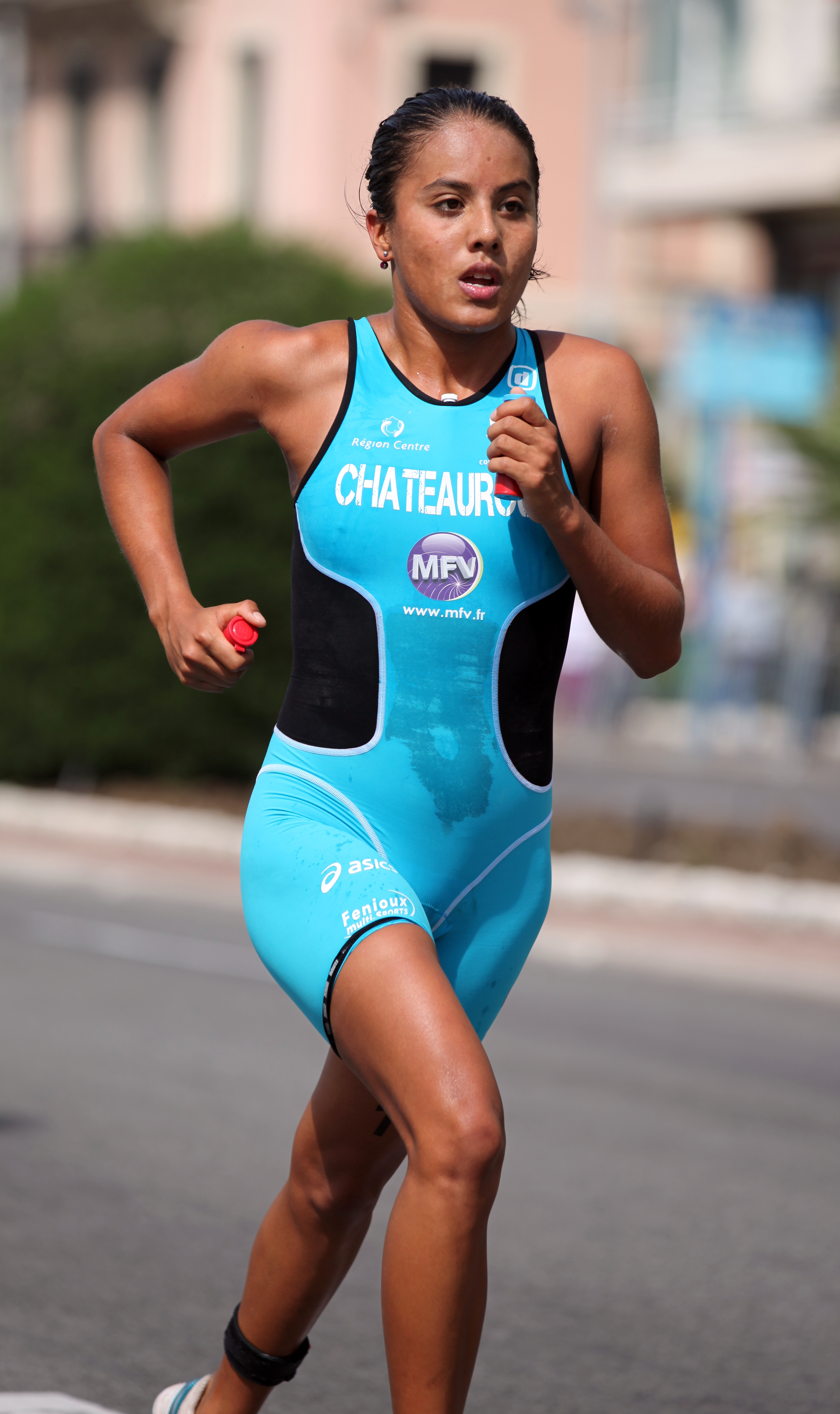
Ruth Nivon Machoud at the Grand Prix de Triathlon in Nice, 2011.

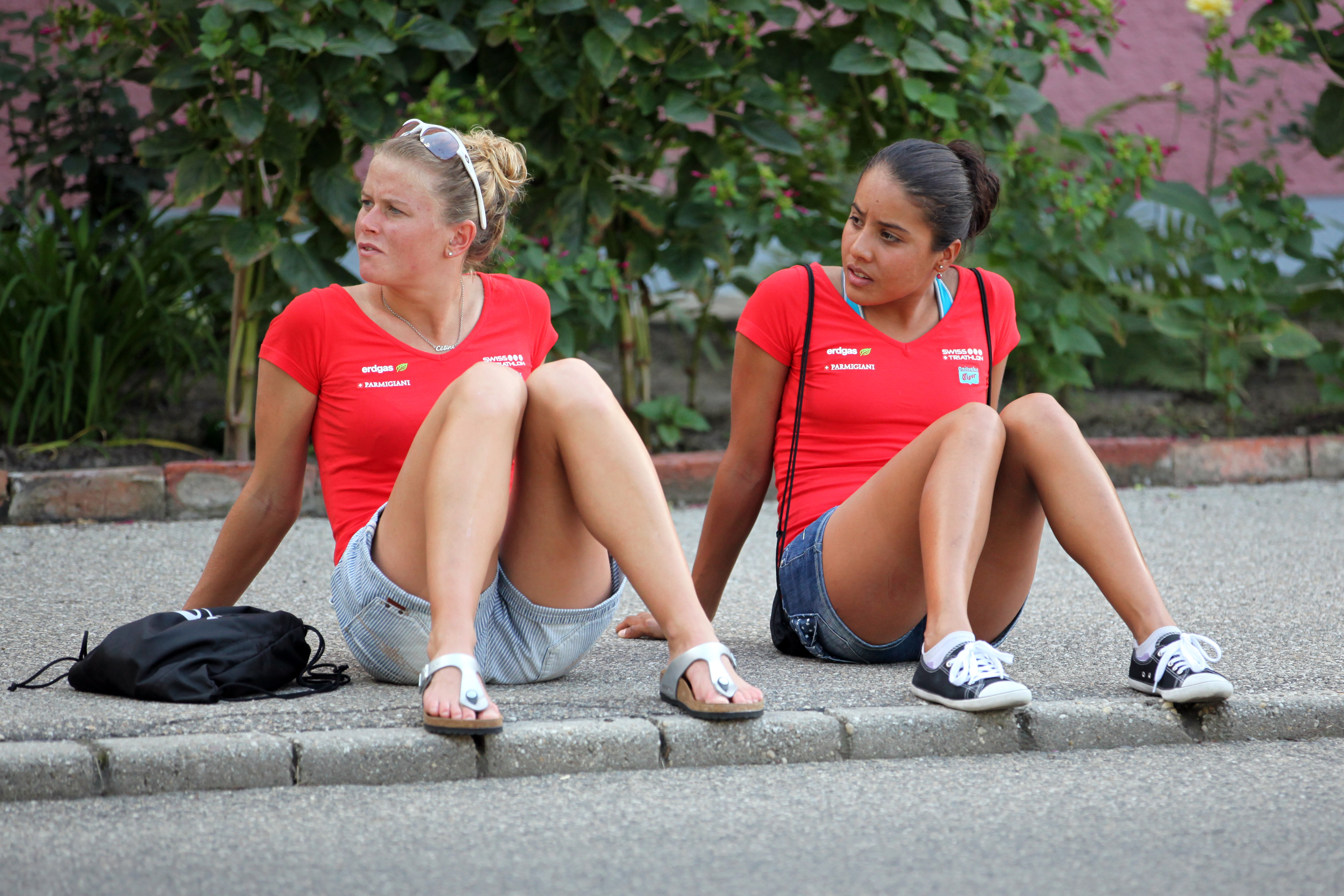
Nivon Machoud with her teammate Celine Schärer at the World Cup in Tiszaújváros, 2011.

Ruth Nivon Machoud (born 21 August 1990) is a Mexican-Swiss professional triathlete and since 2009 member of the Swiss National Team.

Since 2006 Ruth Nivon Machoud has taken part in ITU events. In 2007, she placed first at the Junior Aquathlon World Championships, in 2008 she won the silver medal at the Junior Duathlon World Championships, and in 2009 she placed seventh at the European Junior Triathlon Championships.

Nivon won 10 medals for Oaxaca at the Olimpiada Nacional from 2005 to 2009.

Ruth Nivon Machoud also takes part in prestigious non ITU events. In 2010, for instance, she placed eight at the Ironman 70.3 Asia Pacific Championships in Phuket. In France, Ruth Nivon Machoud takes part in the prestigious Club Championship Series Lyonnaise des Eaux and represents the club TCC 36. At the opening triathlon of the season 2011 in Nice (24 April 2011), Nivon placed 31st and was not among the three triathlètes classants l'équipe, all of whom were foreign elite stars (Melanie Annaheim, Ricarda Lisk, and Céline Schärer).

Ruth Nivon Machoud lives in Mexico (Oaxaca) and in Switzerland (Fully, Valais). Her mother, Corinne Machoud, is a Spanish teacher and triathlon coach, her father, Sergio Nivón, is a doctor, together they own the San Felipe Academy in Oaxaca.

In 2009, Ruth Nivon Machoud won a law case against the Mexican Triathlon federation which disallowed her to take part in the Olimpiada Nacional because Ruth Nivon had declared to represent Switzerland in ITU events from 31 March 2009 onwards.

== ITU Competitions ==
In the five years from 2006 to 2010, Ruth Nivon Machoud took part in 12 ITU events and achieved five top ten positions. The following list is based upon the official ITU rankings and the ITU Athletes's Profile Page. Unless indicated otherwise, the following events are triathlons (Olympic Distance) and refer to the Elite category.

| Date | Competition | Place | Rank |
|---|---|---|---|
| 2006-09-02 | World Championships (Junior) | Lausanne | 57 |
| 2007-05-12 | Aquathlon World Championships (Age Group 18–19) | Ixtapa | 1 |
| 2007-05-12 | Aquathlon World Championships (Junior) | Ixtapa | 1 |
| 2007-08-30 | BG World Championships (Junior) | Hamburg | 19 |
| 2008-04-19 | Pan American Championships (Junior) | Mazatlan | 2 |
| 2008-06-05 | BG World Championships (Junior) | Vancouver | 21 |
| 2008-09-27 | Duathlon World Championships (Junior) | Rimini | 2 |
| 2008-10-26 | BG World Cup | Huatulco | DNF |
| 2009-07-02 | European Championships (Junior) | Holten | 7 |
| 2009-09-09 | Dextro Energy World Championship Series, Grand Final: Junior World Championships | Gold Coast | 39 |
| 2010-06-27 | Premium European Cup | Brasschaat | 18 |
| 2010-07-10 | World Cup | Holten | DNF |
| 2011-04-17 | World Cup | Ishigaki | 34 |
| 2011-05-29 | Premium European Cup | Brasschaat | DNF |
| 2011-07-09 | Premium European Cup | Holten | 5 |
| 2011-07-24 | European Cup | Geneva | 12 |
| 2011-08-14 | World Cup | Tiszaújváros | 35 |
