= Annaheim =

Annaheim may refer to:

- Melanie Annaheim, a Swiss triathlete
- Annaheim, Saskatchewan
- Annaheim meteorite, an iron meteorite recovered in 1916

== See also ==
- Anaheim (disambiguation)
