= Steinhauser =

Steinhauser, Steinhäuser or Steinhäußer (Steinhaeusser) may refer to:

- Albert Steinhauser (born 1971), Austrian politician
- Carl Johann Steinhäuser (1813–1879), German academic sculptor
- Georg Steinhauser (born 2001), German cyclist
- Günther Steinhauser, Italian luger
- Harald Steinhauser, Italian luger
- Jan Steinhauser (1944–2022), Dutch rower
- Karl Steinhauser, Austrian political scientist
- Mary Steinhauser (1942–1975), Canadian prison justice advocate
- Peter Steinhauser (1941–2021), Austrian geophysicist
- Tobias Steinhauser (born 1972), German cyclist and father of Georg

== Steinhäuser ==
- Adolph Steinhäuser (1825–1858), German sculptor, brother of Carl and Wilhelm Steinhäuser
- Carl Steinhäuser (1813–1879), German sculptor, brother of Adolph and Wilhelm Steinhäuser
- Karl Steinhäuser (died 1903), German organist and Royal Music Director of the St. Marien Church in Mühlhausen/Thüringen
- Margarethe Steinhäuser (1874–1955), Hessian politician
- Robert Steinhäuser (1983–2002), mass murderer and perpetrator of the Erfurt school massacre
- Wilhelm Steinhäuser (1817–1903), German painter, brother of Adolph and Carl Steinhäuser

== Steinhäußer ==
- Ernst Christoph Steinhäußer (1731–1811), German politician, Mayor of Durlach
- Fritz Steinhäußer, architect in Augsburg

== See also ==
- Sieben Steinhäuser, group of five dolmens on the Lüneburg Heath in the NATO training area of Bergen-Hohne, Lower Saxony, Germany
- Steinhaus (disambiguation)
- Steinhausen (disambiguation)
