= Céline Schärer =

Swiss triathlete (born 1990)

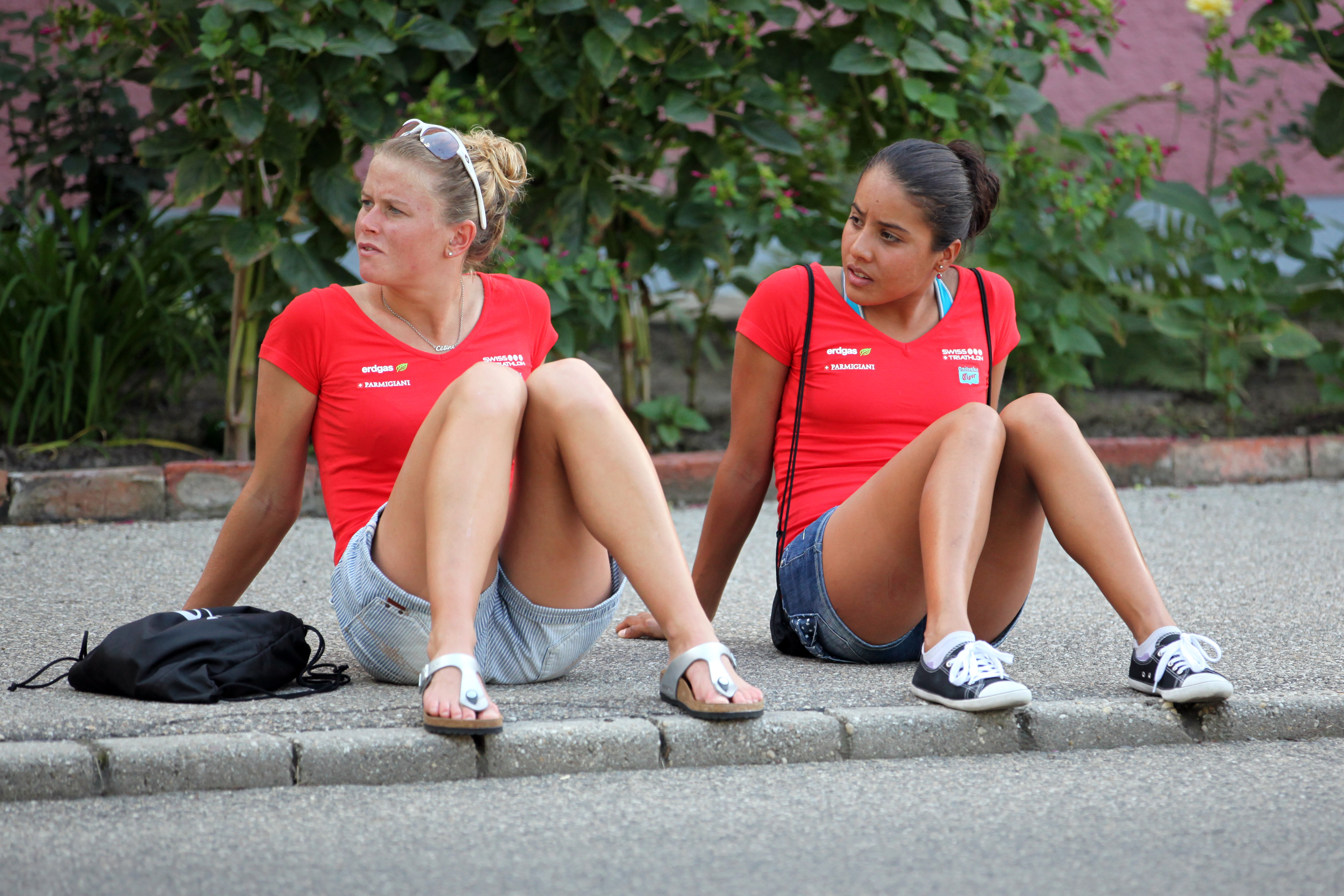
Schärer and her teammate Nivon Machoud at the World Cup in Tiszaújváros, 2011.

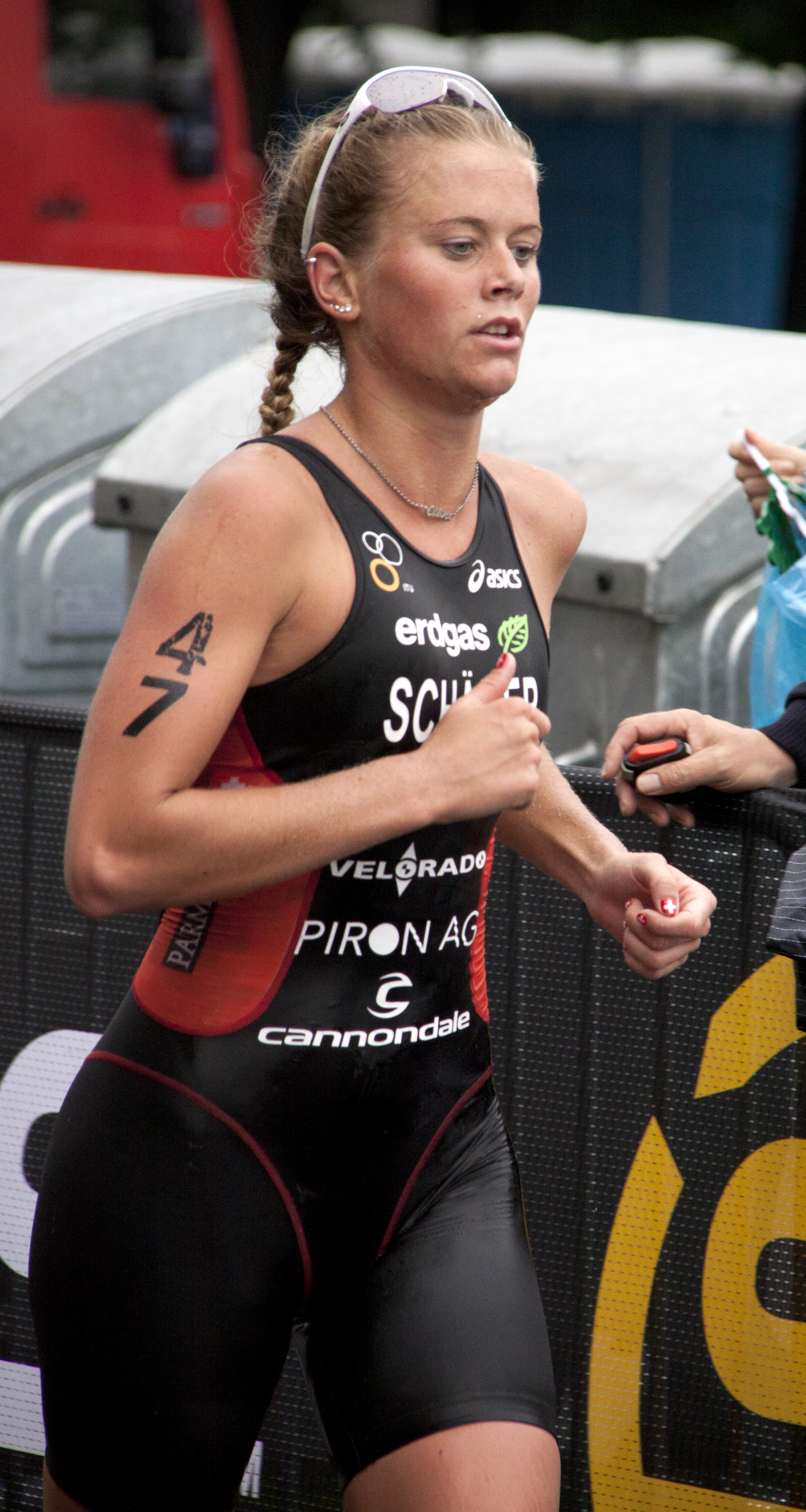
Céline Schärer at the U23 World Championships in Budapest, 2010.

Céline Schärer (born 9 February 1990) is a professional Swiss triathlete, National U23 Champion of the year 2010 and member of the National Team (Team Olympic Distance).

In 2006 Céline Schärer took part in her first ITU competition. In 2007, she placed 24th and 31st respectively in the Junior European and the Junior World Championships, and she won several national triathlons in her age category: Duathlon Irchel (13 May 2007, youth A), Aquathlon Basel (26 May 2007, youth A), Triathlon Murthen (10 June 2007, junior), and Zyttrum Triathlon (16 June 2007, youth A).

In 2008 and 2009 she achieved four top ten positions in Junior European Cups, in Switzerland she won the Zürich Triathlon (12 July 2008) and the Uster Triathlon (24 August 2008, junior), in 2009 she won the VW Circuit (junior) and placed second in the National Junior Championships. In 2010, she placed 9th in the European U23 Championships and 23rd in the World U23 Championships.

In Switzerland, Céline Schärer represents the swimming club Schwimmclub Frauenfeld and the triathlon club Tri Team Zugerland (Triathlon Checkpoint Zugerland).

Since 2008 Céline Schärer also takes part in the prestigious French Club Championship Series Lyonnaise des Eaux, first for the club Ste. Geneviève, since 2009 for Tri Club Chateauroux 36. In Paris (18 July 2010) she placed 35th, at the Grand Final of this circuit in La Baule (18 September 2010) she placed 30th and, as the second best of her club, was still among the three triathlètes classants l'équipe. Most of the Lyonnaise des Eaux triathletes of Tri Chateaueoux are foreign elite stars like Ricarda Lisk, Magali Messmer, Daniela Ryf, Melanie Annaheim or Schärer's teammate in the National team, Ruth Nivon Machoud.

Céline Schärer lives in Steinhausen and finished the Fachmittelschule, a kind of high school, in Zug.

== ITU Competitions ==
Unless indicated otherwise the following competitions are triathlons (Olympic Distance) and belong to the Elite category. The list is based upon the official ITU rankings and the athlete's ITU Profile Page.

Date	Competition	Place	Rank
2006-06-23	European Championships (Junior)	Autun	26
2007-06-29	European Championships (Junior)	Copenhagen	24
2007-08-30	BG World Championships (Junior)	Hamburg	31
2008-05-10	European Championships (Junior)	Lisbon	13
2008-06-28	European Cup (Junior)	Holten	7
2008-09-06	European Cup (Junior)	Pulpí	2
2009-06-06	European Cup (Junior)	Vienna	6
2009-06-20	European Cup (Junior)	Tarzo Revine	5
2009-07-02	European Championships (Junior)	Holten	20
2009-08-23	European Cup	Karlovy Vary (Carlsbad)	17
2010-05-30	African Cup	Larache	9
2010-08-15	European Cup	Geneva	DNF
2010-08-28	European Championships (U23)	Vila Nova de Gaia (Porto)	9
2010-09-08	Dextro Energy World Championship Series, Grand Final: U23 Championships	Budapest	23
2011-04-17	World Cup	Ishigaki	28
2011-07-09	Premium European Cup	Holten	6
2011-07-24	European Cup	Geneva	4
2011-08-14	World Cup	Tiszaújváros	38
