= Whitestein Technologies =

Swiss software company

Whitestein Technologies AG
- Company type: Private
- Industry: Computer software
- Founded: 1999; 27 years ago
- Headquarters: Cham, Switzerland
- Website: www.whitestein.com

Whitestein Technologies AG, abbreviated to Whitestein, is a Swiss information technology company headquartered in Steinhausen, Switzerland. The company produces licensed software products and associated services for financial services, logistics, telecommunications, and public sector organizations.

== History ==
Whitestein Technologies AG was incorporated as a Swiss Aktiengesellschaft in Zug, Switzerland in 1999. In the same year, the group acquired Aitecon s.r.o., renaming it to Whitestein Technologies s.r.o. In 2003, it acquired German software company Living Systems GmbH and renamed it to Whitestein Technologies GmbH.

The company presently operates from five locations: Zurich, Switzerland, Germany, Slovakia, Singapore, and the United States.

Whitestein Technologies develops and sells software products and services under the Living Systems trademark.

== Software ==
=== Living Systems Process Suite ===
It is business process management software with tools for modeling, execution, and optimization of goal-oriented business processes. The product includes support for the Goal-Oriented Business Process Modeling Notation (GO-BPMN), a visual modeling language for specification and direct execution of goal-oriented business processes based on the Business Process Modeling Notation (BPMN) standard.

=== Living Systems Adaptive Transportation Networks ===
A software application providing dynamic, real-time optimization and dispatching support for FTL (Full Truck Load), LTL (Less than Truck Load) and other transportation networks.
