= Steinhausen =

Steinhausen may refer to:

== Places ==
- Steinhausen an der Rottum, Baden-Württemberg, Germany
- Steinhausen, Namibia, former district capital of Okorukambe Constituency, Namibia
- Steinhausen, Switzerland, Canton Zug, Switzerland
  - Steinhausen railway station

== People ==
- Günther Steinhausen (1917-1942), German World War II Luftwaffe Flying ace
- Rolf Steinhausen (born 1943), German motorcycle racer
