= Steinhausen Rigiblick railway station =

Railway station in Switzerland

Steinhausen-Rigiblick
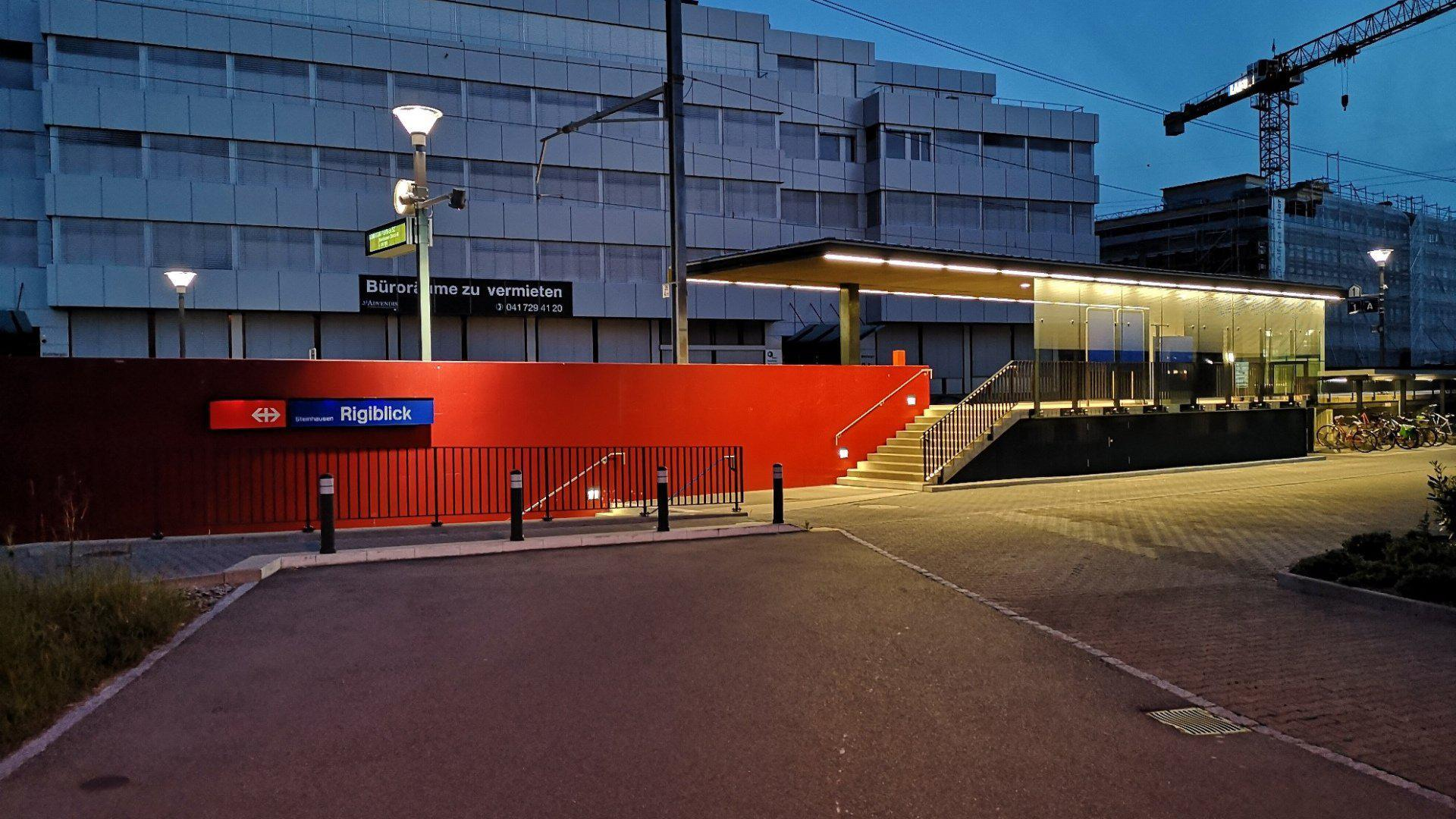
- The station in 2018

General information
- Location: Turmstrasse; Steinhausen, Zug; Switzerland
- Coordinates: 47°11′17″N 8°28′47″E
- Elevation: 416 m (1,365 ft)
- Owner: Swiss Federal Railways
- Operator: Swiss Federal Railways
- Line: Zurich–Affoltern am Albis–Zug
- Platforms: 1 side platform
- Tracks: 2

Other information
- Fare zone: 623 (Zug Fare Network)

History
- Opened: 26 November 2012

Services
Preceding station	Zurich S-Bahn	Following station
Zug Terminus	S5	Steinhausen towards Pfäffikon SZ
Location
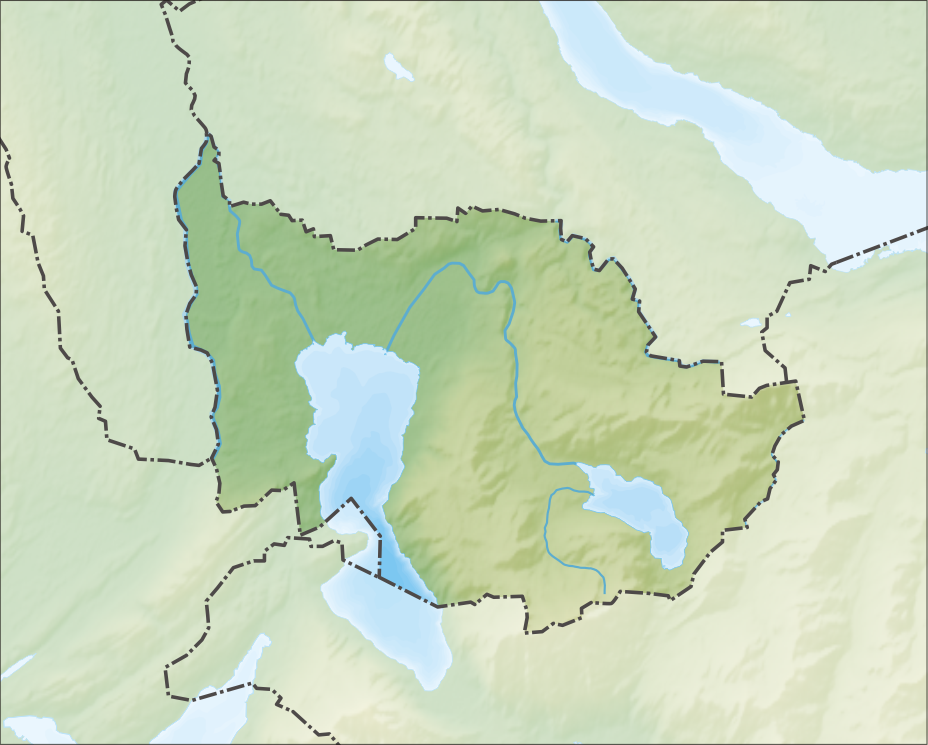
- Location within Switzerland Location within Canton of Zug

Steinhausen Rigiblick is a railway station in the Swiss canton of Zug, in the municipality of Steinhausen. It is located on the Zurich to Zug via Affoltern am Albis railway line, within fare zone 623 of the Zug Fare Network.

It is one of two railway stations in the municipality of Steinhausen, the other one being Steinhausen.

== History ==
It was inaugurated on 26 November 2012 and opened on the timetable change on 9 December 2012. The construction of the 320 m (1,050 ft) long station cost about SFr 10.5 million. In addition to the construction of the platform and the underpass, the track was adapted for the S41 service, preserving the remains of the Sumpfweiche (lit. 'swamp points' at the former direct connection with the line to Lucerne).

== Service ==
Steinhausen Rigiblick railway station is only served by regional S-Bahn trains. It is an intermediate stop on Zurich S-Bahn line S5, which runs between Zug and Pfäffikon, via Affoltern am Albis, Zurich and Uster.

- Zurich S-Bahn S5: half-hourly service to Zug, and to Pfäffikon SZ via Zürich HB and Rapperswil.

== See also ==
- Rail transport in Switzerland
