= Anaheim (disambiguation) =

Anaheim is a city in Orange County, California.

Anaheim may also refer to:

- Anaheim Hills
- Anaheim pepper
- Anaheim Regional Transportation Intermodal Center
- Anaheim Street station
- Anaheim, the codename of the Chromium-based Microsoft Edge web browser

== See also ==
- Annaheim (disambiguation)
