= Annaheim meteorite =

Meteorite found in Canada

Annaheim
- Type: Iron
- Structural classification: Medium octahedrite
- Group: IAB-sLL
- Country: Canada
- Region: Saskatchewan, Canada
- Coordinates: 52°24′00″N 104°51′00″W
- Observed fall: Yes
- Fall date: January 21, 1914 (?)
- Found date: July 30, 1916
- TKW: 13.4 kilograms (30 lb)

Annaheim is an iron meteorite recovered in 1916 in Canada.

== History ==
The meteorite was discovered by a farmer named William Huiras in his field while moving hay. It was linked to a fireball reported in the area in 1914.

== Classification ==
It is a medium octahedrite, IAB-sLL.

== Fragment ==
Measuring 30 centimetres (12 in) by 15 centimetres (5.9 in), it is now held by the Canadian Meteorite Collection, in Ottawa. The crescent-shaped fragment is covered in dimples as is typical with other iron meteorites.

== See also ==
- Glossary of meteoritics
