= Steinhaus =

Steinhaus may refer to:

== People ==
- Arthur H. Steinhaus, American physical fitness expert and sports physiologist
- Bibiana Steinhaus, German football referee
- Edward Arthur Steinhaus (1914–1969), American insect pathologist
- Helena Steinhaus (born 1987), German social activist and author
- Hugo Steinhaus, mathematician

== Places ==
- Steinhaus, Austria, a municipality in Upper Austria, Austria
- Steinhaus, Valais, a village incorporated in Ernen, Valais, Switzerland
