= Melanie Hauss =

Swiss professional triathlete

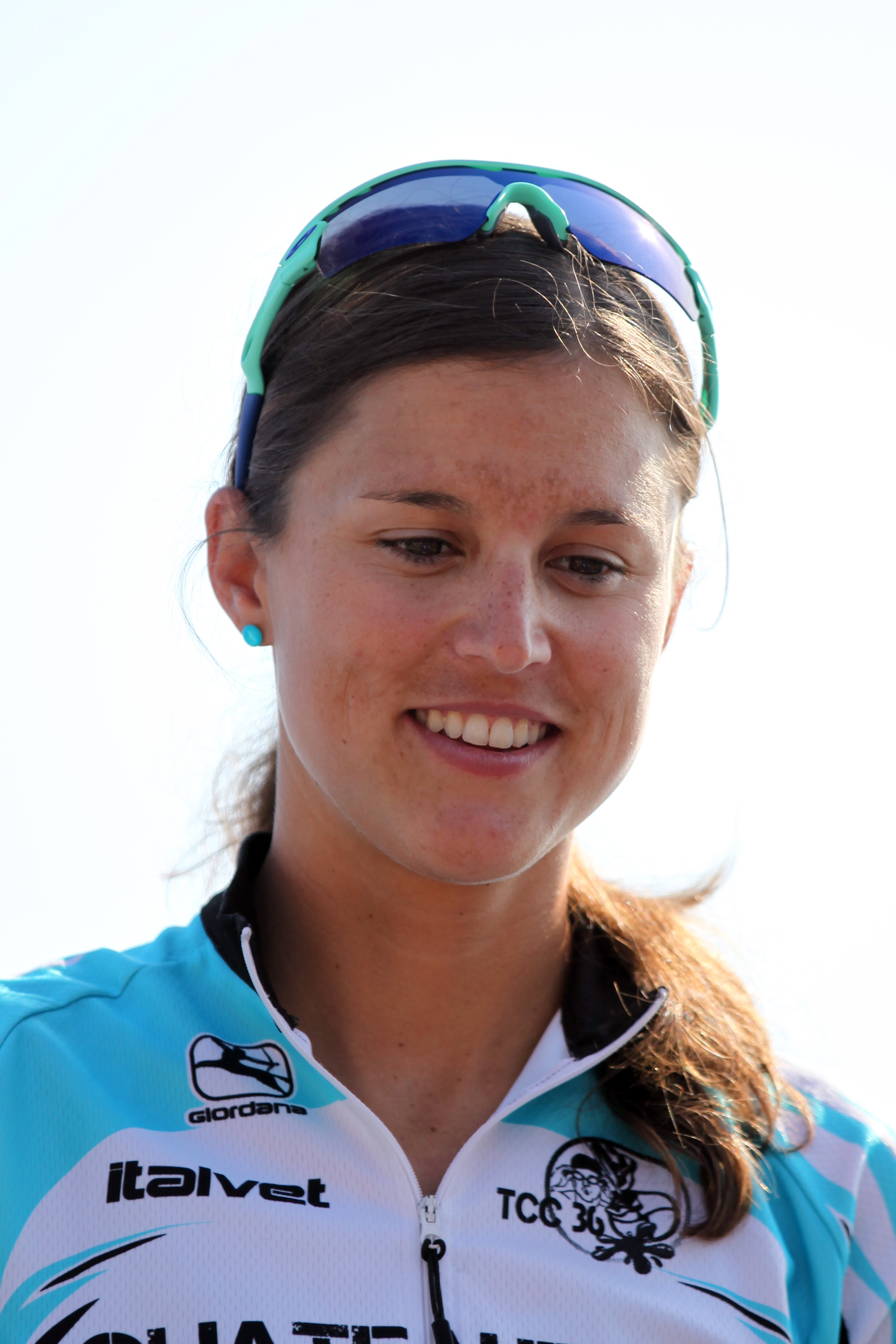
Melanie Annaheim with the bronze medal at the French Club Championship Series triathlon in Nice, 2010.

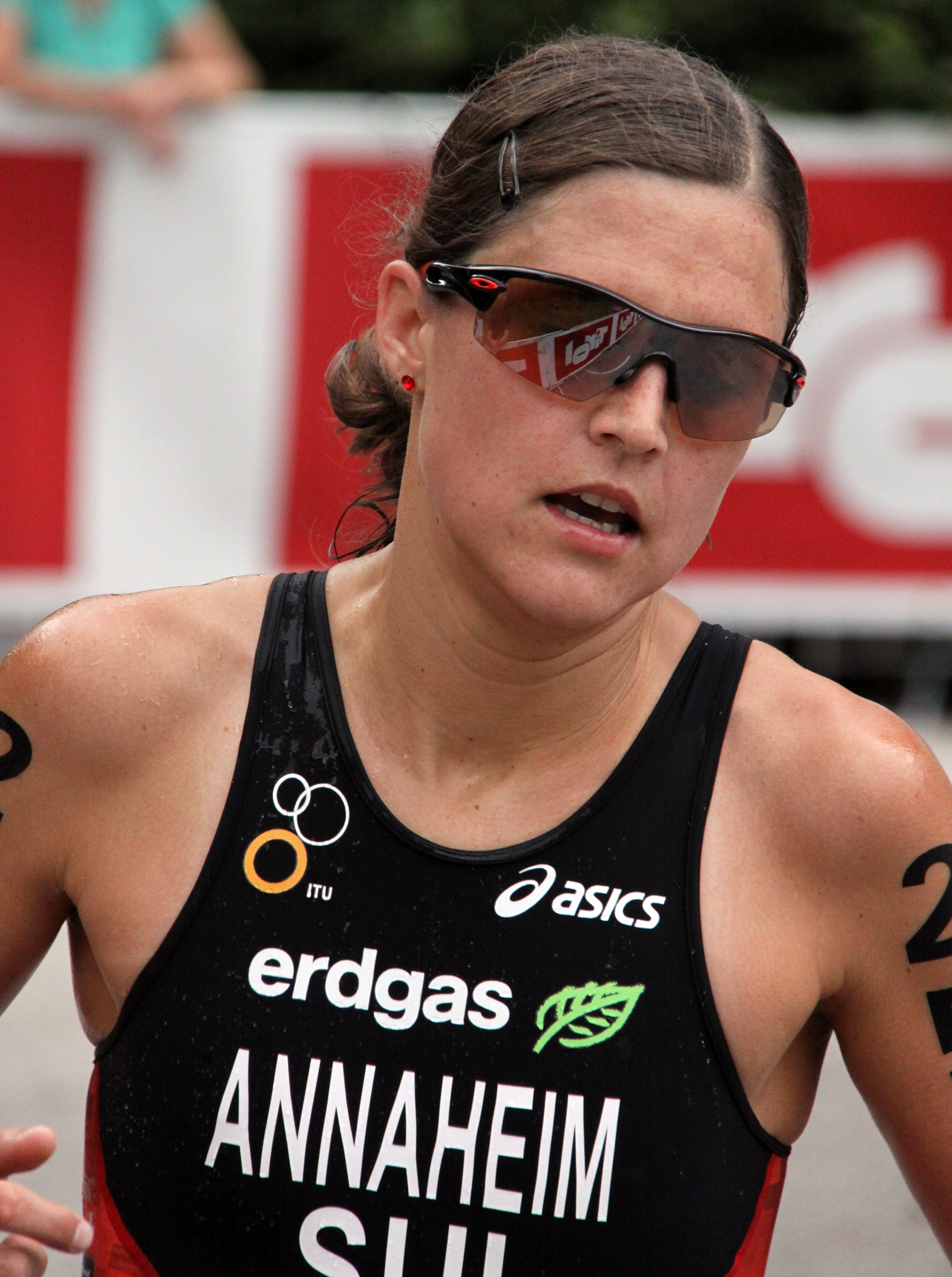
Melanie Annaheim placing 20th at the World Championship Series triathlon in Kitzbühel, 2010.

Melanie Hauss, née Annaheim (born 20 December 1982 in Lostorf) is a Swiss professional triathlete, member of the National Team (i.e. the Team London 2012) and bronze medalist of the 2009 Swiss Championships.

In France, together with Céline Schärer Melanie Annaheim takes part in the prestigious Club Championship Series Lyonnaise des Eaux and represents TCC 36 (Triathlon Club Châteauroux 36 (FRA)). At the first triathlon of the 2010 circuit in Dunkirk, for instance, she placed 18th and her club, which did not nominate any French triathletes at all, placed 2nd, with Magali Di Marco Messmer, Svenja Bazlen and Ricarda Lisk being the three athlètes classants l'équipe. At the Grand Final of the 2012 Grand Prix de Triathlon in Nice, Melanie Hauss placed 4th in the individual ranking, in the club ranking she won the bronze medal being the top athlete of TCC 36, which placed 4th in the Club Championship Series 2012.

In Switzerland, Annaheim represents Leichtathletik Club Regensdorf in the Canton of Zürich. By profession, she is a marketing assistant, she lives in Lostorf and is coached by Magali Di Marco Messmer. Her younger brother Matthias Annaheim is also a triathlete. In September 2012, Melanie Annaheim married the French triathlete David Hauss.

== ITU Competitions ==
In the nine years from 2004 to 2012, Melanie Hauss took part in 63 ITU competitions and achieved 17 top ten positions.

The following list is based upon the official ITU rankings and the Athlete's Profile Page. Unless indicated otherwise, the following events are triathlons (Olympic Distance) and belong to the Elite category.

Date	Competition	Place	Rank
2004-05-30	Duathlon World Championships (U23)	Geel	5
2005-07-17	European Championships (U23)	Sofia	8
2005-07-31	World Cup	Salford	23
2005-09-10	World Championships (U23)	Gamagori	14
2006-05-21	Premium European Cup	Sanremo	DNS
2007-03-25	BG World Cup	Mooloolaba	59
2007-04-15	BG World Cup	Ishigaki	53
2007-05-06	BG World Cup	Lisbon	DNF
2007-05-20	European Cup and Small States of Europe Championships	Limassol	DNS
2007-07-07	Premium European Cup	Holten	16
2007-07-22	BG World Cup	Kitzbuhel	51
2007-08-11	BG World Cup	Tiszaújváros	36
2007-08-19	European Cup	Geneva	5
2007-09-09	Premium European Cup	Kedzierzyn Kozle	8
2007-10-07	BG World Cup	Rhodes	25
2007-10-24	Premium European Cup	Alanya	10
2007-11-04	BG World Cup	Cancun	28
2008-03-14	Pan American Cup	Salinas	6
2008-04-19	Premium European Cup	Pontevedra	2
2008-05-04	BG World Cup	Richards Bay	30
2008-05-10	European Championships	Lisbon	31
2008-05-25	BG World Cup	Madrid	DNF
2008-06-05	BG World Championships	Vancouver	51
2008-07-05	BG World Cup	Hamburg	11
2008-07-20	BG World Cup	Kitzbuhel	18
2008-09-13	European Cup	Vienna	20
2009-04-26	World Cup	Ishigaki	7
2009-05-02	Dextro Energy World Championship Series	Tongyeong	DNF
2009-05-31	Dextro Energy World Championship Series	Madrid	21
2009-07-02	European Championships	Holten	7
2009-07-11	Dextro Energy World Championship Series	Kitzbuhel	22
2009-07-25	Dextro Energy World Championship Series	Hamburg	8
2009-08-15	Dextro Energy World Championship Series	London	18
2009-09-09	Dextro Energy World Championship Series, Grand Final	Gold Coast	34
2010-04-11	Dextro Energy World Championship Series	Sydney	DNF
2010-06-05	Dextro Energy World Championship Series	Madrid	22
2010-07-03	European Championships	Athlone	17
2010-07-17	Dextro Energy World Championship Series	Hamburg	14
2010-07-24	Dextro Energy World Championship Series	London	28
2010-08-15	Dextro Energy World Championship Series	Kitzbuhel	20
2010-08-21	World Championships (Sprint)	Lausanne	18
2010-09-08	Dextro Energy World Championship Series, Grand Final	Budapest	25
2010-10-10	World Cup	Huatulco	6
2010-12-18	African Cup	Mauritius	1
2011-03-26	World Cup	Mooloolaba	24
2011-04-09	Dextro Energy World Championship Series	Sydney	27
2011-06-04	Dextro Energy World Championship Series	Madrid	20
2011-06-18	Dextro Energy World Championship Series	Kitzbuhel	16
2011-06-24	European Championships	Pontevedra	DNF
2011-07-16	Dextro Energy World Championship Series	Hamburg	14
2011-08-06	Dextro Energy World Championship Series	London	31
2011-08-20	Sprint World Championships	Lausanne	21
2011-08-21	Sprint World Championships (Mixed Relay)	Lausanne	2
2011-09-09	Dextro Energy World Championship Series, Grand Final	Beijing	3
2012-03-24	World Cup	Mooloolaba	22
2012-04-14	World Triathlon Series	Sydney	DNF
2012-04-22	World Cup	Ishigaki	15
2012-05-10	World Triathlon Series	San Diego	33
2012-05-26	World Triathlon Series	Madrid	22
2012-06-23	World Triathlon Series	Kitzbuhel	18
2012-07-21	World Triathlon Series	Hamburg	DNF
2012-08-25	World Triathlon Series	Stockholm	15
2012-08-25	World Triathlon Series (Mixed Relay)	Stockholm	5

BG = the sponsor British Gas · DNF = did not finish · DNS = did not start

== Gallery ==
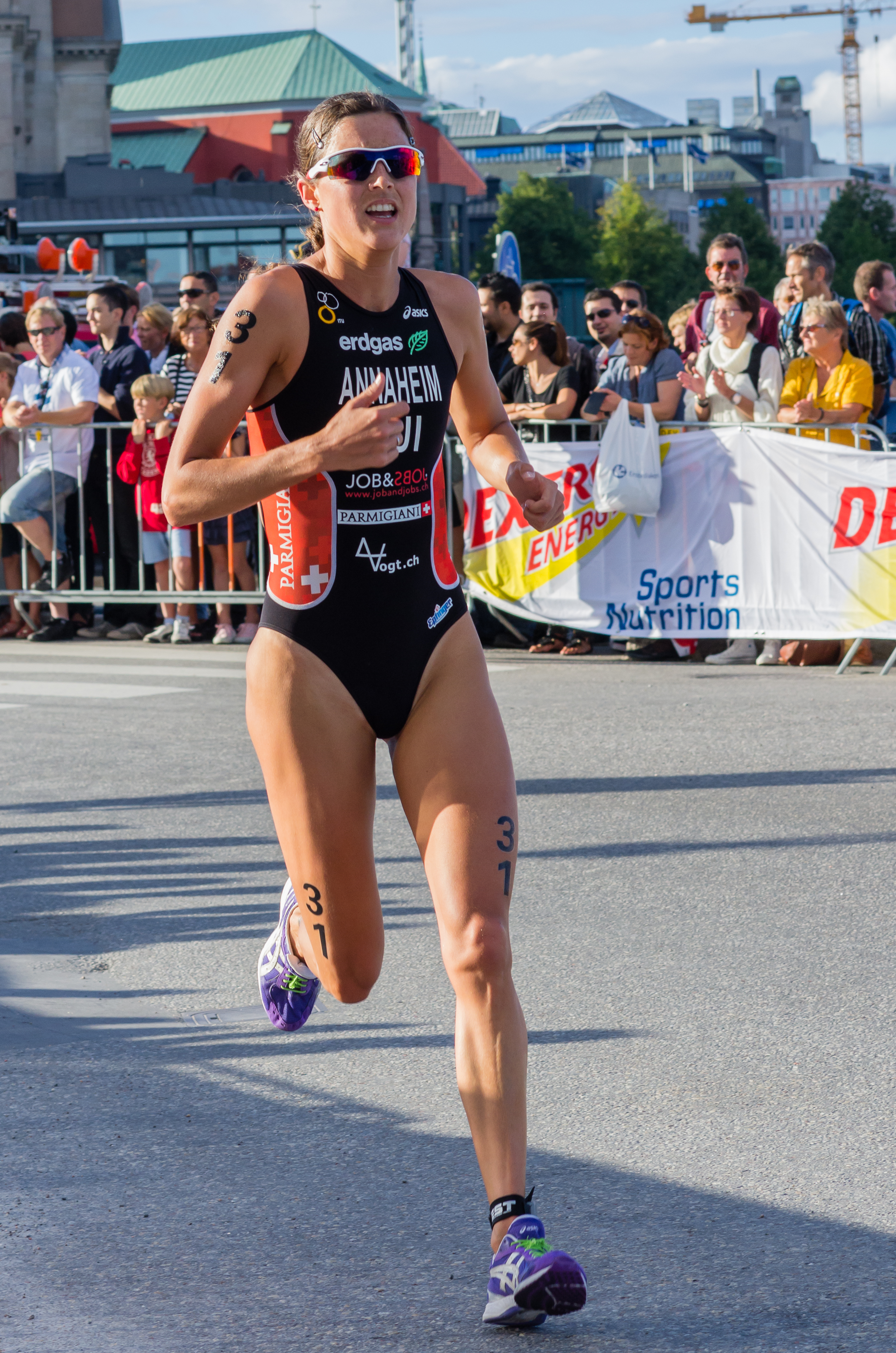
Melanie Annaheim competing in Stockholm World Championship event, 25 August 2012
