= Steinhausen railway station =

Railway station in Switzerland

Steinhausen
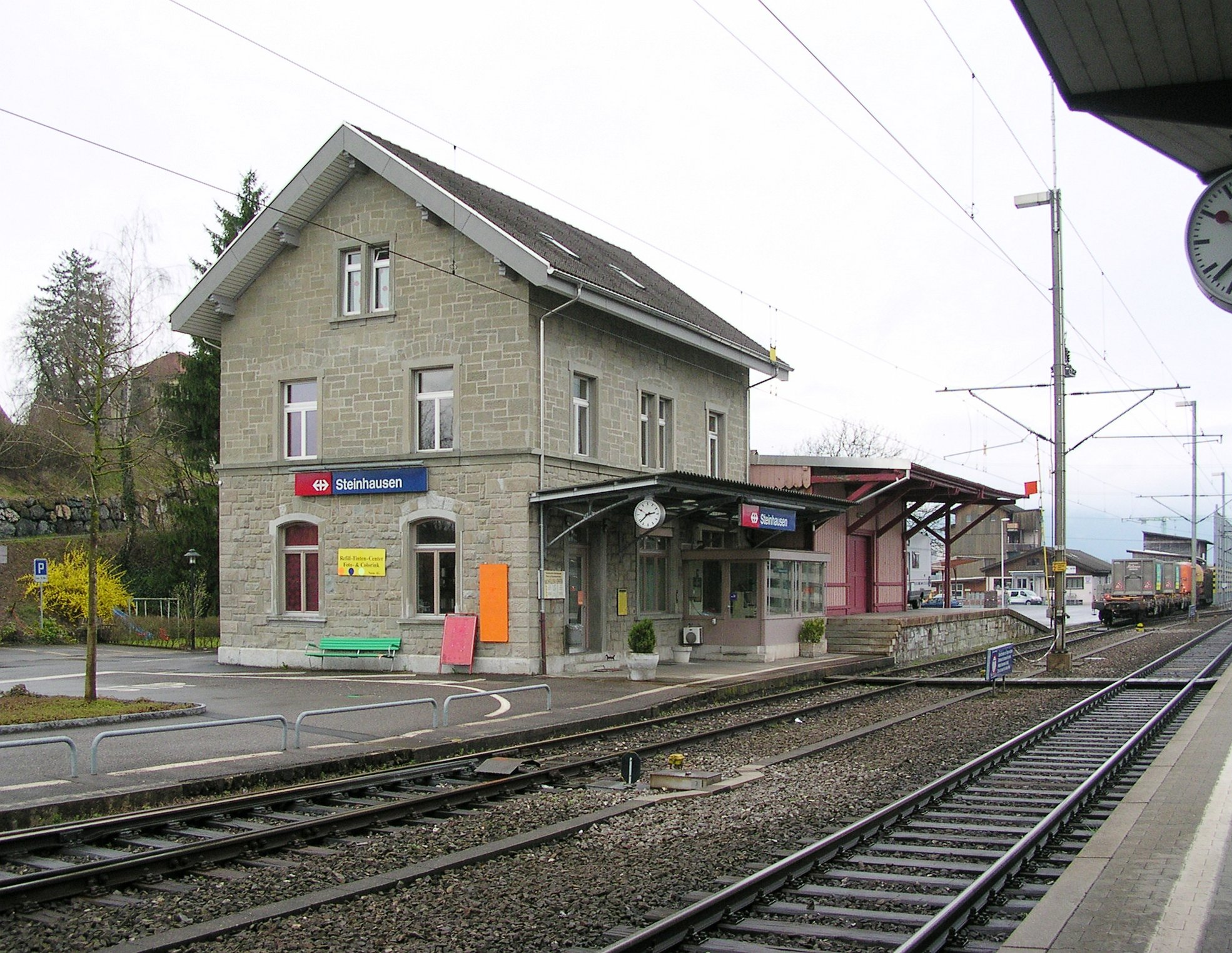

General information
- Location: Beim Bahnhof; Steinhausen, Zug; Switzerland
- Coordinates: 47.194459°N 8.478184°E
- Elevation: 424 m (1,391 ft)
- Owner: Swiss Federal Railways
- Operator: Swiss Federal Railways
- Line: Zurich–Affoltern am Albis–Zug
- Platforms: 1 island platform
- Tracks: 3
- Connections: Hinterberg/Bahnhof: Zugerland Verkehrsbetriebe bus lines 606 and 616 Bahnhof: Zugerland Verkehrsbetriebe bus line 636

Other information
- Fare zone: 623 (Zug Fare Network)

History
- Opened: 1904

Services
Preceding station	Zurich S-Bahn	Following station
Steinhausen Rigiblick towards Zug	S5	Knonau towards Pfäffikon SZ
Location
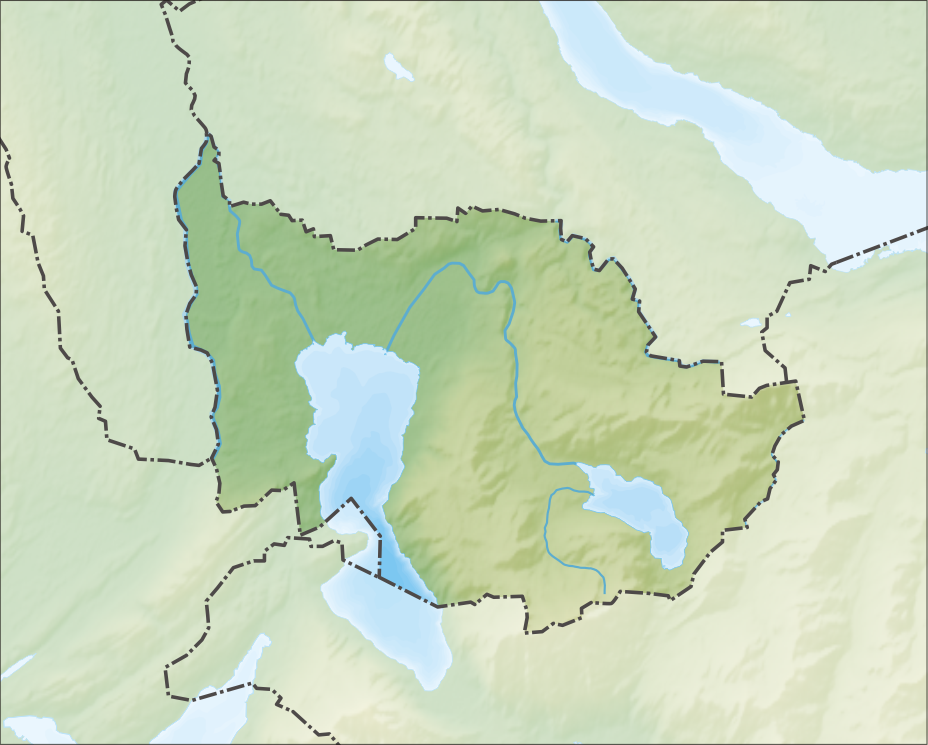
- Location within Switzerland Location within Canton of Zug

Steinhausen is a railway station in the Swiss canton of Zug, situated in the municipality of Steinhausen. The station is located on the Zurich to Zug via Affoltern am Albis railway line, within fare zone 623 of the Zug Fare Network.

It is one of two railway stations in the municipality of Steinhausen, the other one being Steinhausen Rigiblick.

== Service ==
Steinhausen railway station is only served by regional S-Bahn trains. It is an intermediate stop on Zurich S-Bahn line S5, which runs between Zug and Pfäffikon, via Affoltern am Albis, Zurich and Uster. In summary:

- Zurich S-Bahn S5: half-hourly service to Zug, and to Pfäffikon SZ via Zürich HB.

== See also ==
- Rail transport in Switzerland
