= Steinhausen, Switzerland =

Steinhausen
- Municipality
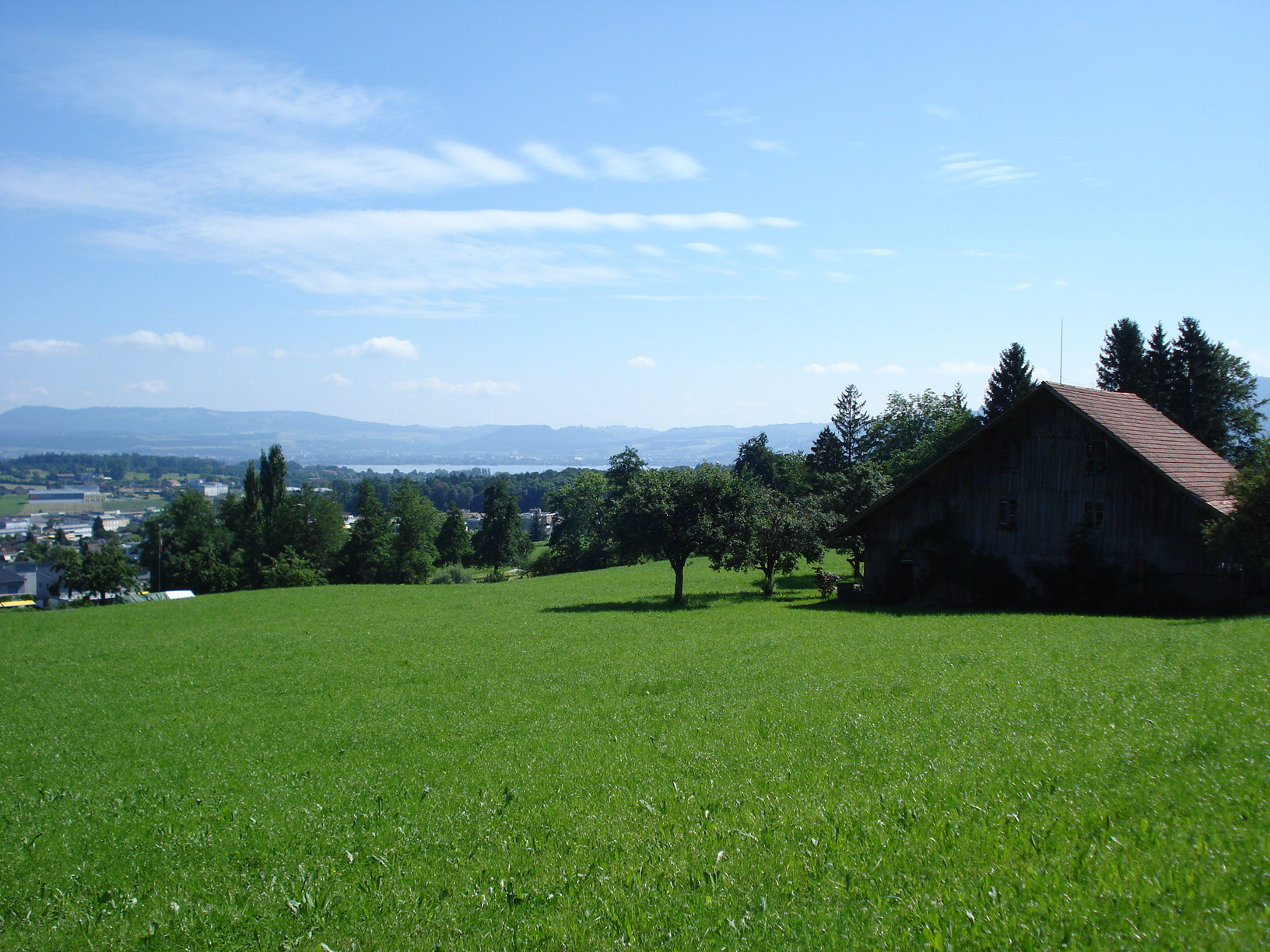

- Flag Coat of arms
- Location of Steinhausen
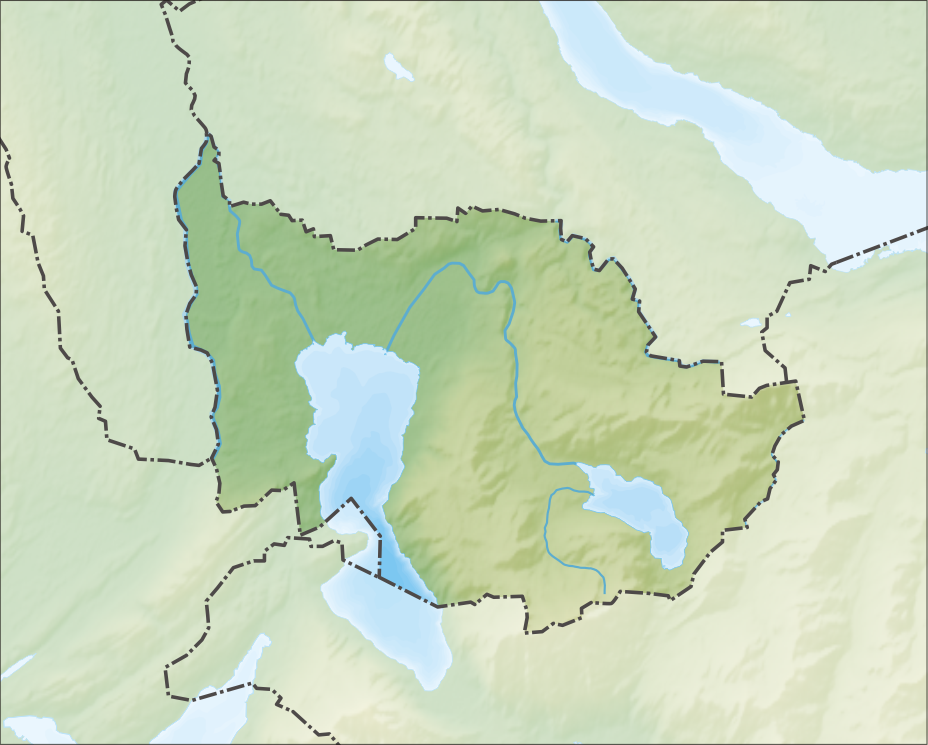
- Location within Switzerland Location within Canton of Zug
- Coordinates: 47°12′N 8°29′E
- Country: Switzerland
- Canton: Zug
- District: n.a.

Area
  - Total: 5.10 km^{2} (1.97 sq mi)
- Elevation: 427 m (1,401 ft)

Population (December 2020)
  - Total: 10,198
  - Density: 2,000/km^{2} (5,180/sq mi)
- Time zone: UTC+01:00 (CET)
  - Summer (DST): UTC+02:00 (CEST)
- Postal code: 6312
- SFOS number: 1708
- ISO 3166 code: CH-ZG
- Surrounded by: Baar, Cham, Kappel am Albis (ZH), Knonau (ZH), Zug
- Website: steinhausen.ch

Steinhausen is a municipality and a town in the canton of Zug in Switzerland.

== History ==
Steinhausen is first mentioned in 1173 as Steinhusin.

== Geography ==
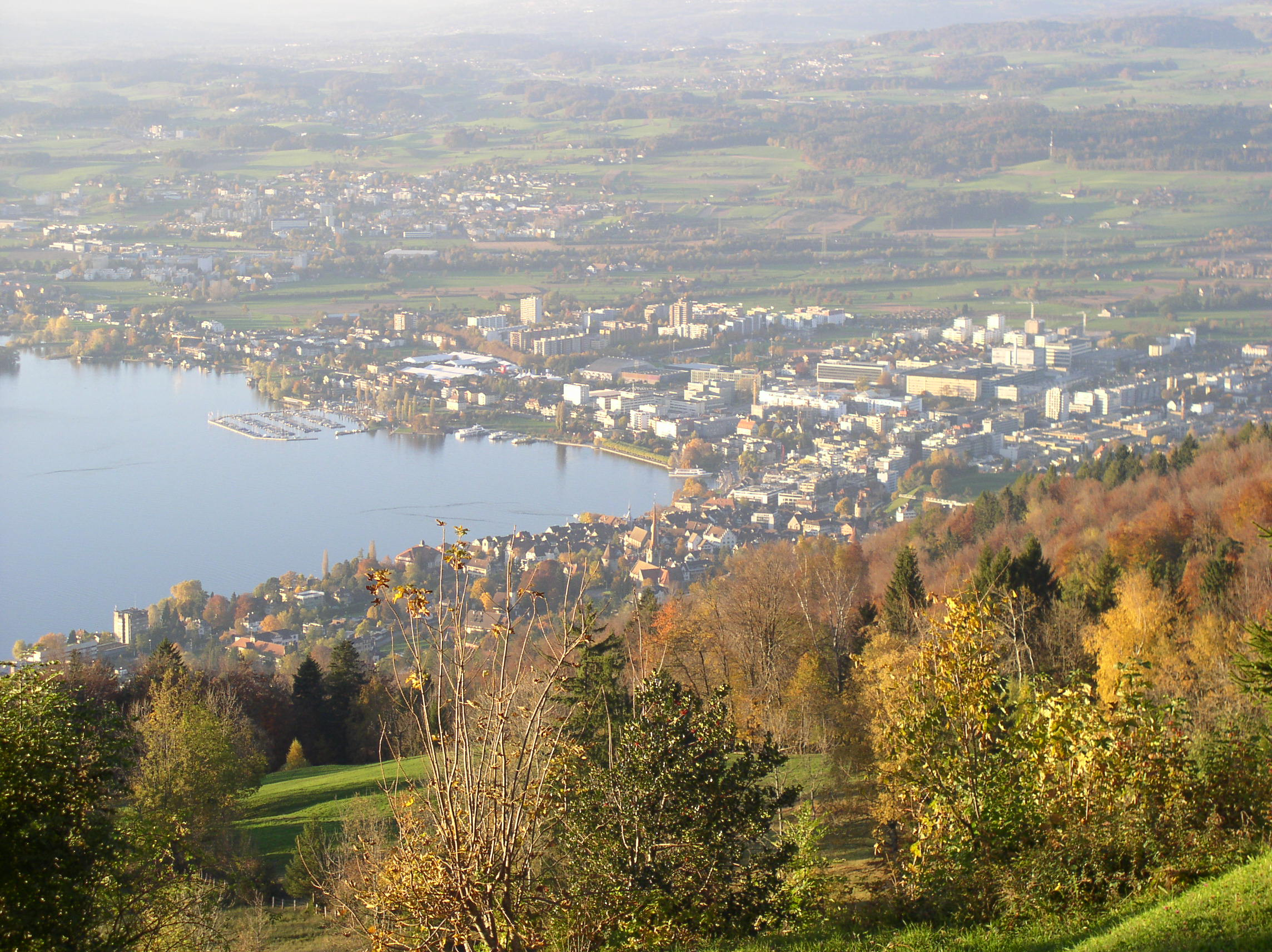
View from the Zugerberg over Zug, with Steinhausen in the background

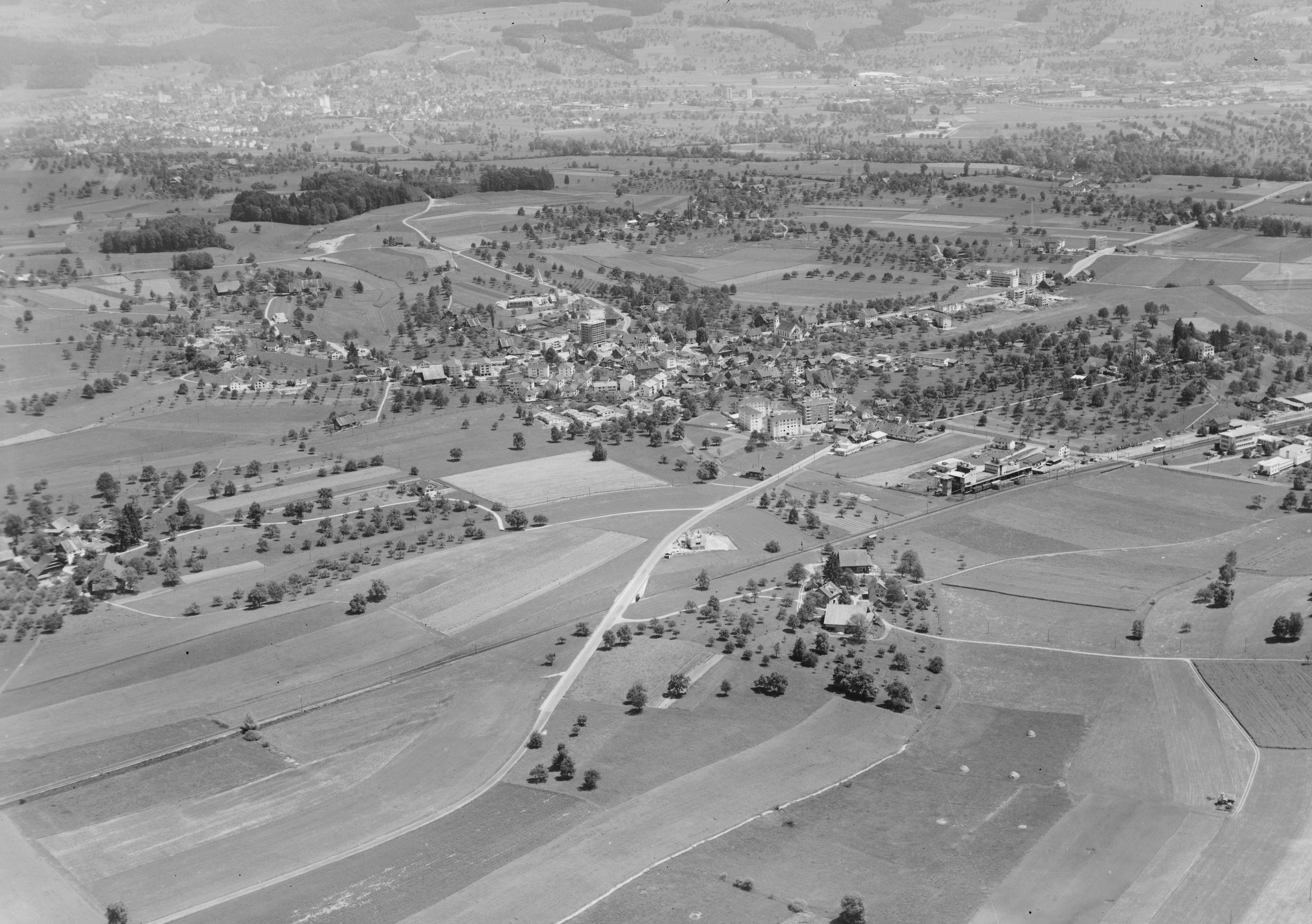
Aerial view (1965)

Steinhausen has an area, as of 2006, of 5 km^{2} (1.9 sq mi). Of this area, 50.5% is used for agricultural purposes, while 15.1% is forested. Of the rest of the land, 33.2% is settled (buildings or roads) and the remainder (1.2%) is non-productive (rivers, glaciers or mountains).

The municipality is located on the north-west edge of the Lorze river flood plain. It consists of the village of Steinhausen and the hamlets of Bann and Erli.

== Demographics ==
Steinhausen has a population (as of 31 December 2020) of 10,198. As of 2007, 19.3% of the population was made up of foreign nationals. Over the last 10 years the population has grown at a rate of 8.6%. Most of the population (as of 2000) speaks German (86.2%), with Serbo-Croatian being second most common ( 3.4%) and Italian being third ( 2.8%).

In the 2007 federal election the most popular party was the SVP which received 28.7% of the vote. The next three most popular parties were the CVP (22.7%), the FDP (19.7%) and the Green Party (19.5%).

In Steinhausen about 78.5% of the population (between age 25–64) have completed either non-mandatory upper secondary education or additional higher education (either university or a Fachhochschule).

Steinhausen has an unemployment rate of 1.77%. As of 2005, there were 77 people employed in the primary economic sector and about 27 businesses involved in this sector. 2,185 people are employed in the secondary sector and there are 102 businesses in this sector. 3,078 people are employed in the tertiary sector, with 431 businesses in this sector.

The historical population is given in the following table:

year	population
1771	389
1850	490
1900	443
1910	470
1950	1,078
1970	4,138
1990	7,207
2000	8,801

== Transport ==
Steinhausen railway station is a stop of the Zürich S-Bahn on the line S5. It is a 43-minute ride from Zürich Hauptbahnhof. Another station, Steinhausen Rigiblick railway station was opened in 2012.

== Notable people ==
- Max Huwyler (born 1931) is a Swiss writer, lives in Steinhausen
- Josef Bisig (born 1952 in Steinhausen) a Swiss Roman Catholic priest, and co-founder and first superior general of the Priestly Fraternity of Saint Peter
- Céline Schärer (born 1990) is a professional Swiss triathlete, lives in Steinhausen
- Nina Betschart (born 1995 in Steinhausen) a Swiss professional beach volleyball player

== Economy ==
The headquarters of now defunct Crypto AG was located in Steinhausen.
