= Ricarda Lisk =

German triathlete (born 1981)

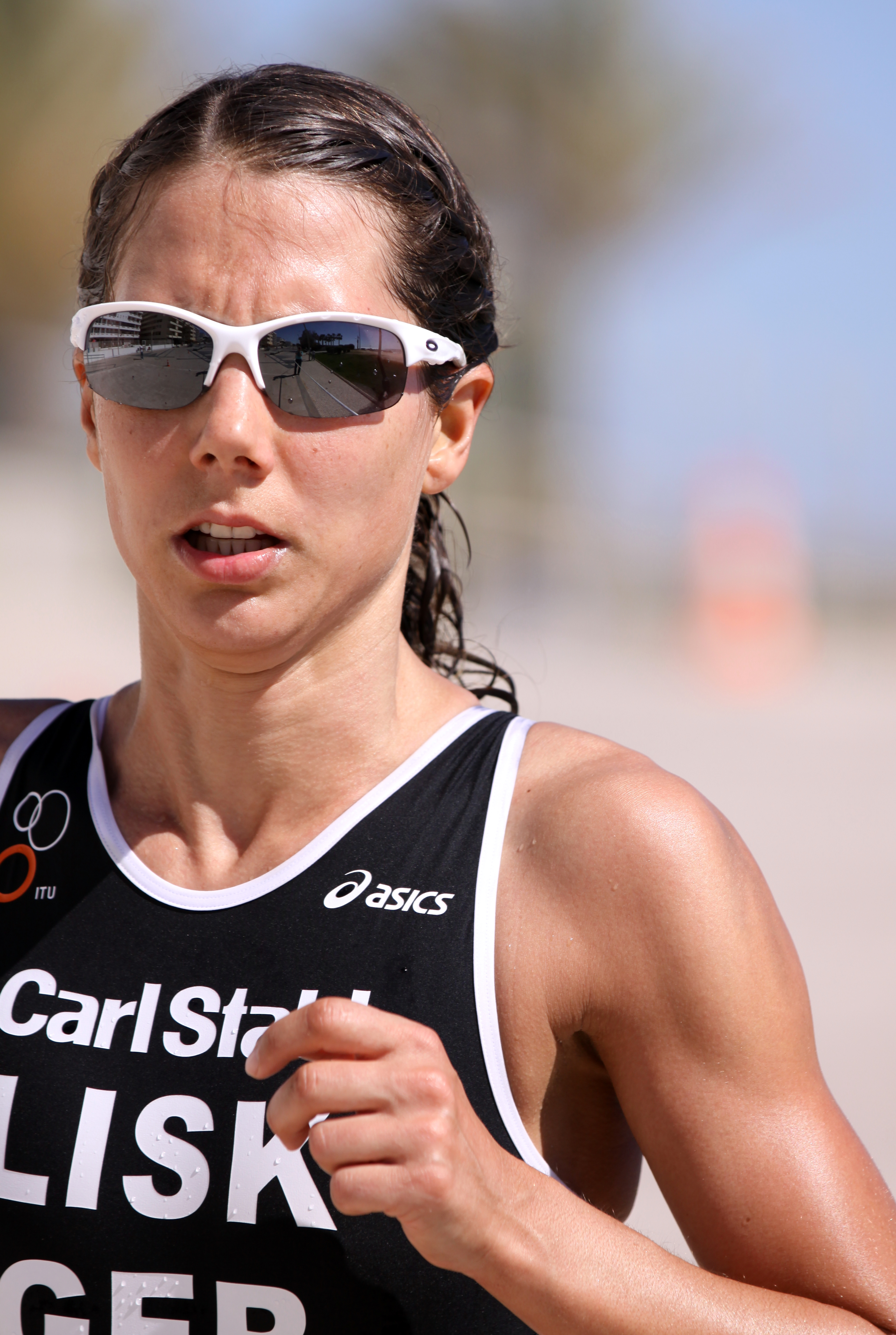
Ricarda Lisk at the European Cup triathlon in Quarteira, 2011.

Ricarda Lisk (born 1 February 1981 in Schorndorf, Baden-Württemberg), is a German professional triathlete, National Elite Champion of the year 2010, and a permanent member of the German Kader, i.e. the National Team.

National Junior Champion of the year 1999 and National U23 Champion of the year 2004, Lisk placed 15th at the Olympic Games in Beijing (2008), just a few seconds behind the 2004 gold medalist Kate Allen, thus proving to be the best female triathlete in the German team.

== Biography ==
In Germany, Ricarda Lisk has represented the club VfL Waiblingen since 1992. She is part of the Olympic Project 2012 at the high performance centre in Saarbrücken. Up to 2005, Ricarda Lisk was also part of the military elite team (Bundeswehr-Sportfördergruppe) based in Saarbrücken and as a sergeant, Stabsunteroffizier, she won silver (women individual senior ranking) at two World Military Triathlon Championships (Belfort: 4–8 June 2004, Ventura: 22–26 June 2005).

Ricarda Lisk holds a degree in sports management (2004). At present she studies business administration at the Fernuniversität Hagen.

Lisk lives in Waiblingen, Saarbrücken, Pontevedra and, in winter, in Stellenbosch. The Spanish triathlete Javier Gomez and Ricarda Lisk are a couple and, representing the Galician club Cidade de Lugo Fluvial, both attend triathlons in Spain as well. E.g. they won the Triatlón de Aguilas on 30 May 2010.

== French Club Championship Series ==
Since 2006, Ricarda Lisk has represented Tri Club Châteauroux 36 in the prestigious French Club Championship Series Grand Prix de Triathlon. This club relies exclusively on its foreign guest stars. In 2010, Lisk placed 14th, 5th and 6th at Dunkirk (23 May 2010), Beauvais (13 June 2010) and Tourangeaux (29 August 2010). Thus she was always among the three triathlètes classants l'équipe.

== ITU Competitions ==
In the twelve years from 1999 to 2010, Ricarda Lisk took part in 67 ITU competitions and achieved 24 top ten positions, among which four gold medals. The following list is based upon the official ITU rankings and the Athlete's Profile Page.

Date	Competition	Place	Rank
1999-07-03	European Championships (Junior)	Funchal	20
2000-07-08	European Championships (Junior)	Stein	9
2001-06-23	European Championships (Junior)	Carlsbad	3
2001-07-22	World Championships (Junior)	Edmonton	4
2002-06-02	European Cup	Zundert	32
2002-07-06	European Championships	Győr	21
2002-07-28	World Cup	Tiszaújváros	21
2002-09-07	World Cup	Hamburg	9
2002-09-21	World Cup	Nice	26
2002-11-09	World Championships (U23)	Cancun	6
2003-04-26	World Cup	St Anthonys	24
2003-06-21	European Championships	Carlsbad	DNF
2003-08-03	World Cup	Tiszaújváros	31
2003-09-06	World Cup	Hamburg	27
2003-09-21	World Cup	Madrid	35
2003-10-19	World Cup	Madeira	14
2003-10-25	World Cup	Athens	22
2003-12-06	World Championships (U23)	Queenstown	10
2004-05-09	World Championships	Madeira	38
2004-07-03	European Cup	Holten	1
2004-07-25	World Cup	Salford	12
2004-09-26	World Cup	Gamagori	DNF
2005-06-05	World Cup	Madrid	15
2005-07-16	Premium European Cup	Holten	10
2005-07-31	World Cup	Salford	21
2005-08-06	World Cup	Hamburg	23
2005-08-20	European Championships	Lausanne	19
2005-10-26	Premium European Cup	Alanya	3
2005-11-13	World Cup	New Plymouth	24
2006-03-03	World Cup	Doha	10
2006-03-10	World Cup	Aqaba	4
2006-03-26	World Cup	Mooloolaba	14
2006-05-07	World Cup	Mazatlan	DNS
2006-07-30	BG World Cup	Salford	10
2006-08-13	BG World Cup	Tiszaújváros	12
2006-09-02	World Championships	Lausanne	38
2006-09-09	BG World Cup	Hamburg	7
2006-10-28	Premium European Cup	Eilat	1
2006-11-05	BG World Cup	Cancun	8
2006-11-12	BG World Cup	New Plymouth	30
2007-03-03	African Cup	Langebaan	1
2007-03-25	BG World Cup	Mooloolaba	5
2007-05-06	BG World Cup	Lisbon	11
2007-06-03	BG World Cup	Madrid	DNF
2007-06-29	European Championships	Copenhagen	5
2007-07-29	BG World Cup	Salford	21
2007-08-30	BG World Championships	Hamburg	5
2007-09-15	BG World Cup	Beijing	16
2007-10-07	BG World Cup	Rhodes	8
2008-02-23	African Cup	Bloemfontein	1
2008-04-26	BG World Cup	Tongyeong	11
2008-05-04	BG World Cup (Elite)	Richards Bay	5
2008-05-25	BG World Cup	Madrid	13
2008-07-05	BG World Cup	Hamburg	1
2008-08-18	Olympic Games	Beijing	15
2009-05-02	Dextro Energy World Championship Series	Tongyeong	26
2009-05-31	Dextro Energy World Championship Series	Madrid	26
2009-07-11	Dextro Energy World Championship Series	Kitzbühel	11
2009-07-25	Dextro Energy World Championship Series	Hamburg	18
2009-08-15	Dextro Energy World Championship Series	London	7
2009-08-22	Dextro Energy World Championship Series	Yokohama	11
2009-09-09	Dextro Energy World Championship Series, Grand Final	Gold Coast	11
2010-03-27	World Cup	Mooloolaba	11
2010-04-11	Dextro Energy World Championship Series	Sydney	DNF
2010-05-08	Dextro Energy World Championship Series	Seoul	33
2010-06-05	Dextro Energy World Championship Series	Madrid	24
2010-07-17	Dextro Energy World Championship Series	Hamburg	15
2010-07-24	Dextro Energy World Championship Series	London	DNF
2010-08-15	Dextro Energy World Championship Series	Kitzbuhel	24
2010-09-08	Dextro Energy World Championship Series, Grand Final	Budapest	18
2010-10-10	World Cup	Huatulco	17
2010-10-10	European Cup	Quarteira	5

BG = the sponsor British Gas · DNF = did not finish · DNS = did not start

== Gallery ==
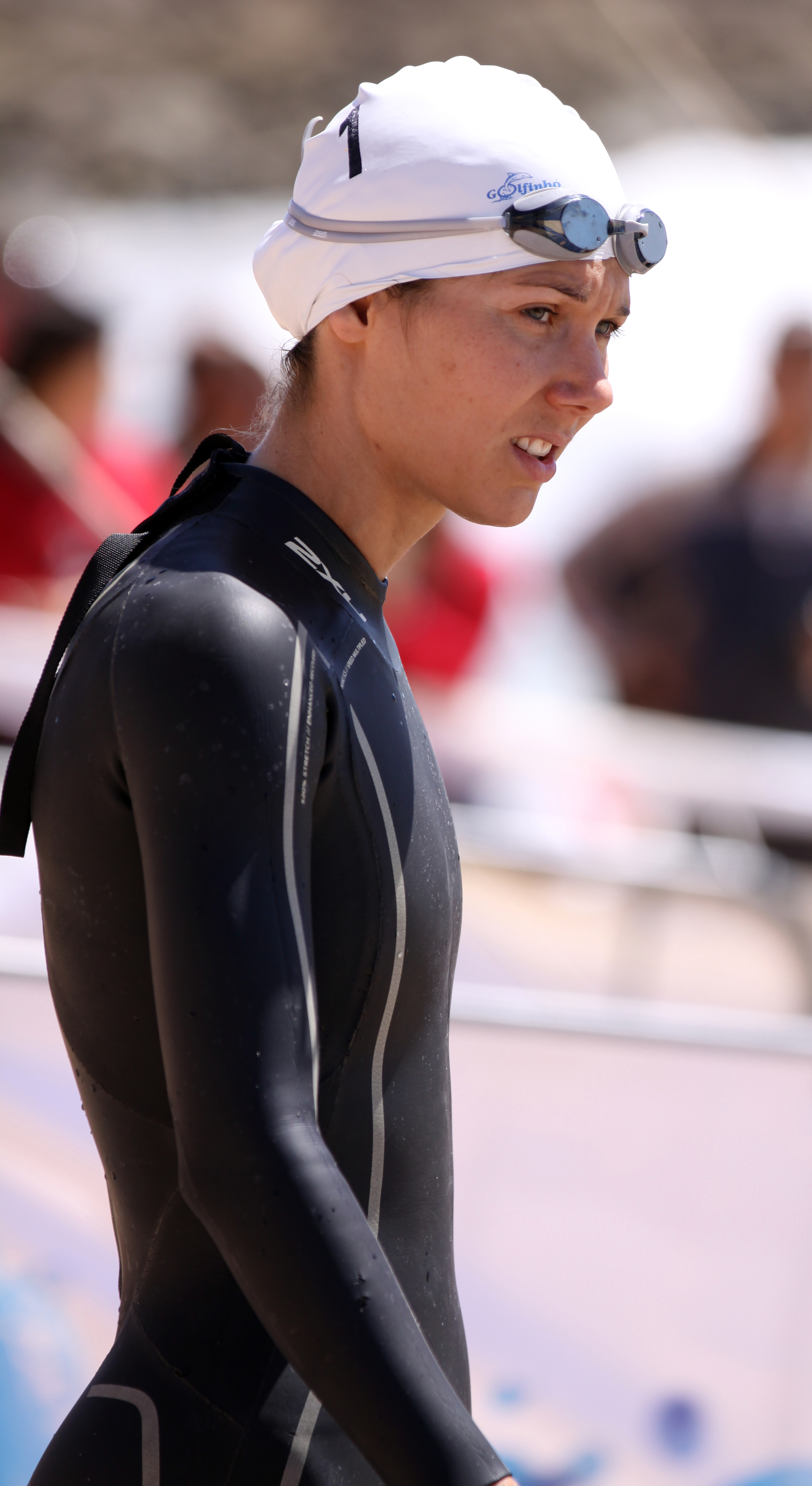
Ricarda Lisk at the European Cup triathlon in Quarteira, 2011.

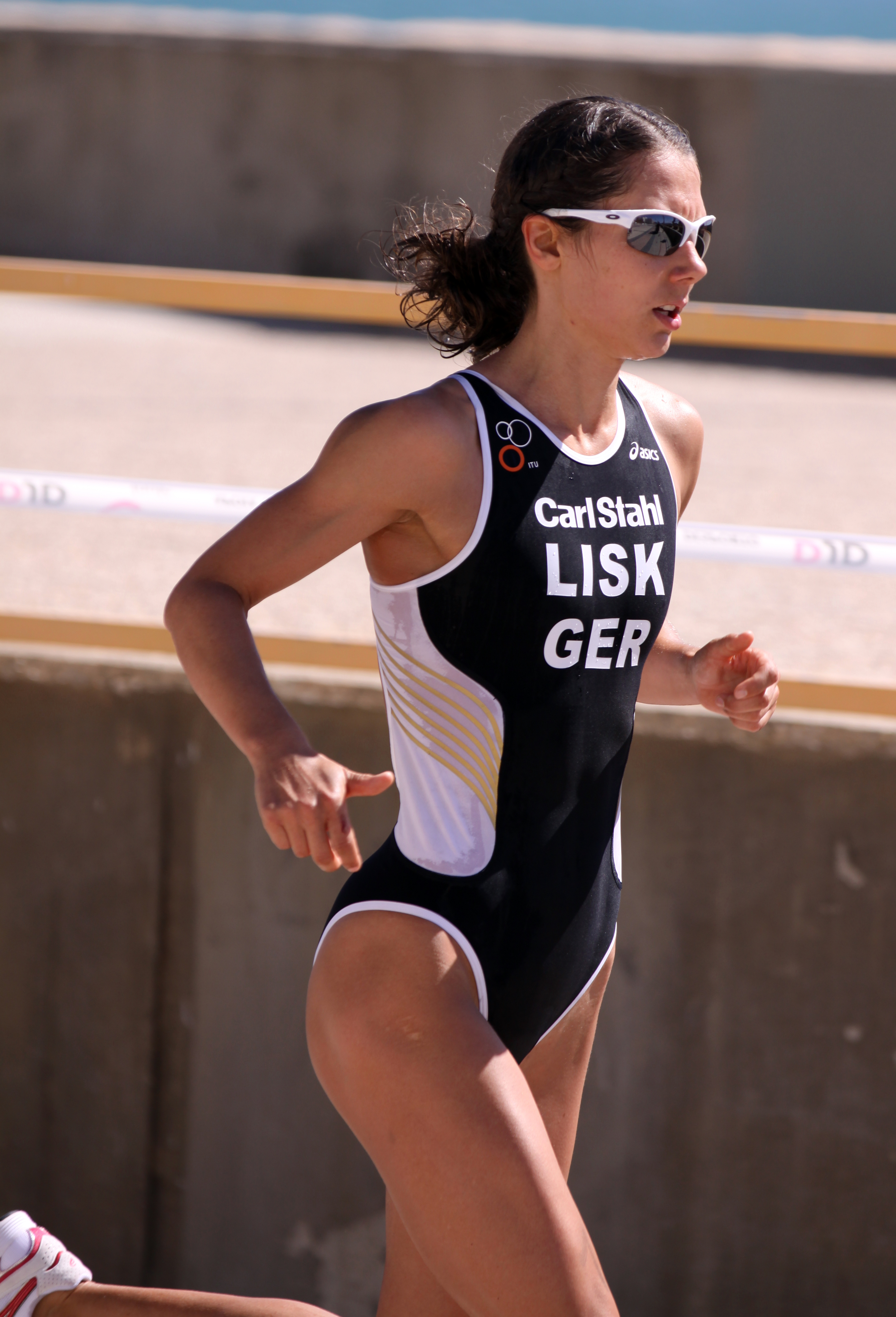
Ricarda Lisk at the European Cup triathlon in Quarteira, 2011.

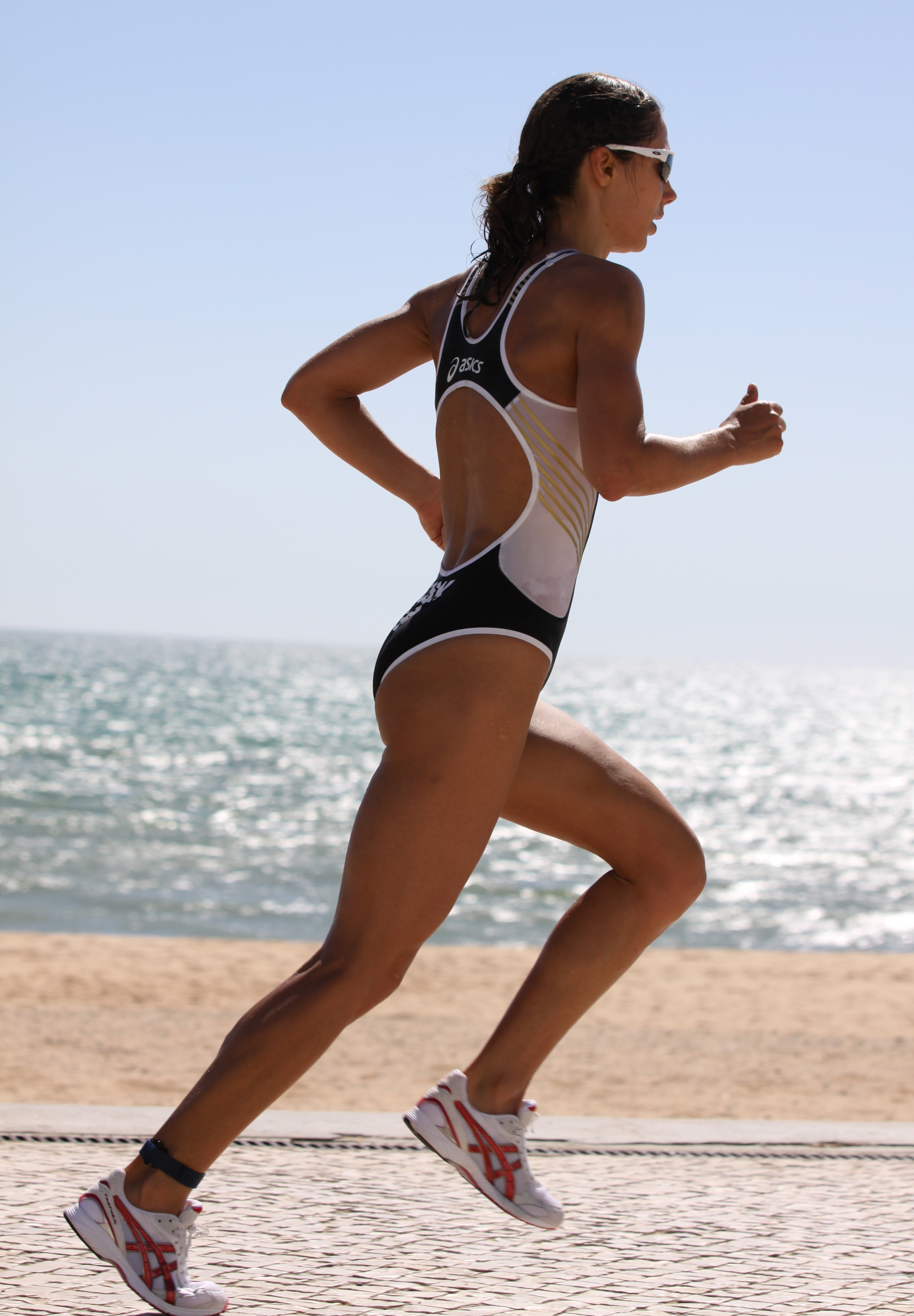
Ricarda Lisk at the European Cup triathlon in Quarteira, 2011.

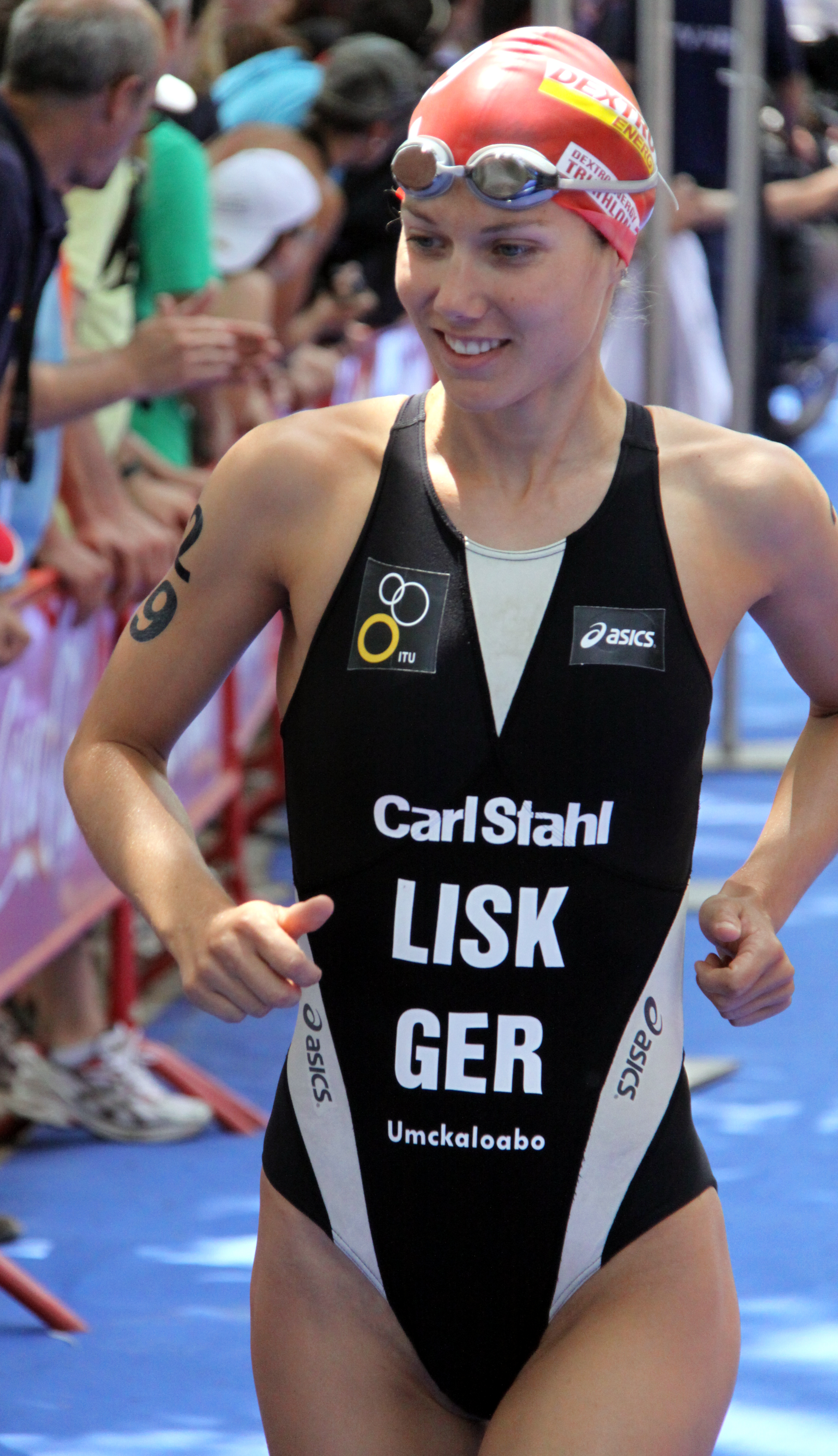
Ricarda Lisk at the World Championship Series triathlon in Madrid, 2010.

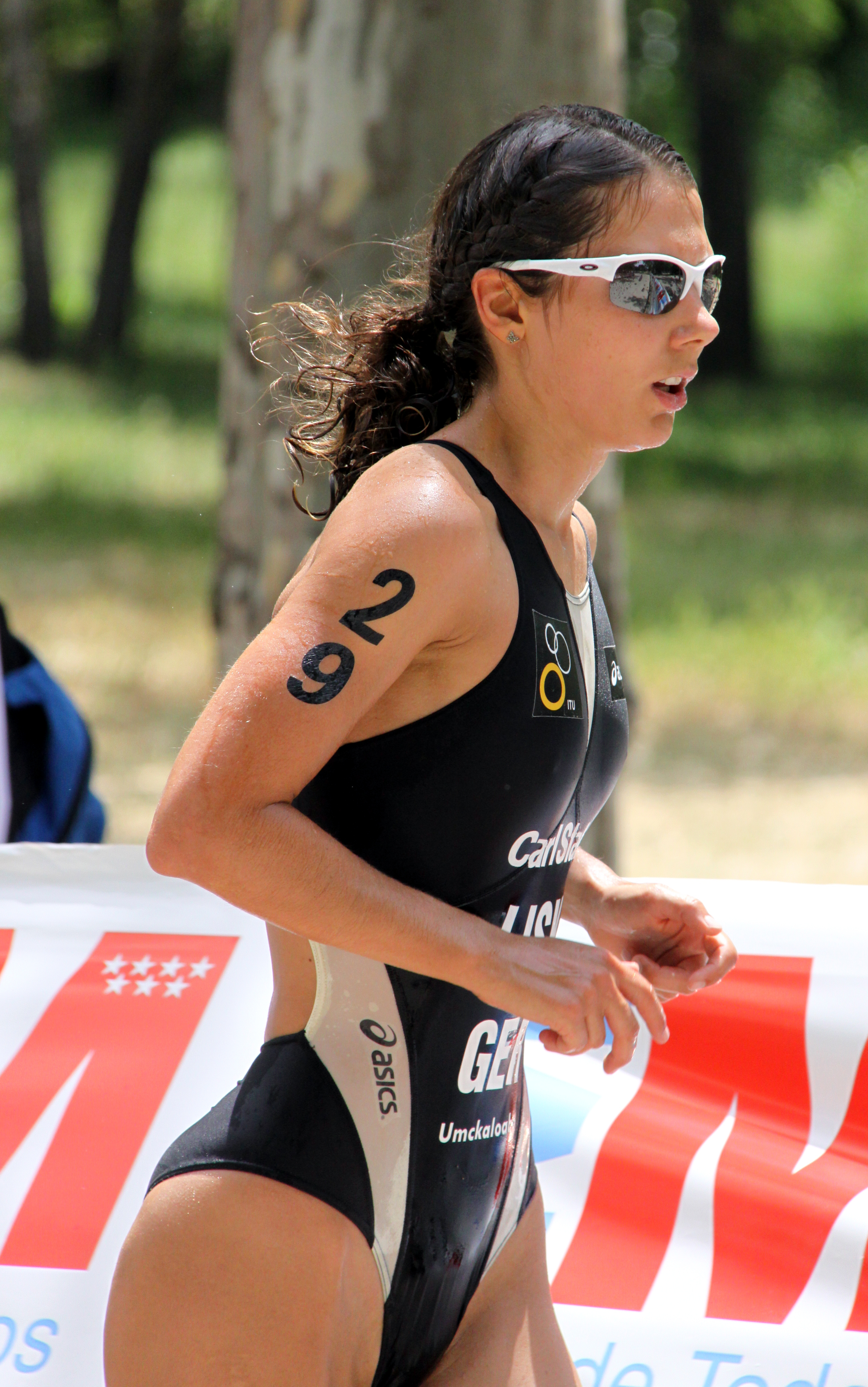
Ricarda Lisk placing 24th at the World Championship Series triathlon in Madrid, 2010.

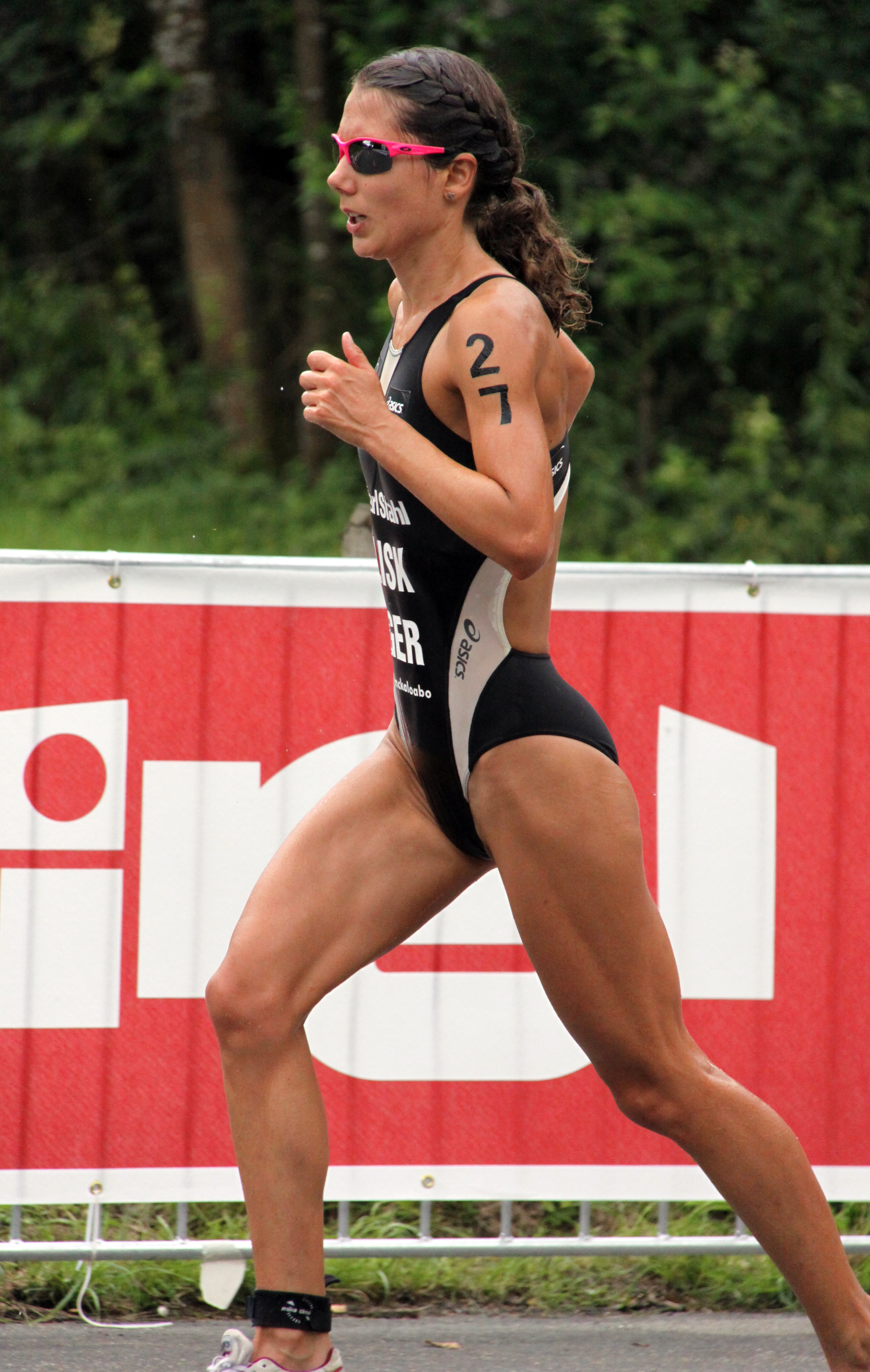
Ricarda Lisk at the World Championship Series triathlon in Kitzbuhel, 2010.

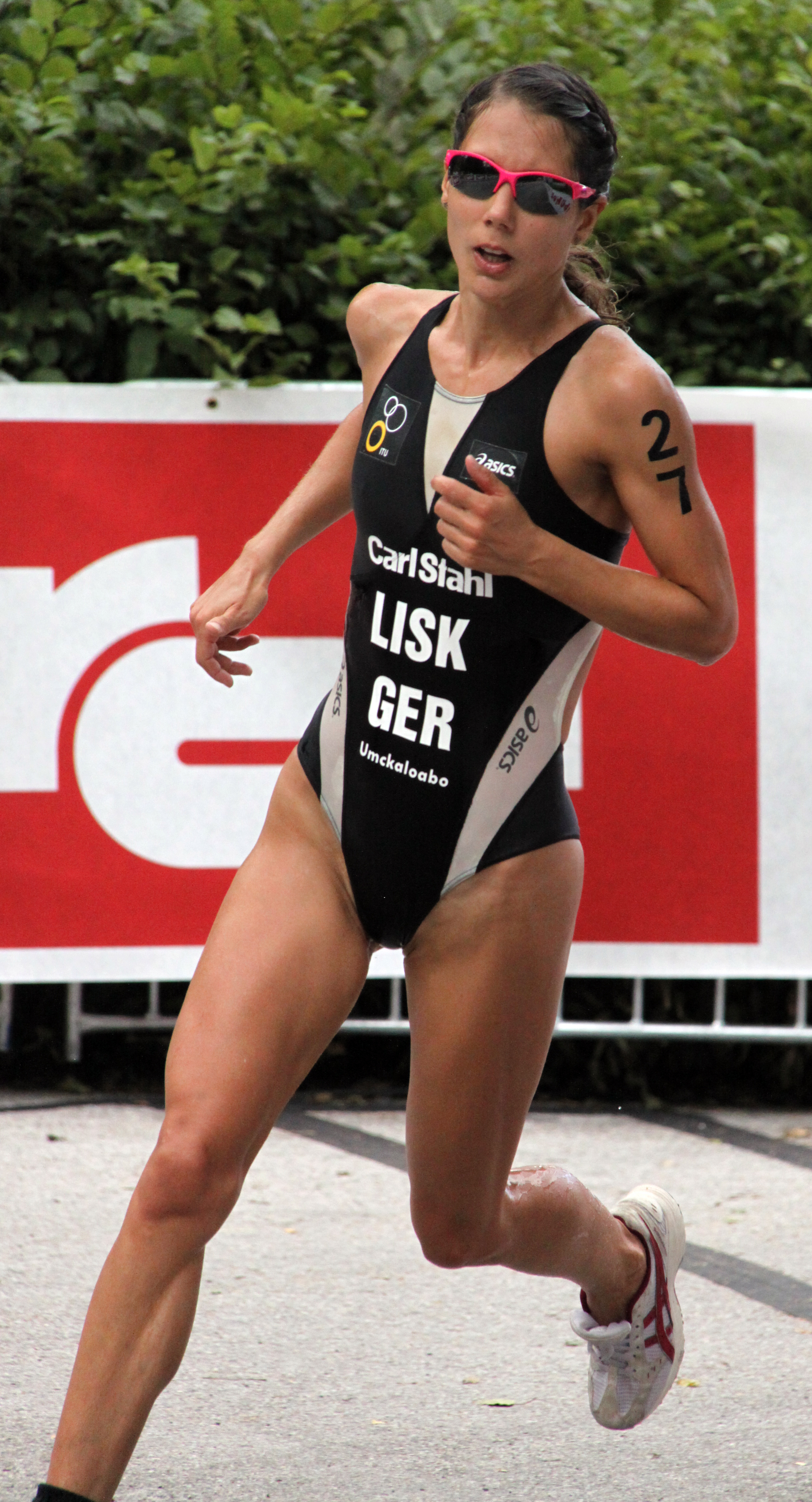
Ricarda Lisk at the World Championship Series triathlon in Kitzbuhel, 2010.

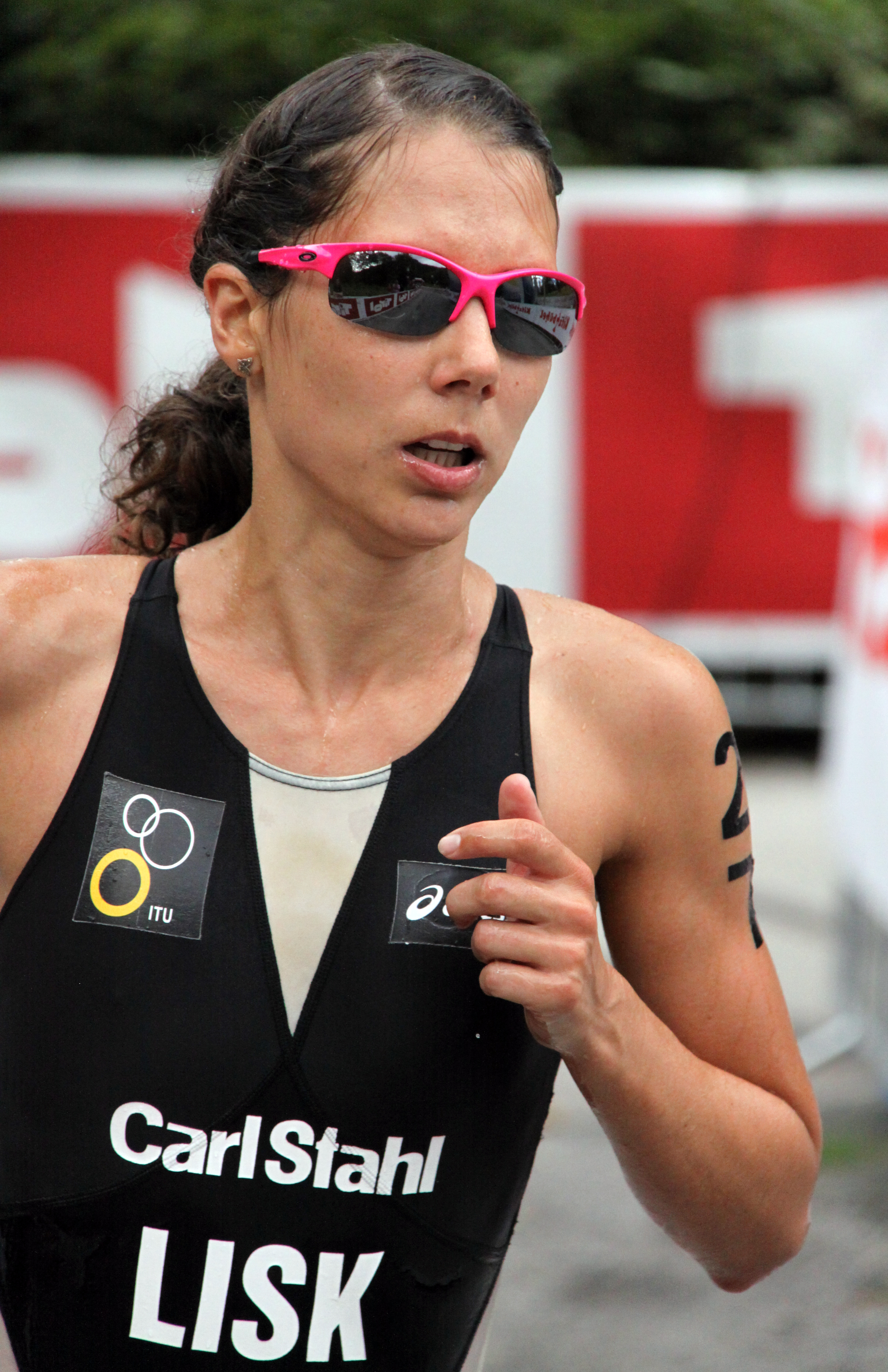
Ricarda Lisk at the World Championship Series triathlon in Kitzbuhel, 2010.
